= Iloilo =

- Province
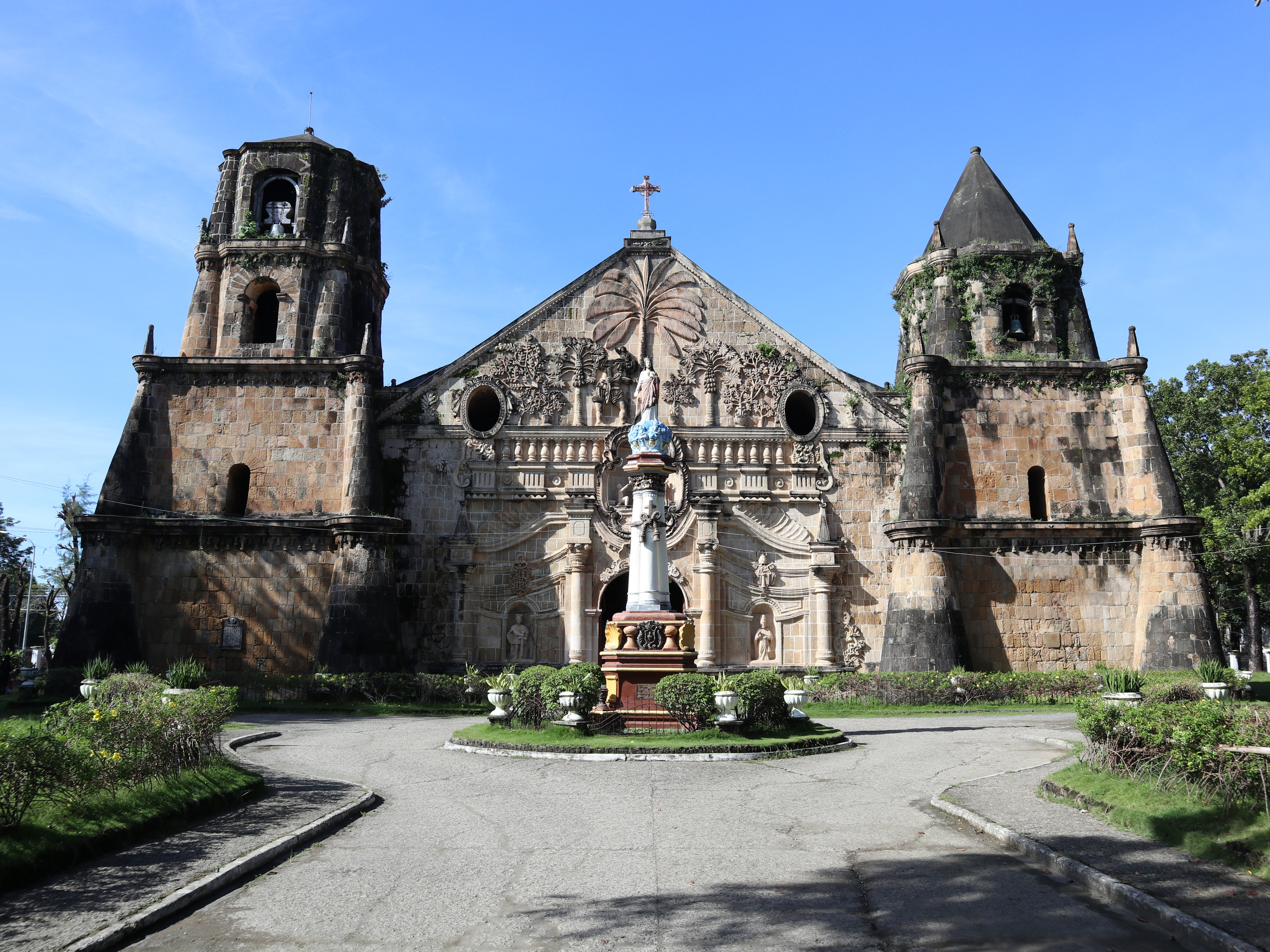
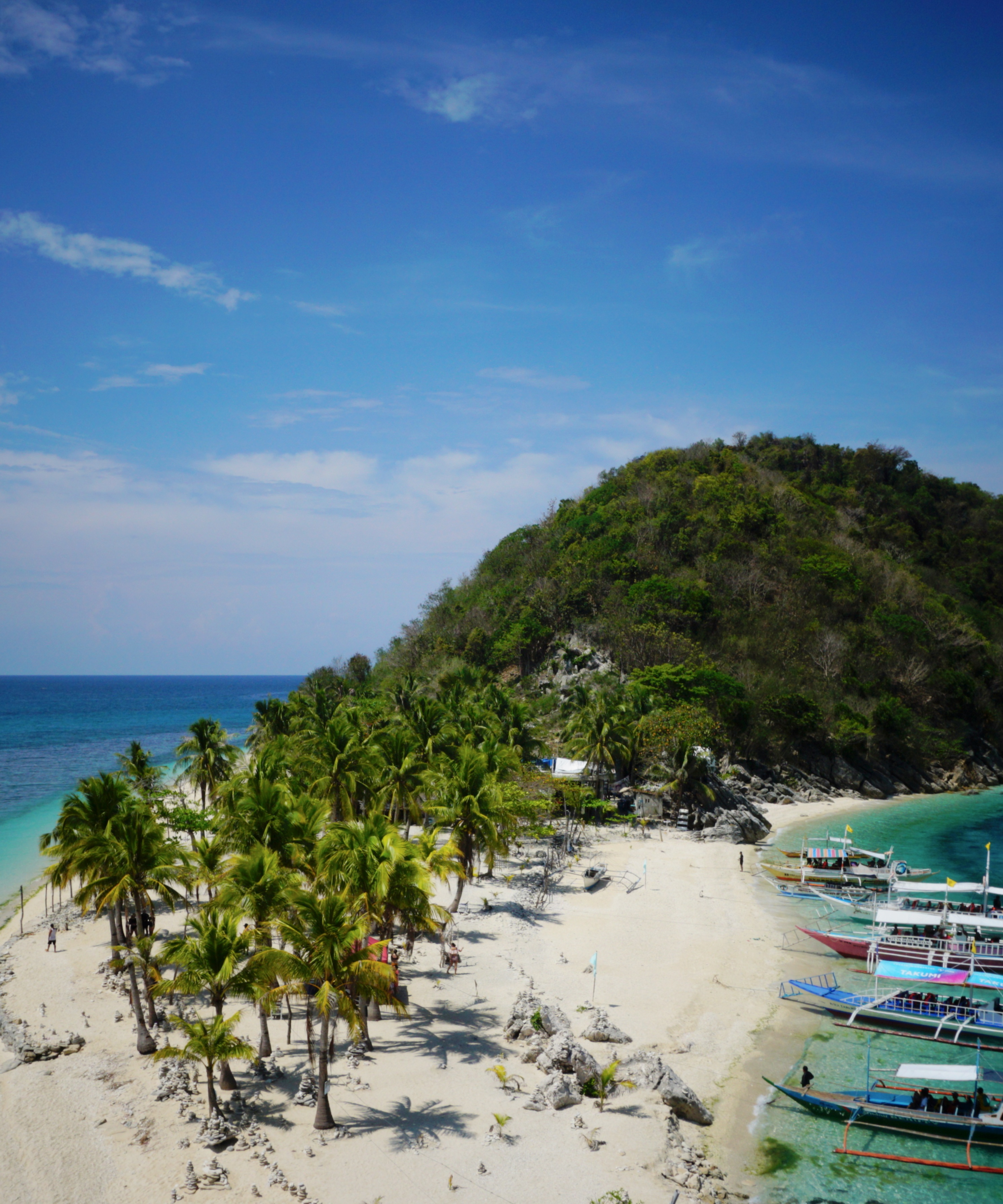
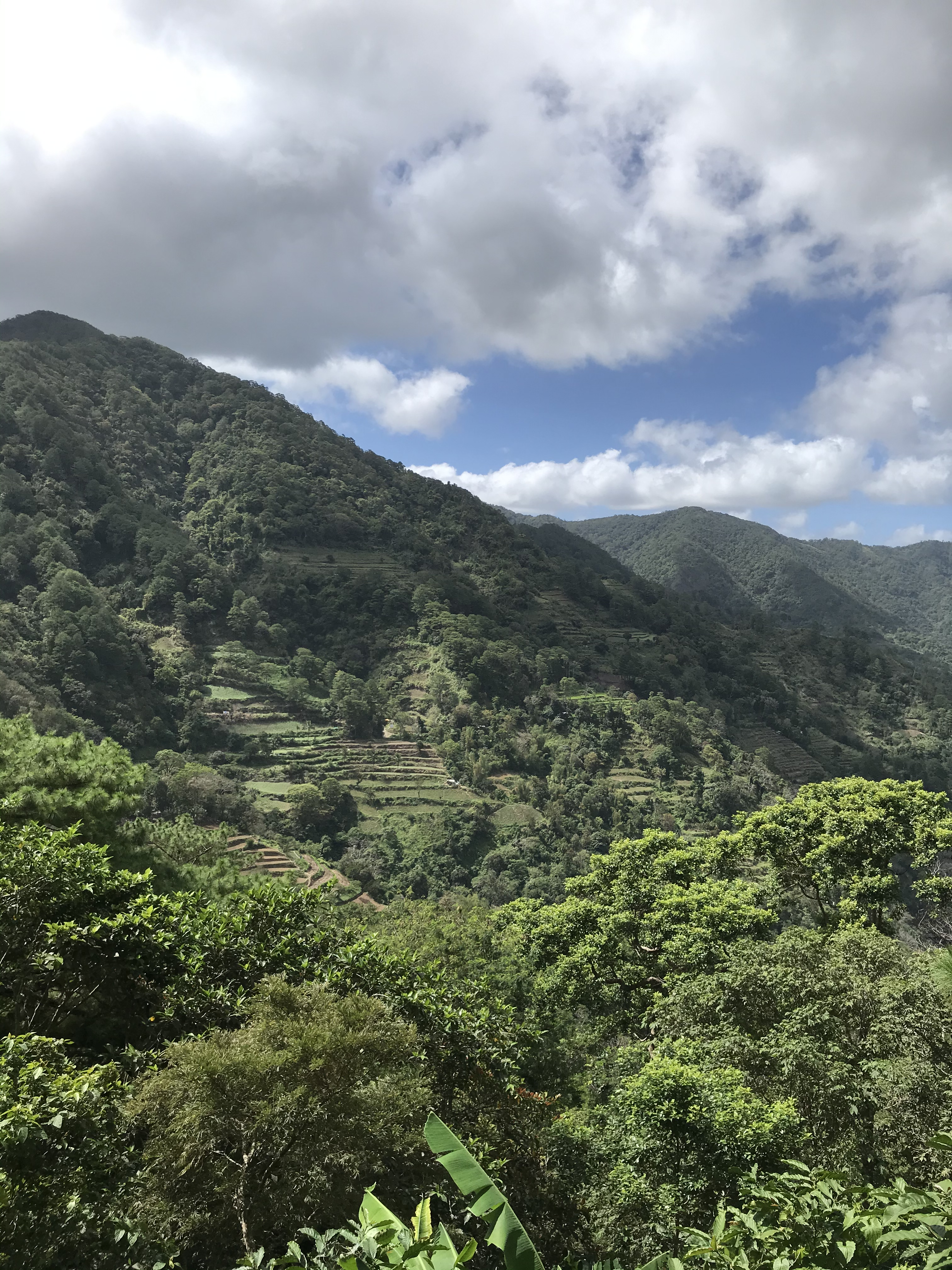
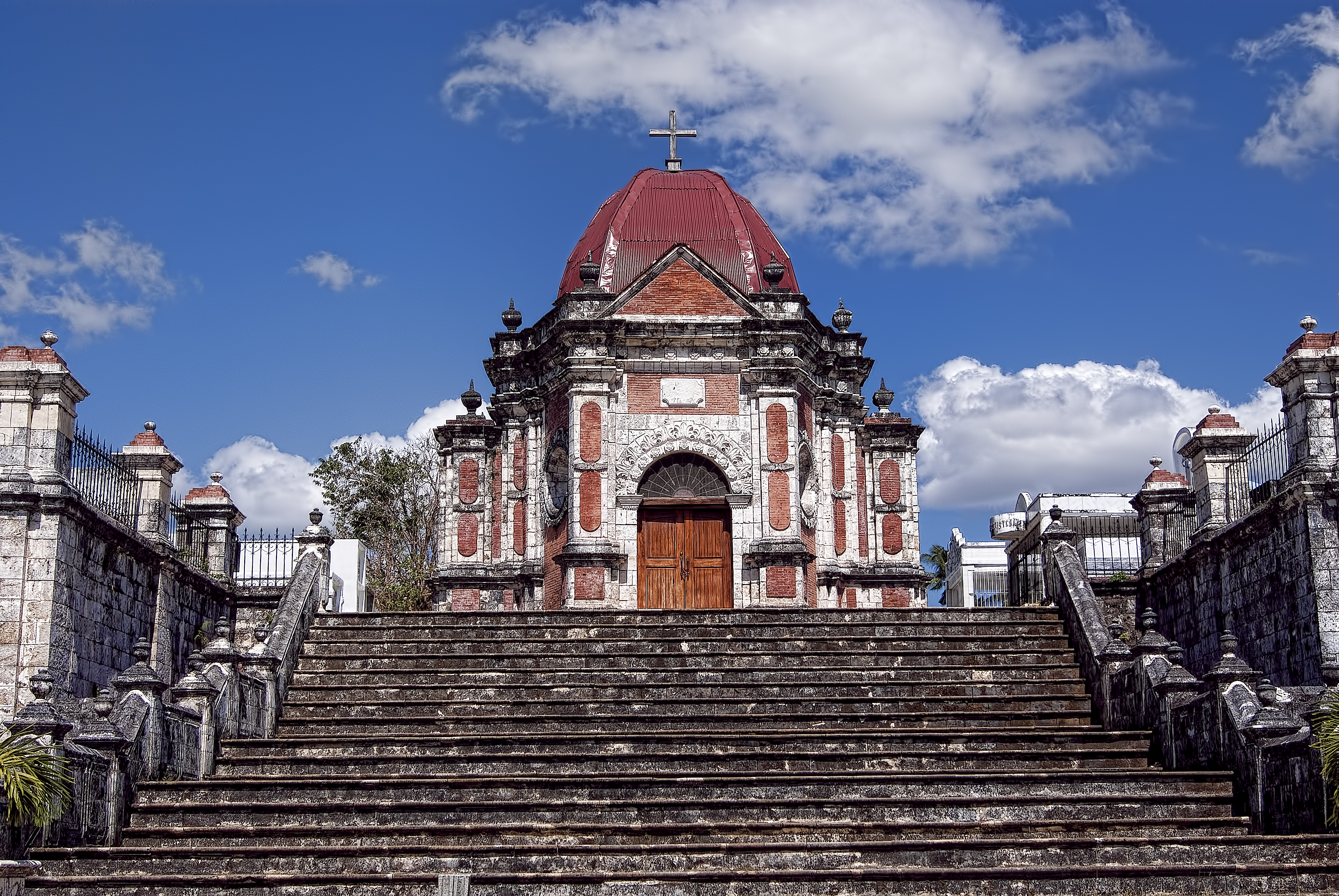
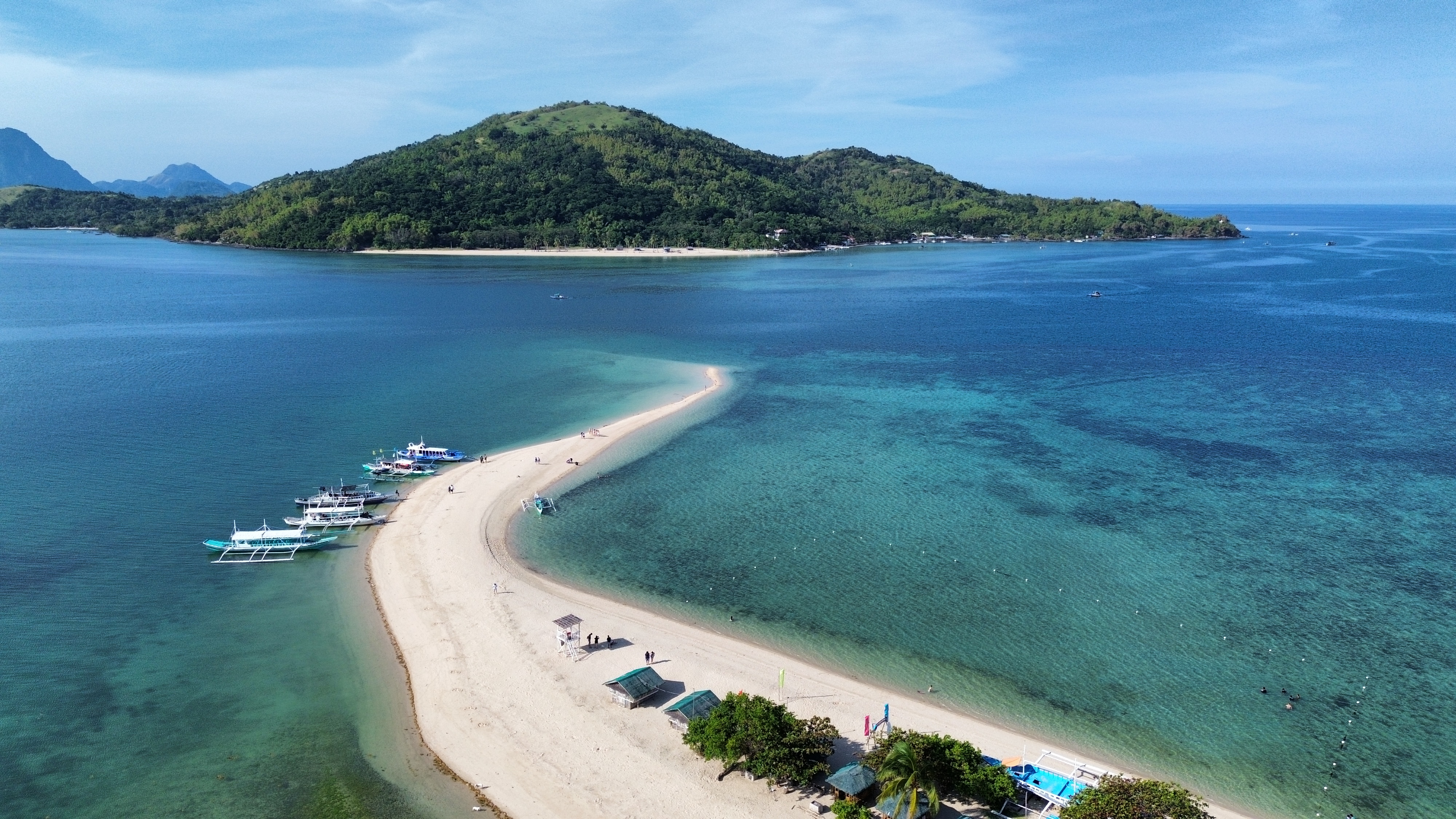
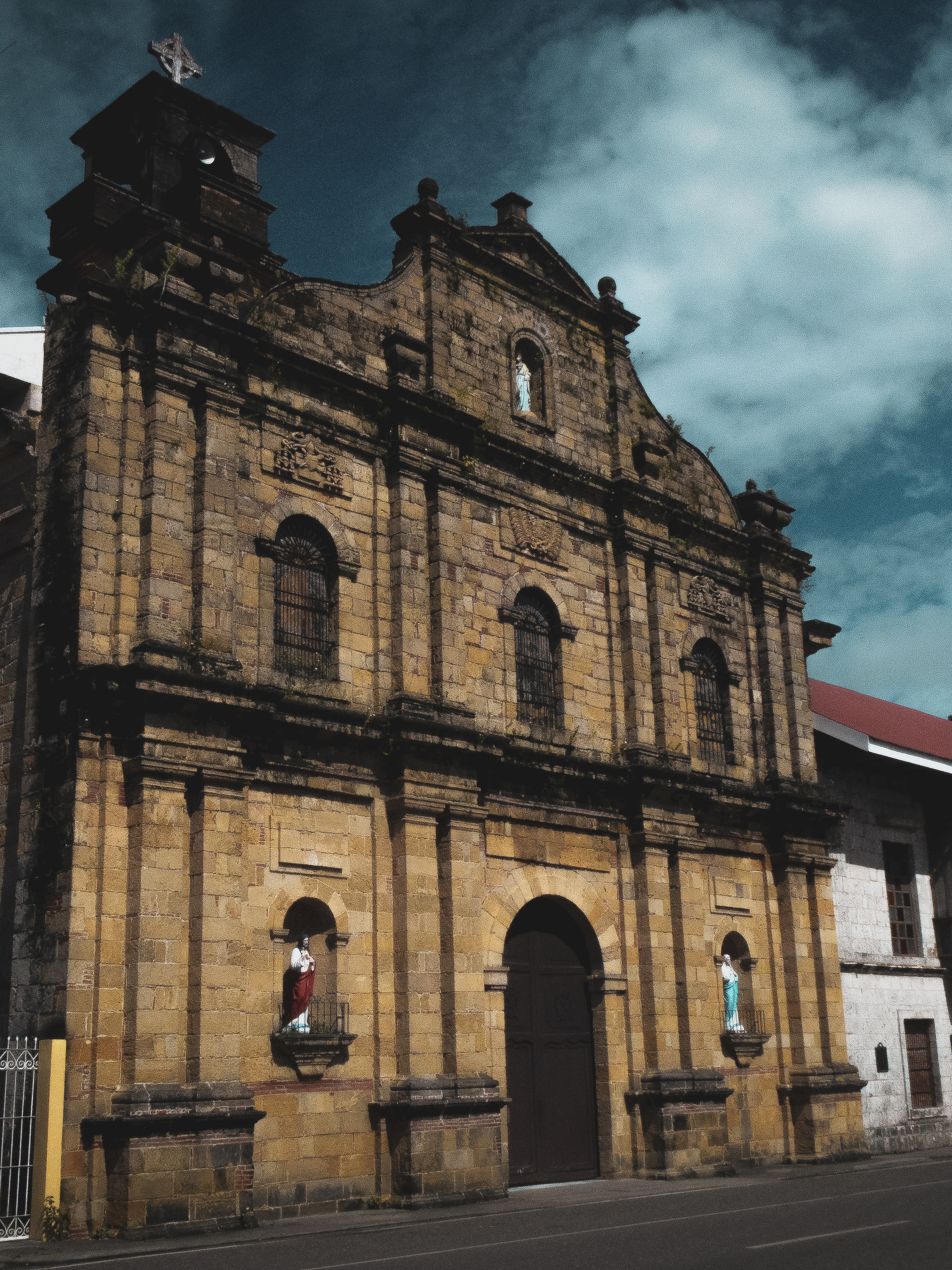
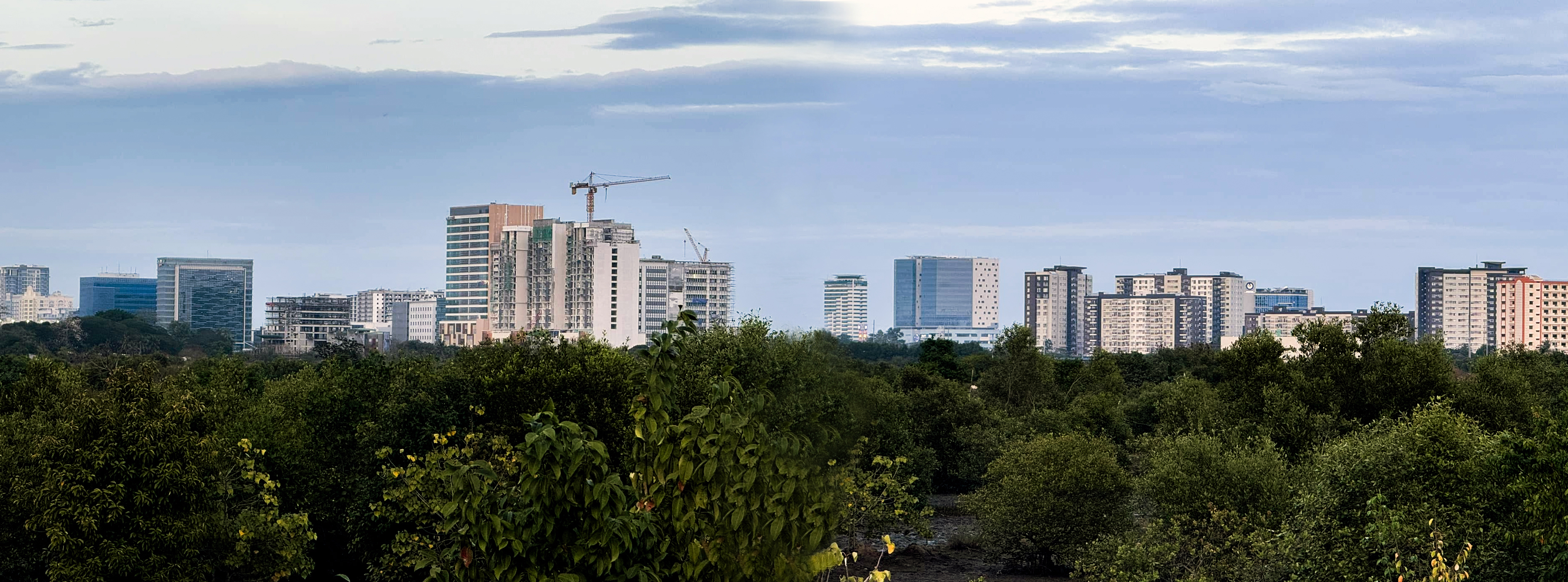
- Clockwise from top-left: Miag-ao Church, Islas de Gigantes, San Joaquin Campo Santo, Santa Barbara Church, Iloilo City, Concepcion Islands, and Bucari

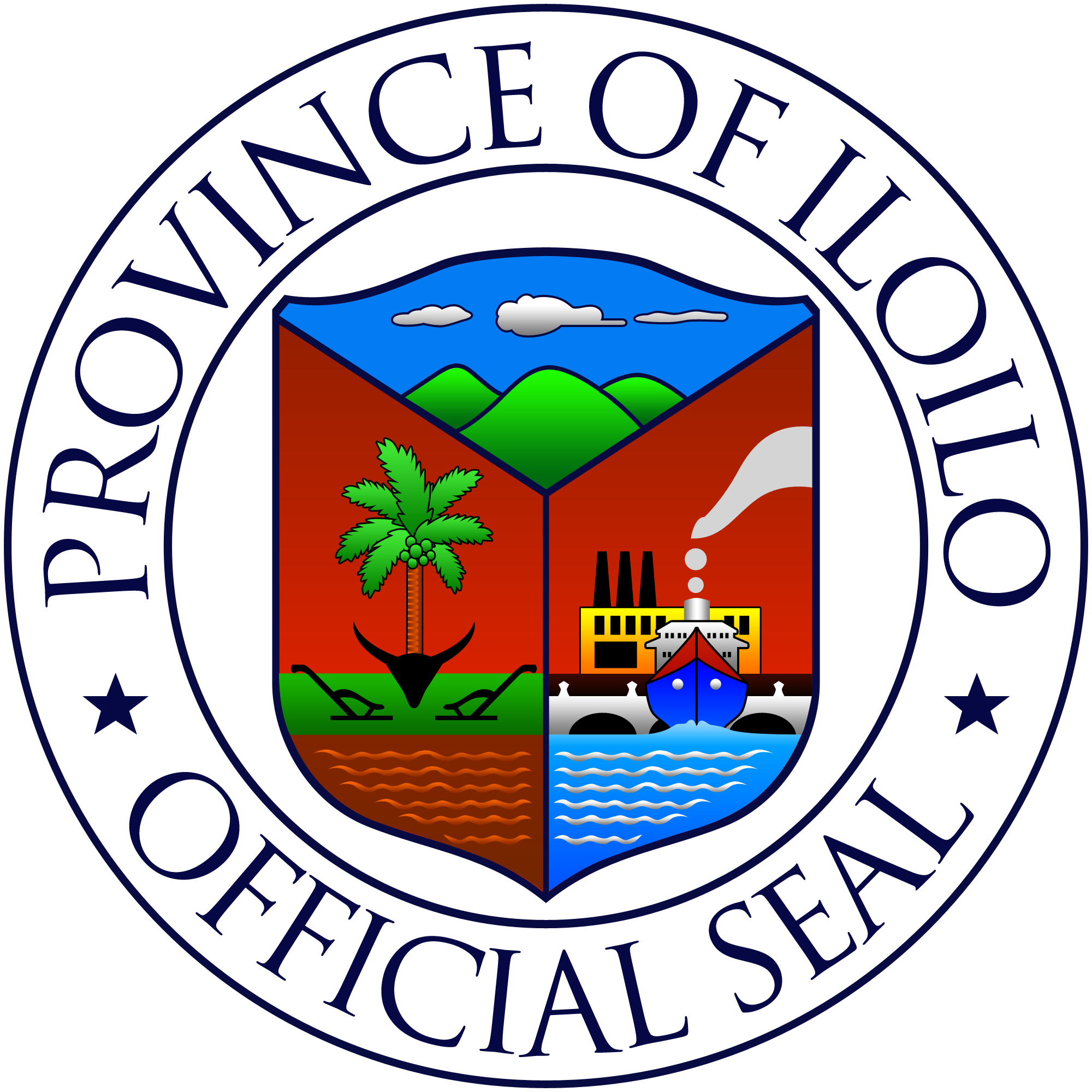
- Flag Seal
- Nickname: Heart of the Philippines
- Anthem: Himno sang Probinsya sang Iloilo (Iloilo Provincial Hymn)
- Interactive map of Iloilo
- Coordinates: 11°00′N 122°40′E
- Country: Philippines
- Region: Western Visayas
- Founded: 1569
- Capital and largest city: Iloilo City*

Government
  - Type: Sangguniang Panlalawigan
  - Governor: Arthur R. Defensor Jr. (Uswag)
  - Vice Governor: Nathalie Ann F. Debuque (PFP)
  - Legislature: Iloilo Provincial Board
  - Electorate: 1,649,730 voters (2025)

Area
  - Total: 5,000.83 km^{2} (1,930.83 sq mi)
  - Rank: 19th out of 82
- (excluding Iloilo City)
- Highest elevation (Mount Baloy): 1,958 m (6,424 ft)

Population (2024 census)
  - Total: 2,082,616
  - Rank: 12th out of 82
  - Density: 416.454/km^{2} (1,078.61/sq mi)
  - Rank: 14th out of 82
  - Households: 506,187
- (excluding Iloilo City)
- Demonym: Ilonggo

Divisions
  - Independent cities: 1: Iloilo City*
  - Component cities: 1: Passi
  - Municipalities: 42: Ajuy; Alimodian; Anilao; Badiangan; Balasan; Banate; Barotac Nuevo; Barotac Viejo; Batad; Bingawan; Cabatuan; Calinog; Carles; Concepcion; Dingle; Dueñas; Dumangas; Estancia; Guimbal; Igbaras; Janiuay; Lambunao; Leganes; Lemery; Leon; Maasin; Miagao; Mina; New Lucena; Oton; Pavia; Pototan; San Dionisio; San Enrique; San Joaquin; San Miguel; San Rafael; Santa Barbara; Sara; Tigbauan; Tubungan; Zarraga
  - Barangays: 1,721; including independent cities: 1,901
  - Districts: Legislative districts of Iloilo; Legislative district of Iloilo City

Economy
  - Income class: 1st provincial income class
  - Poverty incidence: 11.1% (2023)
  - Revenue: ₱ 5,571 million (2024)
  - Assets: ₱ 22,332 million (2024)
  - Expenditure: ₱ 1,770 million (2024)
  - Liabilities: ₱ 5,537 million (2024)
  - HDI: ▲0.800 (Very High)
  - HDI rank: 4th in Philippines (2019)
  - GDP: ₱351.05 billion $5.98 billion (2022)
- Time zone: UTC+8 (PST)
- PSGC: 063000000
- IDD : area code: +63 (0)33
- ISO 3166 code: PH-ILI
- Spoken languages: Hiligaynon; Kinaray-a; Capiznon; Ati; Filipino; English
- Website: iloilo.gov.ph
- * Iloilo City is a highly-urbanized city, politically independent from Iloilo Province.

Iloilo (/ˌɪloʊˈiːloʊ/ ih-loh-EE-loh; [ɪlo.ˈilo]), officially the Province of Iloilo (Hiligaynon: Kapuoran sang Iloilo; Kinaray-a: Kapuoran kang Iloilo; Tagalog: Lalawigan ng Iloilo; Spanish: Provincia de Iloílo), is a province in the Philippines located in the Western Visayas region. Its capital and largest city is Iloilo City, the regional center of Western Visayas and politically independent from the province. Iloilo occupies the southeast portion of the Visayan island of Panay and is bordered by the province of Antique to the west, Capiz to the north, the Jintotolo Channel to the northeast, the Guimaras Strait to the east, and the Iloilo Strait and Panay Gulf to the southwest. Iloilo City is the center of the Iloilo–Guimaras metropolitan area or Metro Iloilo–Guimaras, and is geographically located in the province and grouped under it by the Philippine Statistics Authority, but remains politically independent from the provincial government. According to the 2024 census, the population of the province (excluding Iloilo City) is 2,082,616. If Iloilo City is included, the population is 2,556,344 in total.

Iloilo is known for its rich history and cultural heritage. The southern part of the province is home to many Spanish-era historic sites, including the Miag-ao Church, a UNESCO World Heritage Site in the Philippines. It also boasts several other prominent structures, such as the San Joaquin Campo Santo, San Joaquin Church, and Santa Barbara Church, all recognized as National Cultural Treasures by the National Museum of the Philippines. In the northern part, it is known for beaches and islands, including the Bantigue Sandbar, Tangke Lagoon, Cabugao Island, and Antonia Island, all part of the Islas de Gigantes. Additionally, Sicogon Island, situated south of the group of islands, has gained popularity as a luxury tourist destination.

== Etymology ==
The name of the province is derived from Iloilo City, which in turn is derived from the older name "Irong-irong" (archaic Hiligaynon writing: Irong̃-írong̃) meaning "nose-like", referring to the promontory between two rivers (Iloilo and Batiano) where the Fort San Pedro and the 17th-century Spanish port were located.

== History ==
=== Early history ===
No pre-Hispanic written accounts of Iloilo and Panay island exist today. Oral tradition, in the form of recited epics like the Hinilawod, has survived to a small degree. A few recordings of these epic poems exist. The most notable are the works of noted Filipino Anthropologist Felipe Jocano.

While no current archaeological evidence exist describing pre-Hispanic Iloilo, an original work by Pedro Alcantara Monteclaro published in 1907 called Maragtas details the alleged accounts of the founding of the various pre-Hispanic polities on Panay Island. The book is based on oral and written accounts available to the author at the time. The author made no claim on the historical accuracy of the accounts.

According to Maragtas, Madja-as was founded after ten datus fled Borneo and landed on Panay Island. The book then goes on to detail their subsequent purchase of the coastal lands in which they settled from the native Ati people.

Datu Paiburong, one of the ten fleeing datus, established a settlement and named it Irong-Irong after an islet of the same name on the Batiano River. Afterwards, the warriors Labaodungon and Paybare, upon advice of datu Paiboring then recruited local fighters from the Philippines and fellow immigrants from Borneo and they returned to Borneo at Odtojan where the enemy of the ten datus, Makatunaw, ruled, Rajah or Sultan Makatunao, and they killed him and sacked the city he ruled and returned to the newly founded towns of the ten datus.

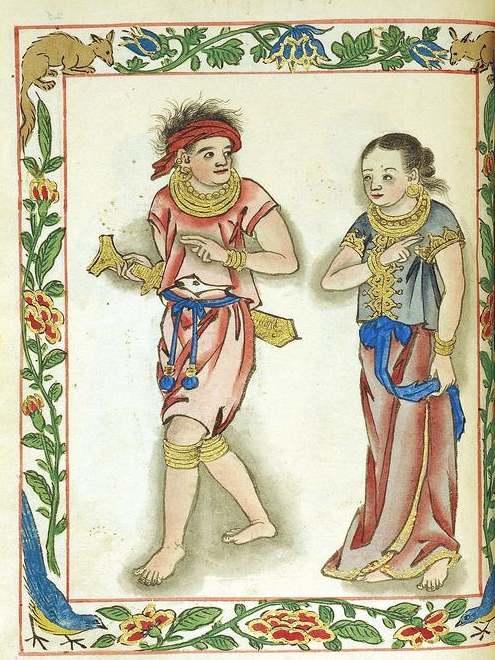
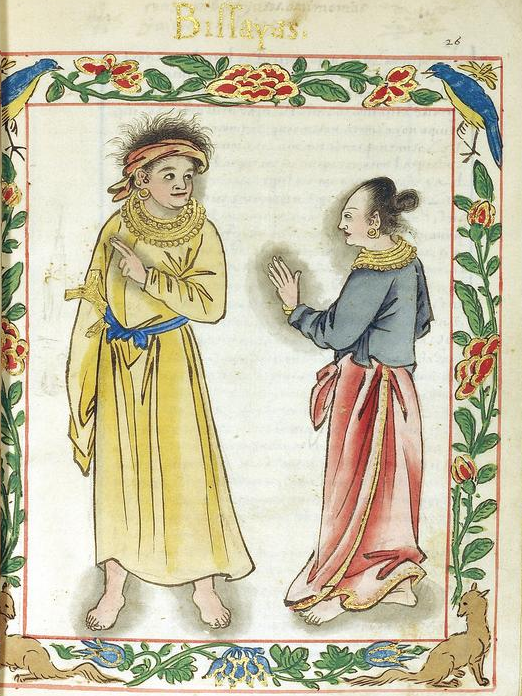
Left to right: Images from the Boxer Codex illustrating an ancient kadatuan or tumao of the Visayans of Panay wearing the distinctive colors of their social status: [1] a noble couple and [2] a royal couple. The wealth and prestige of these Visayans from Panay are clearly demonstrated vis-a-vis their loincloth-wearing Cebuano neighbors which the Spaniards called "Pintados" or "Tattooed Ones"

=== Spanish colonial era ===
Spain eventually succeeded on conquering of the island of Panay when Spanish conquistador Miguel López de Legazpi moved his headquarters from the island of Cebu and creating the first Spanish settlement in the island in Ogtong in 1566. This is mainly due in part to the rivalries between the Bisaya and the Moro, of which the former found an ally in Spanish against the latter. The Bisayas accepted alliances with Spain, to defend themselves against the enslaving Moros. To this end, Iloilo contributed troops in the Castille War against the Sultanate of Brunei.

Former provincial flag of Iloilo from 1886 to 1898 featured the white and blue ensign, which served as inspiration for elements adopted in the national Philippine flag

In 1581, the encomienda in Ogtong the second Spanish city in Panay island after Roxas City and founded by 80 colonists direct from Spain, the encomienda was soon moved to La Villa Rica de Arevalo, because of frequent coastal raids by the Dutch privateers. In 1586, it welcomed another 20 European Spanish Households and the garrison was reinforced by 30 Spanish and Mexican soldiers.

However, an attack in the year 1600 (Part of the Spanish–Moro conflict) where there was a large Muslim armada to destroy Iloilo City, led by two Moros named Sirungan and Salikala who lead the Muslim force of 70 ships and 4,000 warriors that had raided and attacked several Visayan islands in order to abduct slaves to sell to their allies in the Sultanate of Demak and the Sultanate of Malacca, eventually caused the move of the city center further on to the mouth of the Irong-Irong river founding what is now Iloilo City and constructing Fort San Pedro to defend it in 1616.

Nevertheless, when the 4,000 Moros led by Sirungan and Salikala tried to attack Iloilo City they were repulsed with heavy losses in the town of Arevalo by a force of 1,000 Hiligaynon warriors and 70 Mexican arquebusiers under the command of Juan García de Sierra, the Spanish officer who died in the battle. The Spanish Christianized the area. And starting 1603, as a reaction against Islamic raids, Iloilo province was reinforced by a consecutive number of 66, 50, 169, and then another 169 Mexican soldiers from Latin America during the years 1603, 1636, 1670, and 1672.

Soon, the area itself began to prosper, due to its successful textile and sugar industry. As a result, it received Chinese immigrants from the west (that worked for its trades) and Latinos from the ports of Mexico in the east (to man its military installations). The Jesuits soon built a school for Spanish and Visayan boys in Tigbauan, Iloilo. Later in the 1700s, Iloilo was home to 166 Spanish Filipino families and 29,723 native families. Specifically, the capital at downtown Iloilo had 103 Spanish-Filipino families while the nearby Chinatown of Molo had 23 Spanish-Filipino families. Asides from these Spanish-Filipino families, there were also 470 Spanish-Filipino mestizo families; as well as 11 Chinese-Filipino families and 665 Chinese-Filipino Mestizo families that were scattered all across the province of Iloilo.

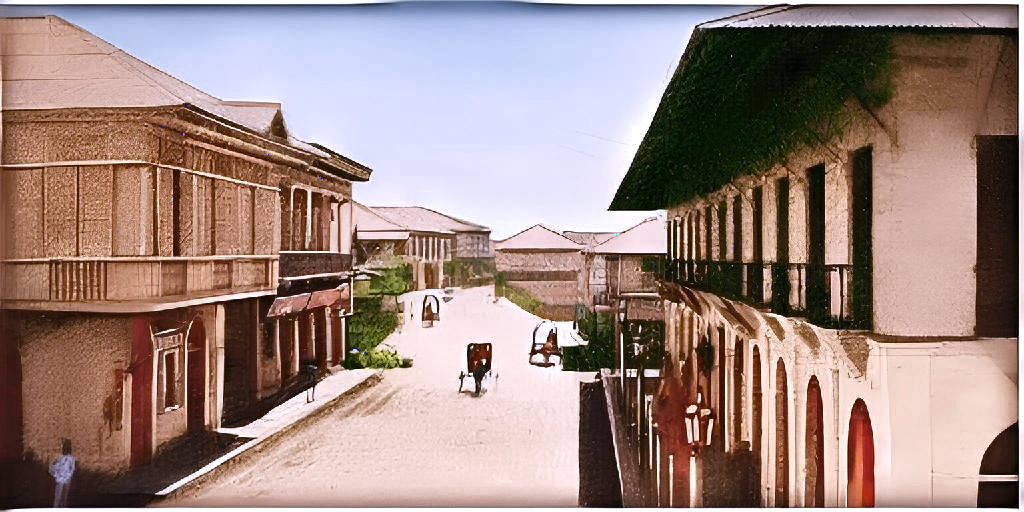
Bahay na bato houses along Calle Real

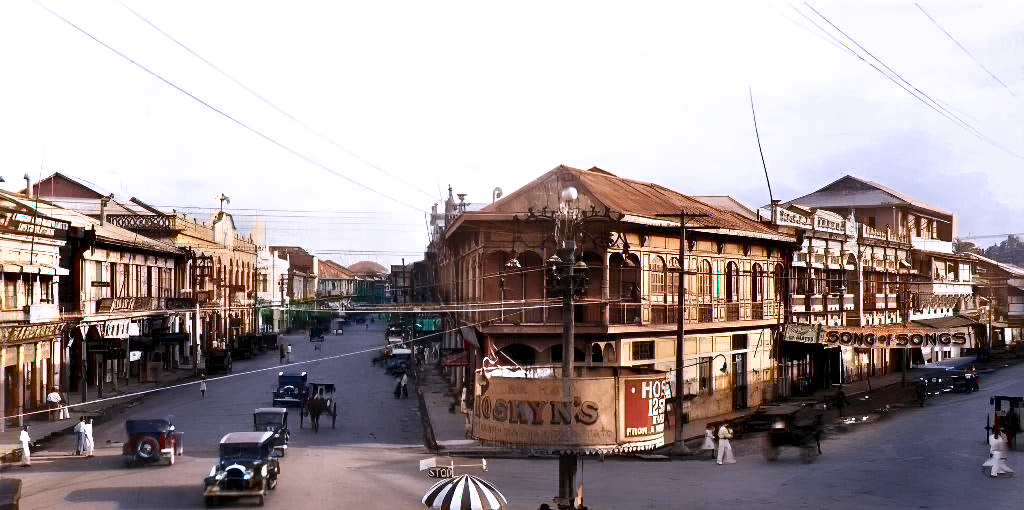
Iloilo City in the 1900s

=== American colonial era ===
During the American colonial period, Iloilo became a home to many firsts: including the first department stores and cinema theaters in the Commonwealth of the Philippines.

=== Japanese occupation ===
Iloilo experienced severe devastation during the events of World War II. The Japanese built "comfort stations" in Iloilo in 1942, where they imprisoned Filipino "comfort women" who they routinely gang-raped, brutalized, and murdered for entertainment. Nevertheless, during the Japanese occupation, Macario Peralta Jr., freed most of Panay (with little exceptions) from Japanese Imperialism, thus other allied guerillas in other provinces from Romblon, Palawan, Marinduque and portions of Masbate and Mindoro, considered majority liberated Panay Island, the "Primus inter pares" in their alliance network.

=== Philippine independence ===
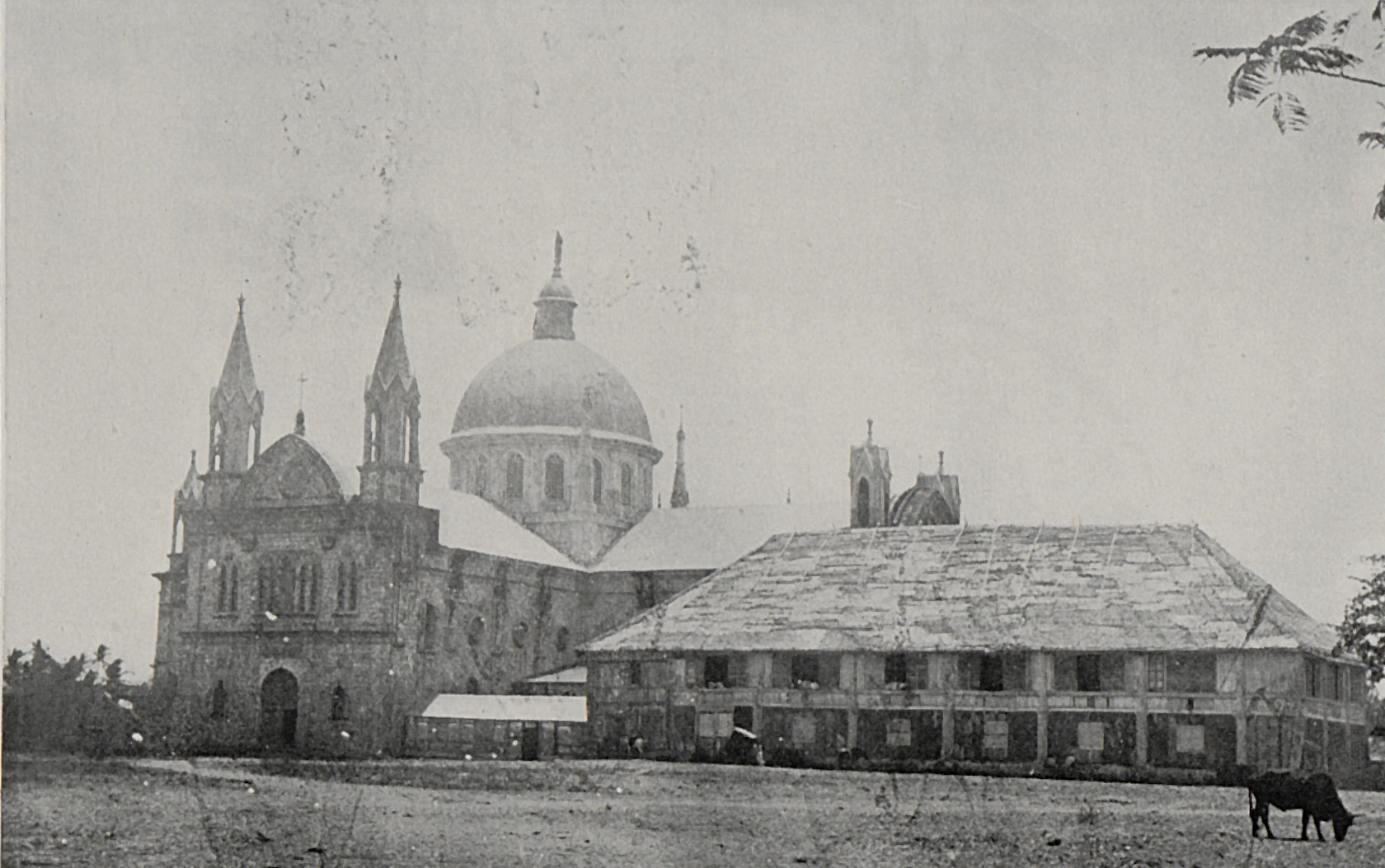
Old Oton Church in Oton, the largest of all churches in the Visayas: consecrated 1891, destroyed by earthquake January 24, 1948. There have been generations of calls in Western Visayas for the full restoration of their mother church.

Iloilo became a province of the newly fledged Republic of the Philippines when the archipelago gained independence from the United States on July 4, 1946. The province used to be the home of the gigantic-megalithic Old Oton Church, the grandest of all churches in the Visayas. The church was damaged by an earthquake in 1948. Instead of being restored, it was later demolished and replaced with an inferior structure. This has led to generations of public calls for the full authentic restoration of the old church.

=== Martial law era ===
The beginning months of the 1970s had marked a period of turmoil and change in the Philippines, as well as in Iloilo. During his bid to be the first Philippine president to be re-elected for a second term, Ferdinand Marcos launched an unprecedented number of foreign debt-funded public works projects. This caused the Philippine economy to take a sudden downwards turn known as the 1969 Philippine balance of payments crisis, which led to a period of economic difficulty and a significant rise of social unrest. With only a year left in his last constitutionally allowed term as president, Ferdinand Marcos placed the Philippines under Martial Law in September 1972 and thus retained the position for fourteen more years. This period in Philippine history is remembered for the Marcos administration's record of human rights abuses, particularly targeting political opponents, student activists, journalists, religious workers, farmers, and others who fought against the Marcos dictatorship. In Iloilo, a major holding area for the many Political detainees under the Marcos dictatorship was Camp Martin Delgado in the Fort San Pedro area of Iloilo City where Luing Posa-Dominado was detained alongside Judy Taguiwalo and tortured, manhandled, and sexually assaulted Local World War II heroine Coronacion "Walingwaling" Chiva was also detained there for opposing Marcos, although her status as a legendary World War II heroine meant she was mostly not harmed during detention. Labor lawyer Rodolfo Lagoc was also detained there for six months. In yet another military camp, this time in Santa Barbara, Iloilo, 2Lt Pablo G. Fernandez, who objected to martial law, was detained and summarily executed.

== Geography ==
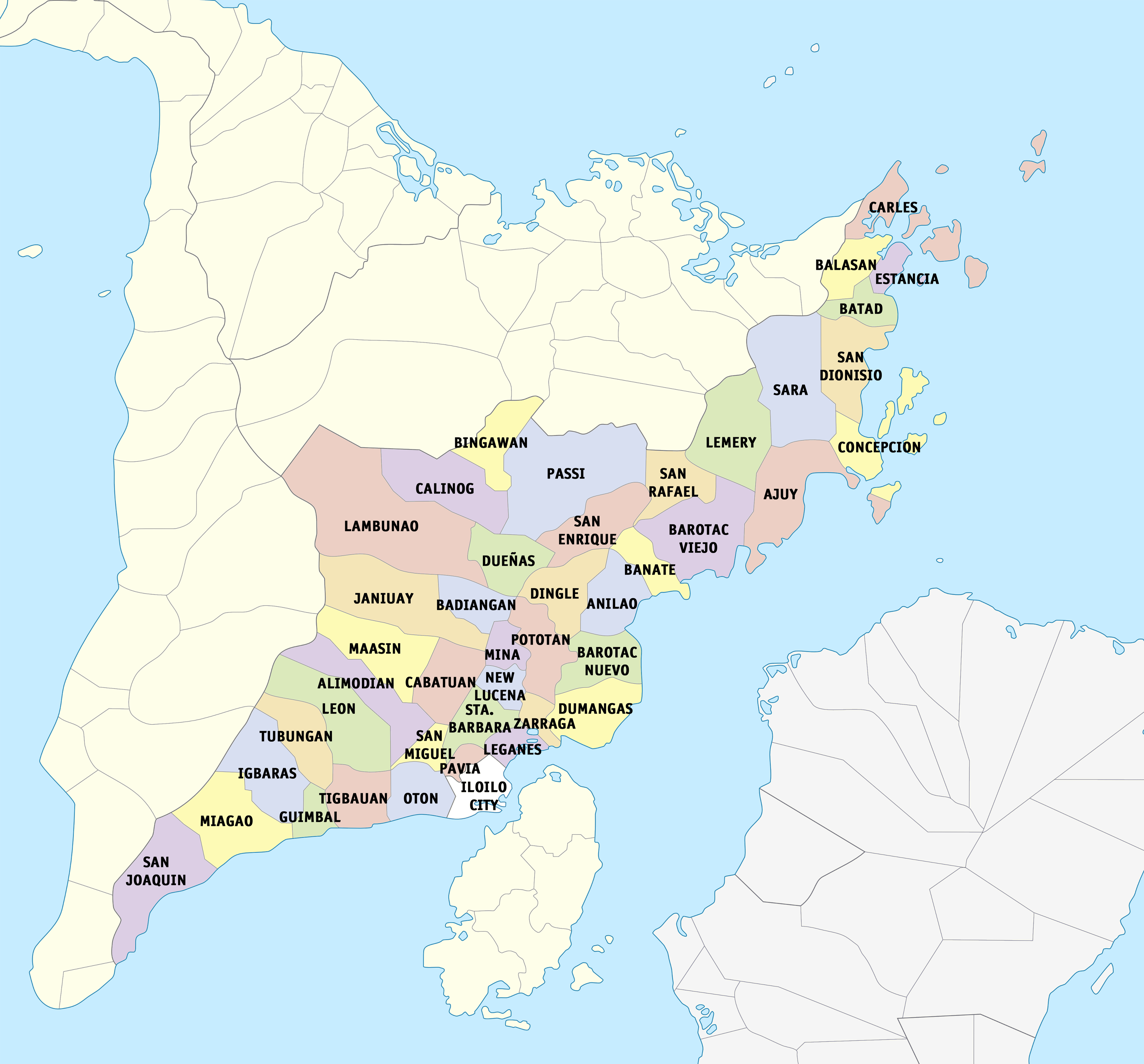
Map of Iloilo

The province covers a total area of 5,000.83 square kilometres (1,930.83 sq mi) occupying the central and eastern section of Panay island in the Western Visayas region. If Iloilo City is included for geographical purposes, Iloilo has an area of 5,079.17 square kilometres (1,961.08 sq mi). The province is bordered by the province of Antique to the west, Capiz to the north, the Jintotolo Channel to the northeast, the Visayan Sea and Guimaras Strait to the east, and the Iloilo Strait and Panay Gulf to the southwest.

The province is divided into two distinct geographic regions; the highlands of the Central Panay Mountain Range on the western border and the lowland plains which account for a larger portion of the province. Small islands east of its northernmost tip also dot the Visayan Sea - of these, Pan de Azucar and Sicogon are well-known. Mount Baloy is the highest mountain in Iloilo with an elevation of 6,424 feet (1,958 m) above sea level, located on the triple border of Iloilo, Capiz, and Antique. Other peaks are Mount Llorente 4,409 ft. (1,344m), Mount Sansanan 4,219 ft. (1,286m), Mount Napulak 4,095 ft. (1,248 m), Mount Balabag 3,728 ft. (1,136m). Expansive fishponds and mangrove wetlands are found along the coasts and rivers of Iloilo City and the towns of Oton, Leganes, Zarraga, Dumangas, Anilao, Banate, Barotac Viejo, Barotac Nuevo, Ajuy, Balasan and Carles.

=== Topography ===
List of peaks in Iloilo by elevation:

- Mount Baloy
- Mount Inaman
- Mount Igdalig
- Mount Tiran

=== Rivers ===
List of rivers in Iloilo by length:

- Jalaur River
- Tigum River
- Lamunan River
- Ulian River (Laglag)
- Suage River
- Aganan River
- Sibalom River, Tigbauan
- Jar-ao River, Guimbal
- Asisig River
- Alawihaw River
- Tangyan River
- Balantian River
- Barotac Viejo River
- Sara River
- Siuaragan River
- Barotac Nuevo River
- Lawigan River
- Cata-an River
- Banate River
- Tiolas River
- Tumagbok River
- Oyungan River
- Iloilo River

=== Administrative divisions ===
The Province of Iloilo consists of 42 municipalities and two cities (one component and one highly urbanized).

- † Provincial capital and highly urbanized city
- ∗ Component city
- Municipality

City or municipality		District	Population			±% p.a.	Area		Density		Barangay	Coordinates^{[A]}
			(2020)		(2015)		km^{2}	sq mi	/km^{2}	/sq mi		
Ajuy		5th	2.6%	53,462	52,268	+0.43%	175.57	67.79	300	780	34	11°10′17″N 123°01′12″E
Alimodian		2nd	1.9%	39,722	38,408	+0.64%	144.82	55.92	270	700	51	10°48′59″N 122°25′56″E
Anilao		4th	1.5%	30,520	28,684	+1.19%	85.09	32.85	360	930	21	10°58′44″N 122°45′04″E
Badiangan		3rd	1.3%	27,056	27,005	+0.04%	77.50	29.92	350	910	31	10°59′11″N 122°32′12″E
Balasan		5th	1.7%	35,064	33,088	+1.11%	54.27	20.95	650	1,700	23	11°28′23″N 123°05′21″E
Banate		4th	1.6%	33,376	32,532	+0.49%	73.48	28.37	450	1,200	18	11°00′02″N 122°49′06″E
Barotac Nuevo		4th	2.8%	58,176	54,146	+1.38%	94.49	36.48	620	1,600	29	10°53′42″N 122°42′15″E
Barotac Viejo		5th	2.4%	48,614	45,808	+1.14%	185.78	71.73	260	670	26	11°02′31″N 122°51′02″E
Batad		5th	1.1%	22,157	21,298	+0.76%	53.10	20.50	420	1,100	24	11°25′02″N 123°06′35″E
Bingawan		3rd	0.8%	16,164	15,199	+1.18%	85.20	32.90	190	490	14	11°13′58″N 122°34′03″E
Cabatuan		3rd	3.0%	61,110	58,442	+0.85%	112.90	43.59	540	1,400	68	10°52′49″N 122°28′53″E
Calinog		3rd	3.1%	62,853	60,413	+0.76%	274.55	106.00	230	600	59	11°07′21″N 122°32′17″E
Carles		5th	3.5%	72,637	68,160	+1.22%	104.05	40.17	700	1,800	33	11°34′17″N 123°07′57″E
Concepcion		5th	2.2%	44,633	43,159	+0.64%	86.12	33.25	520	1,300	25	11°12′53″N 123°06′30″E
Dingle		4th	2.2%	45,965	45,335	+0.26%	98.37	37.98	470	1,200	33	11°00′00″N 122°40′18″E
Dueñas		4th	1.7%	34,597	34,242	+0.20%	90.52	34.95	380	980	47	11°03′58″N 122°37′06″E
Dumangas		4th	3.6%	73,899	69,108	+1.28%	128.70	49.69	570	1,500	45	10°49′17″N 122°42′44″E
Estancia		5th	2.6%	53,200	48,546	+1.76%	29.38	11.34	1,800	4,700	25	11°27′29″N 123°09′04″E
Guimbal		1st	1.7%	35,022	33,820	+0.67%	44.63	17.23	780	2,000	33	10°39′41″N 122°19′22″E
Igbaras		1st	1.6%	32,197	32,004	+0.11%	148.72	57.42	220	570	46	10°43′02″N 122°15′55″E
Iloilo City	†	lone	—	457,626	447,992	+0.41%	78.34	30.25	5,800	15,000	180	10°42′09″N 122°34′08″E
Janiuay		3rd	3.3%	66,786	63,905	+0.84%	179.10	69.15	370	960	60	10°56′57″N 122°30′07″E
Lambunao		3rd	4.0%	81,236	73,640	+1.89%	407.09	157.18	200	520	73	11°03′19″N 122°28′29″E
Leganes		2nd	1.7%	34,725	32,480	+1.28%	32.20	12.43	1,100	2,800	18	10°47′11″N 122°35′21″E
Lemery		5th	1.5%	31,414	30,851	+0.34%	137.55	53.11	230	600	31	11°13′33″N 122°55′39″E
Leon		2nd	2.5%	51,990	49,875	+0.79%	163.97	63.31	320	830	85	10°46′50″N 122°23′18″E
Maasin		3rd	1.9%	38,461	36,922	+0.78%	128.59	49.65	300	780	50	10°53′27″N 122°26′00″E
Miagao		1st	3.3%	68,115	67,565	+0.15%	156.80	60.54	430	1,100	119	10°38′28″N 122°14′08″E
Mina		3rd	1.2%	24,042	23,546	+0.40%	43.40	16.76	550	1,400	22	10°55′48″N 122°34′27″E
New Lucena		2nd	1.2%	24,314	23,240	+0.86%	44.10	17.03	550	1,400	21	10°52′39″N 122°35′48″E
Oton		1st	4.8%	98,509	89,115	+1.93%	86.44	33.37	1,100	2,800	37	10°41′37″N 122°28′38″E
Passi City	∗	4th	4.3%	88,873	80,544	+1.89%	251.39	97.06	350	910	51	11°07′03″N 122°38′36″E
Pavia		2nd	3.4%	70,388	55,603	+4.59%	27.15	10.48	2,600	6,700	18	10°46′29″N 122°32′31″E
Pototan		3rd	3.8%	78,298	75,070	+0.80%	97.10	37.49	810	2,100	50	10°56′32″N 122°38′09″E
San Dionisio		5th	1.9%	39,048	38,775	+0.13%	127.06	49.06	310	800	29	11°16′12″N 123°05′39″E
San Enrique		4th	1.8%	36,911	33,911	+1.63%	110.28	42.58	330	850	28	11°04′21″N 122°39′21″E
San Joaquin		1st	2.6%	52,617	51,892	+0.26%	234.84	90.67	220	570	85	10°35′11″N 122°08′32″E
San Miguel		2nd	1.5%	30,115	27,686	+1.61%	31.97	12.34	940	2,400	24	10°46′51″N 122°27′54″E
San Rafael		5th	0.9%	17,795	16,532	+1.41%	67.05	25.89	270	700	9	11°10′48″N 122°49′44″E
Santa Barbara		2nd	3.3%	67,630	60,215	+2.24%	131.96	50.95	510	1,300	60	10°49′38″N 122°31′53″E
Sara		5th	2.7%	54,637	52,631	+0.71%	169.02	65.26	320	830	42	11°15′31″N 123°00′46″E
Tigbauan		1st	3.2%	65,245	62,706	+0.76%	83.68	32.31	780	2,000	52	10°40′28″N 122°22′34″E
Tubungan		1st	1.1%	23,021	22,449	+0.48%	85.18	32.89	270	700	48	10°45′55″N 122°19′05″E
Zarraga		2nd	1.3%	27,305	25,605	+1.23%	54.48	21.03	500	1,300	24	10°49′25″N 122°36′36″E
Total^{[B]}				2,051,899	1,936,423	+1.11%	4,997.64	1,929.60	410	1,100	1,721	(see GeoGroup box)
1. Coordinates mark the city/town center, and are sortable by latitude.; 2. Total figures exclude the highly urbanized city of Iloilo.

=== Climate ===
Climate data for Iloilo, Philippines — NOAA Station Id: PH98637
Month	Jan	Feb	Mar	Apr	May	Jun	Jul	Aug	Sep	Oct	Nov	Dec	Year
Mean daily maximum °C (°F)	29.7 (85.5)	30.2 (86.4)	31.7 (89.1)	33.1 (91.6)	33.1 (91.6)	31.6 (88.9)	30.7 (87.3)	30.4 (86.7)	30.8 (87.4)	31.1 (88.0)	30.9 (87.6)	30.2 (86.4)	31.12 (88.02)
Daily mean °C (°F)	26.1 (79.0)	26.5 (79.7)	27.6 (81.7)	28.9 (84.0)	29.1 (84.4)	28.1 (82.6)	27.6 (81.7)	27.5 (81.5)	27.6 (81.7)	27.7 (81.9)	27.5 (81.5)	26.8 (80.2)	27.59 (81.66)
Mean daily minimum °C (°F)	22.7 (72.9)	22.7 (72.9)	23.5 (74.3)	24.6 (76.3)	25.1 (77.2)	24.7 (76.5)	24.4 (75.9)	24.5 (76.1)	24.4 (75.9)	24.2 (75.6)	24.0 (75.2)	23.4 (74.1)	24.02 (75.24)
Average rainfall mm (inches)	39.9 (1.57)	19.1 (0.75)	27.1 (1.07)	47.7 (1.88)	117.9 (4.64)	255.2 (10.05)	313.2 (12.33)	363.7 (14.32)	266.8 (10.50)	264.1 (10.40)	174.8 (6.88)	64.2 (2.53)	1,953.7 (76.92)
Average relative humidity (%)	82	80	75	73	77	82	85	85	85	84	84	83	81.25
Source: "Climate (Average Weather) Data". Climate-Charts.com. Archived from the original on May 11, 2011.

== Demographics ==
Population census of Iloilo

Year	Pop.	±% p.a.
1903	329,993	—
1918	397,854	+1.25%
1939	589,198	+1.89%
1948	665,563	+1.36%
1960	757,440	+1.08%
1970	885,221	+1.57%

Year	Pop.	±% p.a.
1975	1,001,507	+2.51%
1980	1,096,432	+1.83%
1990	1,337,981	+2.01%
1995	1,415,022	+1.05%
2000	1,559,182	+2.10%
2007	1,691,878	+1.13%

Year	Pop.	±% p.a.
2010	1,805,576	+2.40%
2015	1,936,423	+1.34%
2020	2,051,899	+1.23%
2024	2,082,616	+0.36%

Excluding Iloilo City
Source: Philippine Statistics Authority

The population of Iloilo in the 2020 census was 2,051,899 people, with a density of 410 inhabitants per square kilometre or 1,100 inhabitants per square mile. If the highly urbanized city of Iloilo is included for statistical purposes, the province's total population is 2,509,525 people, with a density of 494/km^{2} (1,280/sq mi).

People from Iloilo are called Ilonggos. There are three local languages used in the province: Hiligaynon (Ilonggo), Kinaray-a and Capiznon. Hiligaynon and dialects/variants of it are spoken in Iloilo City and in some towns of the province, especially to the northeast. Tagalog and English are widely used as administrative, educational, and commercial languages.

=== Language ===
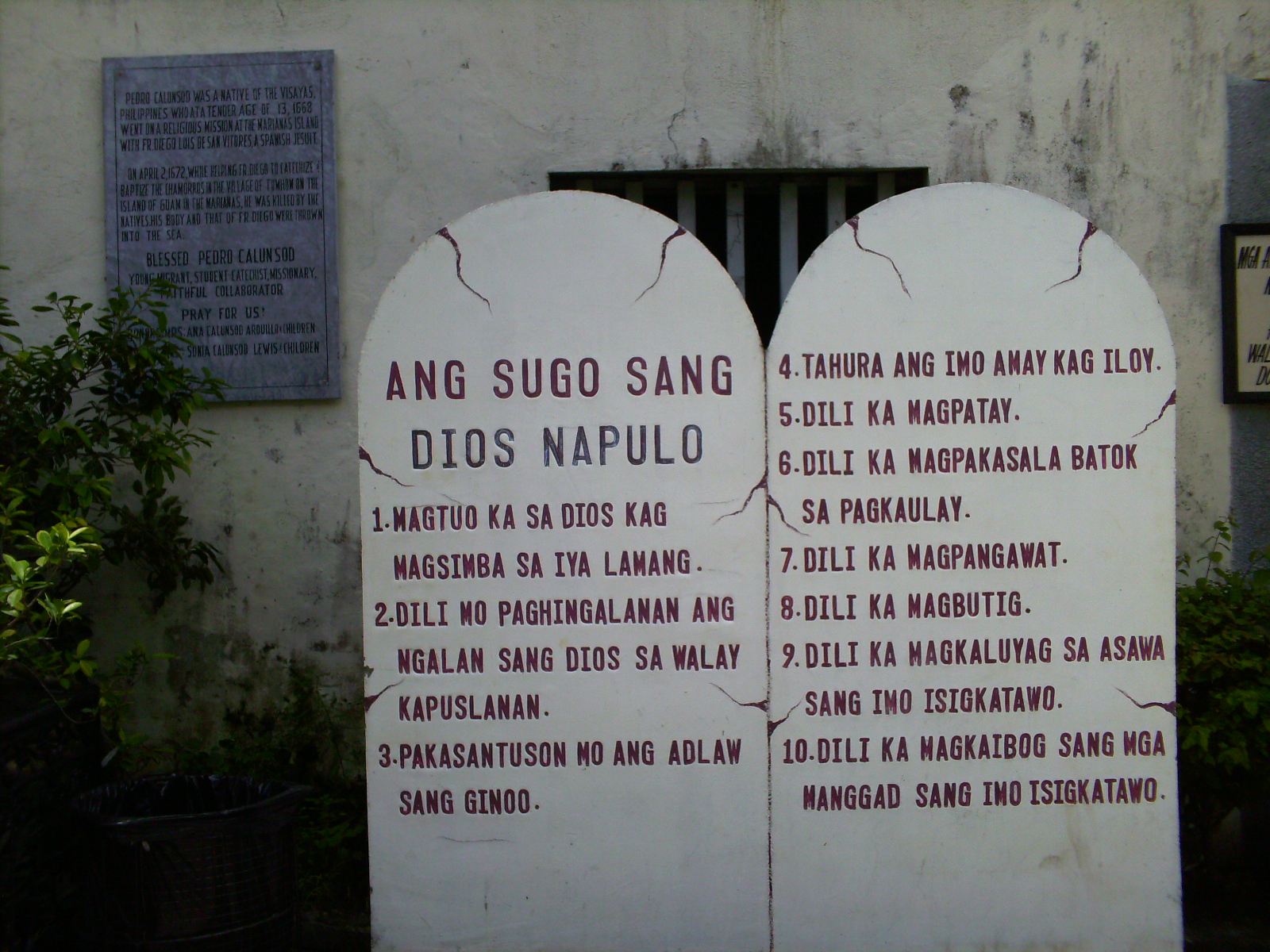
The Ten Commandments in Hiligaynon, the predominant language of Panay

Languages Spoken (2000)
Language	Speakers
Hiligaynon	899,108
Kinaray-a	148,307
Capiznon	2,913
Other Visayan languages	2,731
Others	11,815
Not Reported	7,596

Hiligaynon is concentrated in the city of Iloilo and surrounding areas, as well as the northeastern portion of the province, Guimaras and the Negros Island (especially in Negros Occidental and to a lesser extent in Negros Oriental), as well as the provinces of South Cotabato, Sultan Kudarat, and Cotabato in Soccsksargen, Mindanao. It is also spoken in the neighboring provinces, such as Capiz, Antique, Aklan, Masbate, Palawan and Romblon as well as in some parts of Maguindanao del Norte and Maguindanao del Sur. It is also spoken as a second language by Cebuano speakers in Negros Oriental, Kinaray-a speakers in Antique, Aklanon/Malaynon speakers in Aklan, and Capiznon speakers in Capiz, and also spoken and/or understood by speakers of Cebuano, Ilocano, Maguindanaon, B'laan, T'boli and other both native and non-native ethnic languages in Soccksargen, Mindanao.

The language is referred to as Ilonggo in Iloilo and Negros Occidental. More precisely, Ilonggo is an ethno-linguistic group referring to the people living in southeastern Panay and its associated culture. The boundaries of the language called Ilonggo and that called Hiligaynon are unclear. The disagreement of which name is correct extends to Philippine language specialists and native laypeople.

=== Religion ===
Iloilo is a Roman Catholic-predominated province comprising about 87% of the population. Independent Catholic and Protestant churches also exist such as members of Iglesia Filipina Independiente or Aglipayan Church, Baptists, Presbyterians, Methodists, Adventists, and other Evangelical Christians; There are also non-Protestant and other Christian sects such as Iglesia Ni Cristo, Church of Christ of Latter day Saints (Mormons) and Jehovah's Witnesses while non-Christians are usually represented by Muslims, and to a lesser extent, Buddhists and Hindus.

== Economy ==
Poverty incidence of Iloilo (%)

Source: Philippine Statistics Authority

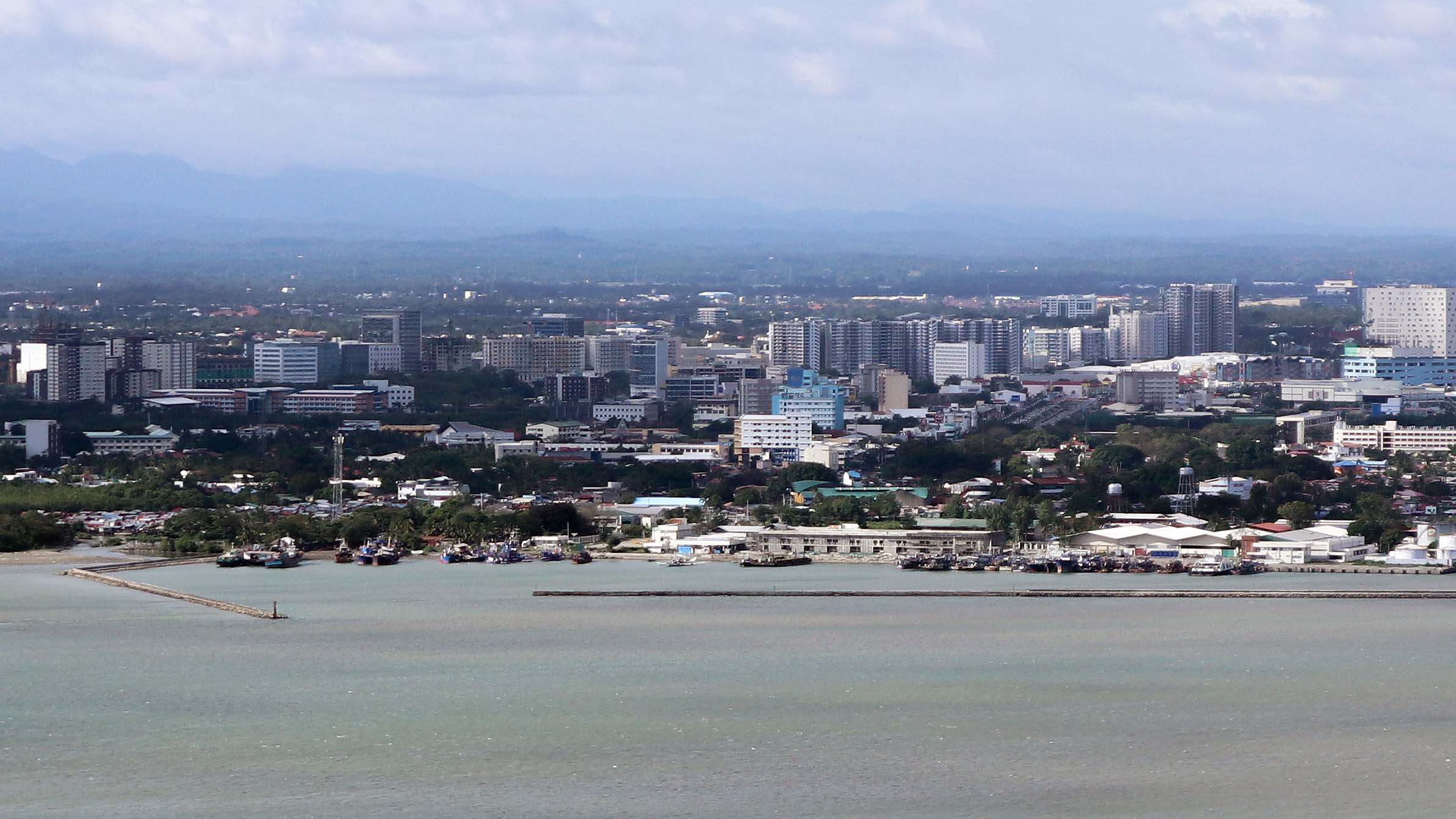
Iloilo City, the economic center of the province and the whole island of Panay.

Iloilo is considered one of the most competitive provinces in the Philippines, with a strong economy supported by effective governance, infrastructure development, and public-private partnership. In recent years, these factors have contributed to sustained economic growth, job generation, and rising provincial revenues, placing Iloilo among the country's wealthiest provinces.

Iloilo City, the provincial capital, is a major economic center in Western Visayas and ranks among the country's leading cities in terms of economic activity. It serves as the hub for commerce, finance, education, healthcare, real estate, and tourism, as well as the IT–BPO industry. The city also functions as an important port, supporting domestic and international trade.

Metro Iloilo, which includes the municipalities of Pavia, Oton, Leganes, and Santa Barbara, contributes substantially to the province's economic output. Pavia serves as an agricultural and industrial area with growing commercial and residential developments. Oton supports the economy through agricultural production and an expanding retail sector and is planned to host a major central business district. Leganes is known for its light industries and hosts the province's first agro-industrial economic zone, while Santa Barbara contributes through tourism, heritage sites, and local commerce.

Northern Iloilo has a strong fishing industry and a growing tourism sector, supported by its access to the Visayan Sea and coastal and marine resources. Central Iloilo functions primarily as an agri-industrial area, producing crops such as rice, corn, sugarcane, bananas, and pineapples. The highland areas of Leon and Alimodian, particularly Bucari, are known for high-value crops including strawberries and mangoes, as well as eco-tourism activities.

The sugar industry remains a major economic driver in Passi City and surrounding municipalities such as Lambunao, Dueñas, San Enrique, and Bingawan. In southern Iloilo, tourism plays a significant role, with heritage churches, historical landmarks, and coastal attractions in towns such as Tigbauan, Guimbal, Miagao, and San Joaquin contributing to local economic activity.

== Government ==
The government of Iloilo was established in 1566 when the Spanish settled a colonial center in Ogtong (now Oton). Control was later shifted to La Villa Rica de Arevalo (now Arevalo, Iloilo City) in 1581, which also served as the seat of the Spanish Government overseeing vast territories encompassing Iloilo, Capiz, Aklan, Antique, and surrounding islands such as Negros, Guimaras, Cuyo, Palawan, Caluya, Romblon, and Boracay. Over time, these territories gained independence. By 1616, the seat of government was transferred to La Punta, now known as Iloilo City Proper. This relocation marked a significant increase in colonial power, and the city's economy boomed, making it the largest in the Philippines after Manila during the Spanish period until the American period.

Iloilo Provincial Capitol is the seat of government of the province of Iloilo

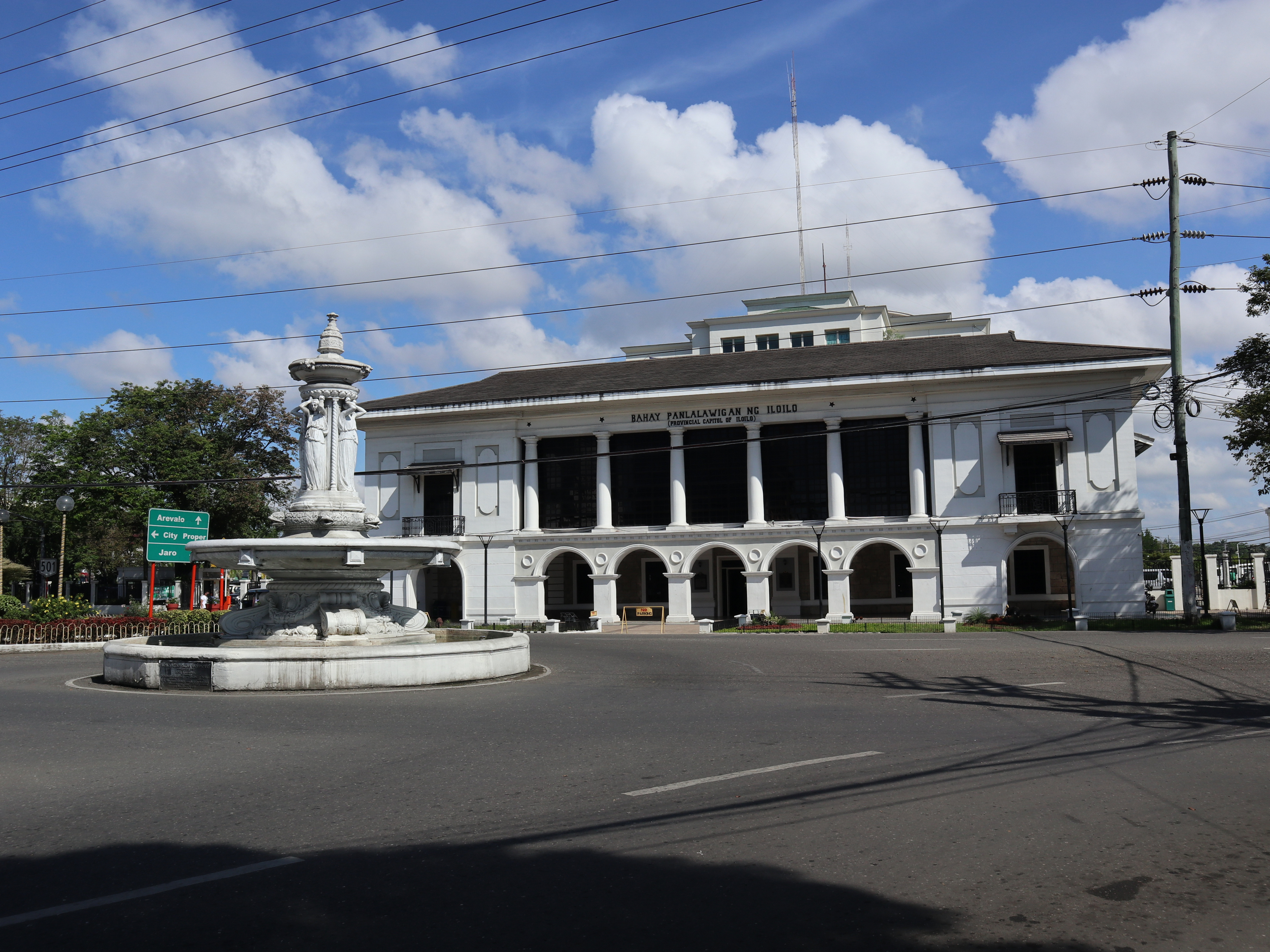
Casa Real de Iloilo, former seat of the Iloilo provincial government

The Governor of Iloilo serves as the local chief executive of the province, with the official office located at the Iloilo Provincial Capitol. Historically, the governor, along with the alcalde-mayor and presidente municipal, held office at the Casa Real de Iloilo from 1869 until 2006, when the larger capitol building adjacent to it was completed.

- Governor: Arthur R. Defensor, Jr.
- Vice Governor: Nathalie Ann F. Debuque

=== Provincial board members ===
1st District:

- Rica Jane L. Garin
- Jo Ann B. Germinanda

2nd District:

- June S. Mondejar
- Rolito C. Cajilig

3rd District:

- Mark P. Palabrica
- Jason R. Gonzales

4th District:

- Rolando B. Distura
- Dominic Paul C. Oso

5th District:

- Nielito C. Tupas
- Rolex T. Suplico

Ex-officio Board Members:

- PCL President: Jo Jan Paul J. Peñol
- LNB President: Amalia Victoria F. Debuque
- PPSK President: Esara Andica A. Javier

=== District Representatives ===
- 1st District: Janette L. Garin
- 2nd District: Kathryn Joyce F. Gorriceta
- 3rd District: Lorenz R. Defensor
- 4th District: Ferjenel G. Biron
- 5th District: Binky April M. Tupas

== Culture ==
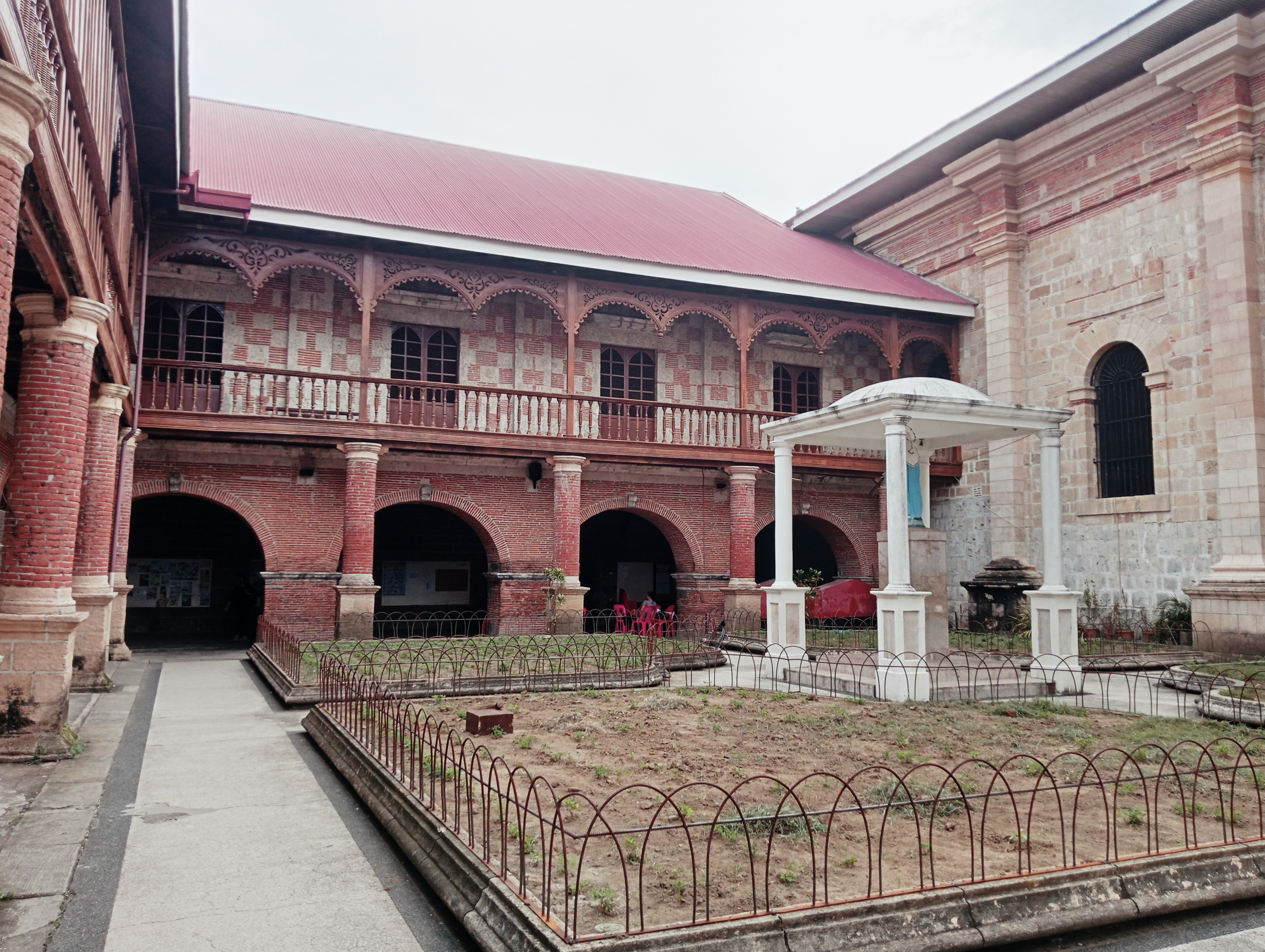
Maravillas Garden in Santa Barbara

The old buildings in downtown Iloilo showcase the influence of Spanish architecture, reflecting the historical presence of the Spaniards in the region. However, even before the arrival of the Mexicans, Spaniards, and other Europeans, Iloilo had already established trade relations with ancient Indonesians, Malaysians and Vietnamese, Indian, Arab, Chinese, Korean and Japanese merchants. The Spanish government encouraged foreign merchants to trade in Iloilo, although they were not granted land ownership privileges. Over time, intermarriage between foreign merchants, Spaniards, and the locals led to the emergence of the Mestizo class, who eventually became the ruling class of the Ilonggos, known as the Principalía.

Iloilo is also home to two of the nation's cultural minorities: the Sulod-Bukidnon and the Ati. These indigenous groups contribute to the cultural diversity of the province and add to its vibrant tapestry of traditions and customs.

=== Festivals ===
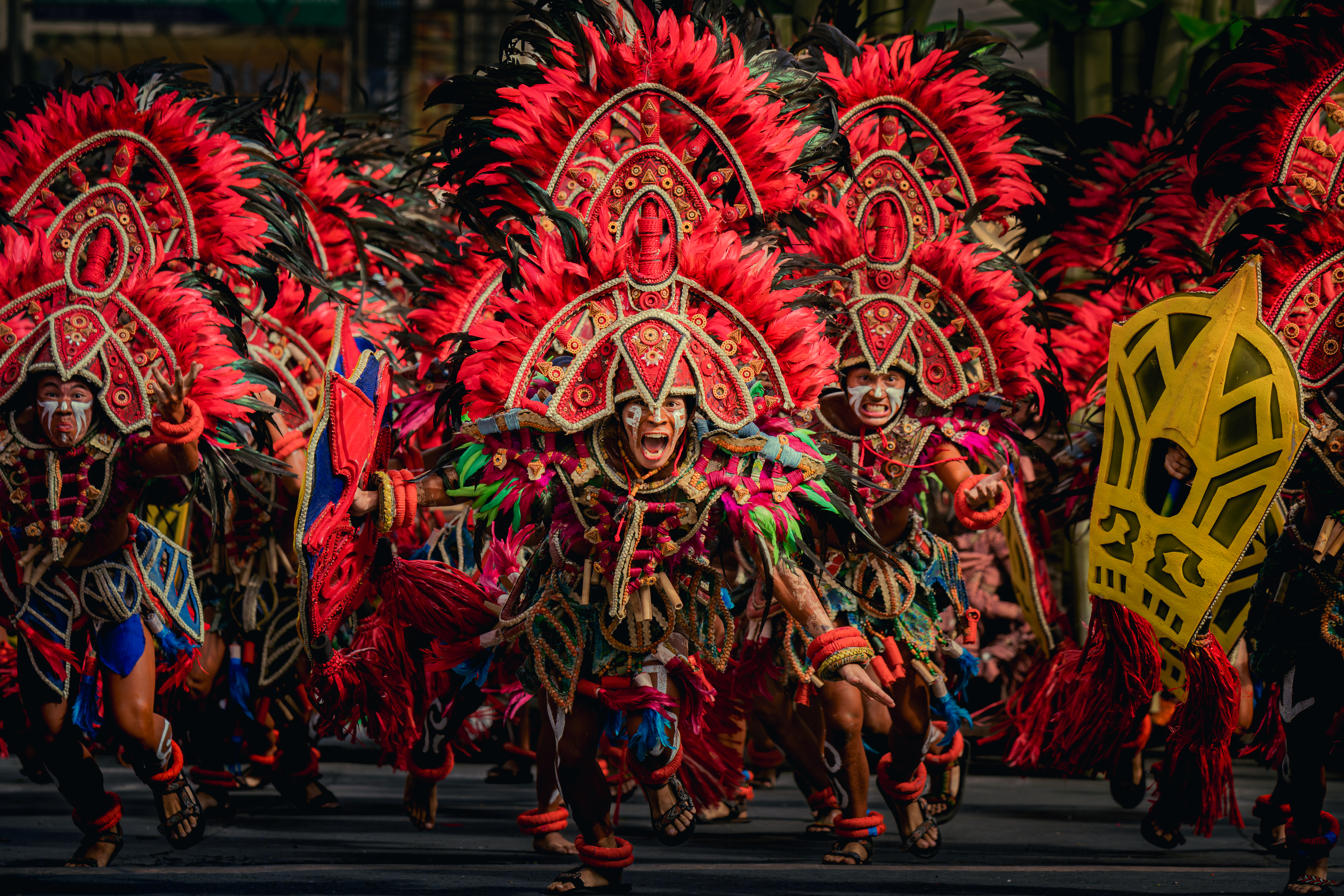
Dinagyang Festival, one of the largest festivals in the Philippines.

Iloilo is dubbed as the "Festival Capital of the Philippines" with various renowned festivals in the country celebrated in the province. The Dinagyang Festival is the most popular and largest festival in Iloilo, held every January in honor of the Santo Niño in Iloilo City. It features elaborate street dancing, vibrant costumes, and a festive atmosphere that attracts both locals and tourists. The Kasadyahan Festival, which is celebrated during the Dinagyang, is a competition among cultural festivals from different parts of Iloilo and Western Visayas. The Paraw Regatta Festival is another significant event, celebrating the traditional sailboats known as paraws. This festival includes boat races, cultural presentations, and various activities showcasing the maritime culture of Iloilo. Jaro Fiesta, held every February, is a religious and cultural celebration in honor of the Nuestra Señora de la Candelaria (Our Lady of Candles), featuring processions, a grand fair, and traditional performances. The Pintados de Pasi is a cultural festival honors the tribal tradition of body painting known as pintados in Passi City.

Every municipality, barangay, and district in the province and city of Iloilo, has its own cultural, social, and religious festivals. Many of these festivals hold religious significance, honoring deities, saints, or important religious events. Others commemorate historical milestones such as independence days, national holidays, or significant local happenings. Some festivals focus on social bonding, bringing people together and fostering a strong sense of community.

=== Cuisine ===
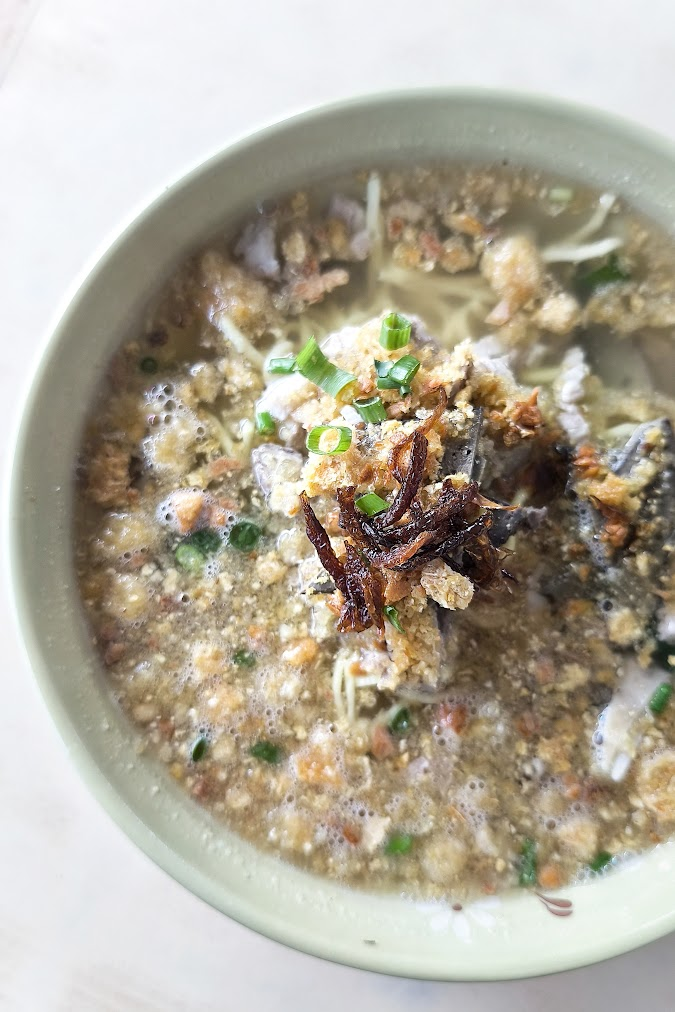
La Paz Batchoy, one of the most popular dishes from Iloilo.

Its capital city, Iloilo City has been recognized as a UNESCO Creative City of Gastronomy. It is renowned for its distinctive and flavorful cuisine including La Paz Batchoy, a hearty noodle soup with pork innards, liver, and crunchy chicharon. Pancit Molo, a dumpling soup named after the Molo district, features wonton-style dumplings in a savory broth. Iloilo is also known for its Biscocho, a type of toasted bread topped with butter and sugar, and Barquillos, thin rolled wafers that are delightfully crispy. Seafood is abundant, and dishes like Grilled Talaba (oysters) and Kinilaw (raw fish marinated in vinegar and spices) are local favorites. Another local item is siopao, a steamed bun with a variety of fillings. Tinuom, a native dish of Cabatuan, is made up of native chickens seasoned with onions, tomatoes and lemon grass (tanglad) wrapped in banana leaves. Baye baye, a well-known local dish of Pavia, made from grated young coconut mixed with either newly harvested rice (pinipig) or corn and shaped into patties.

== Tourism ==
=== Heritage sites ===
Iloilo played an important role during the Spanish colonial period and is known for its well-preserved heritage structures, many of which reflect architectural influences similar to those found in Latin America. Spanish-era churches are among the province's most prominent tourist attractions.

One of the most notable is Miag-ao Church, a UNESCO World Heritage Site, recognized for its Baroque design with indigenous elements, including carved botanical motifs on its façade. Molo Church, built in the Gothic-Renaissance style, was historically used as a watchtower and is distinguished by statues of female saints, earning it the nickname "feminist church." Jaro Cathedral features a Neo-Romanesque design and is notable for its freestanding Jaro Belfry located across the street from the main church. Cabatuan Church, the largest red-brick church in the Visayas, is known for its Neoclassical style and three-façade design. San Jose Church, located near Plaza Libertad, is considered the oldest church in Iloilo City and is noted for its Byzantine-Neoclassical architecture and its association with the Santo Niño de Cebú, the patron of the Dinagyang Festival.

Plaza Libertad is a historically significant plaza where the flag of the First Philippine Republic was raised following Spain's surrender of Iloilo to revolutionary forces on December 25, 1898.

In southern Iloilo, San Joaquin Church is known for its large sculpted pediment depicting the Battle of Tetuan and has been declared a National Cultural Treasure, along with the nearby San Joaquin Campo Santo, a Spanish Baroque cemetery chapel. Passi City Church is a fortress-style structure with massive buttresses, built after earlier churches were destroyed by natural disasters. The Casa Real de Iloilo, a National Historical Site, served as the provincial capitol following the establishment of civil government in 1901.

Santa Barbara Church is recognized as the "Cradle of Independence" in Panay and the Visayas, as it was the site of the revolutionary junta led by General Martin Delgado prior to the first Cry of Revolution outside Luzon. The Calle Real Heritage Zone contains several preserved colonial-era buildings, including the Eusebio Villanueva Building, formerly the International Hotel. The Iloilo Golf and Country Club, established in the 1850s by British Vice Consul Nicholas Loney, is recognized as the oldest golf course in Southeast Asia.

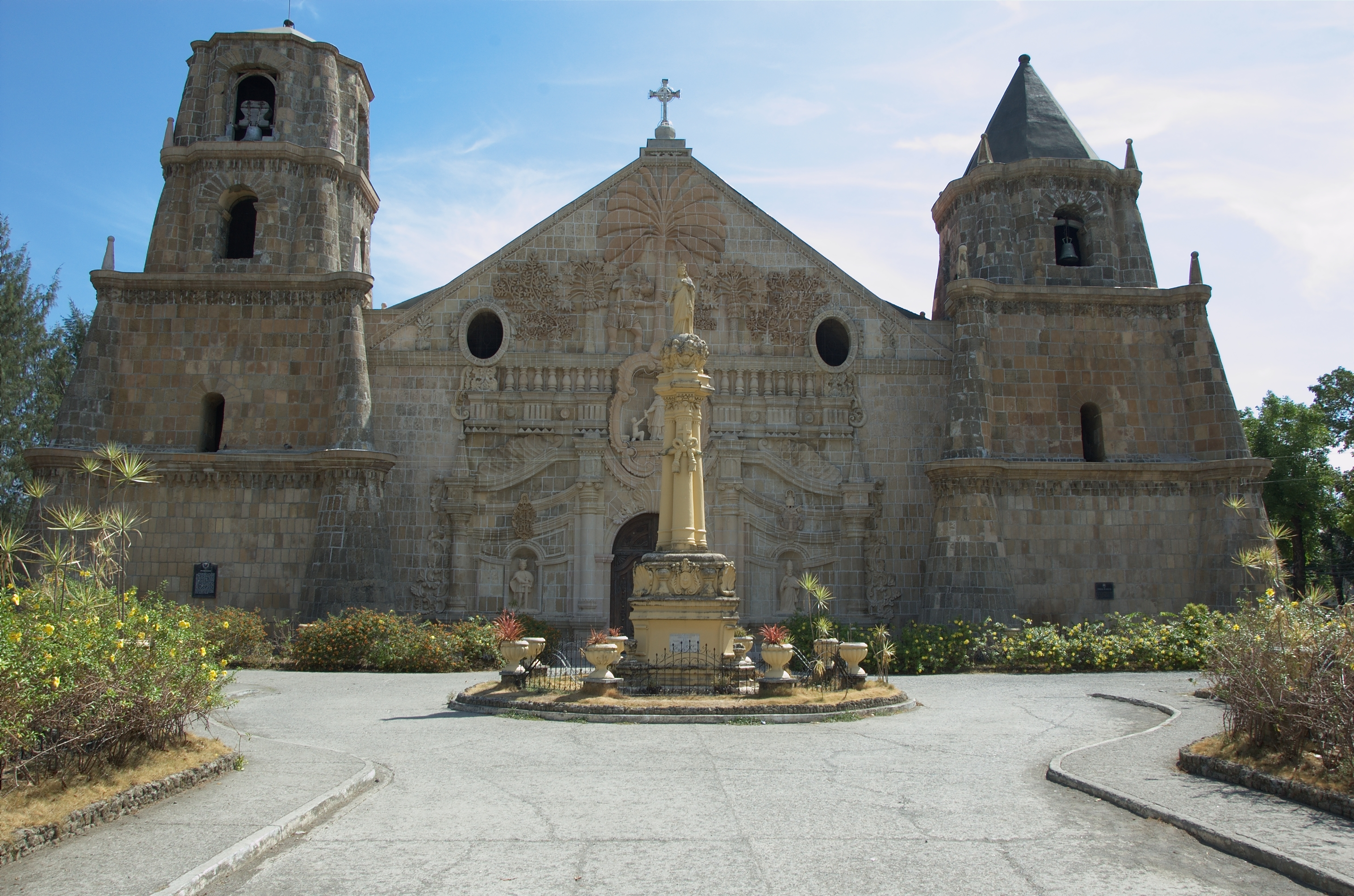
The Miag-ao Church is one of the Baroque Churches of the Philippines.

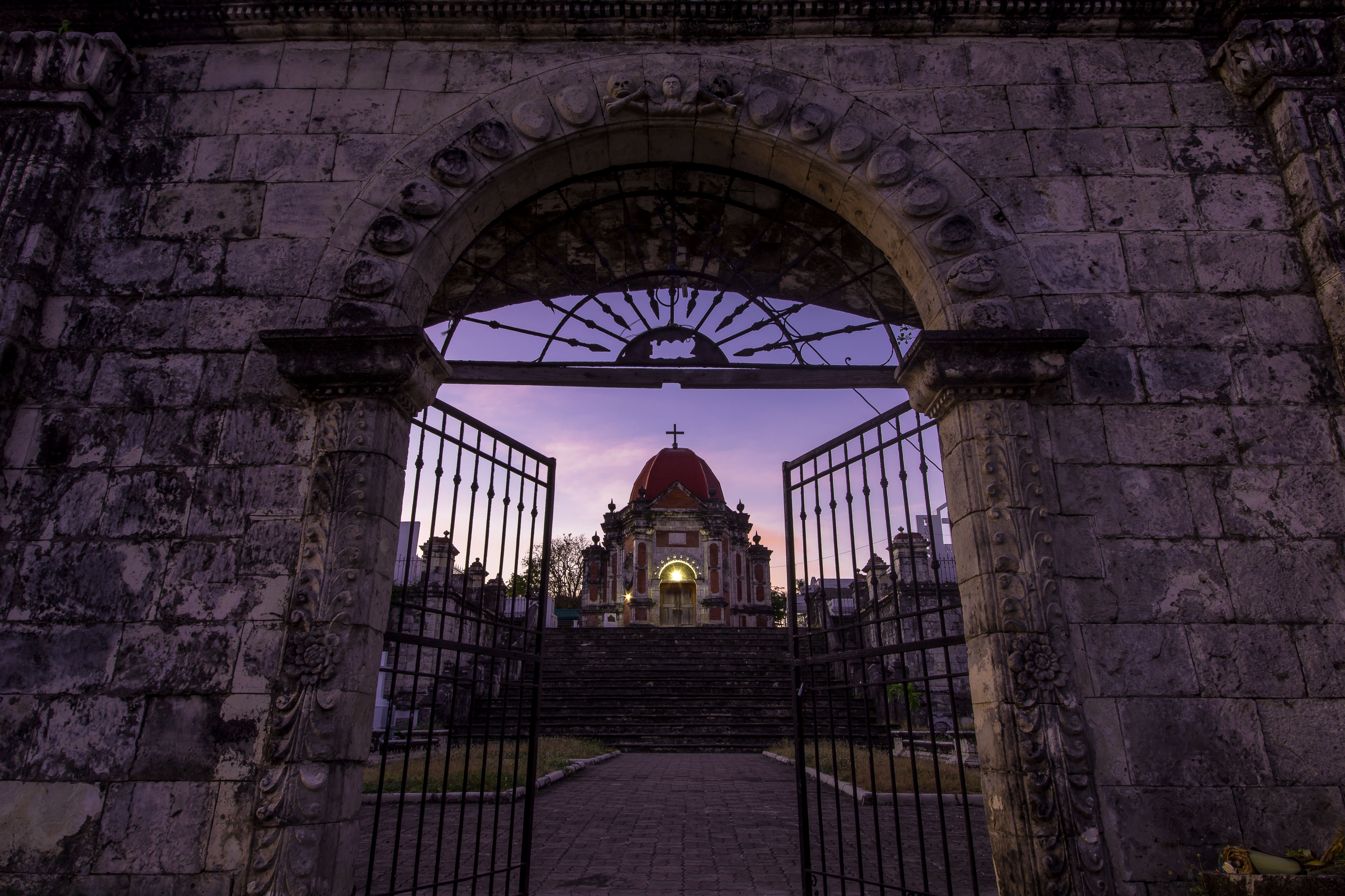
The San Joaquin Campo Santo is one of the oldest and well preserved cemeteries in the Philippines.

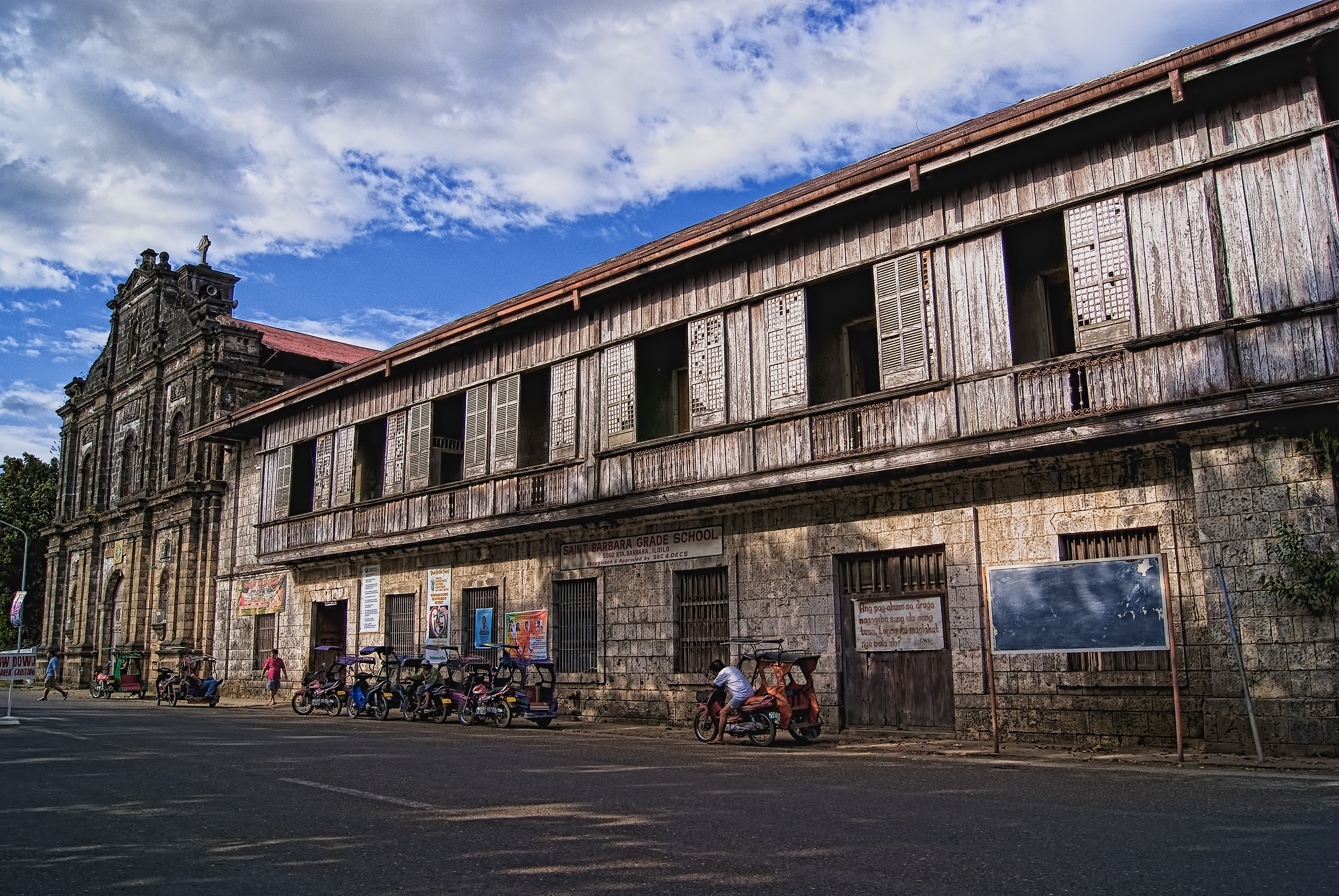
The Santa Barbara Church is one of the National Cultural Tresures in Iloilo.

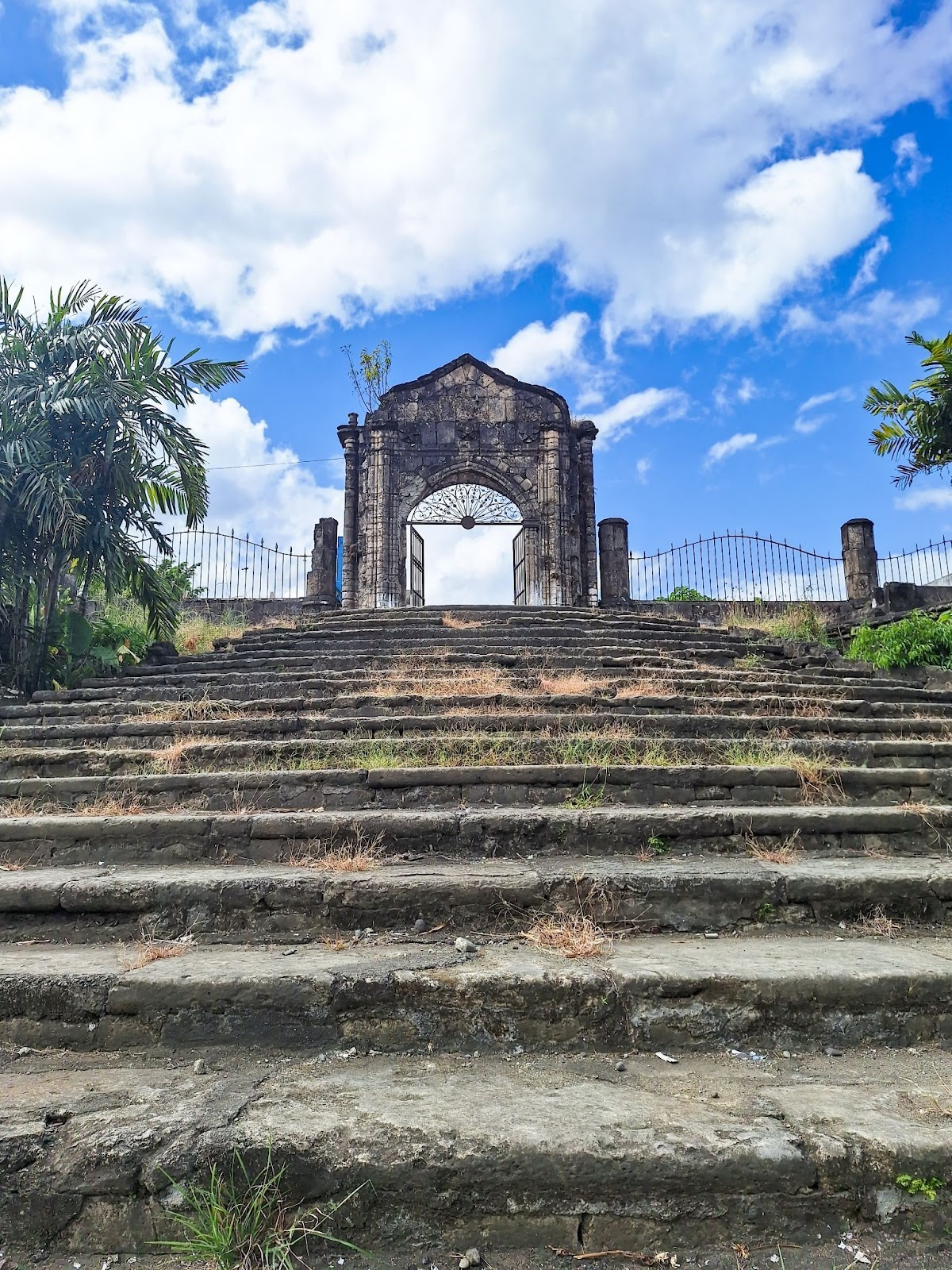
Janiuay Cemetery

=== Natural attractions ===
The province also features a range of natural attractions that contribute to its tourism sector. Bucari, located in the highlands of Leon, is often referred to as the "Summer Capital of Iloilo" due to its cooler climate and mountainous landscape. Bulabog Putian National Park, a protected rainforest area spanning the municipalities of San Enrique and Dingle, is known for its diverse flora and fauna and more than 30 limestone caves.

Mount Napulak in Igbaras, one of the highest peaks in Iloilo, is a popular destination for hiking and mountaineering. Off the northern coast of the province lies the Islas de Gigantes, an island group in the municipality of Carles known for island-hopping, white sand beaches, lagoons, clear waters, and distinctive rock formations. Cabugao Gamay, the most popular island in the group, is noted for its sandbar-like formation connecting two islets. Sicogon Island, also located in Carles and south of the Islas de Gigantes, is a resort island undergoing tourism development, including projects led by Ayala Land, Inc.

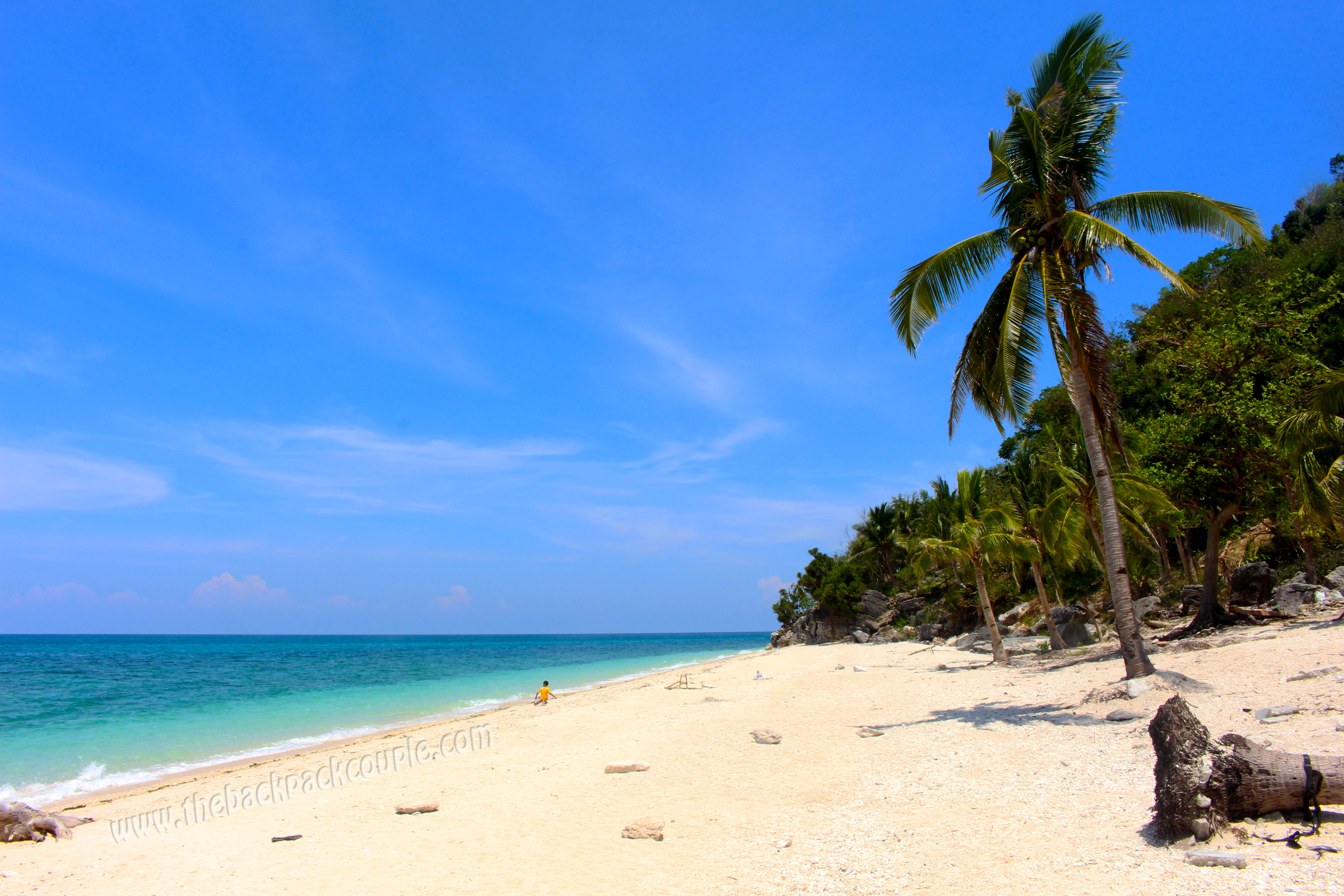
Antonia Beach

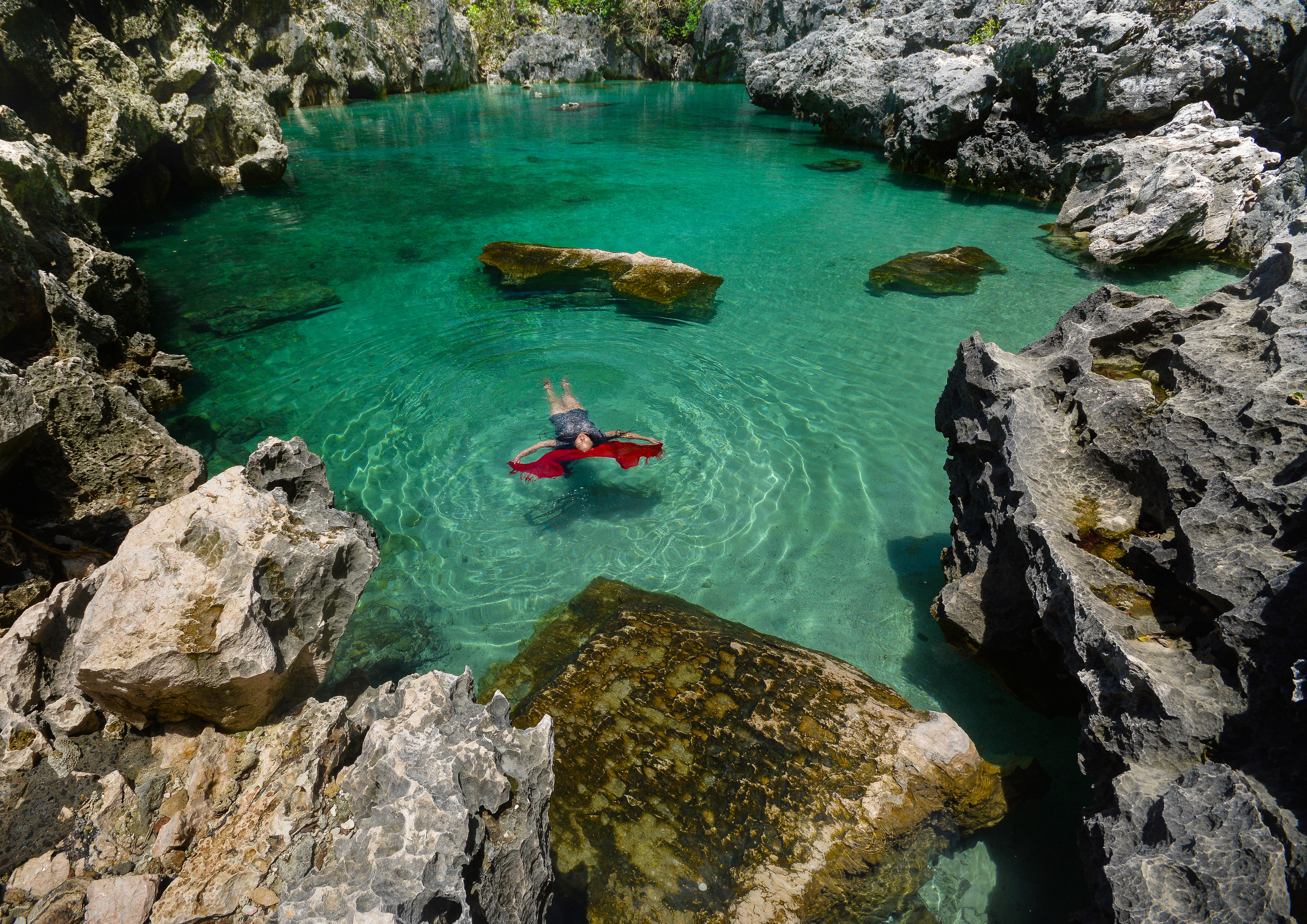
Tangke Lagoon in the Gigantes Islands.

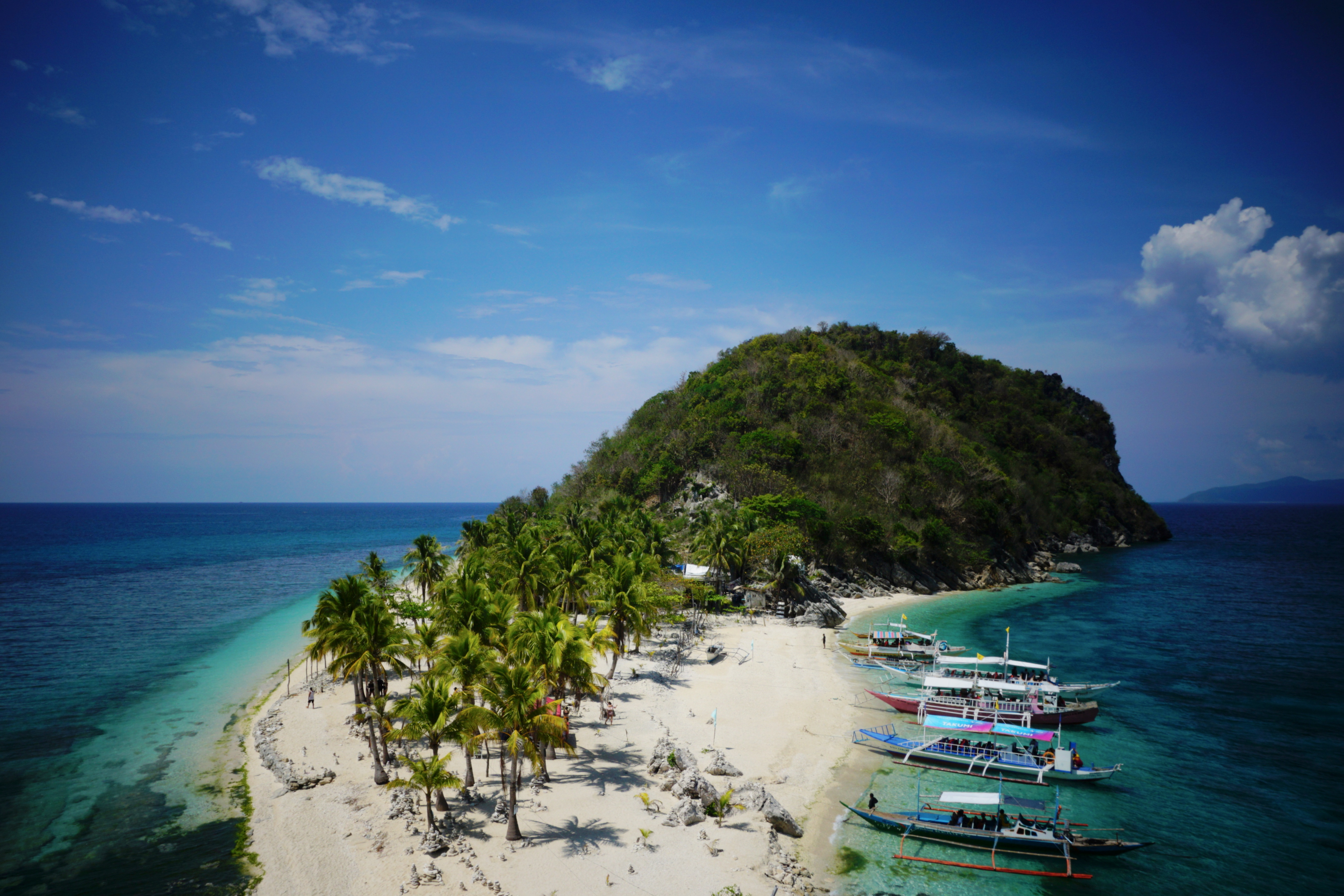
Cabugao Gamay Island, a selfie island in Islas de Gigantes.

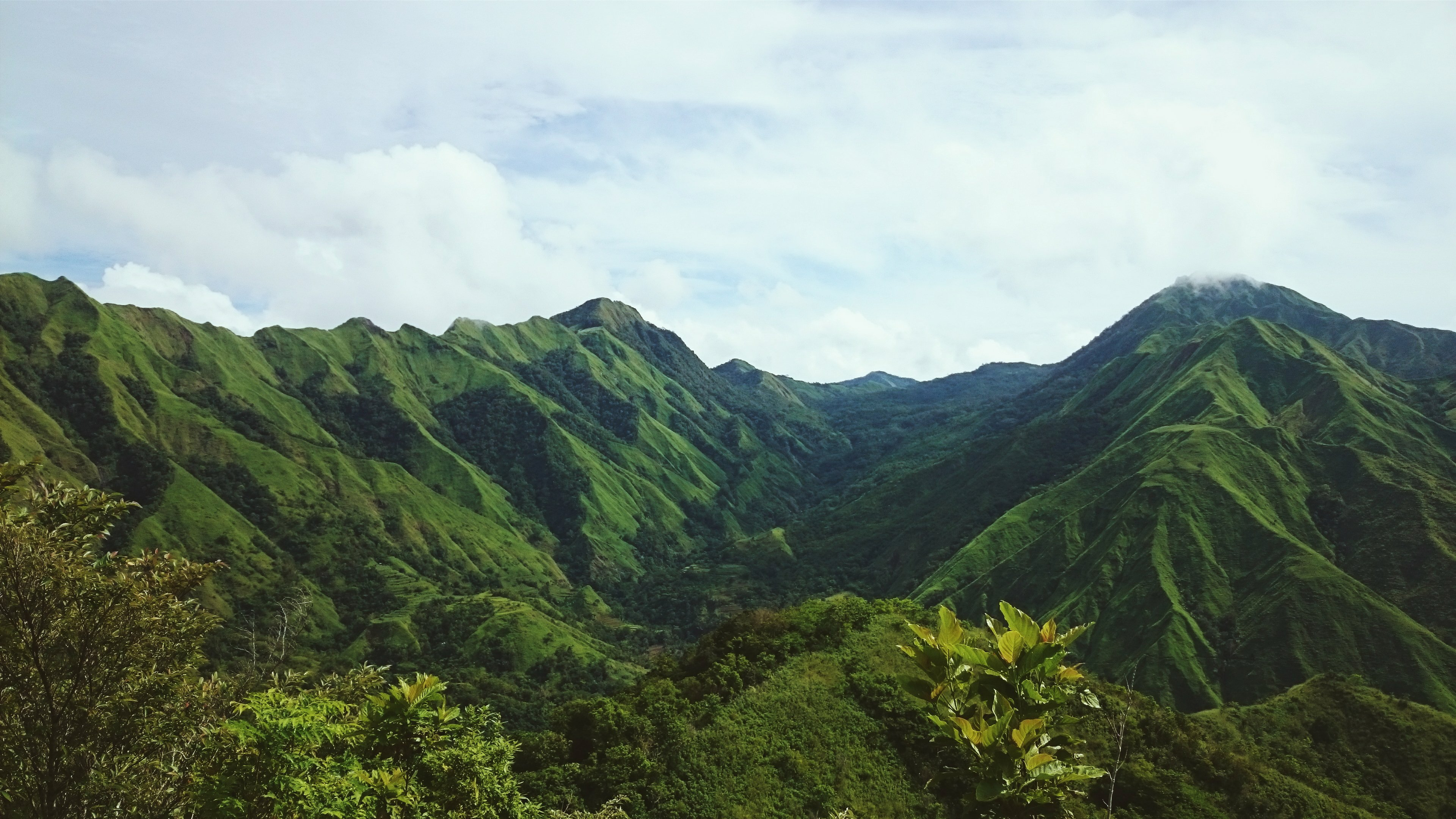
Mount Napulak, a popular mountain for hikers.

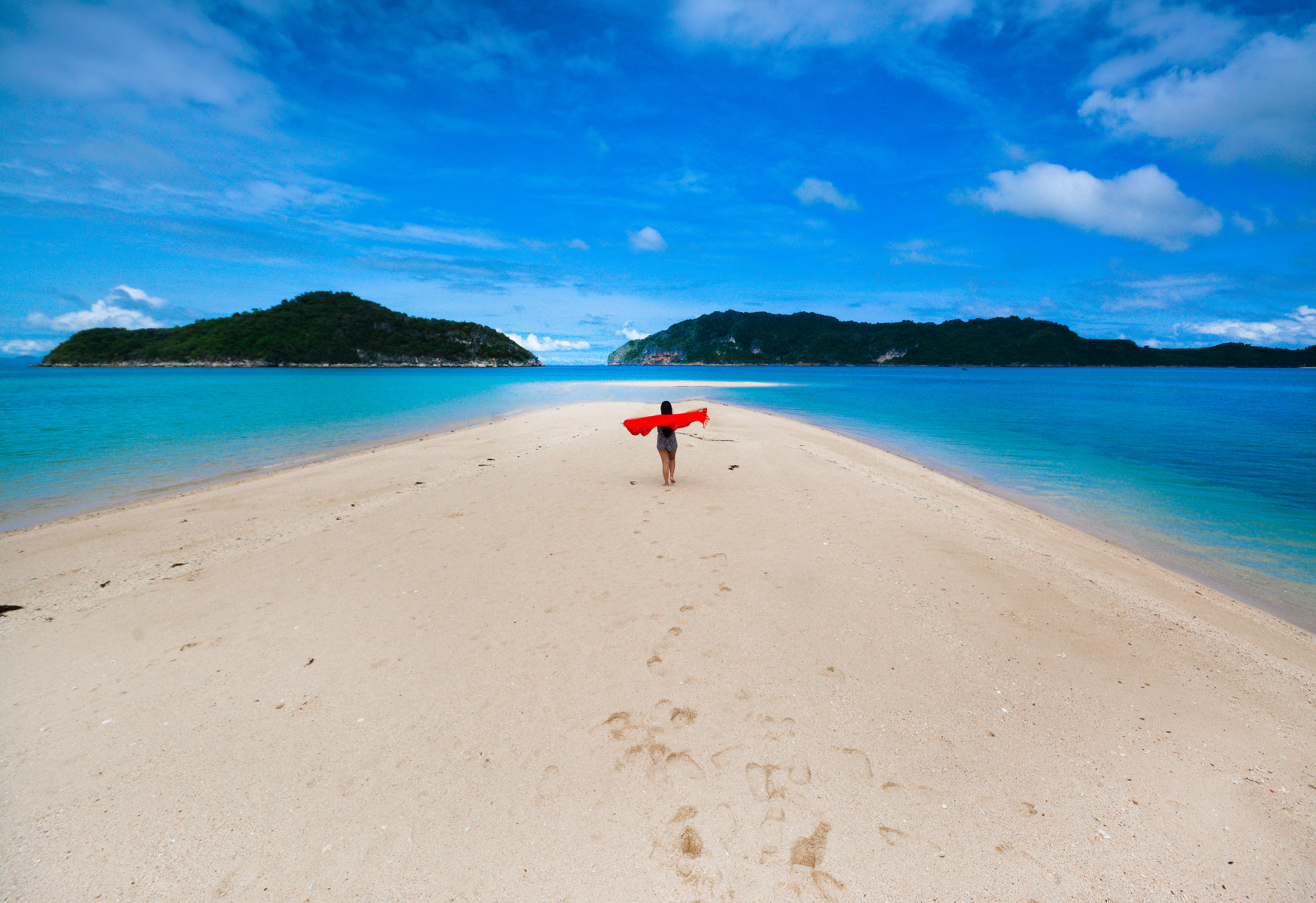
Bantigue Island Sandbar

== Infrastructure ==
=== Iloilo International Airport ===
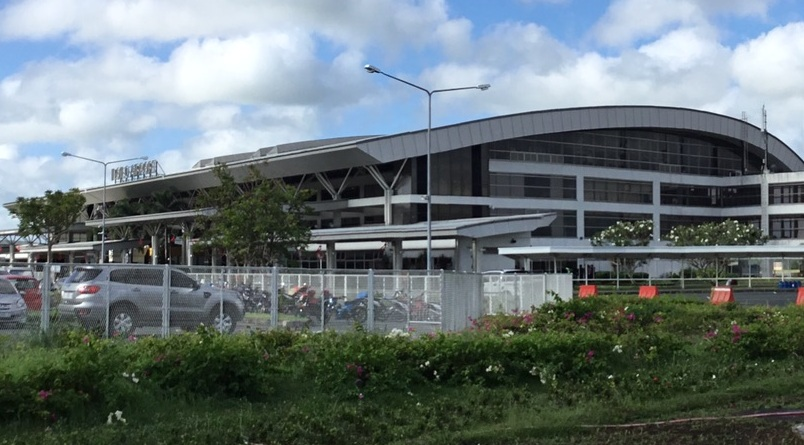
Iloilo International Airport terminal building.

The airport serves the Province of Iloilo, including its capital city, Iloilo City, the regional center of the Western Visayas region in the Philippines. It opened its doors to commercial traffic on June 14, 2007, after a decade of planning and construction located at Cabatuan, Iloilo, replacing Mandurriao Airport in Mandurriao, Iloilo City and inherited its IATA and ICAO airport codes from its predecessor. The fourth-busiest airport in the Philippines, it is the first airport in both Western Visayas and the island of Panay to be built to international standards, and one of the four airports in the region planned to be an international gateway. It is one of two international airports in Western Visayas, the others being Kalibo International Airport.

==== Sicogon Airport ====
The airport serves tourists to the island of Sicogon in Carles, Iloilo. The airport has been redeveloped and opened in 2018. Charter flights to and from Sicogon to Manila and vice versa took place in late 2018. It is located in Barangay San Fernando on the island.

=== Iloilo Port Complex ===
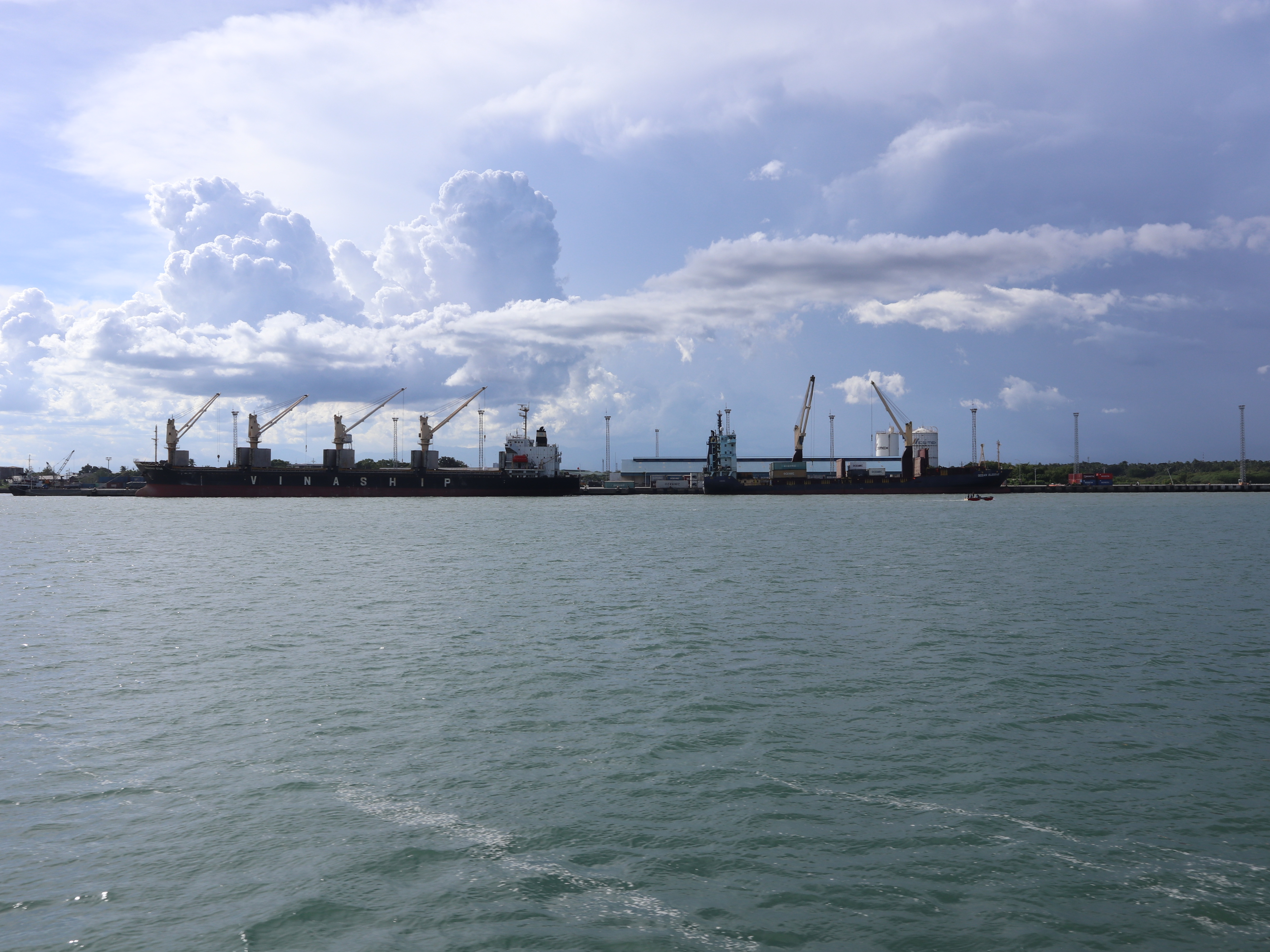
Visayas Container Terminal in Iloilo International Port

The Port of Iloilo, considered the leader of trade and a commercial hub for Western Visayas is also one of the safest natural seaports in the Philippines. The Iloilo Commercial Port Complex is located on 20.8 hectares of reclaimed land. It includes 11,400 sq. meters of open space for operations, supplemented by an area of 97,000 sq. meters, a crane, rails of 348 lineal meters; roll-on-roll-off support; a 7,800 container freight stations; and a 720 sq. meter passenger shed. The port complex is ideal for ships plying international routes having a berth length of 400 meters, a width of 26.26 meters and a berthing depth of 10.50 meters.

A number of shipping companies use the Port of Iloilo, including Lorenzo Shipping Corporation, 2GO, Amigo Shipping Company, New Panay Shipping Company, Sulpicio Lines, and Trans-Asia Shipping Lines Inc. Fast ferries serve Iloilo-Bacolod routes eight times daily. 2GO inter-island, overnight ferries serve longer routes, going to Manila, Bacolod, Cebu, Zamboanga and Cagayan de Oro City. Pumpboat ferries cross the Iloilo Strait to Guimaras constantly during the day and on special trips at night.

Roll-on/roll-off ferry service, known as RO-RO, is available between Iloilo City and Guimaras, but the ro-ro to Negros is available from Dumangas, Iloilo including ro-ro from Iloilo to Palawan.

It is ranked third in terms of ship calls at 11,853, fourth in cargo throughout at 491,719 million metric tons and fourth in passenger traffic at 2.4 million annually.

=== Panay–Guimaras–Negros Bridge ===
The Iloilo–Guimaras Bridge, a component of the larger Panay-Guimaras-Negros Bridge project, is currently undergoing a feasibility study and is scheduled to begin construction in 2025. Once completed, it will reconnect Iloilo to its former sub-province of Guimaras.

=== Iloilo–Capiz–Aklan Expressway ===
The Iloilo-Capiz-Aklan Expressway (ICAEx) is a proposed expressway on the island of Panay that will link the provinces of Iloilo, Capiz, and Aklan. Its entry point will be located in Leganes, where the proposed approach of the Panay-Guimaras Bridge, a component of the Panay-Guimaras-Negros Bridge project, is situated.

=== Panay Railways ===
Panay Railways has been proposed for revival to restore its defunct rail connections between Iloilo City and several key destinations in the province and across Panay, including Passi, Roxas, Kalibo, Malay (Aklan), and San Jose (Antique). The railway previously had stations in Iloilo City and Santa Barbara, in Iloilo province.

=== Jalaur Dam ===
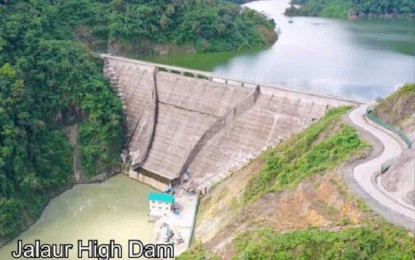
Jalaur High Dam with a maximum capacity of 250 million cubic meters, one of the largest in the Philippines.

The Jalaur Dam or more formally known as the Jalaur River Multi-Purpose Project Stage II (JRMP II) located in the municipality of Calinog, Iloilo, is the first major water reservoir developed in the Visayas and Mindanao. It also serves as the National Irrigation Administration's flagship initiative in Western Visayas. The project is designed to promote inclusive growth by utilizing the Jalaur River for a range of purposes. It is projected to boost rice production by more than 300 metric tons, providing year-round irrigation to 31,840 hectares of farmland and benefiting roughly 25,000 farming households. In addition, it will supply Iloilo City with an estimated 86,000 cubic meters of water daily and generate about 6.8 megawatts of electricity.

== Accessibility ==
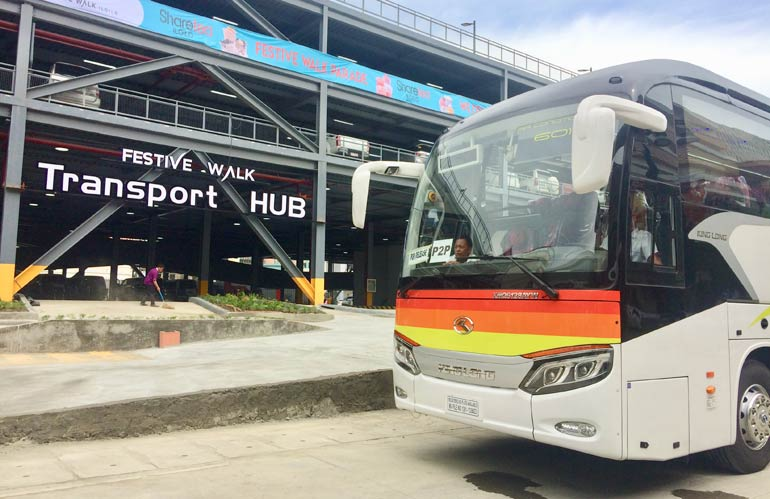
Festive Walk Transport Hub and the Premium Point-to-Point (P2P) Bus servicing Iloilo City to Iloilo International, Kalibo International, and Caticlan Airports and vice versa.

Iloilo is one of the most accessible provinces in the Philippines. Iloilo can be reached by plane on regular commercial international flights from Hong Kong, Bangkok, and Singapore to the Iloilo International Airport. Direct domestic flights connect Iloilo to other major cities in the Philippines including Manila, Cebu, Davao, General Santos, Puerto Princesa, Zamboanga and Cagayan de Oro. Direct ferry routes and roll-on roll-off connections on the Philippines' nautical highway are also available between Iloilo and all other major cities in the country.

By plane, travel time to the Iloilo takes around 1 hour from Manila, 30 minutes from Cebu, 2 hours and 30 minutes from Hong Kong, 3 hours and 50 minutes from Bangkok, and 3 hours and 30 minutes from Singapore. By direct ferry, Iloilo is approximately 1.5 hours away from Bacolod, and 15 minutes away from Guimaras. By land, Iloilo is around 4–5 hours away from Boracay, 3 hours away from Kalibo, and 2 hours away from Roxas City.

=== Iloilo transportation gateways ===
Iloilo International Airport – The Iloilo International Airport is the primary gateway to Iloilo. It serves regularly scheduled direct domestic flights to Iloilo from major Philippine airlines including Manila, Cebu, Davao, General Santos, Puerto Princesa, and Cagayan de Oro. The airport also serves international flights from Iloilo to Hong Kong, Bangkok, and Singapore. Flights to Iloilo are served by Cebu Pacific, Philippine Airlines, PAL Express, and TigerAir. The Iloilo Airport is located approximately 19 kilometers or 20 minutes away by taxi from Iloilo City.

Iloilo Seaports – Ferries in Iloilo depart and arrive at various seaports in Iloilo City and Iloilo Province depending on the route and vessel type. (1) Ferry terminals along the Iloilo River in Lapuz district, Iloilo City serves fastcraft ferries to and from Bacolod, RORO ferries to and from Guimaras, and ferries to and from Palawan. (2) The Iloilo Domestic Port in Fort San Pedro, Iloilo City Proper, serves shipping companies with routes to and from Manila, Cebu, Cagayan de Oro, and Zamboanga.

== Universities and colleges ==
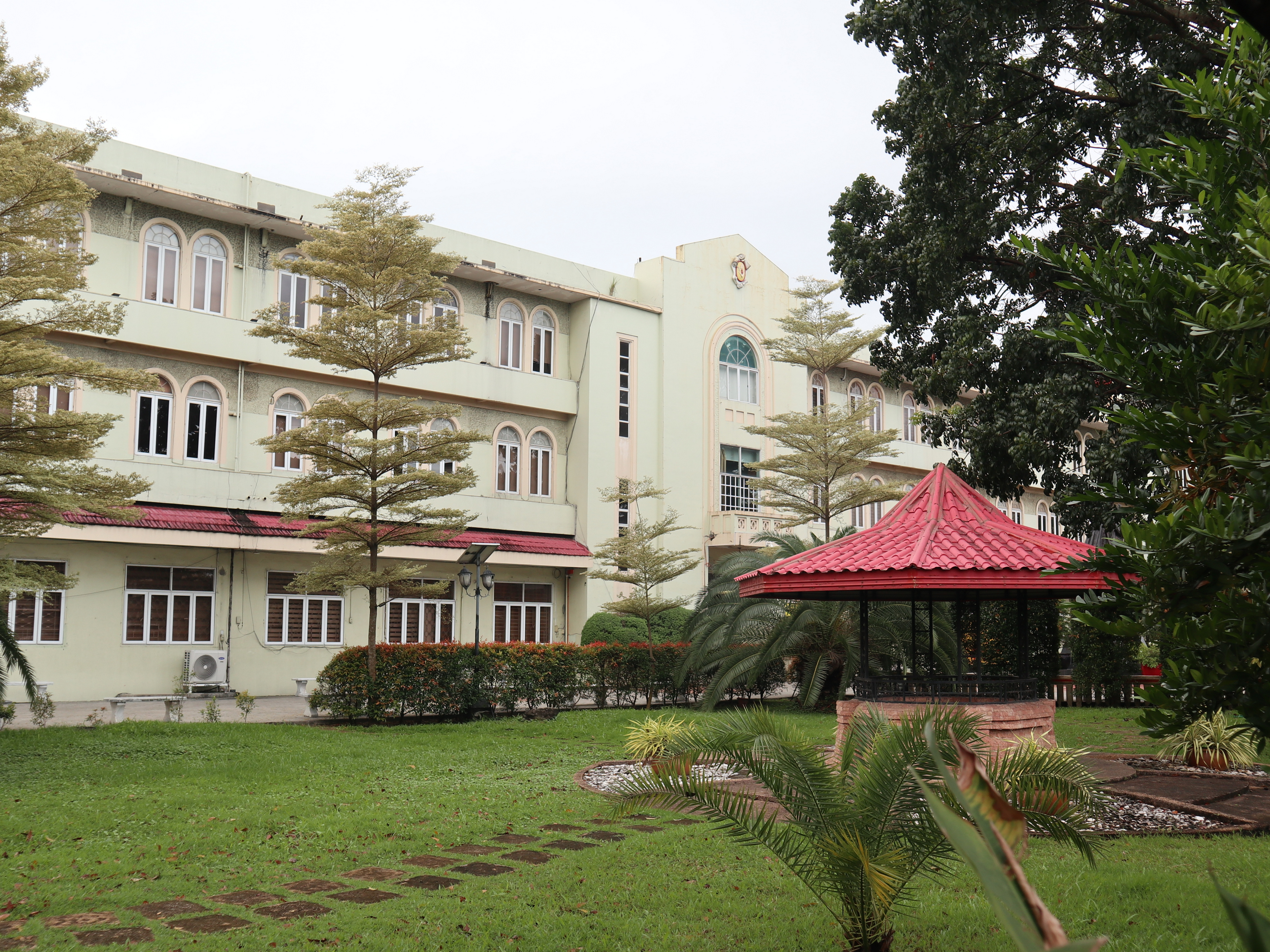
Herrera Hall at the University of San Agustin, the first university in Western Visayas.

The province of Iloilo, including the city of Iloilo, is a major center of education in the Western Visayas region. It is home to one of the largest numbers of universities in the country, with a total of ten major institutions. Two notable universities are also set to open new campuses in the city and province of Iloilo: the University of St. La Salle in Pavia and National University in Mandurriao, Iloilo City.

Universities:

- Central Philippine University, Jaro, Iloilo City
- Iloilo Science and Technology University, La Paz, Iloilo City (with branch campuses in Barotac Nuevo, Leon and Miag-ao)
- Iloilo State University of Science and Technology, Barotac Nuevo (with branch campuses in Dingle, Dumangas, and San Enrique)
- John B. Lacson Foundation Maritime University, Molo, Iloilo City (with branch campus in Arevalo, Iloilo City)
- Northern Iloilo State University, Estancia (with branch campuses in Ajuy, Barotac Viejo, Batad, Concepcion, Lemery, and Sara)
- St. Paul University Iloilo, Iloilo City Proper
- University of Iloilo, Iloilo City Proper
- University of San Agustin, Iloilo City Proper (with branch campus in Jaro, Iloilo City)
- University of the Philippines Visayas, Iloilo City Proper and Miag-ao (Main Campus)
- West Visayas State University, La Paz, Iloilo City (with branch campuses in Calinog, Janiuay, Lambunao/CAF, Lambunao/East, and Pototan)

Colleges:

- ABBA Institute of Technology, Iloilo City Proper
- ACSI College Iloilo, Iloilo City Proper
- ABE International Business College (Iloilo campus), Iloilo City Proper
- AMA Computer College (Iloilo campus), Iloilo City Proper
- Asian College of Aeronautics, Jaro, Iloilo City
- Cabalum Western College, Iloilo City Proper
- Colegio de San Jose, Jaro, Iloilo City
- Colegio del Sagrado Corazon de Jesus, Iloilo City Proper
- Computer College of the Visayas, Iloilo City Proper
- De Paul College, Jaro, Iloilo City
- FAST Aviation Academy Inc. Iloilo, Jaro, Iloilo City
- Gov. Angel Medina Foundation College, Passi City
- Great Saviour College, La Paz, Iloilo City
- Hua Siong College of Iloilo, Iloilo City Proper
- Iloilo City Community College, Molo, Iloilo City
- Iloilo Doctors' College, Molo, Iloilo City
- Iloilo Doctors' College of Medicine, Molo, Iloilo City
- Iloilo State College of Fisheries, Barotac Nuevo
- Iloilo Technical College, Iloilo City Proper
- Integrated Midwives Association of the Philippines Foundation School of Midwifery, La Paz, Iloilo City
- Interface Computer College (Iloilo campus), Iloilo City Proper
- Leon Ganzon Polythechnic College, Balasan
- New Lucena Polytechnic College, New Lucena
- Passi City College, Passi City
- Philippine College of Aeronautics, Science and Technology, Jaro, Iloilo City
- Pius XII College Iloilo, Jaro, Iloilo City
- St. Anne College of Iloilo, Mandurriao, Iloilo City
- St. Therese – MTC colleges, Molo, Iloilo City (with branch campuses in La Paz, Iloilo City and Tigbauan)
- St. Vincent College of Science and Technology, Leganes
- St. Vincent Ferrer Seminary, Jaro, Iloilo City
- STI College (Iloilo campus), Iloilo City Proper
- St. Vincent College of Business and Accountancy, Pototan
- Santa Isabel College of Iloilo City, Mandurriao, Iloilo City
- Western Institute of Technology, La Paz, Iloilo City

Special Schools:

- SPED-Integrated School for Exceptional Children, Iloilo City Proper

== Sports ==
Iloilo is home to two professional sports teams. Kaya F.C.–Iloilo competes in the Philippines Football League (PFL), the highest tier of Philippine football. The club relocated to the province in 2018. Kaya has won 3 PFL titles, 3 Copa Paulino Alcantara, and 1 UFL Cup. Kaya has also competed in the AFC Champions League and the AFC Cup. The Iloilo United Royals compete in the Maharlika Pilipinas Basketball League, joining as an expansion team in the 2019–20 season.

== Media ==
Iloilo City is home to regional television stations of GMA Network (GMA TV6 & GMA News TV 28), TV5 (UHF 36 & AksyonTV 46), Solar channels (9TV TV-4) ETC UHF 32 & 2nd Avenue UHF 24), IBC (VHF 12), (BEAM UHF 26) and ABS-CBN (ABS-CBN TV10, ABS-CBN Sports+Action (UHF 38)).
