= Igbaras =

Municipality in Iloilo, Philippines

- Municipality
- Municipality of Igbaras
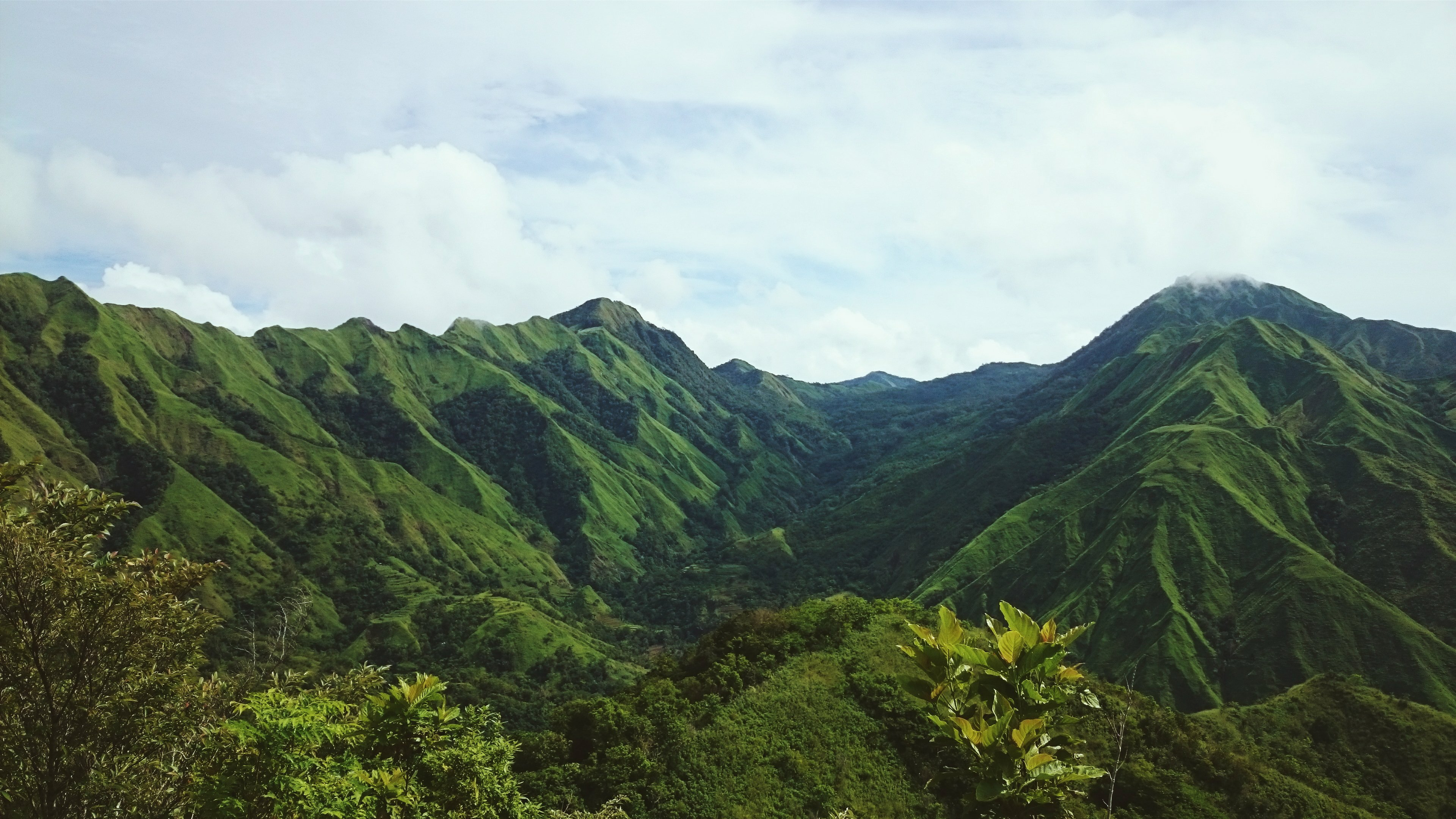
- Mount Napulak

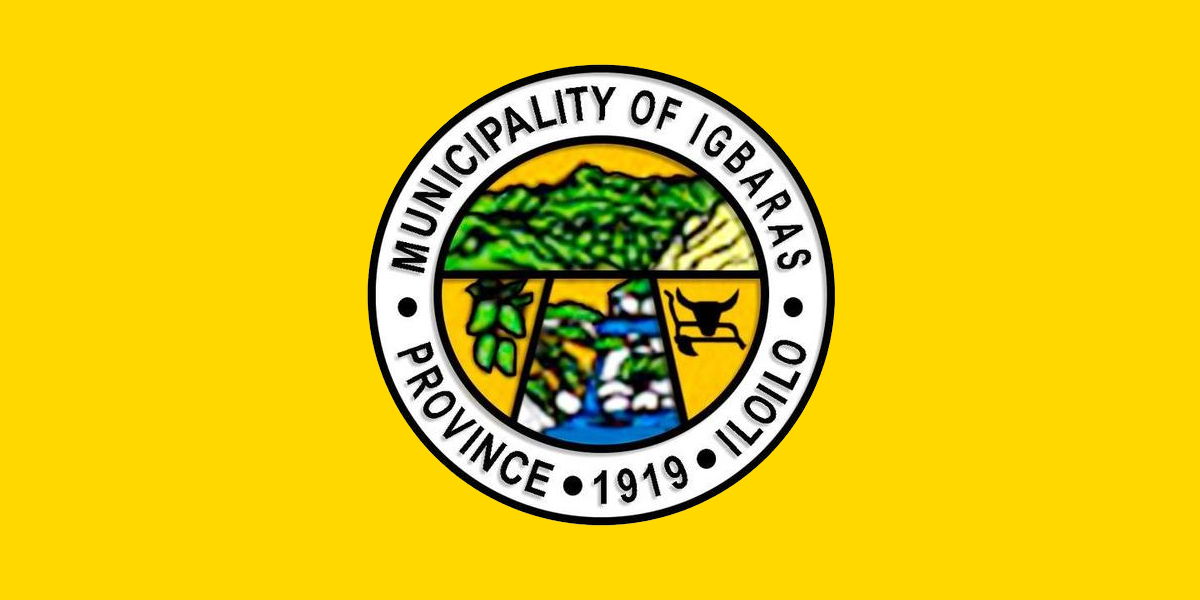
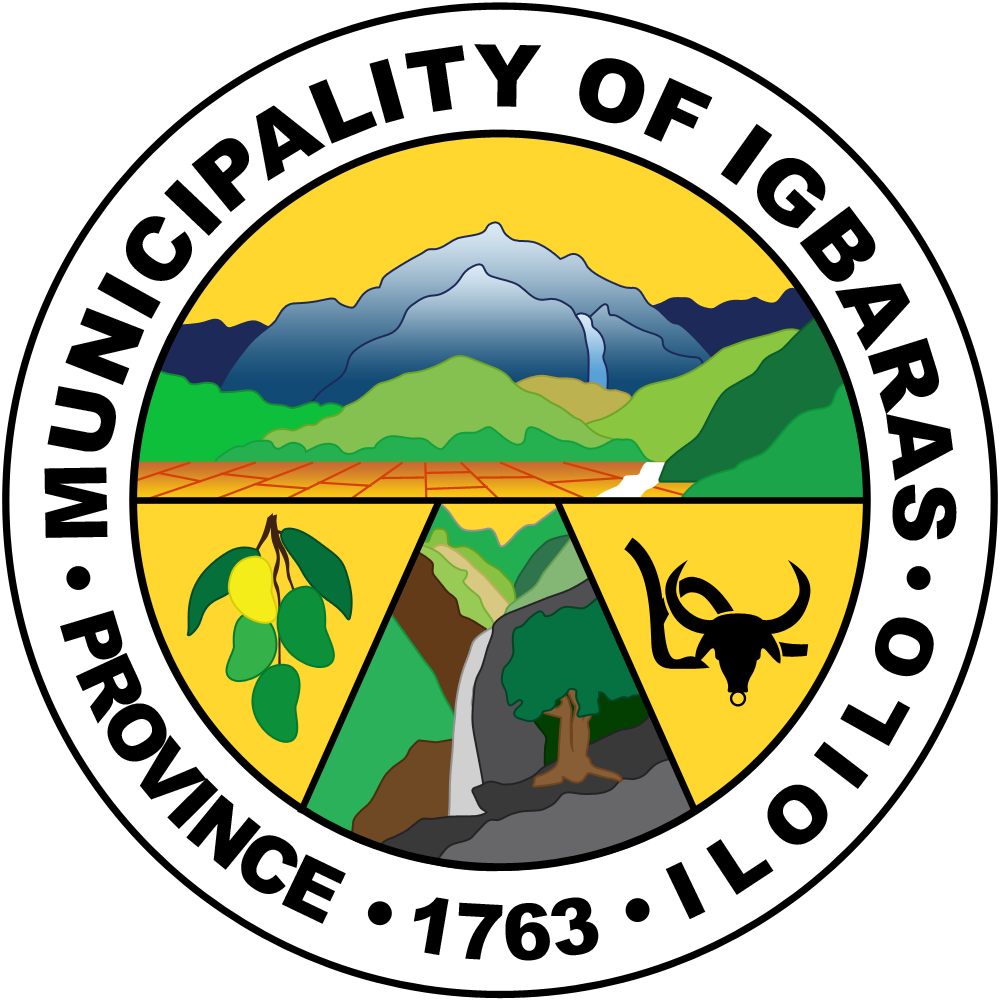
- Flag Seal

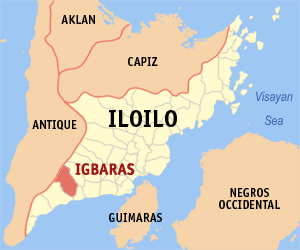
- Map of Iloilo with Igbaras highlighted
- Interactive map of Igbaras
- Location within the Philippines
- Coordinates: 10°43′N 122°16′E
- Country: Philippines
- Region: Western Visayas
- Province: Iloilo
- District: 1st district
- Founded: 1753
- Barangays: 46 (see Barangays)

Government
  - Type: Sangguniang Bayan
  - Mayor: Vicente E. Escorpion Jr. (Lakas)
  - Vice Mayor: Sherwin Paul E. Quidato (Lakas)
  - Representative: Janette L. Garin (Lakas)
  - Municipal Council: Members: Jose Vicente E. Espin, Jr. (Ind); Deniamel Yen D. Famatid (Lakas); Fatima E. Ebanen (RP); Christian Jun E. Elarmo (Ind); Anthony E. Autencio (Lakas); Ferdinand E. Esmeralda (Lakas); Romeo E. Espinosa (Ind); Hermogenes E. Eulatic (Lakas); Reynaldo E. Efondo ^{‡}; Isaac E. Evidente ^{◌}; ‡ ex officio ABC president; ◌ ex officio SK chairman
  - Electorate: 22,105 voters (2025)

Area
  - Total: 148.72 km^{2} (57.42 sq mi)
- Elevation: 111 m (364 ft)
- Highest elevation: 452 m (1,483 ft)
- Lowest elevation: 14 m (46 ft)

Population (2024 census)
  - Total: 32,442
  - Density: 218.14/km^{2} (564.98/sq mi)
  - Households: 8,021

Economy
  - Income class: 2nd municipal income class
  - Poverty incidence: 17.9% (2023)
  - Revenue: ₱ 174.1 million (2024)
  - Assets: ₱ 1,005 million (2024)
  - Expenditure: ₱ 139.7 million (2024)
  - Liabilities: ₱ 153.6 million (2024)

Service provider
  - Electricity: Iloilo 1 Electric Cooperative (ILECO 1)
- Time zone: UTC+8 (PST)
- ZIP code: 5029
- PSGC: 063021000
- IDD : area code: +63 (0)33
- Native languages: Karay-a; Hiligaynon; Tagalog
- Website: www.igbaras.gov.ph

Igbaras, officially the Municipality of Igbaras (Kinaray-a: Banwa kang Igbaras; Hiligaynon: Banwa sang Igbaras, Tagalog: Bayan ng Igbaras), is a municipality in the province of Iloilo, Philippines. According to the 2024 census, it has a population of 32,442 people.

Igbaras celebrates its town fiesta annually on May 22 in honor of Santa Rita de Cascia. The town has many points of interest including the ruins of the church belfry, Mount Napulak, Bahi-Bahi, Nadsadjan Falls, Lagsakan Falls, Timapok Falls, Guiritsan Falls, Sampanan Falls, Bat Cave, Igcabugao Cave, Bais Cave and the Pakuyang sa Tangyan Festival. A species of Rafflesia, the world's largest flower, can also be found here.

== Etymology ==
The name Igbaras comes from a combination of two words, "ig" or "tig" which means "plenty of" or "season of", and "baras" which means "sand". Thus Igbaras means "plenty of sand" which alludes to the nearby sandy river. Igbaras is most commonly mistaken with the similar-sounding and more widely known province of Guimaras.

== History ==
As a result of the implementation of Spanish Governor-General Narciso Claveria's decree on giving Filipinos with Spanish surnames in 1849, inhabitants of Igbaras during that time were apportioned with surnames starting mostly with the letter E.

Igbaras was fused with Guimbal in 1902 until the American regime made it a separate town on January 1, 1919. Don Flor Evidente became the first municipal mayor.

American soldiers water tortured Igbaras leaders then burned the village to the ground during the Philippine–American War

Igbaras has the distinction of having the first congressman elected to Congress in 1925–1928 in the person of Don Eugenio Ealdama, and the delegate to the 1935 Constitutional Convention, Don Mariano Ezpeleta who later served as Consul-General and ambassador to several countries.

== Geography ==
Igbaras is located at the south-western part of Iloilo. It is situated between the coordinates of 122.2650’ longitude, and 10.7167’ latitude. It is 40 kilometres (25 mi) from Iloilo City.

=== Barangays ===
Igbaras is politically subdivided into 46 barangays. Each barangay consists of puroks and some have sitios.

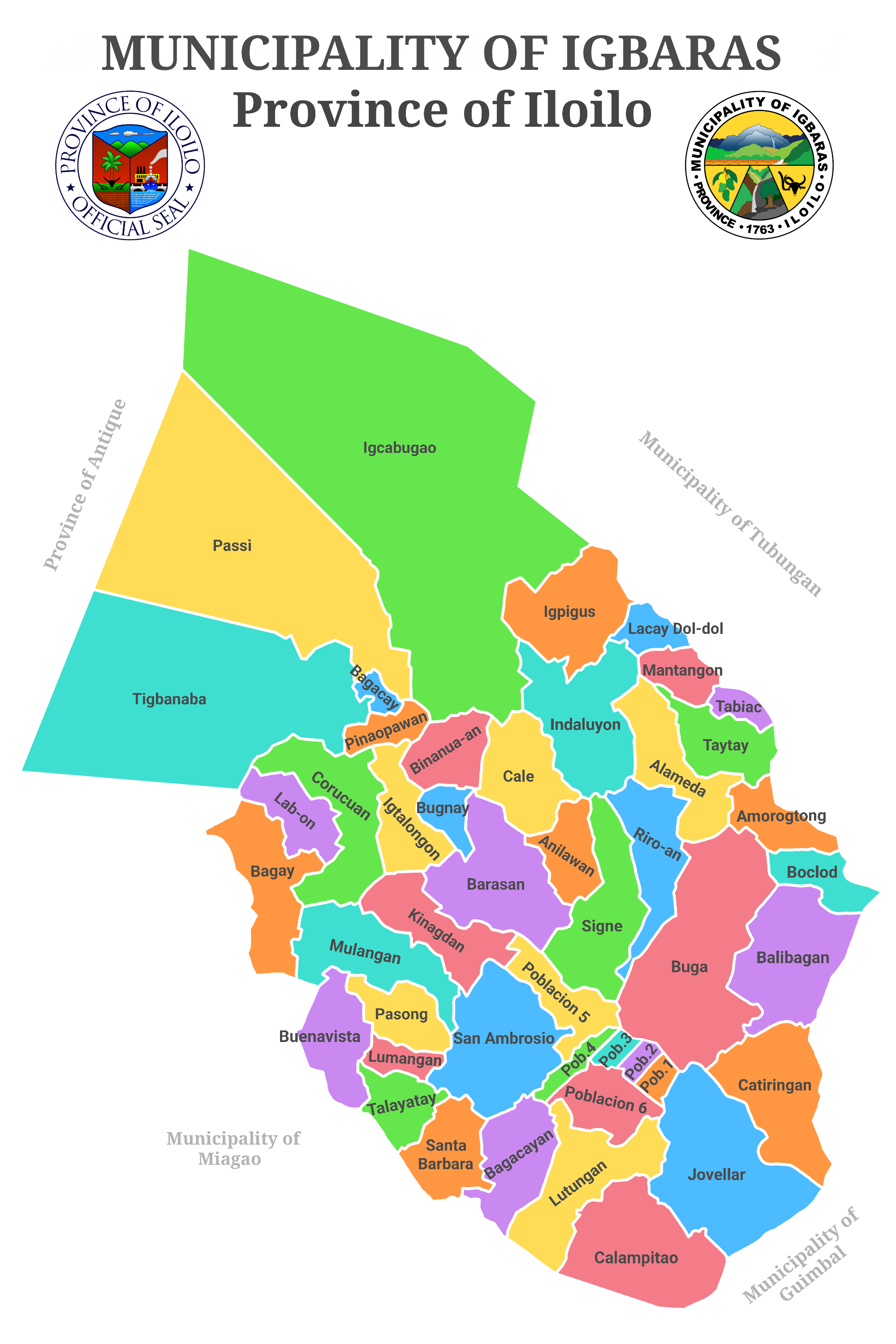
Map of the barangays of the Municipality of Igbaras in Iloilo, Philippines.

Alameda was formerly known as Bukaw.

- Alameda
- Amorogtong
- Anilawan
- Bagacay
- Bagacayan
- Bagay
- Balibagan
- Barasan
- Binanua-an
- Boclod
- Buenavista
- Buga
- Bugnay
- Calampitao
- Cale
- Catiringan
- Corucuan
- Igcabugao
- Igpigus
- Igtalongon
- Indaluyon
- Jovellar
- Kinagdan
- Lab-on
- Lacay Dol-Dol
- Lumangan
- Lutungan
- Mantangon
- Mulangan
- Pasong
- Passi
- Pinaopawan
- Barangay 1 Poblacion
- Barangay 2 Poblacion
- Barangay 3 Poblacion
- Barangay 4 Poblacion
- Barangay 5 Poblacion
- Barangay 6 Poblacion
- Riro-an
- San Ambrosio
- Santa Barbara
- Signe
- Tabiac
- Talayatay
- Taytay
- Tigbanaba

=== Climate ===
Climate data for Igbaras, Iloilo
Month	Jan	Feb	Mar	Apr	May	Jun	Jul	Aug	Sep	Oct	Nov	Dec	Year
Mean daily maximum °C (°F)	30 (86)	31 (88)	32 (90)	33 (91)	32 (90)	30 (86)	29 (84)	29 (84)	29 (84)	29 (84)	30 (86)	30 (86)	30 (87)
Mean daily minimum °C (°F)	21 (70)	21 (70)	22 (72)	23 (73)	25 (77)	25 (77)	25 (77)	24 (75)	24 (75)	24 (75)	23 (73)	22 (72)	23 (74)
Average precipitation mm (inches)	19 (0.7)	17 (0.7)	26 (1.0)	37 (1.5)	119 (4.7)	191 (7.5)	258 (10.2)	260 (10.2)	248 (9.8)	196 (7.7)	97 (3.8)	39 (1.5)	1,507 (59.3)
Average rainy days	7.2	5.2	8.3	11.9	22.3	26.5	28.3	28.2	27.3	26.4	18.7	11.8	222.1
Source: Meteoblue

== Demographics ==
Population census of Igbaras
Year	Pop.	±% p.a.
1903	6,406	—
1939	14,394	+2.27%
1948	15,968	+1.16%
1960	17,537	+0.78%
1970	19,720	+1.18%
1975	21,339	+1.59%
1980	22,173	+0.77%
1990	25,274	+1.32%
1995	25,960	+0.50%
2000	27,878	+1.54%
2007	29,417	+0.74%
2010	31,347	+2.34%
2015	32,004	+0.40%
2020	32,197	+0.13%
2024	32,442	+0.18%
Source: Philippine Statistics Authority

In the 2024 census, the population of Igbaras was 32,442 people, with a density of 220 inhabitants per square kilometre or 570 inhabitants per square mile.

=== Language ===
People from Igbaras speak Kinaray-a, a language associated with Antique. However, Hiligaynon, a vernacular commonly used in Iloilo City is understood by everyone and used mostly by students or those staying in the city.

== Economy ==
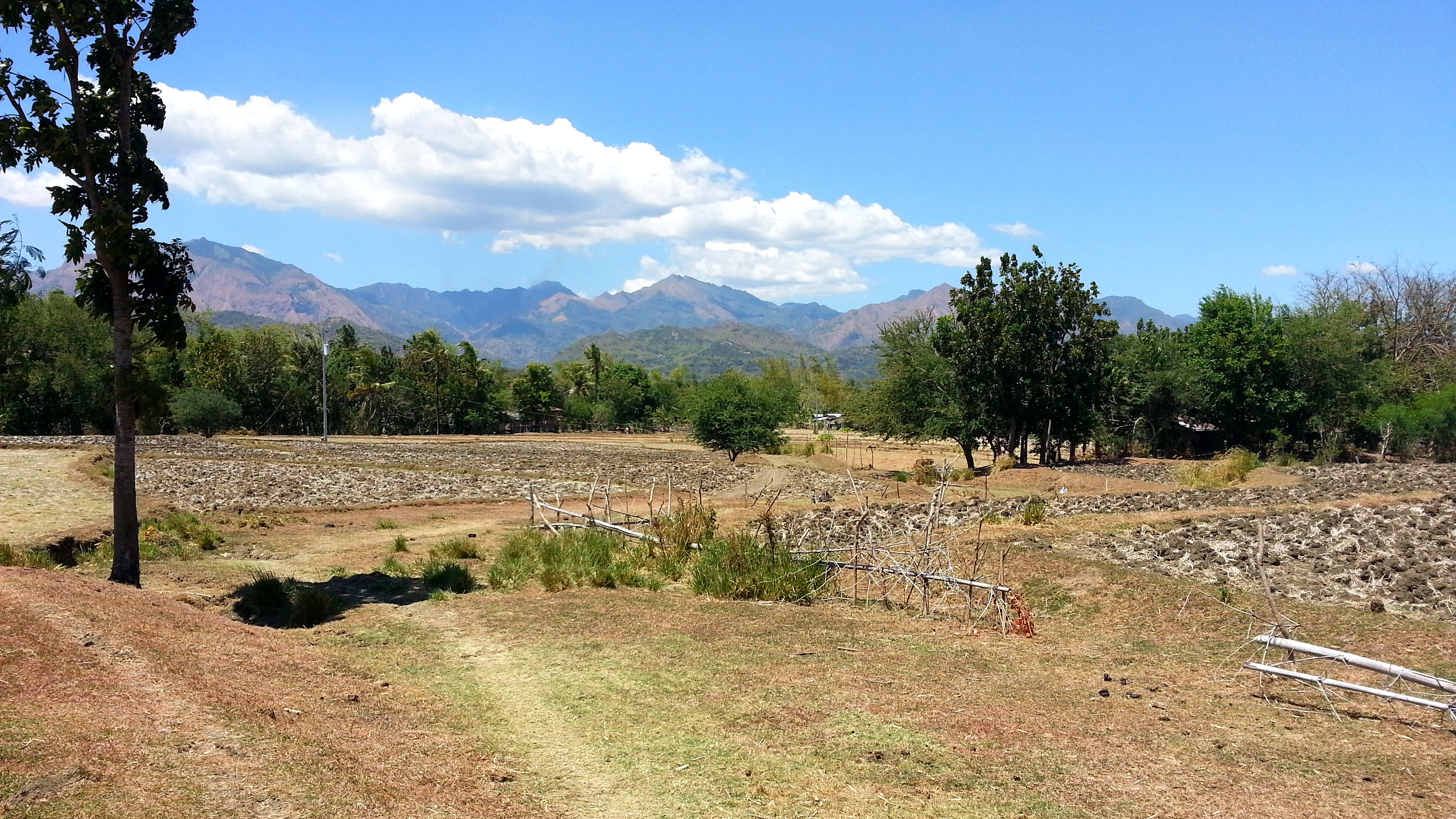
Unused fields in Igbaras

Poverty incidence of Igbaras (%)

Source: Philippine Statistics Authority

== Education ==
The Igbaras Schools District Office governs all educational institutions within the municipality. It oversees the management and operations of all private and public, from primary to secondary schools.

Primary and elementary schools

- Amorogtong Elementary School
- Bagay Elementary School
- Balibagan Primary School
- Barasan Elementary School
- Buga Elementary School
- Calampitao Elementary School
- Cale-Indaluyon Elementary School
- Catiringan Primary School
- Igbaras Central Elementary School
- Igcabugao Elementary School
- Igpigus Elementary School
- Igtalongon Elementary School
- Jovellar Elementary School
- Lumangan Elementary School
- Lutungan Primary School
- Mulangan Elementary School
- Santa Barbara Elementary School
- Tabiac Elementary School
- Tano-ong Primary School
- Tigbanaba Elementary School

Secondary schools

- Alameda National High School
- Igbaras National High School
- Igtalongon National High School

== Government ==
The mayor is the chief executive of the town. He is elected to serve a three-year term, with a maximum of three terms. The incumbent Municipal Mayor is Atty. Vicente E. Escorpion Jr. The Vice Mayor is the Presiding Officer of the Sangguniang Bayan. He is also the chief executive of the town whenever the mayor is out of the town. He is elected to serve a three-year term, with a maximum of three terms. The incumbent vice mayor is Atty. Sherwin Paul E. Quidato. The Sangguniang Bayan of Igbaras is composed of 8 members with 2 ex-officio members which are the town's Liga ng mga Barangay President and Sangguniang Kabataan Federation President. The municipal councilors are elected to serve a three-year term, with a maximum of three terms.

=== Elected officials ===
The town officials from July 1, 2025 to June 30, 2028. They were elected last May 12, 2025 Philippine General Elections.

Position	Name
Municipal Mayor	Vicente Elmido Escorpion Jr.
Municipal Vice Mayor	Sherwin Paul Eugalca Quidato
Councilors	Jose Vicente Elechicon Espin Jr.
Councilors	Deniamel Yen Dela Cruz-Famatid
Councilors	Fatima Estrañero Ebanen
Councilors	Christian Jun Encia Elarmo
Councilors	Anthony Estil Autencio
Councilors	Ferdinand Espia Esmejarda
Councilors	Romeo Eresuelo Espinosa
Councilors	Hermogenes Edjan Eulatic
Councilors	Reynaldo Espiritu Efondo (LNB Rep.)
Councilors	Isaac Eucare Evidente (Sk Fed. Pres.)

=== List of former chief executive ===
- Don Flor Evidente (1919–1922)
- Lucas Gentica (1922–1925)
- Julian Bucoy Saavedra (1925–1931)
- Justo Estrella (1931–1938)
- Gerardo Escala (1938–1941)
- Toribio Melliza (1941–1945, 1961–1964)
- Perfecto Saavedra (1945–1955)
- Ricardo Ealdama (1955–1961)
- Atty. Daniel Esmeralda (1964–1977)
- Vicente E. Perez (1977–1985)
- Wilfredo C. Uy (1986–1992)
- Fruto J. Saavedra (1992–2001)
- Jaime Esmeralda, MD (2001–2010)
- Atty. Vicente E. Escorpion Jr. (2010–2019)
- Jaime Esmeralda, MD (2019–2022)
- Atty. Vicente E. Escorpion Jr. (2022–Present)
