= Tubungan =

Municipality in Iloilo, Philippines

- Municipality
- Municipality of Tubungan
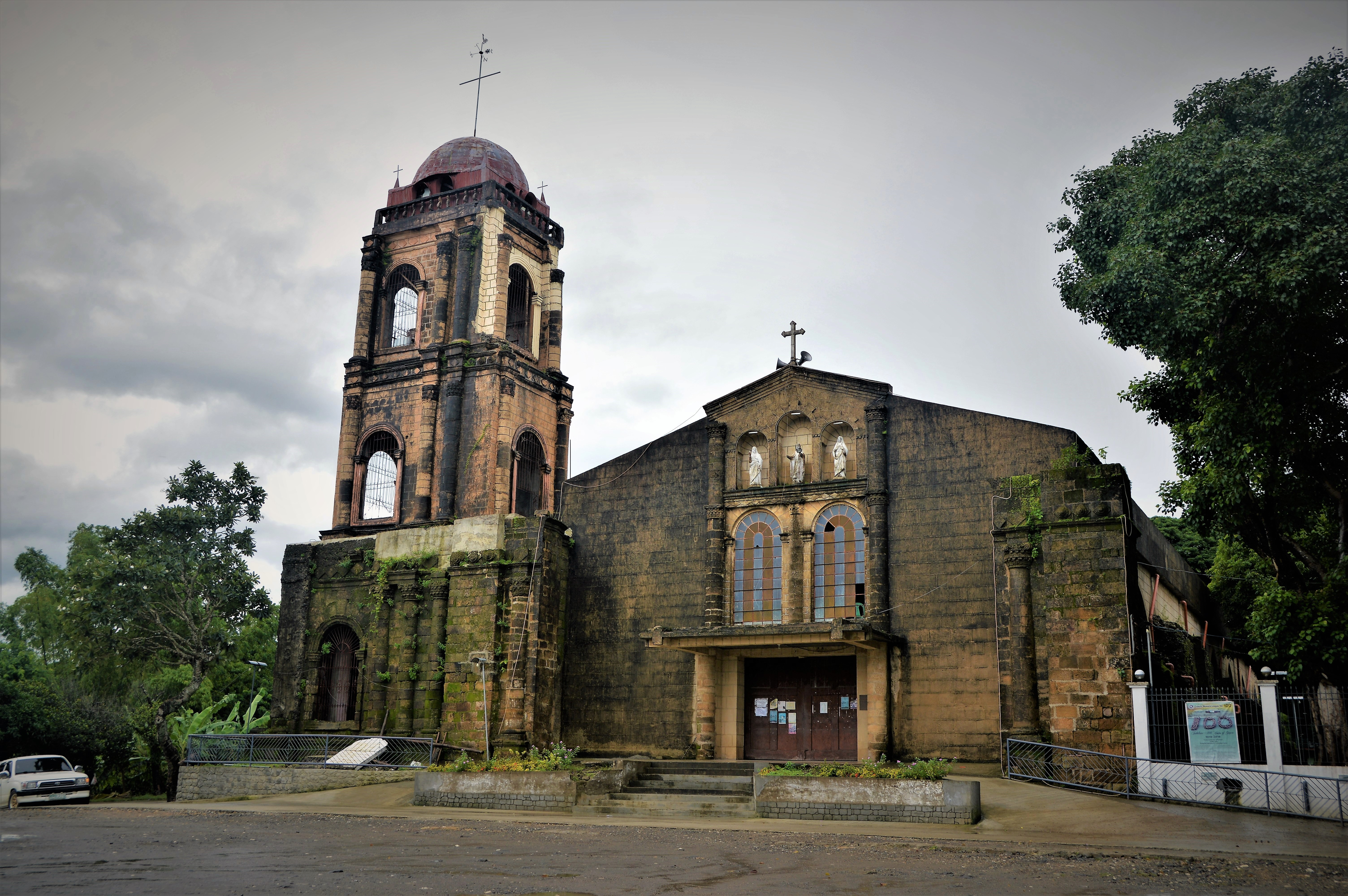
- Church of Tubungan

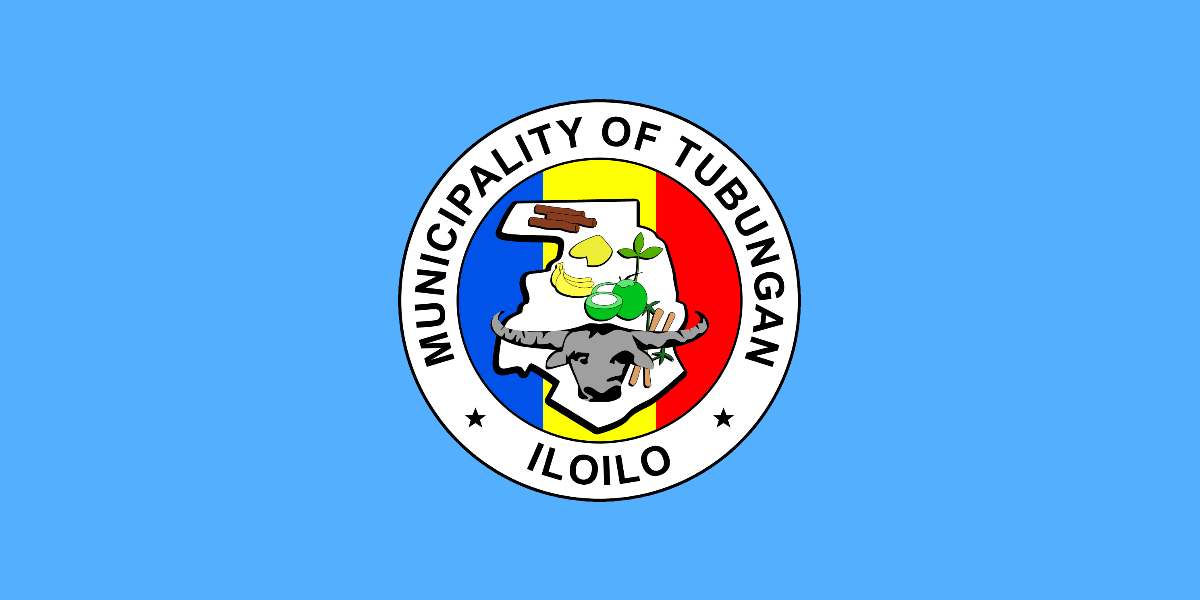
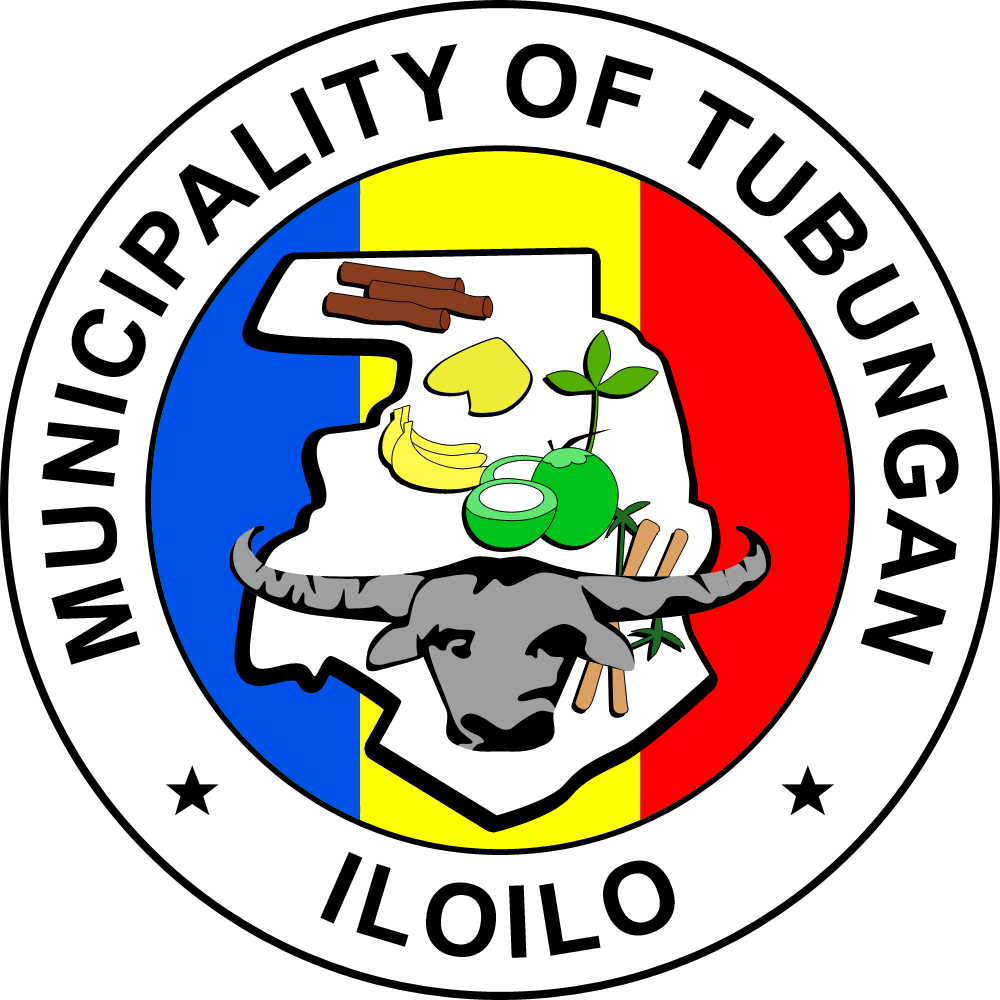
- Flag Seal

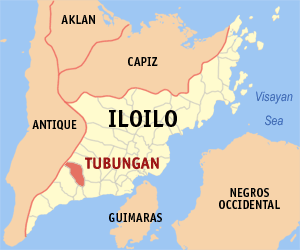
- Map of Iloilo with Tubungan highlighted
- Interactive map of Tubungan
- Location within the Philippines
- Coordinates: 10°47′N 122°18′E
- Country: Philippines
- Region: Western Visayas
- Province: Iloilo
- District: 1st district
- Founded: 1768 (Barrio)
- Established: 1803 (Municipio)
- Chartered: May 1, 1938 (EO 143)
- Barangays: 48 (see Barangays)

Government
  - Type: Sangguniang Bayan
  - Mayor: Roquito G. Tacsagon (Lakas)
  - Vice Mayor: Leo Cezar T. Taypen (Lakas)
  - Representative: Janette L. Garin (Lakas)
  - Municipal Council: Members: Vicente T. Gargaritano, Jr. (PFP); Mark Joshua T. Tacsagon (Lakas); Francisco T. Tacadao (Lakas); Fretz Anthony T. Talento (Lakas); Graciano T. Talledo (Ind); Armando T. Tacuyan (Lakas); Francisco G. Gallego, Jr. (Lakas); Lorenzo T. Tanallon, Sr. (Ind); Melania T. Tacsagon ^{‡}; Jennifer T. Buenavides ^{◌}; ‡ ex officio ABC president; ◌ ex officio SK chairman
  - Electorate: 15,170 voters (2025)

Area
  - Total: 85.18 km^{2} (32.89 sq mi)
- Elevation: 160 m (520 ft)
- Highest elevation: 534 m (1,752 ft)
- Lowest elevation: 42 m (138 ft)

Population (2024 census)
  - Total: 23,083
  - Density: 271.0/km^{2} (701.9/sq mi)
  - Households: 5,414

Economy
  - Income class: 4th municipal income class
  - Poverty incidence: 19.51% (2023)
  - Revenue: ₱ 173.4 million (2024)
  - Assets: ₱ 601.9 million (2024)
  - Expenditure: ₱ 45.14 million (2024)
  - Liabilities: ₱ 118.1 million (2024)

Service provider
  - Electricity: Iloilo 1 Electric Cooperative (ILECO 1)
- Time zone: UTC+8 (PST)
- ZIP code: 5027
- PSGC: 063046000
- IDD : area code: +63 (0)33
- Native languages: Karay-a; Hiligaynon; Tagalog
- Website: www.tubungan.gov.ph

Tubungan, officially the Municipality of Tubungan (Kinaray-a: Banwa kang Tubungan; Hiligaynon: Banwa sang Tubungan; Tagalog: Bayan ng Tubungan), is a municipality in the province of Iloilo, Philippines. According to the 2024 census, it has a population of 23,083 people.

== Geography ==
Tubungan is 41 kilometres (25 mi) from Iloilo City. With a land area of 8,518 hectares (21,050 acres) found a hundred feet above sea level, the municipality's topography is dominated mostly by gentle rolling hills and idyllic mountains. The slope gradient ranges to as high as 25 per cent in most areas giving it an almost mountainous terrain.

=== Barangays ===
Tubungan is politically subdivided into 48 barangays. Each barangay consists of puroks and some have sitios.

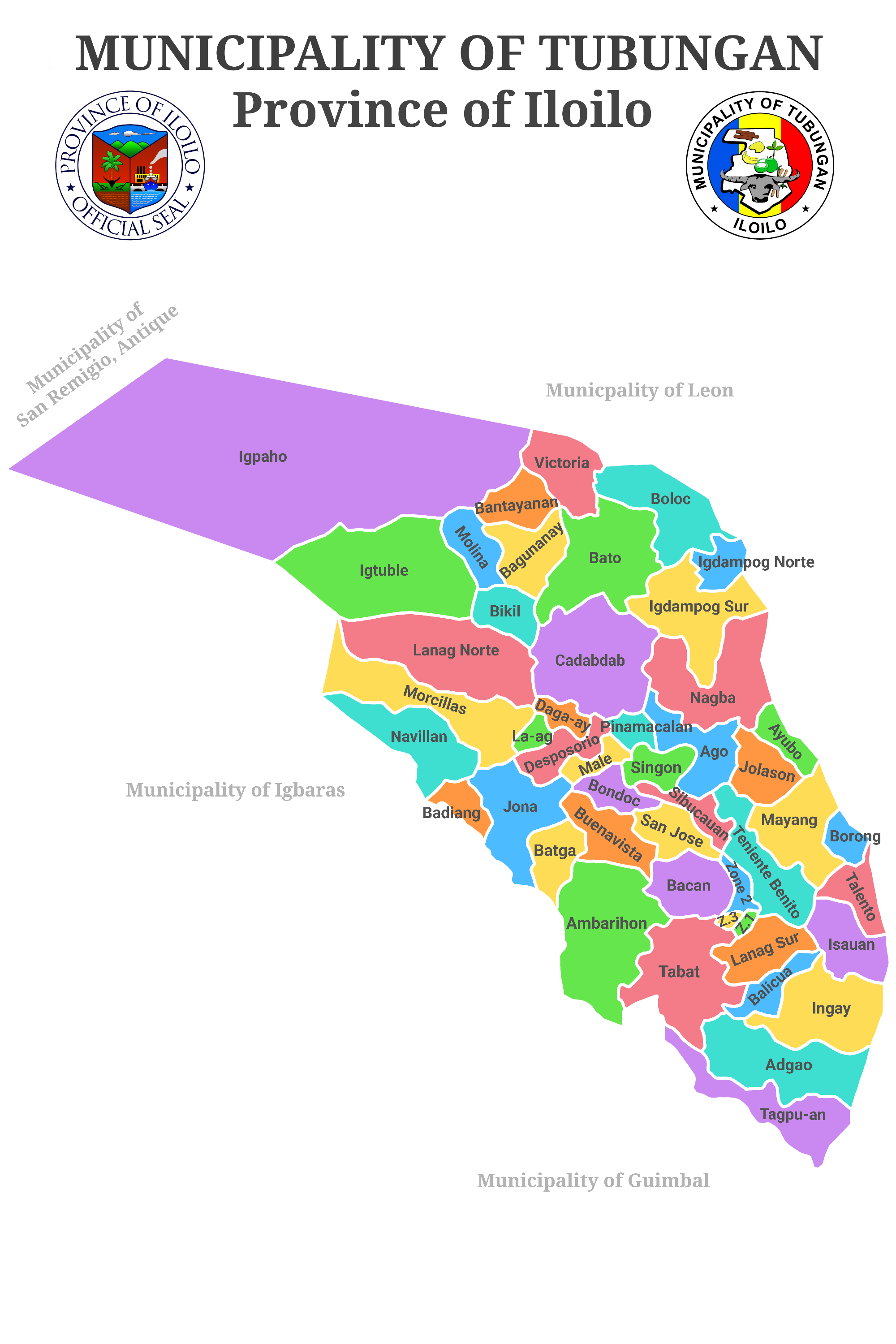
This map shows the barangays of the municipality of Tubungan in Iloilo province, Philippines.

Barangay	Population 2020	Area in hectares	Distance from Poblacion in km
Adgao	1,177	263.5533	3.75
Ago	231	134.6556	4
Ambarihon	273	362.4647	6
Ayubo	319	10.7356	4.50
Bacan	433	144.6238	4.50
Badiang	298	64. 2792	7
Bagunanay	193	141.2059	9
Balicua	345	69.0866	2
Bantayanan	386	75.2724	10
Batga	272	83.5902	7.50
Bato	447	282.0997	9
Bikil	324	149.7564	7.50
Boloc	577	225.7735	10
Bondoc/Sto. Niño	233	75. 3194	4
Borong	149	48.7467	5
Buenavista	360	120.1394	5
Cadabdab	1,112	340.4416	7
Daga-ay	280	38. 6136	6
Desposorio	233	78.9817	5.50
Igdampog Norte	175	70. 8441	8
Igdampog Sur	384	277.7922	7
Igpaho	775	1,563.2170	18
Igtuble	1,313	121.1785	11
Ingay	693	213.4378	3
Isauan	225	140.6981	3
Jolason	667	160.5097	4
Jona	473	223.7646	6.50
Laag/San Vicente	165	28.7530	6
Lanag Norte	701	293.4966	6.25
Lanag Sur	565	110.7174	1
Male	268	53.3632	5
Mayang	841	245.3520	1.75
Molina	449	346.1199	11
Morcillas	516	318.2281	7.50
Nagba	531	288.9616	7.50
Navillan	580	201.5377	9.50
Pinamacalan	223	52.8525	6
San Jose	344	91.2392	2.50
Sibucauan	483	61.2110	2.0
Singon	569	71.8367	3
Tabat	555	272.9474	4.50
Tagpu-an	848	208.7732	4.50
Talento	315	77.2322	4
Teniente Benito	1,081	181.8797	0.30
Victoria	449	163.4862	12
Zone I Pob.	406	10.0108	n/a
Zone II Pob.	424	12.6017	n/a
Zone III Pob.	361	10.5951	n/a

=== Climate ===
Climate data for Tubungan, Iloilo
Month	Jan	Feb	Mar	Apr	May	Jun	Jul	Aug	Sep	Oct	Nov	Dec	Year
Mean daily maximum °C (°F)	31 (88)	32 (90)	33 (91)	34 (93)	34 (93)	32 (90)	31 (88)	31 (88)	31 (88)	31 (88)	32 (90)	31 (88)	32 (90)
Mean daily minimum °C (°F)	21 (70)	21 (70)	22 (72)	23 (73)	23 (73)	23 (73)	23 (73)	23 (73)	23 (73)	22 (72)	22 (72)	22 (72)	22 (72)
Average precipitation mm (inches)	81 (3.2)	77 (3.0)	83 (3.3)	87 (3.4)	233 (9.2)	352 (13.9)	463 (18.2)	398 (15.7)	394 (15.5)	317 (12.5)	160 (6.3)	137 (5.4)	2,782 (109.6)
Average rainy days	16.5	13.2	16.2	19.8	28.3	29.8	30.6	30.5	29.5	29.9	24.3	21.1	289.7
Source: meteoblue.com

== Demographics ==
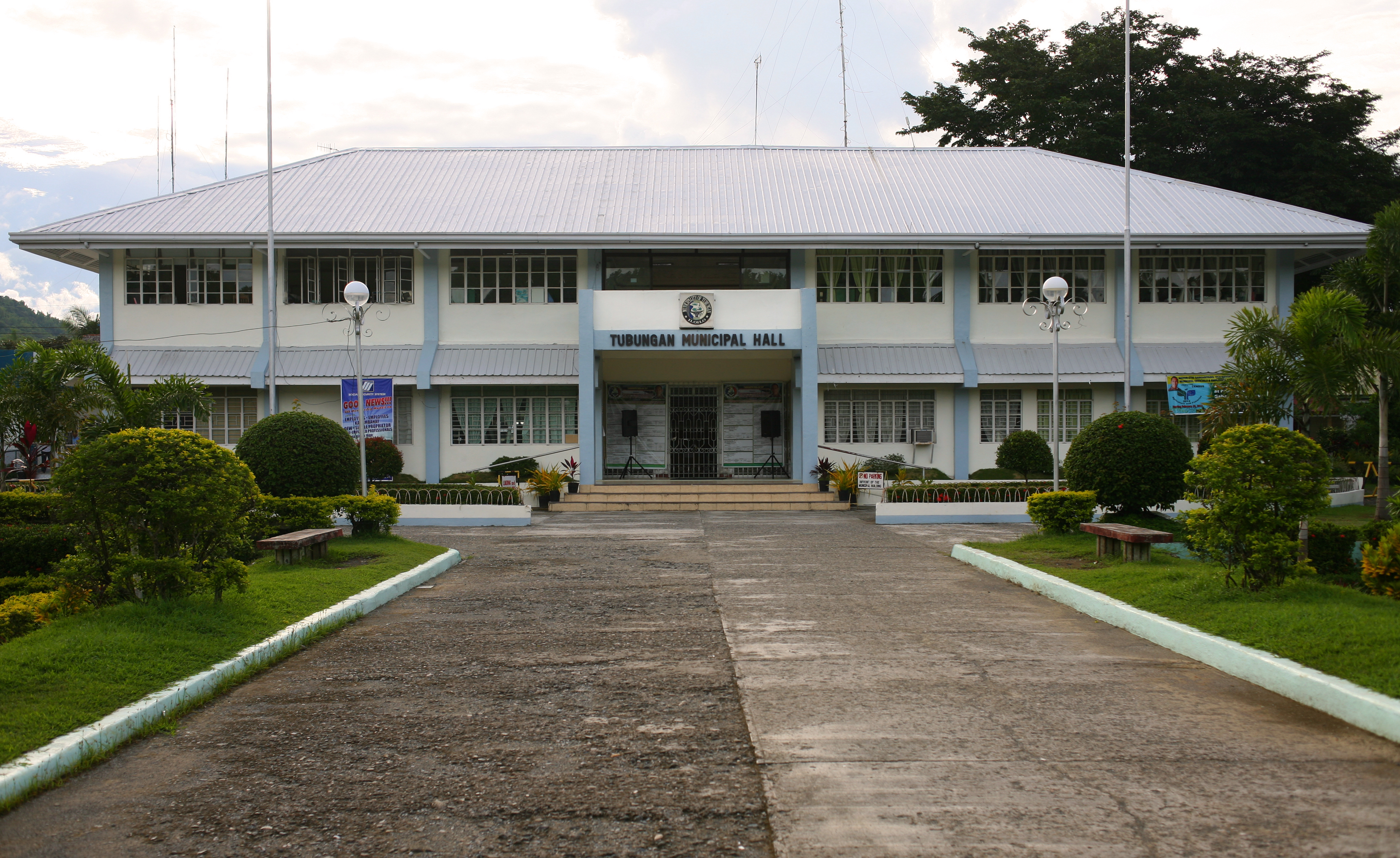
Tubungan Municipal Hall

Population census of Tubungan
Year	Pop.	±% p.a.
1903	3,798	—
1939	9,821	+2.67%
1948	10,464	+0.71%
1960	11,863	+1.05%
1970	12,440	+0.48%
1975	14,069	+2.50%
1980	14,510	+0.62%
1990	15,936	+0.94%
1995	18,450	+2.78%
2000	19,007	+0.64%
2007	20,631	+1.14%
2010	21,540	+1.58%
2015	22,449	+0.79%
2020	23,021	+0.53%
2024	23,083	+0.06%
Source: Philippine Statistics Authority

In the 2024 census, the population of Tubungan was 23,083 people, with a density of 270 inhabitants per square kilometre or 700 inhabitants per square mile.

== Economy ==
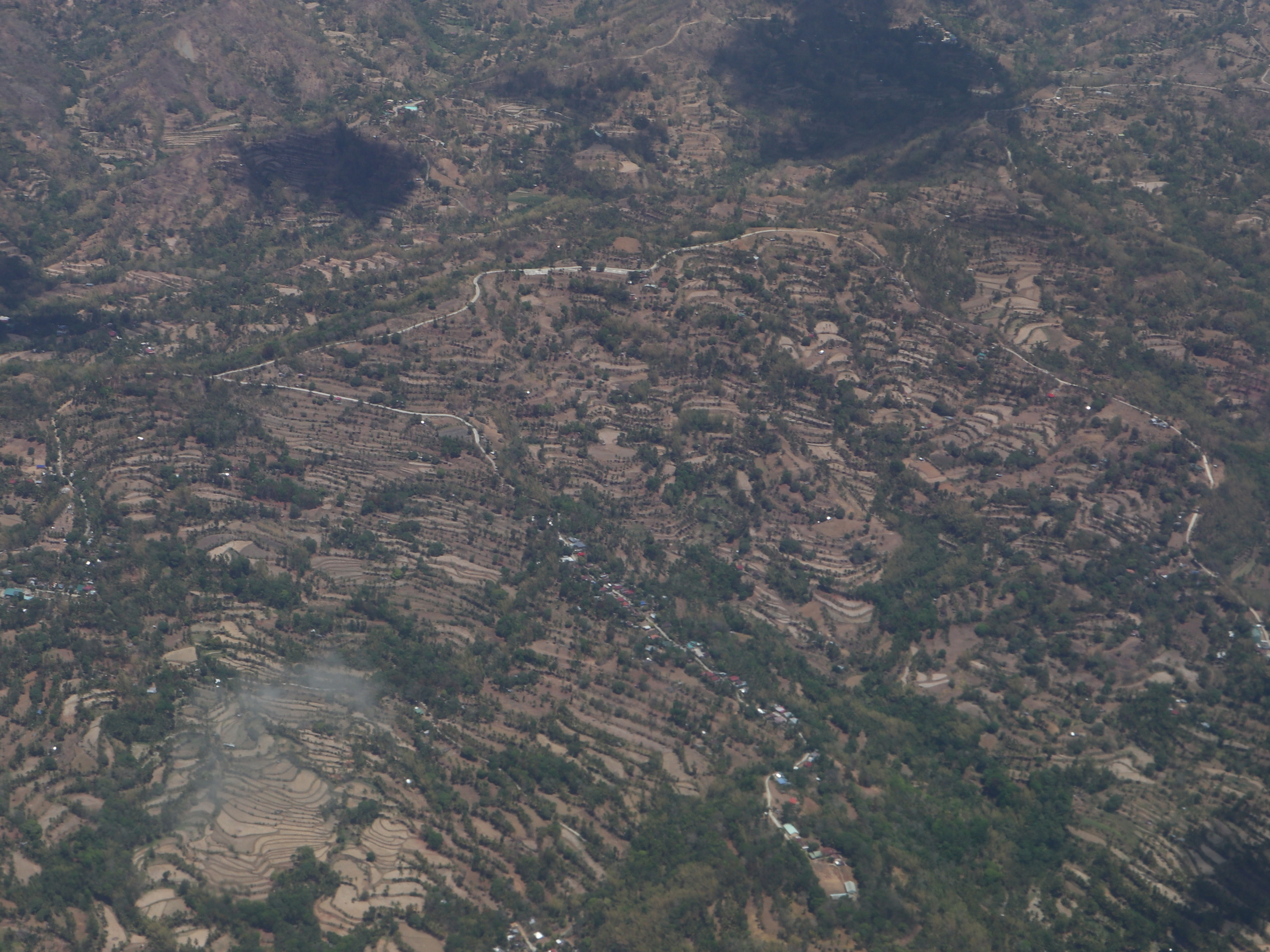
Tubungan Rice Terraces aerial view

Poverty incidence of Tubungan (%)

Source: Philippine Statistics Authority

== Government ==
=== Social welfare services ===
Tubungan embarks on several social development programs to better the lives of its people. At present, there are 26 Day Care Service Programs that serve close to a thousand-day care pre-schoolers. To provide for the needs of malnourished young children ages 0–5 years old, the supplemental feeding program in 13 barangays at the moment is aiming to restore the health 391 toddlers suffering from 2nd degree of malnourishment.

== Infrastructure ==
=== Water Supply ===
Municipal water supplies are sourced from deep wells, jetmatic pump wells, rivers, and mountain springs. In some areas with insufficient water supply, several families share water from a communal deep well. However, despite its being land locked, residents of Tubungan still are adequately supplied with clean potable water for their household and agricultural needs.

In some barangays, a large percentage of their Internal Revenue Allotment (IRA), sometimes as high as 20 per cent, is allotted for the expansion of their water supply system. Nevertheless, these projects are limited only to residents living within the barangay centers.

With a daily combined water consumption of roughly 1.6 million liters, the municipality's existing water sources will be sufficient for the entire population ten years from the present. Moreover, the local government unit eyes to tap other potential water sources to provide more water as answer to the growing population demand and increasing economic growth.

=== Power ===
In year 2000, Iloilo Electric Company (ILECO) I reported that almost half of the total household in the municipality have electrical installations. This covers 27 barangays; in addition, 7 barangays already have electrical connections but still unenergized. The remaining of the residents makes use of kerosene, battery cells, and generators for their power sources. These, however, are located in far-flung barangays not yet reached by ILECO I.

Nonetheless, a plan to energize the entire municipality is already on its way since it is the priority program of the National Government as endorsed by the Local Government Unit of Tubungan.

=== Education ===
As of 2000, a substantial number of Tubungan's young populations are enrolled in both primary and intermediate levels reaching to as high as 3000.

The municipality has 12 complete elementary schools and one national high school. Tubungan National High School serves not only Tubungan residents, but also secondary school students from the nearby towns of Igbaras, Tigbauan, and Leon. Almost all public elementary schools, as well as two existing private kindergartens, provide pre-elementary education.

Tubungan requires additional class rooms and personnel to provide for the needs of its ever-increasing student population. In addition to this, a proposal for the institution of another secondary school to be located in Barangay Lanag Norte is already underway to serve the students living in far-flung barangays.
