= Tigbauan =

Municipality in Iloilo, Philippines

- Municipality
- Municipality of Tigbauan
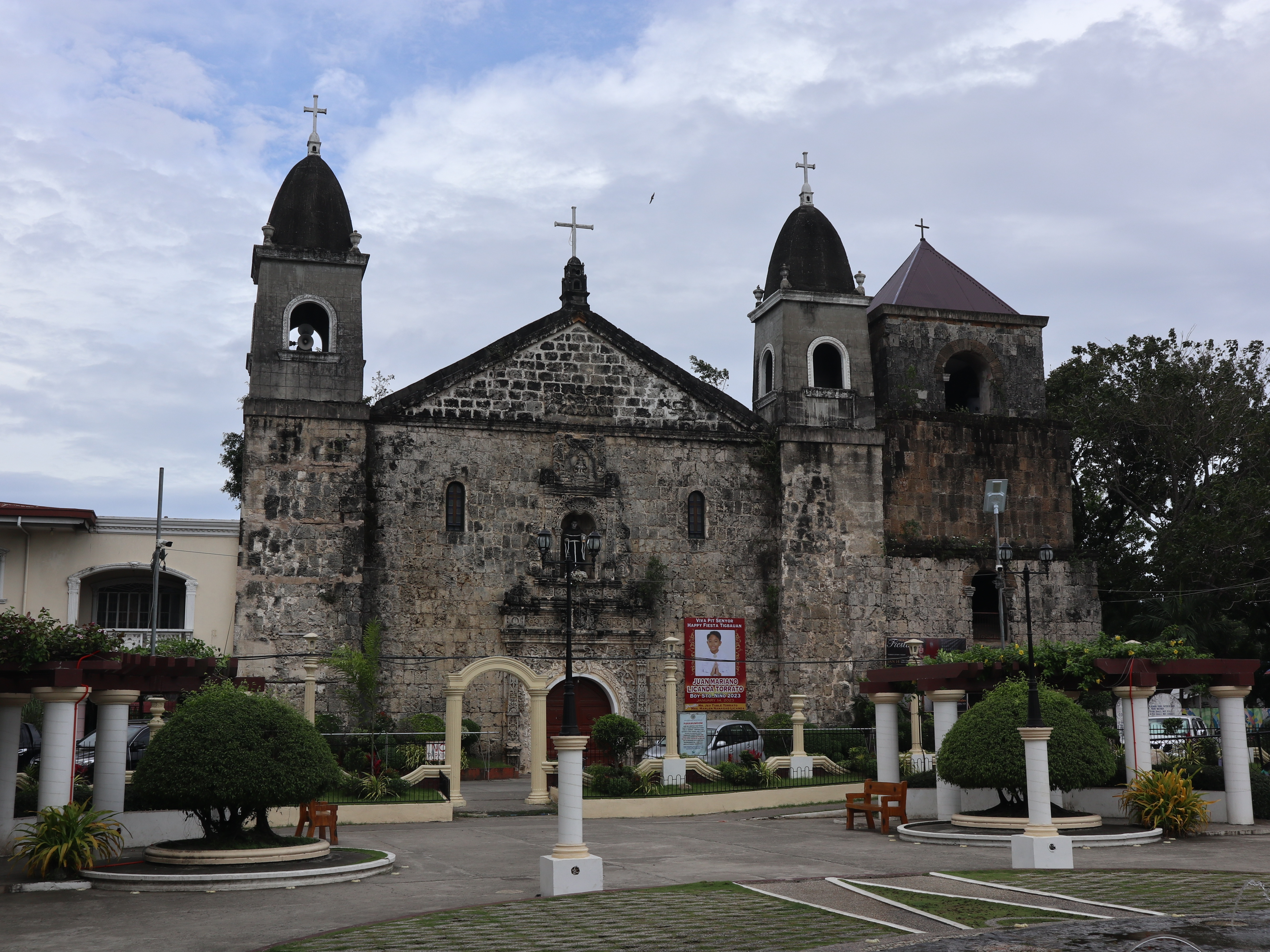
- Tigbauan Church

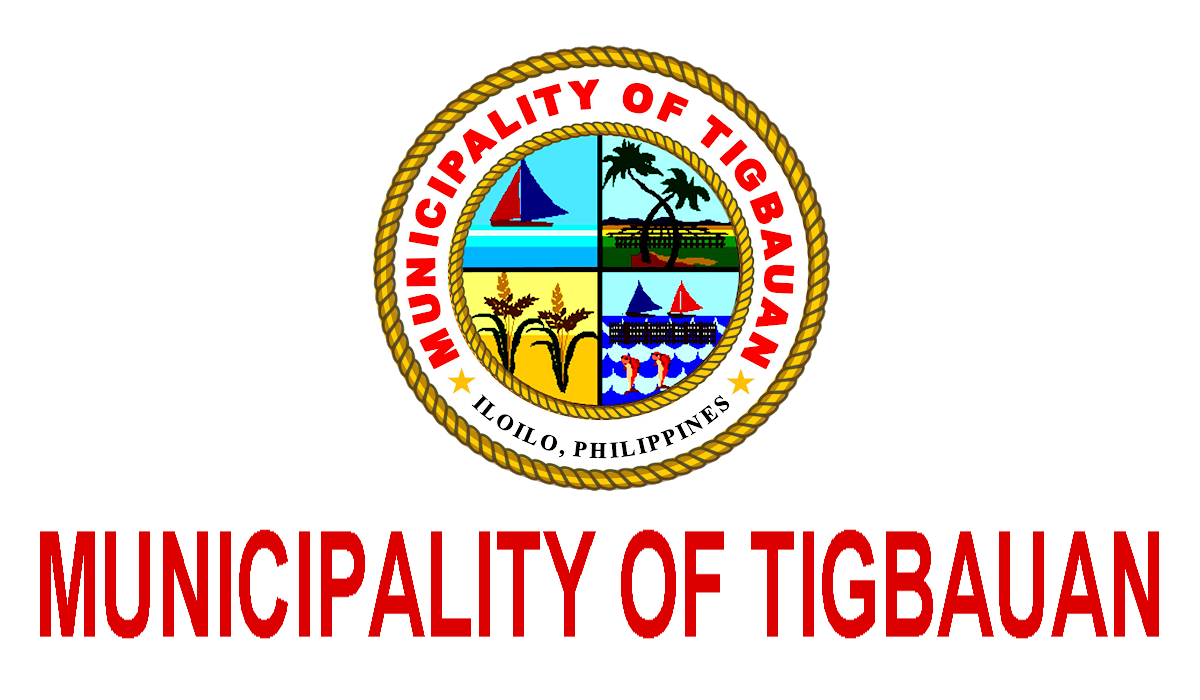
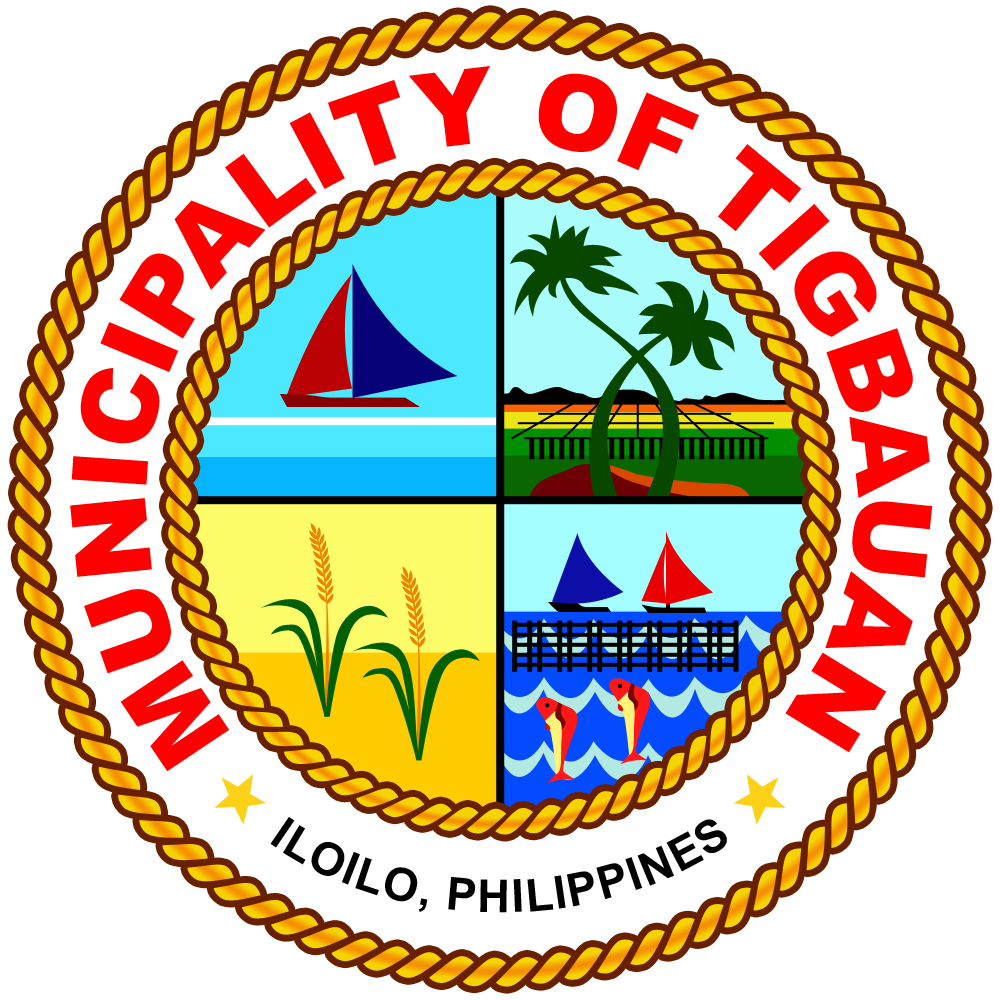
- Flag Seal

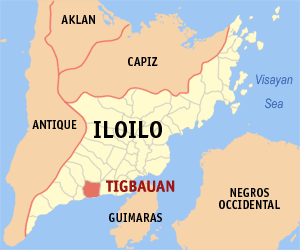
- Map of Iloilo with Tigbauan highlighted
- Interactive map of Tigbauan
- Location within the Philippines
- Coordinates: 10°40′29″N 122°22′39″E
- Country: Philippines
- Region: Western Visayas
- Province: Iloilo
- District: 1st district
- Barangays: 52 (see Barangays)

Government
  - Type: Sangguniang Bayan
  - Mayor: Virgilio T. Teruel (Lakas)
  - Vice Mayor: Lugen T. Ortilano (Lakas)
  - Representative: Janette L. Garin (Lakas)
  - Municipal Council: Members: Pinky A. Jarina (Ind); Gene Rose C. Canaya (Ind); Adrian S. Camposagrado (Lakas); Joel L. Sayson (Lakas); Marlon R. Teruñez (Lakas); Nora Rose T. Tubiano (Lakas); Reynaldo E. Tumabotabo (Lakas); Noberto T. Turalba (Lakas); Lorna T. Domingo ^{‡}; Florence Joy V. Cabalonga ^{◌}; ‡ ex officio ABC president; ◌ ex officio SK chairman
  - Electorate: 41,879 voters (2025)

Area
  - Total: 83.68 km^{2} (32.31 sq mi)
- Elevation: 72 m (236 ft)
- Highest elevation: 1,275 m (4,183 ft)
- Lowest elevation: 0 m (0 ft)

Population (2020)
  - Total: 65,245
  - Density: 779.7/km^{2} (2,019/sq mi)
  - Households: 15,412

Economy
  - Income class: 1st municipal income class
  - Poverty incidence: 11.9% (2023)
  - Revenue: ₱ 252.4 million (2024)
  - Assets: ₱ 73.9 million (2024)
  - Expenditure: ₱ 213.9 million (2024)
  - Liabilities: ₱ 83.96 million (2024)

Service provider
  - Electricity: Iloilo 1 Electric Cooperative (ILECO 1)
- Time zone: UTC+8 (PST)
- ZIP code: 5027
- PSGC: 0603045000
- IDD : area code: +63 (0)33
- Native languages: Karay-a; Hiligaynon; Ati; Tagalog
- Website: www.tigbauan.gov.ph

Tigbauan, officially the Municipality of Tigbauan (Kinaray-a: Banwa kang Tigbauan; Hiligaynon: Banwa sang Tigbauan; Tagalog: Bayan ng Tigbauan), is a municipality in the province of Iloilo, Philippines. According to the 2024 census, it has a population of 65,657 people.

== History ==
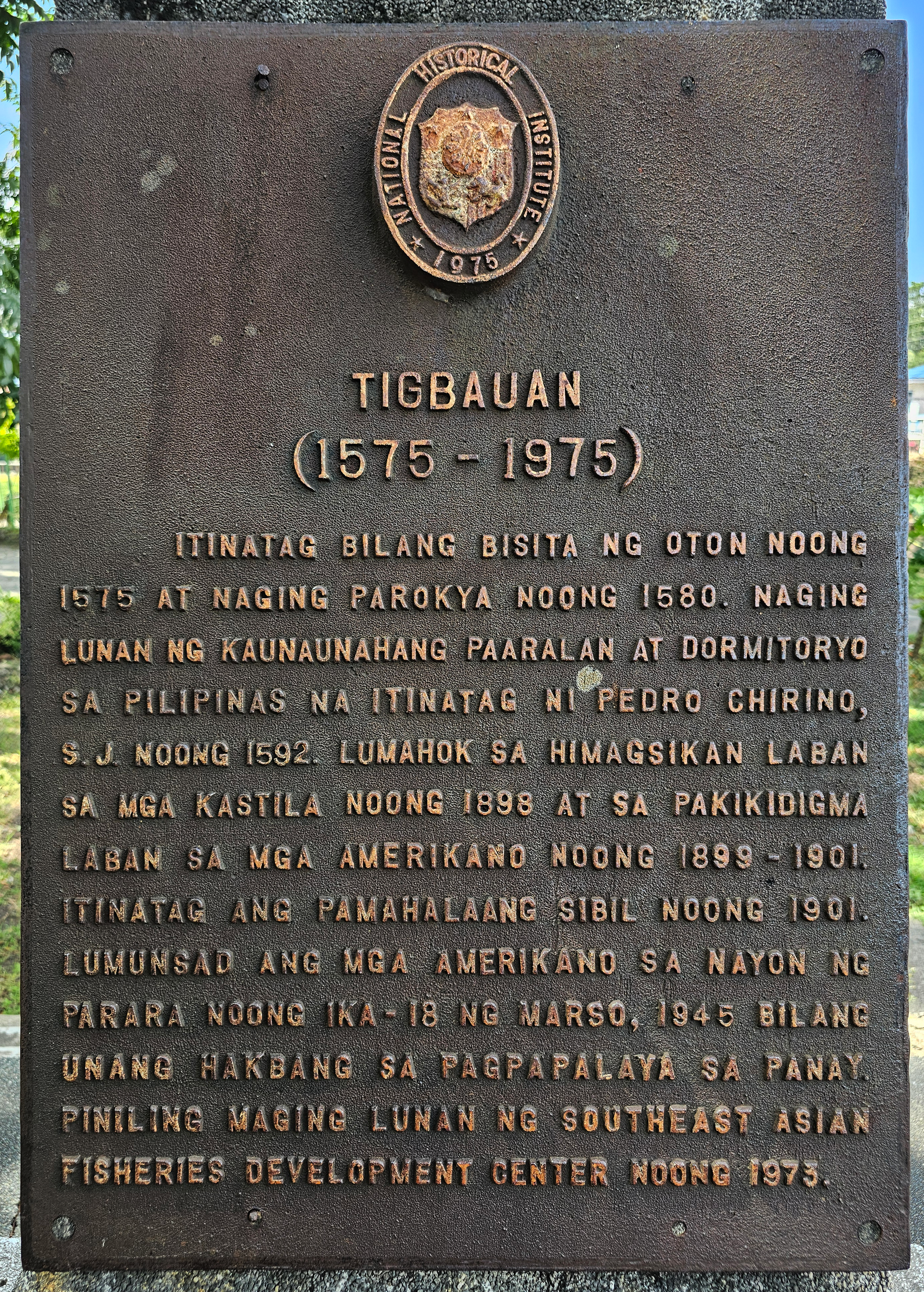
Tigbauan historical marker inside the church courtyard

=== Spanish colonial era ===
On January 1592, Jesuit missionaries arrived from Luzon to Panay, where they would work at the encomienda of Tigbauan. The Spaniards described the ancient inhabitants of the region as the Ati people, while the lowlanders were called the Visayans. The missionaries recorded that there had been a war between the Visayan lowlanders and the Negritos before their arrival.

"They call the reed-grass tigbao, and, by derivation, the lands which bear this grass are called Tigbauan; and because the site of this village is close to a great expanse of reedy land on the bank of a beautiful stream, it bears the above name. The village itself was on the same shore, at the mouth of the river—which, as well as the sea, yields various kinds of fish, excellent and plentiful, which I myself have enjoyed in abundance. As they were continually fishing on the beach, usually with three or four nets, they never made a haul without devoutly regaling us with a part of it. Tigbauan has a very beautiful district, with many villages extending more than six leguas along the coast of the sea; the entire district is well supplied with game, fruits, and vegetables, and fish from the sea. The people are very industrious; consequently I always saw them occupied—the men, with their fisheries and farming; the women, with their spinning and weaving. What we accomplished in the two years spent among a people so good and well-disposed towards the Gospel could be told in less time than what we left undone; for, since we of the Society of Jesus were then so few, and had little hope of increasing our number, we did not dare to undertake more than we thought could probably be maintained; and in this we were not mistaken, for at the present day, when at least a dozen ministers are needed, there is actually but one secular priest. For that reason we did not dare to baptize adults or children, except in cases of extreme danger, outside of the chief village (which is Tigbauan) and two or three other outlying hamlets, distant two miles or less."

-- Fr. Pedro Chirino, Relacion de las Islas Filipinas, (1604)

During the Spanish period Tigbauan was also the location of a Jesuit Elementary School for Visayan and Spanish boys.

=== World War II ===
Tigbauan was the site where American forces, code-named Victorino I, landed on March 18, 1945, together with the Philippine Commonwealth troops under the Philippine Commonwealth Army's 61st, 62nd and 63rd Infantry Divisions and the Philippine Constabulary's 6th Infantry Regiment to begin the liberation of Panay. The troops set out from Lingayen Gulf, Luzon on March 14. The 185th Infantry, 40th Division, splashed ashore at Tigbauan, several miles west of Iloilo. There they were greeted by Army Col. Macario L. Peralta's Filipino guerrillas and continued with the Philippine Commonwealth troops drawn up in parade formation. General Eichelberger recalled in his memoirs how the guerrillas stood "stiff in starched khaki and resplendent with ornaments." The strong guerrilla force of 23,000 had secured most of the island' except the area immediately around Iloilo where 2,750 Japanese were ensconced. The 40th Division quickly swept through the Japanese outposts and then drove the Japanese from the city in two days. Again the Japanese withdrew after the initial fighting into the inaccessible mountain jungles. In the fighting, the Americans lost 20 men, the Filipinos lost 42 men, and the Japanese 80. Responsibility for mopping up was turned over to the Filipino guerrillas and the 2d Battalion, 160th Infantry. Some 1,500 Japanese later surrendered at the end of the war. Because General MacArthur planned to stage two divisions from Iloilo for the invasion of Japan, engineers began repairing the local airfield and starting base construction at once.

== Geography ==
The municipality has flat terrain. The plain constitutes approximately 57% of the total area, covering about 6,667 hectares. along the north-west site of the Sibalom River. Along the boundaries of Guimbal, Leon and Tubungan are rolling hills covering an area of about 1,518 hectares. The municipality has no forest coverage. The highest point is 200 metres (660 ft) above sea level and the lowest is one meter above sea level. The town has two main rivers, Sibalom and Tacuyong River. The first originates from the mountain portion of Panay passing through the town of Leon and snaking through the barangays of Cordova Norte and Cordova Sur, Bitas and Bagumbayan, the western portion of the poblacion and empties into Panay Gulf. The second emanates from the junction of Barangay San Rafael, Binaliuan Menor, Nagba, Dorong-an and joins the Sibalom River in the Southern portion of the Poblacion. Aside from the rivers, there are creeks and natural springs, which could be a good source of water supply and could also be used as natural drainage. It is 22 kilometres (14 mi) from Iloilo City.

Of the total 8,889 has., 93.78% is devoted to agriculture and allied activities. Of this area, 1,077 has. are planted with coconuts, 4,554 has. are planted with rice and 19 has. are devoted to fishponds. Around 60 has. located in urban areas serve residential, commercial, and institutional purposes.

=== Climate ===
Climate data for Tigbauan, Iloilo
Month	Jan	Feb	Mar	Apr	May	Jun	Jul	Aug	Sep	Oct	Nov	Dec	Year
Mean daily maximum °C (°F)	30 (86)	31 (88)	32 (90)	33 (91)	32 (90)	30 (86)	29 (84)	29 (84)	29 (84)	29 (84)	30 (86)	30 (86)	30 (87)
Mean daily minimum °C (°F)	21 (70)	21 (70)	22 (72)	23 (73)	24 (75)	25 (77)	24 (75)	24 (75)	24 (75)	24 (75)	23 (73)	22 (72)	23 (74)
Average precipitation mm (inches)	19 (0.7)	17 (0.7)	26 (1.0)	37 (1.5)	119 (4.7)	191 (7.5)	258 (10.2)	260 (10.2)	248 (9.8)	196 (7.7)	97 (3.8)	39 (1.5)	1,507 (59.3)
Average rainy days	7.2	5.2	8.3	11.9	22.3	26.5	28.3	28.2	27.3	26.4	18.7	11.8	222.1
Source: Meteoblue

=== Barangays ===
Tigbauan is politically subdivided into 52 barangays. Each barangay consists of puroks and some have sitios.

- Alupidian
- Atabayan
- Bagacay
- Baguingin
- Bagumbayan
- Bangkal
- Bantud
- Barangay 1 (Poblacion)
- Barangay 2 (Poblacion)
- Barangay 3 (Poblacion)
- Barangay 4 (Poblacion)
- Barangay 5 (Poblacion)
- Barangay 6 (Poblacion)
- Barangay 7 (Poblacion)
- Barangay 8 (Poblacion)
- Barangay 9 (Poblacion)
- Barosong
- Barroc
- Bitas
- Bayuco
- Binaliuan Mayor
- Binaliuan Menor
- Buenavista
- Bugasongan
- Buyu-an
- Canabuan
- Cansilayan
- Cordova Norte
- Cordova Sur
- Danao
- Dapdap
- Dorong-an
- Guisian
- Isawan
- Isian
- Jamog
- Lanag
- Linobayan
- Lubog
- Nagba
- Namocon
- Napnapan Norte
- Napnapan Sur
- Olo Barroc
- Parara Norte
- Parara Sur
- San Rafael
- Sermon
- Sipitan
- Supa
- Tan Pael
- Taro

== Demographics ==
Tigbauan Municipal Hall

Population census of Tigbauan
Year	Pop.	±% p.a.
1903	10,948	—
1918	11,831	+0.52%
1939	17,092	+1.77%
1948	19,603	+1.53%
1960	22,804	+1.27%
1970	27,396	+1.85%
1975	30,722	+2.32%
1980	34,540	+2.37%
1990	43,934	+2.44%
1995	47,158	+1.34%
2000	50,446	+1.46%
2007	54,574	+1.09%
2010	58,814	+2.76%
2015	62,706	+1.23%
2020	65,245	+0.84%
2024	65,657	+0.15%
Source: Philippine Statistics Authority

In the 2024 census, the population of Tigbauan was 65,657 people, with a density of 780 inhabitants per square kilometre or 2,000 inhabitants per square mile.

== Economy ==
Poverty incidence of Tigbauan (%)

Source: Philippine Statistics Authority

Tigbauan ranks as one of the leading municipalities of Iloilo in fish production in the ten coastal barangays of Barroc, Atabayan, Baguingin, Namocon, Tan Pael, Barangay No. 8, Barangay 9, Parara Norte, Parara Sur and Buyu-an. The latest survey showed that barangays Barroc, Atabayan and Baguingin produced less than 2,000 tons of fish mill and bagoong and were sold to fish millers and poultry raisers in the province.

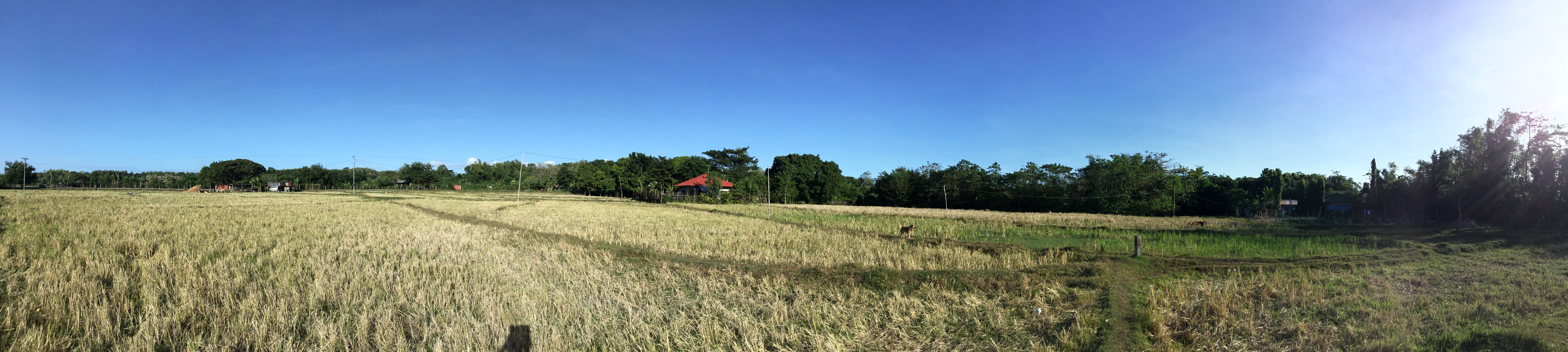
Rice fields, Barangay Parara Sur.

== Culture ==
=== Saludan Festival ===
Saludan came from the word salud. Tigbauan is a coastal town, its sea water abound in different kinds of fish. An excerpt from a book, “The Philippine Islands,” by Blair and Robertson; 1493. 1898; Vol. XII, pp. 217, 219-220 of which Fr. Pedro Chirino related his experience and observations about the town states that, “The village itself was on the same shore, at the mouth of the river, of which I myself have enjoyed in abundance. As they were continually fishing on the beach, usually with three or four nets, they never made a haul without devoutly is regaling us with a part of it.”

Since the beginning of recorded history, fishermen have used nets or woven bamboos to catch fish from the sea or rivers, and in the local dialect they call this salud.

On the other hand, aside from winter resources, our forests, farmers and hills are also abound in rich natural resources.

The book further states that “Tigbauan has a very beautiful district with many villages extending more than six leagues along the coast of the sea; the entire district is well supplied with game, fruits, and vegetables and fish from the sea. The people are very industrious and always pre-occupied the men with their fisheries and farming, the women with their spinning and weaving…” Primarily, their farm product is rice. Whether crude farming ways and tools or modern agricultural machineries are used we use the term salud. In threshing rice using the old method or the modern equipment – kita nagasalud man gihapon. Their tuba is famous for its sweetness and as practiced and tuba ginasalud kang salud, and salud also means the method of catching "hipon" or shrimp ("Salud ta sa Palupadan"). The term was coined by then, Sangguniang Bayan Member Rexfel G. Trivilegio of Barangay Atabayan, Tigbauan, Iloilo. Thus, the Saludan Festival was born.

=== Adlaw sang Tigbauan ===
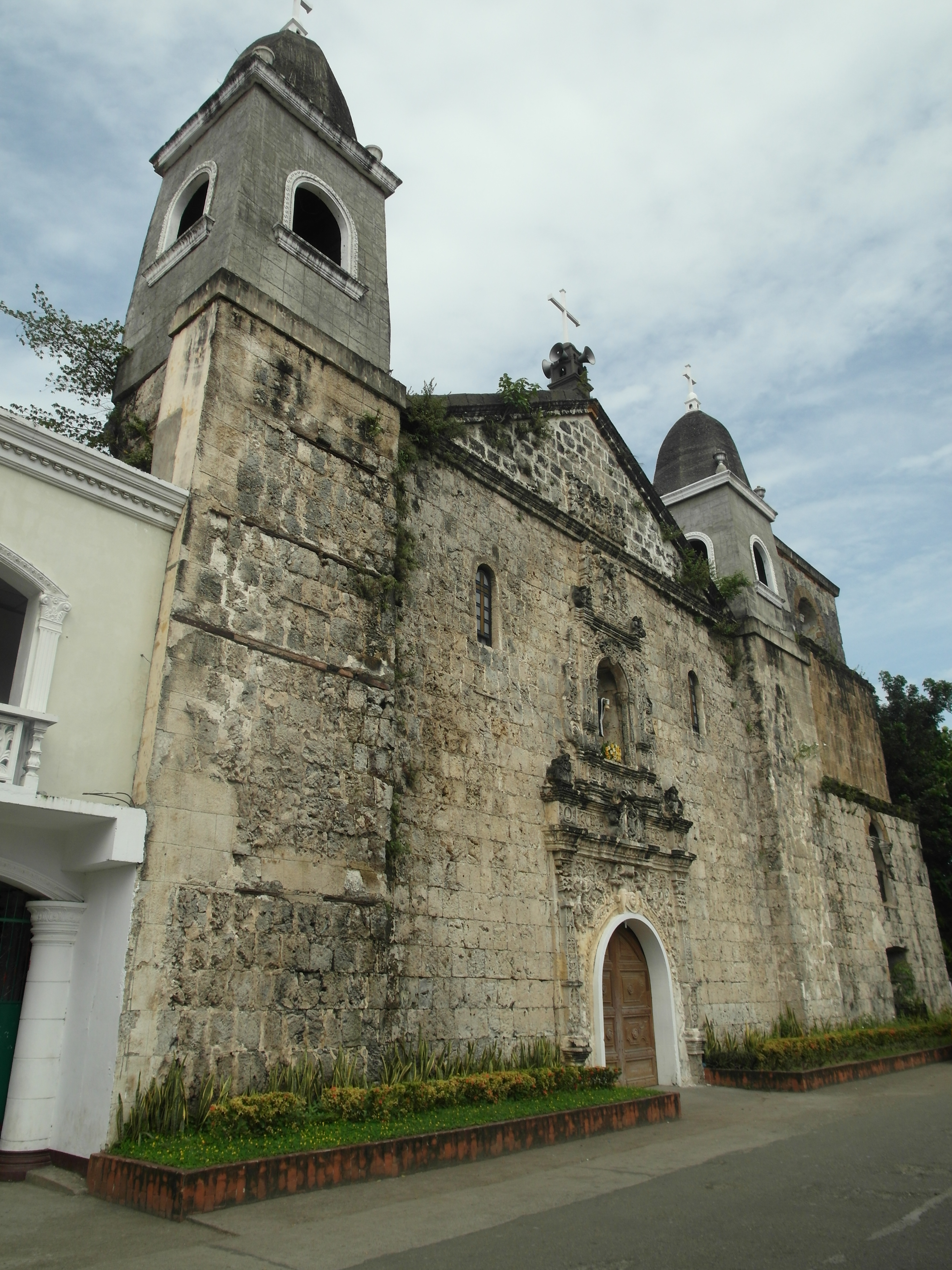
San Juan Sahagun Parish, Tigbauan

During the first term of Mayor of Tigbauan Myrna M. Torres in 1998, she signed an Executive Order declaring the third Friday of October every as the “Adlaw sang Tigbauan”.

History tells us that because of the increase in population in Sirawagan area (the place where the Bornean datus settled), the families from the tribes of Labing-Isog and Mangwalis sought for greener pasture. Following the course of the rising sun they landed in the place which they called “Katigbawan” because of the plentiful growth of giant grasses known to them as “tigbaw”. This place was said to be Parara by word of mouth handed down from generation to generation, it is believed that the families of Labing-Isog and Mangwalis reached the place when the native feasted for bountiful rice.

To the present time, the season for gathering rice crop is mostly in October. During this time of the year the fishermen also rejoice for a bountiful sea catch. Thus, “Adlaw Sang Tigbauan” is celebrated in October. To make this day more significant, the “Saludan Festival” was launched.

Tigbauan is one of Iloilo's most historically significant municipalities, since it has historical architecture and artifacts dating back to its founding in 1575, including the Tigbauan Church itself.

The town is home to St. John of Sahagun Parish. Constructed using forced labor under Fray Florencio Martin in 1867, the church gives visitors a glimpse of the community's intense spirituality. Its remarkable architecture with baroque façade and tower survived the ravages of the Second World War and the great earthquake in 1948. Presently, the altar depicts Heaven and Dante's Inferno, and the church walls the Way of the Cross, all done in intricate mosaics of colored stones. On its grounds remains a marker of what was once the site of the first Jesuit boarding school for boys in the Philippines established in 1592.

The beach in Barangay Parara was the landing site of America's 40th Infantry Division to liberate Panay and Romblon during the Second World War on March 18, 1945. The same area became the landing site in the 13th century of the descendants of the Bornean datus.

== Education ==
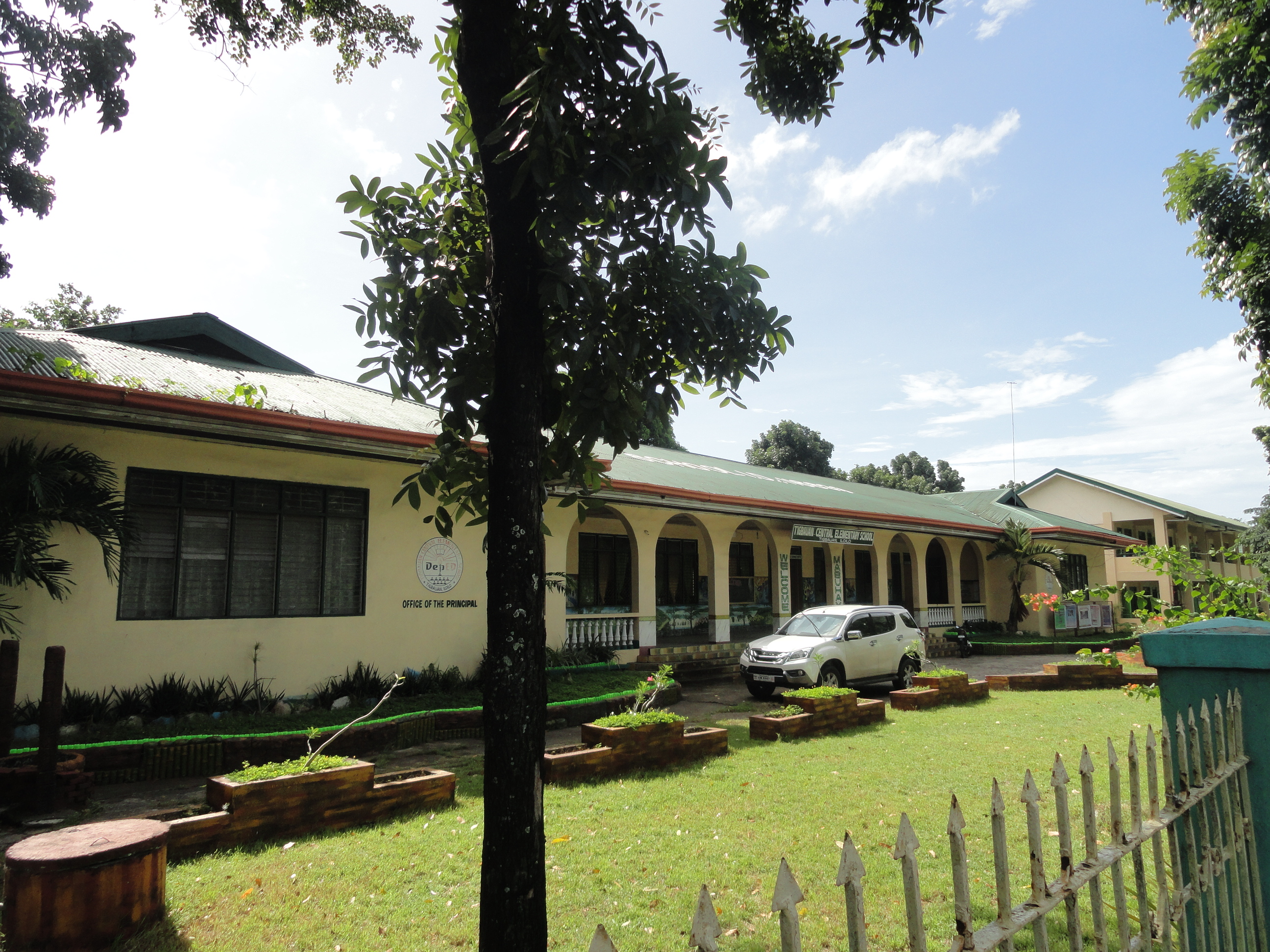
Tigbauan Central Elementary School

Tigbauan has 21 public elementary schools, seven private schools, five primary schools, 45 day care centers, 10 national high (Secondary) schools, four private preparatory schools, and one Catholic kindergarten school. Schools are encouraged to establish and maintain biological/ vegetable garden and participate in the coastal and environmental cleanup and tree planting.
