= Richard Garin =

Filipino politician (born 1967)

The Honorable Richard Garin

Mayor of Miagao
- Incumbent
- Assumed office June 30, 2022
- Vice Mayor: Macario Napulan (2022–2025); Ma. Salve N. Pechayco (since 2025)
- Preceded by: Macario Napulan

Member of the Philippine House of Representatives from Iloilo's 1st congressional district
- In office June 30, 2013 – June 30, 2019
- Preceded by: Janette Garin
- Succeeded by: Janette Garin

Vice Governor of Iloilo
- In office June 30, 2010 – June 30, 2013
- Governor: Arthur Defensor Sr.
- Preceded by: Rolex Tupas Suplico
- Succeeded by: Raul Tupas

Member of the Sangguniang Panlalawigan of Iloilo from the 1st district
- In office June 30, 2007 – June 30, 2010
- In office June 30, 1992 – June 30, 1998

Mayor of Guimbal
- In office June 30, 1998 – June 30, 2007
- Succeeded by: Christine Garin

Member of the Sangguniang Bayan of Guimbal
- Ex officio
- In office 1982–?
- Sector: Kabataang Barangay

Personal details
- Born: Oscar Serag Garin; December 11, 1967 (age 58)
- Party: Lakas (2021–present)
- Other political affiliations: Liberal (2012–2017); Nacionalista (2017–2021)
- Spouse: Janette Loreto
- Children: Rica Jane Garin
- Parents: Oscar Garin Sr. (father); Ninfa Serag (mother)
- Relatives: Sharon Garin (sister); Janette "Jennifer" Garin (sister); Christine Garin (sister)
- Education: University of San Agustin (BS)

Oscar "Richard" Serag Garin Jr. (born December 11, 1967) is a Filipino politician and civil engineer serving as the mayor of Miagao, Iloilo since 2022. He was previously the Representative of Iloilo's 1st district, Vice Governor of Iloilo, member of Iloilo's provincial board, and mayor of Guimbal.

== Early life and education ==
Oscar "Richard" Garin Jr. was born on December 11, 1967 to Oscar Garin Sr., a civic leader and environmentalist, and Ninfa Serag Garin, a politician. He and his three sisters, Sharon, Janette ("Jennifer", born 1969), and Christine (born 1973), all became politicians.

Richard Garin is a civil engineer by profession. He finished his studies at the University of San Agustin in 1990 and passed the Board Examinations for Civil Engineers given that same year.

He's also an alumni member of Central Philippine University.

== Political career ==
His career in politics started in 1982 when he was elected as Guimbal Municipal Federation President of the Kabataang Barangay, the precursor of the present day Sangguniang Kabataan. At 24 years old, he was elected in 1992 as a member of the sangguniang panlalawigan (provincial board) of Iloilo, representing the First District, and was re-elected to the same position in 1995. In 1998, he opted out on his last term as board member to run for municipal mayor of Guimbal, Iloilo, which he won, and served in the position for three terms until 2007.

He returned to the provincial board as a senior board member and floor leader in 2007. He was elected vice governor of the province of Iloilo in 2010 with a margin of about 180,000 votes.

He authored legislations providing social pensions for indigent senior citizens who are at least 70 years old, and the establishment of independent high schools in the country. He has filed several bills in Congress, among the most significant and important are House Bills 2147, 3417, 3418 and 3420. When he was vice governor of Iloilo from 2010 to 2013, he also promoted similar social legislations, like the Senior Citizens Ordinance of 2012, Person with Disability Ordinance of 2012 and the Solo Parents Ordinance of 2013.

In 2021, he transferred his voter's registration to Miagao, Iloilo, where outgoing mayor Macario Napulan is his political ally. In the 2022 election, he was elected mayor of Miagao.

== Personal life ==
Garin is married to Janette Loreto-Garin of Leyte, a doctor by profession, a former secretary of the Department of Health and the incumbent representative of the First District of Iloilo. She was a member of the House of Representatives for three terms, from 2004 to 2013. They have a daughter, Rica Jane (born 1997), who is currently serving as provincial board member in Iloilo for its First District.
