= Guimbal =

Municipality in Iloilo, Philippines

- Municipality
- Municipality of Guimbal
- Aerial view of Poblacion, Guimbal

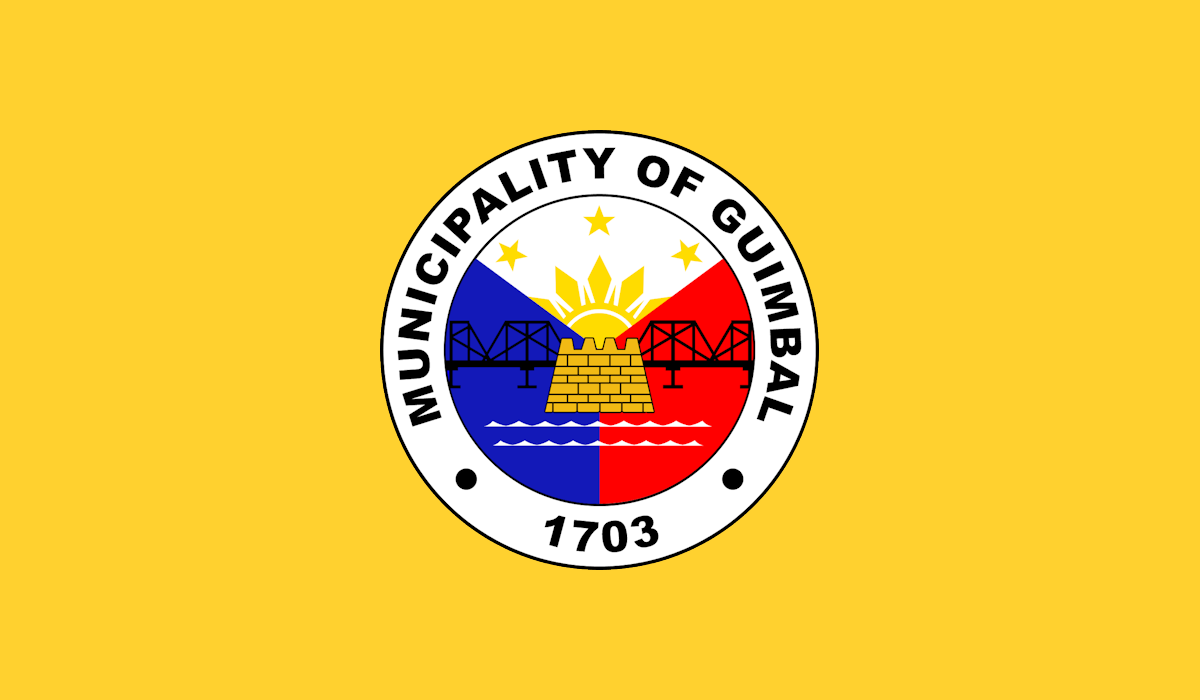
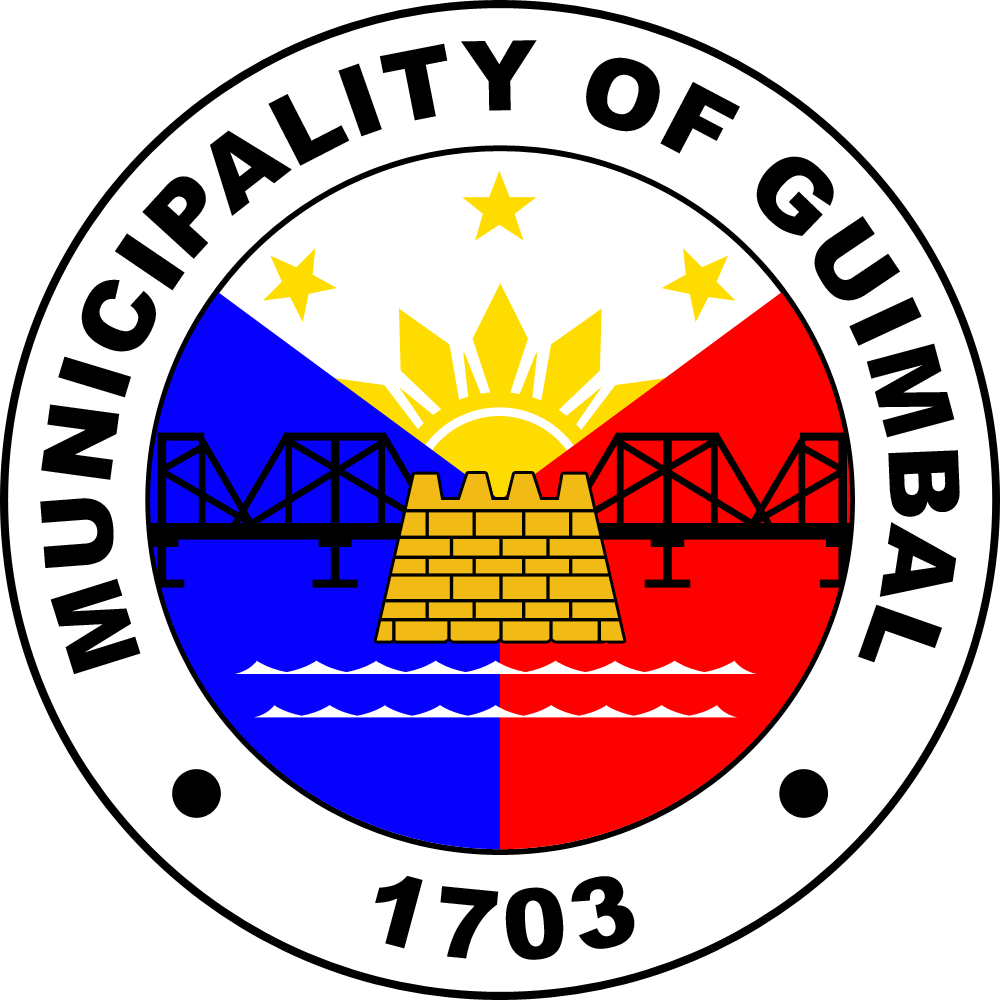
- Flag Seal
- Nickname: "The Town of the Rising Sun & Sons"
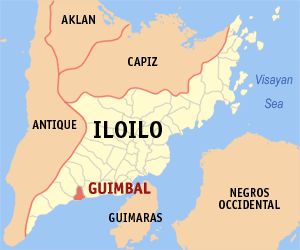
- Map of Iloilo with Guimbal highlighted
- Interactive map of Guimbal
- Location within the Philippines
- Coordinates: 10°40′N 122°19′E
- Country: Philippines
- Region: Western Visayas
- Province: Iloilo
- District: 1st district
- Founded: 1703
- Barangays: 33 (see Barangays)

Government
  - Type: Sangguniang Bayan
  - Mayor: Jennifer S. Garin-Colada (Lakas)
  - Vice Mayor: Christine S. Garin (Lakas)
  - Representative: Janette L. Garin (Lakas)
  - Municipal Council: Members: Mary Ann S. Lujan (Lakas); Reina Paz G. Alipao (Lakas); Christy Love C. Margarico (Lakas); Lemuel S. Geollegue (Lakas); Marcelino G. Gelvero, Sr. (Lakas); Ivy S. Gequiniana (Lakas); Jo Marie S. Temelo (Lakas); Lorna G. Young (Lakas); Rey Angelo G. Gonzales ^{‡}; Ma. Yumilca G. Gepulle ^{◌}; ‡ ex officio ABC president; ◌ ex officio SK chairman
  - Electorate: 25,103 voters (2025)

Area
  - Total: 44.61 km^{2} (17.22 sq mi)
- Elevation: 84 m (276 ft)
- Highest elevation: 1,270 m (4,170 ft)
- Lowest elevation: 0 m (0 ft)

Population (2024 census)
  - Total: 35,129
  - Density: 787.5/km^{2} (2,040/sq mi)
  - Households: 8,887

Economy
  - Income class: 3rd municipal income class
  - Poverty incidence: 7.43% (2023)
  - Revenue: ₱ 219.9 million (2024)
  - Assets: ₱ 585.5 million (2024)
  - Expenditure: ₱ 87.97 million (2024)
  - Liabilities: ₱ 42.48 million (2024)

Service provider
  - Electricity: Iloilo 1 Electric Cooperative (ILECO 1)
- Time zone: UTC+8 (PST)
- ZIP code: 5022
- PSGC: 063020000
- IDD : area code: +63 (0)33
- Native languages: Karay-a; Hiligaynon; Tagalog
- Website: guimbal-iloilo.gov.ph

Guimbal, officially the Municipality of Guimbal (Kinaray-a: Banwa kang Guimbal; Hiligaynon: Banwa sang Guimbal; Tagalog: Bayan ng Guimbal), is a municipality in the province of Iloilo, Philippines. According to the 2024 census, it has a population of 35,129 people.

With a 9 kilometres (5.6 mi) shoreline facing the blue waters of Panay Gulf, it has attracted tourists from different places because of its scenic beaches and inland resorts.

Guimbal produces mango in Iloilo as well as other seasonal fruits. Farming and fishing are among the main sources of livelihood of its people.

== History ==
The first reference to Guimbal by such name in Spanish records appeared in Father Coco's appendix to Medina's “The History of the Augustinian Order in the Philippines” where it referred to the establishment of a convent in Guimbal, Iloilo in 1590.

A closer fact compared to some other writings showed that the name of the municipality was derived from a musical instrument called guimba drum. The Spaniards discovered the settlers using the instrument to warn the people of the coming of the raiding Moro pirates who used to loot the town and capture the natives to be sold as slaves in Mindanao. To show gratitude to the instrument, with high spirit and pride as the unconquered people, the inhabitants had named their settlement Guimbal.

== Geography ==
Guimbal, a coastal municipality, is located at the south-western part of Iloilo province. It is situated between the coordinates of 1250 57’ longitude, and 100 39’ latitude. It is 29 kilometres (18 mi) from Iloilo City, and has a total land area of 4,461 hectares (11,020 acres). It is only six feet above sea level, and has varying features in terms of its slopes and elevation.

=== Barangays ===
Guimbal is politically subdivided into 33 barangays. Each barangay consists of puroks and some have sitios.

There are 11 barangays located within the Poblacion (Town Center) and the rest are outside poblacion.

- Anono-o
- Bacong
- Baras
- Binanua-an
- Bongol San Miguel
- Bongol San Vicente
- Bulad
- Buluangan
- Cabasi
- Cabubugan
- Calampitao
- Camangahan
- Igcocolo
- Iyasan
- Lubacan
- Nahapay
- Nalundan
- Nanga
- Nito-an
- Particion
- Santa Rosa-Laguna
- Sipitan-Badiang

Poblacion Area:

- Bagumbayan
- Balantad-Carlos Fruto
- Burgos-Gengos
- Generosa-Cristobal Colon
- Gerona-Gimeno
- Girado-Magsaysay
- Gotera
- Libo-on-Gargaritano-Gonzales
- Pescadores
- Rizal-Tuguisan
- Torreblanca-Blumentritt

=== Climate ===
Climate data for Guimbal, Iloilo
Month	Jan	Feb	Mar	Apr	May	Jun	Jul	Aug	Sep	Oct	Nov	Dec	Year
Mean daily maximum °C (°F)	30 (86)	31 (88)	32 (90)	33 (91)	32 (90)	30 (86)	29 (84)	29 (84)	29 (84)	29 (84)	30 (86)	30 (86)	30 (87)
Mean daily minimum °C (°F)	21 (70)	21 (70)	22 (72)	23 (73)	25 (77)	25 (77)	25 (77)	24 (75)	24 (75)	24 (75)	23 (73)	22 (72)	23 (74)
Average precipitation mm (inches)	19 (0.7)	17 (0.7)	26 (1.0)	37 (1.5)	119 (4.7)	191 (7.5)	258 (10.2)	260 (10.2)	248 (9.8)	196 (7.7)	97 (3.8)	39 (1.5)	1,507 (59.3)
Average rainy days	7.2	5.2	8.3	11.9	22.3	26.5	28.3	28.2	27.3	26.4	18.7	11.8	222.1
Source: Meteoblue

Type I climate, characterized by two district seasons: dry season, which falls from December to May, and the wet season, which is from June to December.

== Demographics ==
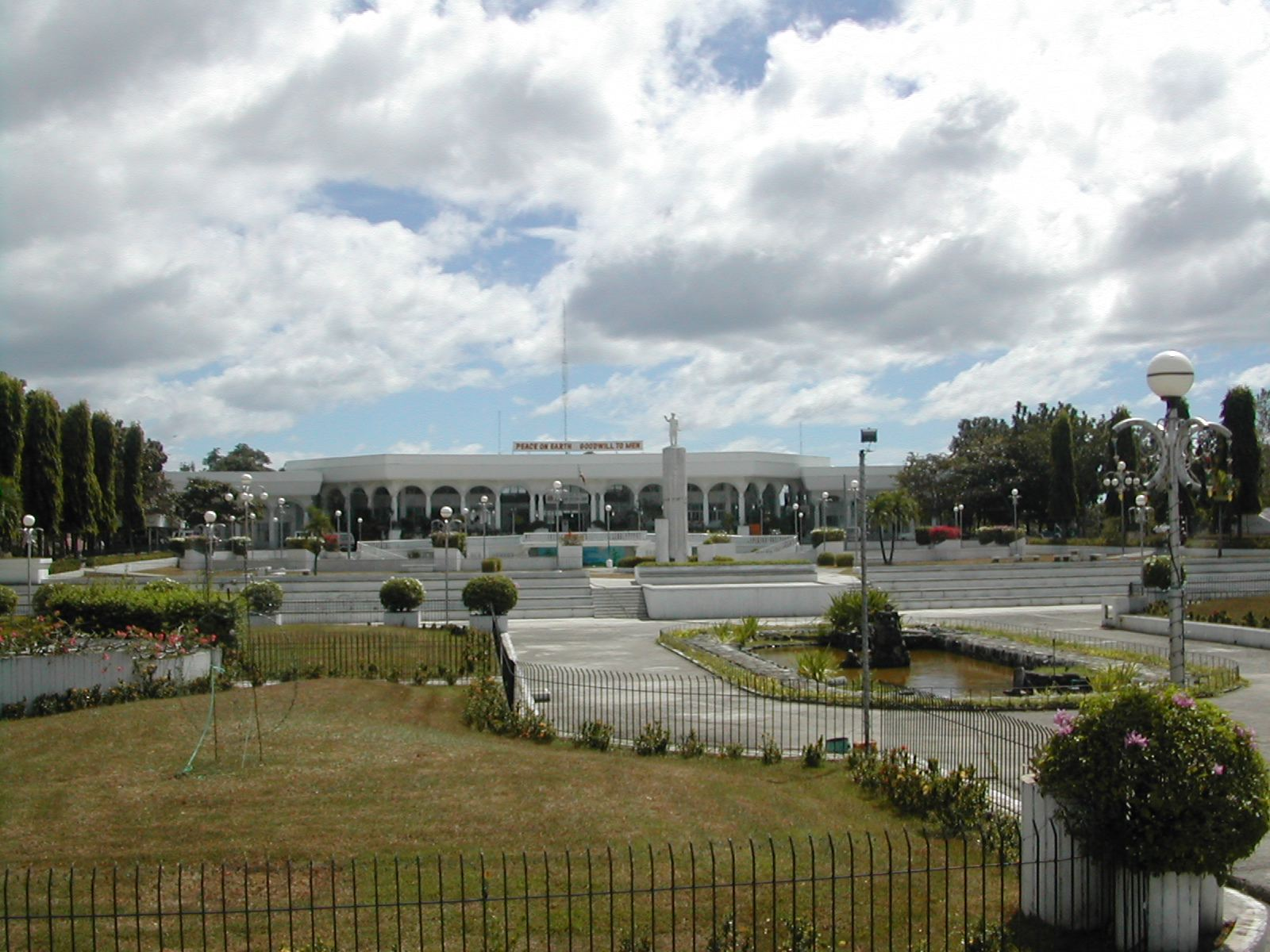
New Guimbal Municipal Hall

Population census of Guimbal
Year	Pop.	±% p.a.
1903	7,530	—
1918	23,964	+8.02%
1939	11,128	−3.59%
1948	11,862	+0.71%
1960	13,487	+1.08%
1970	16,306	+1.91%
1975	18,041	+2.05%
1980	19,502	+1.57%
1990	23,478	+1.87%
1995	26,316	+2.16%
2000	27,707	+1.11%
2007	29,724	+0.97%
2010	32,325	+3.10%
2015	33,820	+0.86%
2020	35,022	+0.74%
2024	35,129	+0.07%
Source: Philippine Statistics Authority

In the 2024 census, the population of Guimbal was 35,129 people, with a density of 790 inhabitants per square kilometre or 2,000 inhabitants per square mile.

== Economy ==
Poverty incidence of Guimbal (%)

Source: Philippine Statistics Authority

== Transportation ==
A 45-minute drive from Iloilo City, Guimbal is accessible from all points of Panay Island. its baranggays are served by municipal and other provincial jeepneys and buses that pass through the town and by almost 180 tricycles and 350 motorbikes playing their respective routes. The transport of farm products to the poblacion and the city is made easy by farm-to-market roads.

== Culture ==
- Bantayan Festival: A celebration of the birth of a new history and culture of the people of Guimbal as a tribute and reverence to the triumphant struggle of its ancestors for meaningful existence.The magic of the Gimba (drum) and the Bantayan (watchtower) are the major features of the festival. The festival also features dance drama, drum, float & street dancing competition, film festival, cultural shows, beauty pageant, paraw & boat racing, fluvial parade, musical concerts and many other presentations.
- Disyembre sa Guimbal Celebration: A two-week pompous and extravagant celebration of Christmas which started in 1975, and is held from 16th to 25 December. It has gained popular support from all sector in the municipality that made it successful annual celebration.
- Annual Town Fiesta: Celebrated every 10 September in honor of St. Nicholas of Tolentino, the town's patron saint, and this week-long celebration reflects the kind of people Guimbalanon's are festive. Various activities are lined up, making celebration colorful.
- Holy Week celebration (Bari-Bari): A unique observance in the Lenten season, parishioners religiously preserve the tradition of the catholic faith of remembering and observing the passion of Lord Jesus Christ. People put up the 14 kapiyas depicting the 14 station of the cross along the lansangan. After the procession of Holy Thursday and good Friday, people do the bari-bari taking the route of the procession to take a closer look of the kapiyas. Holy week is also a time of reunions, homecoming and other social gatherings for the Guimbalanons.

== Tourism ==
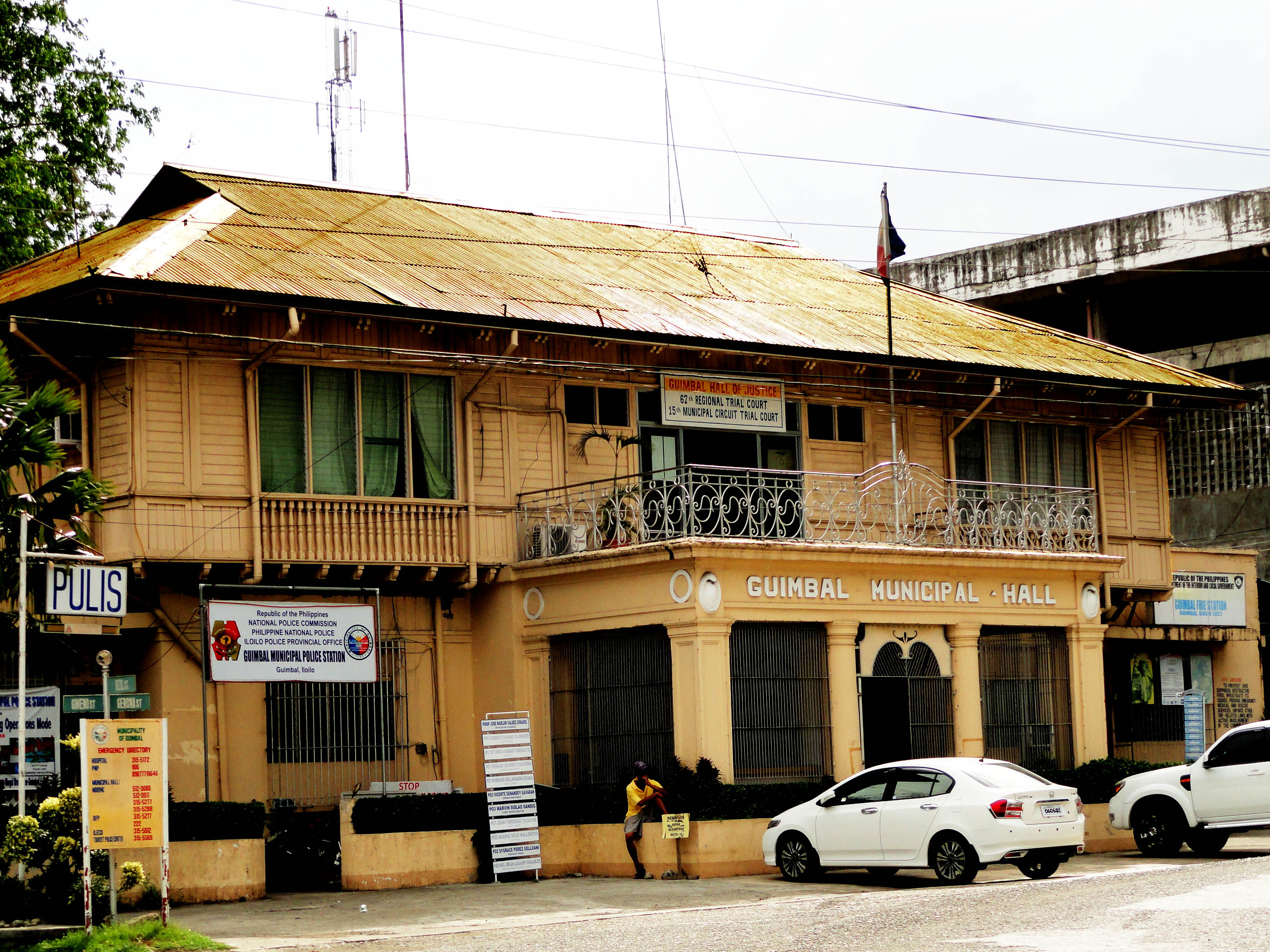
Old Guimbal Municipal Hall

- Guimbal Church: The 400-year-old church is made of yellow adobe and coral stones, one of the oldest in the country.
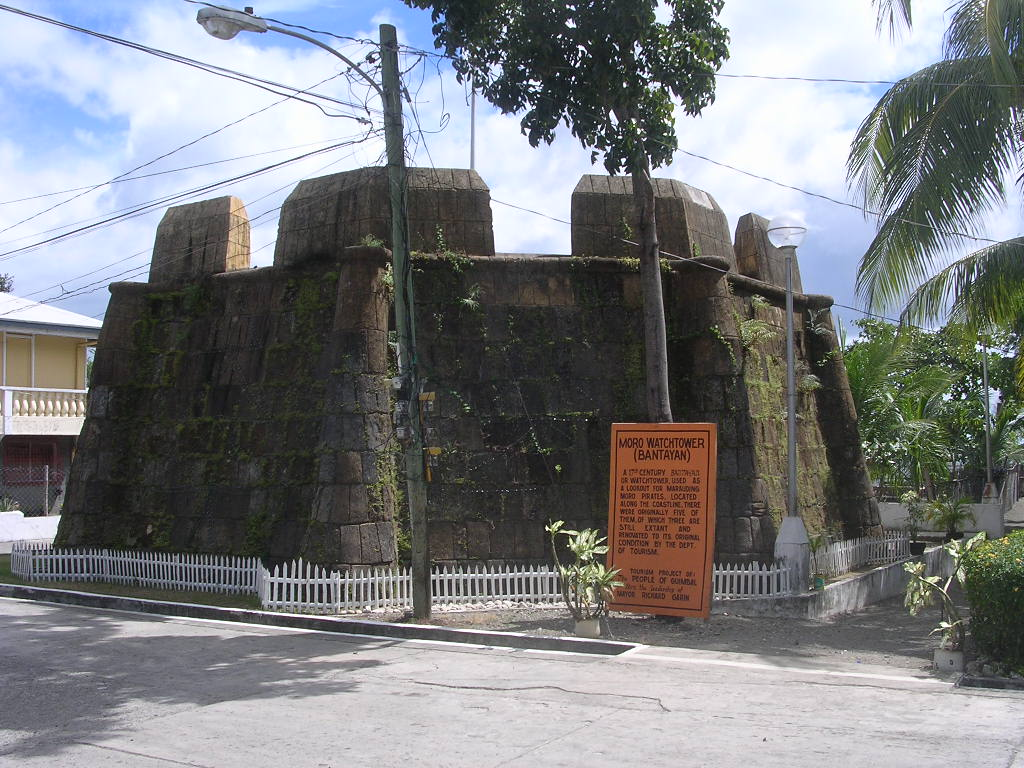
- One of the Moro watchtowers in Guimbal
  Moro Watchtowers: Originally, there were four structures located in different sites along the shoreline area in the poblacion. Only three are still intact and renovated to its original condition through the Department of Tourism. These are the 17th Century structures used as look-out for raiding Moro pirates. Like the church, it was also constructed through force labor.
- Guimbal Steel Bridge: Constructed during the American period. The construction was ordered by US President Roosevelt. It is approximately 0.350 kilometers long and made of Pittsburgh Steel, which were imported from Virginia, USA. It is the longest steel bridge in Western Visayas.
- Public Plaza: Known for its beautiful ornamental plants and landscapes, the plaza is described by many as the little Luneta of southern Iloilo. It is well-maintained and well-lighted at night. It can be likened to a European labyrinth.
- New Municipal Building: Guimbal's symbol of public service, the new municipal building houses local and national government offices in the municipality. It is branded by many as the “Parthenon of Western Visayas.” In front of the Athenian conceived open coliseum and an amphitheatre where cultural shows, programs, sports, activities, and public gatherings are held. One can experience being in the golden age of history just walking around.
- Taytay Tigre: A short bridge constructed during the Spanish colonial period. It is commonly known as “Taytay Tigre” because of the tiger stone structure made part of its approaches on both sides guarding the bridge before one enters the poblacion. It was reconstructed through donation from a veteran Guimbalanon.
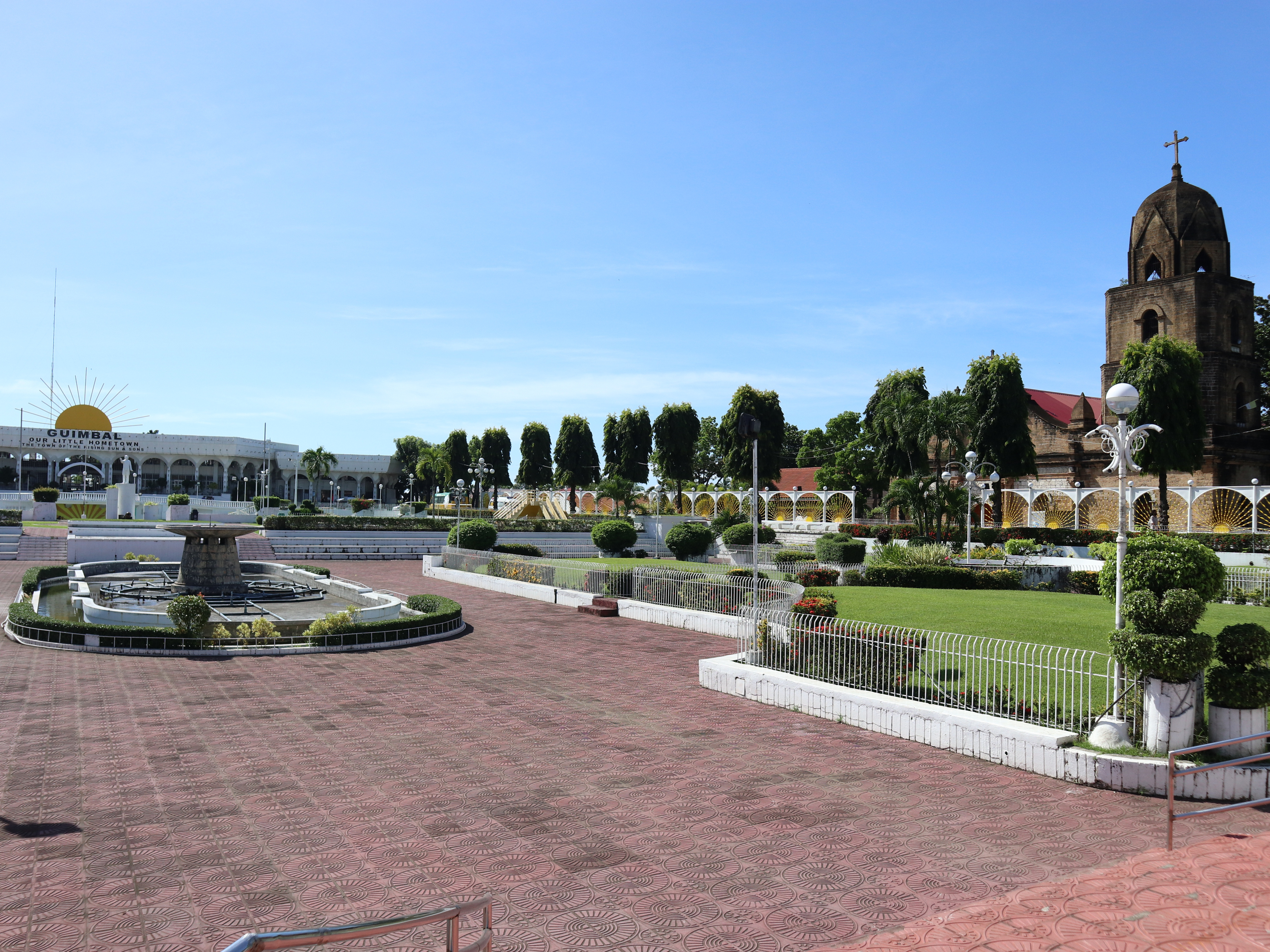
  Guimbal Public Plaza
- Ayaw-ayaw Monument: Situated on a hill, near Nahapay Elementary School. It is a life-size replica of Andres Bonifacio, father of Philippine Revolution standing proud with his bolo on his right hand. Ayaw-ayaw is a word that signifies opposition from anything or anyone. The monument was erected on the site where early American soldiers met resistance from revolutionaries. It is a symbol of bravery, a manifestation of deep love for true freedom and independence shown by revolutionaries who resisted foreign dominion.

== Education ==
The Guimbal Schools District Office governs all educational institutions within the municipality. It oversees the management and operations of all private and public, from primary to secondary schools.

Primary and elementary schools

- Guimbal Central Elementary School
- Atty. Blas and Maria Gerona Memorial Elementary School
- Buluangan Elementary School
- Camangahan Elementary School
- P.G. Garin Memorial Elementary School
- Igcocolo Elementary School
- Nahapay Elementary School
- Nalundan Elementary School
- Particion Elementary School
- Sipitan-Badiang Elementary School

Secondary schools

- Cabasi-Sta. Rosa Integrated School
- Camangahan National High School
- Guimbal National High School
- Nalundan National High School
- Nanga Integrated School
- Particion National High School

== Notable personalities ==
- Jesus Dureza – lawyer, consultant, journalist, and politician
- Richard Garin – former mayor
