= Iloilo's 1st congressional district =

Legislative district of the Philippines

- Constituency for the House of Representatives of the Philippines
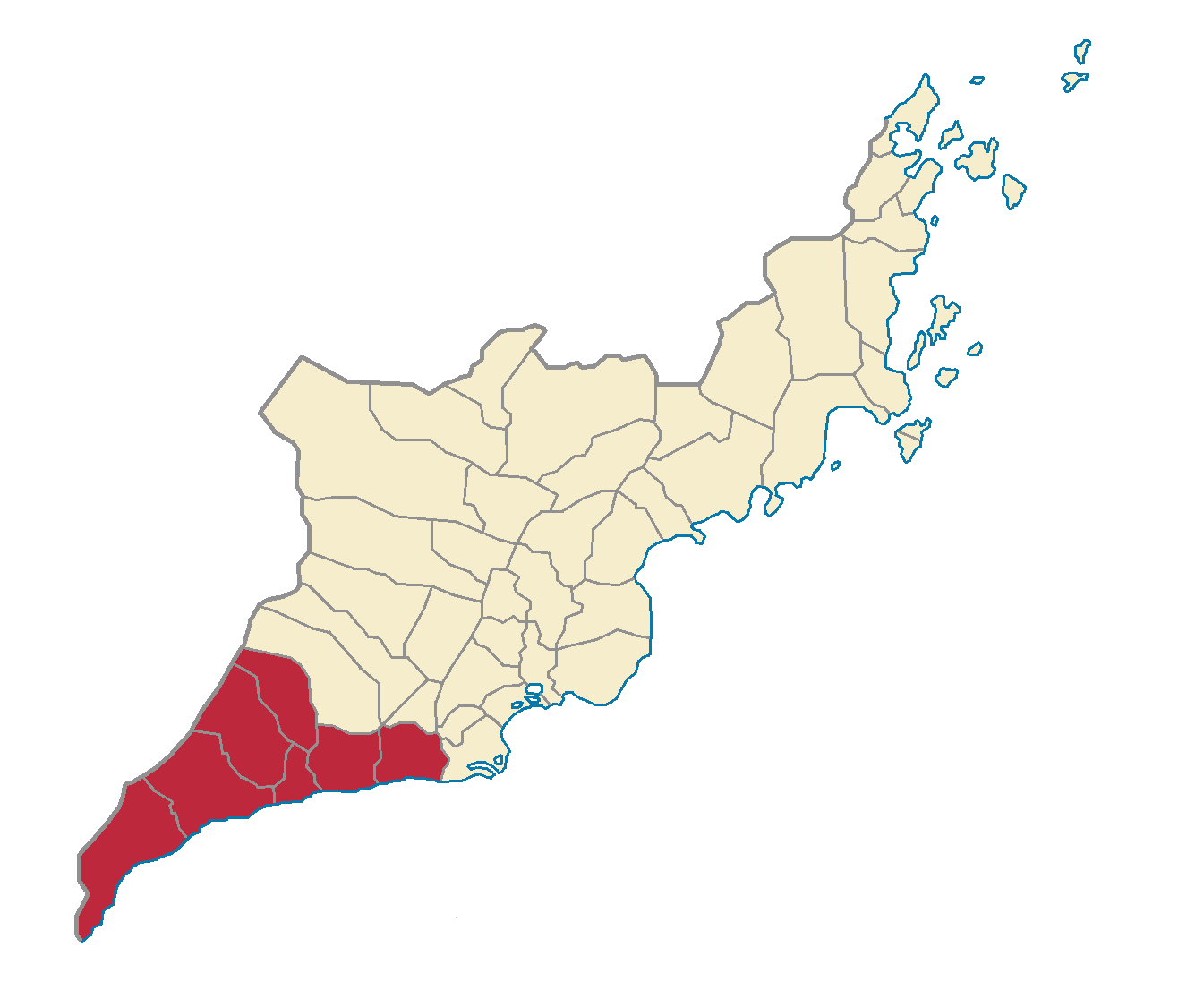
- Boundary of Iloilo's 1st congressional district in Iloilo

- Location of Iloilo within the Philippines
- Province: Iloilo
- Region: Western Visayas
- Population: 374,726 (2020)
- Electorate: 228,690 (2022)
- Major settlements: 7 LGUs: Municipalities; Guimbal; Igbaras; Miagao; Oton; San Joaquin; Tigbauan; Tubungan
- Area: 840.27 km^{2} (324.43 sq mi)

Current constituency
- Created: 1907
- Representative: Janette Garin
- Political party: Lakas–CMD
- Congressional bloc: Majority

Iloilo's 1st congressional district is one of the five congressional districts of the Philippines in the province of Iloilo. It has been represented in the House of Representatives of the Philippines since 1916 and earlier in the Philippine Assembly from 1907 to 1916. The district consists of the municipalities of Guimbal, Igbaras, Miagao, Oton, San Joaquin, Tigbauan and Tubungan. It is currently represented in the 20th Congress by Janette Garin of the Lakas–CMD.

== List of members representing the district ==
=== Philippine Assembly (1907–1916) ===
Portrait	Member (Lifespan)	Term of office	Party	Legislature	Electoral history	Constituencies
District created January 9, 1907.
	Amando Avanceña (1879–1953)	October 16, 1907 – October 16, 1909	Nacionalista	1st Legislature	Elected in 1907.	1907–1912 Guimbal, Miagao, Oton, Tigbauan
	Francisco Felipe Villanueva (1867–1923)	October 16, 1909 – October 16, 1916	Progresista	2nd Legislature	Elected in 1909.	1907–1912 Guimbal, Miagao, Oton, Tigbauan
	Francisco Felipe Villanueva (1867–1923)	October 16, 1909 – October 16, 1916	Progresista	3rd Legislature	Re-elected in 1912.	1912–1916; Guimbal, Miagao, Oton, San Joaquin, Tigbauan

=== House of Representatives (1916–1935) ===
Portrait	Member (Lifespan)	Term of office	Party	Legislature	Electoral history	Constituencies
	José María Arroyo (1875–1927)	October 16, 1916 – June 3, 1919	Nacionalista	4th Legislature	Re-elected in 1916.	1916–1919; Guimbal, Miagao, Oton, San Joaquin, Tigbauan
	Jose Evangelista (1887–1930)	June 3, 1919 – June 2, 1925	Nacionalista	5th Legislature	Elected in 1919.	1919–1935; Guimbal, Igbaras, Miagao, Oton, San Joaquin, Tigbauan
	Jose Evangelista (1887–1930)	June 3, 1919 – June 2, 1925	Nacionalista Colectivista	6th Legislature	Re-elected in 1922.	1919–1935; Guimbal, Igbaras, Miagao, Oton, San Joaquin, Tigbauan
	Eugenio Ealdama	June 2, 1925 – June 5, 1928	Democrata	7th Legislature	Elected in 1925.	1919–1935; Guimbal, Igbaras, Miagao, Oton, San Joaquin, Tigbauan
	Jose Zulueta (1889–1972)	June 5, 1928 – November 15, 1935	Nacionalista Consolidado	8th Legislature	Elected in 1928.	1919–1935; Guimbal, Igbaras, Miagao, Oton, San Joaquin, Tigbauan
	Jose Zulueta (1889–1972)	June 5, 1928 – November 15, 1935	Nacionalista Consolidado	9th Legislature	Re-elected in 1931.	1919–1935; Guimbal, Igbaras, Miagao, Oton, San Joaquin, Tigbauan
	Jose Zulueta (1889–1972)	June 5, 1928 – November 15, 1935	Nacionalista Democratico	10th Legislature	Re-elected in 1934.	1919–1935; Guimbal, Igbaras, Miagao, Oton, San Joaquin, Tigbauan

=== 1934 Constitutional Convention (1934–1935) ===
Seat A					Seat B					Legislature	Constituencies
Portrait	Member (Lifespan)	Term of office	Party	Electoral history	Portrait	Member (Lifespan)	Term of office	Party	Electoral history	Legislature	Constituencies
	Mariano Ezpeleta	July 30, 1934 – February 19, 1935	Nonpartisan	Elected in 1934.		Sofronio M. Flores	July 30, 1934 – February 19, 1935	Nonpartisan	Elected in 1934.	1934 Constitutional Convention	1934–1935; Guimbal, Igbaras, Miagao, Oton, San Joaquin, Tigbauan

=== National Assembly (1935–1945) ===
==== Commonwealth ====
Portrait	Member (Lifespan)	Term of office	Party	Legislature	Electoral history	Constituencies
	Jose Zulueta (1889–1972)	November 15, 1935 – December 30, 1941	Nacionalista Democratico	1st National Assembly	Re-elected in 1935.	1935–1938; Guimbal, Igbaras, Miagao, Oton, San Joaquin, Tigbauan
	Jose Zulueta (1889–1972)	November 15, 1935 – December 30, 1941	Nacionalista	2nd National Assembly	Elected in 1938.	1938–1941; Guimbal, Igbaras, Miagao, Oton, San Joaquin, Tigbauan, Tubungan
District dissolved into the two-seat Negros Occidental's at-large district for the Second Republic National Assembly.

=== House of Representatives (1945–1973) ===
Portrait	Member (Lifespan)	Term of office	Party	Legislature	Electoral history	Constituencies
District re-created May 24, 1945.
	Jose Zulueta (1889–1972)	June 9, 1945 – May 28, 1946	Nacionalista	1st Commonwealth Congress	Re-elected in 1941.	1945–1973; Guimbal, Igbaras, Miagao, Oton, San Joaquin, Tigbauan, Tubungan
	Jose Zulueta (1889–1972)	June 9, 1945 – May 28, 1946	Liberal	2nd Commonwealth Congress	Re-elected in 1946. Resigned on appointment as Secretary of the Interior.	1945–1973; Guimbal, Igbaras, Miagao, Oton, San Joaquin, Tigbauan, Tubungan
	Jose Zulueta (1889–1972)	June 9, 1945 – May 28, 1946	Liberal	1st Congress	Re-elected in 1946. Resigned on appointment as Secretary of the Interior.	1945–1973; Guimbal, Igbaras, Miagao, Oton, San Joaquin, Tigbauan, Tubungan
Vacant (May 28, 1946 – March 11, 1947)				1st Congress	—	1945–1973; Guimbal, Igbaras, Miagao, Oton, San Joaquin, Tigbauan, Tubungan
	Mateo Nonato	March 11, 1947 – December 30, 1949	Liberal	1st Congress	Elected in 1947 to finish Zulueta's term.	1945–1973; Guimbal, Igbaras, Miagao, Oton, San Joaquin, Tigbauan, Tubungan
	Jose Zulueta (1889–1972)	December 30, 1949 – December 30, 1951	Liberal	2nd Congress	Elected in 1949. Resigned on election as senator.	1945–1973; Guimbal, Igbaras, Miagao, Oton, San Joaquin, Tigbauan, Tubungan
	Jose Zulueta (1889–1972)	December 30, 1949 – December 30, 1951	Nacionalista	2nd Congress	Elected in 1949. Resigned on election as senator.	1945–1973; Guimbal, Igbaras, Miagao, Oton, San Joaquin, Tigbauan, Tubungan
Vacant (December 30, 1951 – December 30, 1953)				2nd Congress	No special election held to fill vacancy.	1945–1973; Guimbal, Igbaras, Miagao, Oton, San Joaquin, Tigbauan, Tubungan
	Pedro Trono	December 30, 1953 – December 30, 1969	Democratic	3rd Congress	Elected in 1953.	1945–1973; Guimbal, Igbaras, Miagao, Oton, San Joaquin, Tigbauan, Tubungan
	Pedro Trono	December 30, 1953 – December 30, 1969	Nacionalista	4th Congress	Re-elected in 1957.	1945–1973; Guimbal, Igbaras, Miagao, Oton, San Joaquin, Tigbauan, Tubungan
	Pedro Trono	December 30, 1953 – December 30, 1969	Liberal	5th Congress	Re-elected in 1961.	1945–1973; Guimbal, Igbaras, Miagao, Oton, San Joaquin, Tigbauan, Tubungan
	Pedro Trono	December 30, 1953 – December 30, 1969	Liberal	6th Congress	Re-elected in 1965.	1945–1973; Guimbal, Igbaras, Miagao, Oton, San Joaquin, Tigbauan, Tubungan
	Jose Zulueta (1889–1972)	December 30, 1969 – January 17, 1973	Nacionalista	7th Congress	Elected in 1969. Term cut short upon the ratification of a new Constitution.	1945–1973; Guimbal, Igbaras, Miagao, Oton, San Joaquin, Tigbauan, Tubungan
District dissolved into the sixteen-seat Region VI's at-large district for the Interim Batasang Pambansa, followed by the five-seat Iloilo's at-large district for the Regular Batasang Pambansa.

=== 1971 Constitutional Convention (1971–1972) ===
Seat A					Seat B					Legislature	Constituencies
Portrait	Member (Lifespan)	Term of office	Party	Electoral history	Portrait	Member (Lifespan)	Term of office	Party	Electoral history	Legislature	Constituencies
	Salvador Britanico	June 1, 1971 – November 29, 1972	Nonpartisan	Elected in 1970.		Lourdes Trono	June 1, 1971 – November 29, 1972	Nonpartisan	Elected in 1970.	1971 Constitutional Convention	1971–1972; Guimbal, Igbaras, Miagao, Oton, San Joaquin, Tigbauan, Tubungan

=== House of Representatives (1987–present) ===
Portrait	Member (Lifespan)	Term of office	Party	Legislature	Electoral history	Constituencies
District re-created February 2, 1987.
	Oscar G. Garin (1941–2021)	June 30, 1987 – June 30, 1998	LnB (until 1988)	8th Congress	Elected in 1987.	1987–present Guimbal, Igbaras, Miagao, Oton, San Joaquin, Tigbauan, Tubungan
	Oscar G. Garin (1941–2021)	June 30, 1987 – June 30, 1998	LDP (from 1988)	8th Congress	Elected in 1987.	1987–present Guimbal, Igbaras, Miagao, Oton, San Joaquin, Tigbauan, Tubungan
	Oscar G. Garin (1941–2021)	June 30, 1987 – June 30, 1998	Lakas	9th Congress	Re-elected in 1992.	1987–present Guimbal, Igbaras, Miagao, Oton, San Joaquin, Tigbauan, Tubungan
	Oscar G. Garin (1941–2021)	June 30, 1987 – June 30, 1998	Lakas	10th Congress	Re-elected in 1995.	1987–present Guimbal, Igbaras, Miagao, Oton, San Joaquin, Tigbauan, Tubungan
	Ninfa Garin (born 1944)	June 30, 1998 – June 30, 2001	Lakas	11th Congress	Elected in 1998.	1987–present Guimbal, Igbaras, Miagao, Oton, San Joaquin, Tigbauan, Tubungan
	Oscar G. Garin (1941–2021)	June 30, 2001 – June 30, 2004	NPC	12th Congress	Elected in 2001.	1987–present Guimbal, Igbaras, Miagao, Oton, San Joaquin, Tigbauan, Tubungan
	Janette Garin (born 1972)	June 30, 2004 – June 30, 2013	Lakas	13th Congress	Elected in 2004.	1987–present Guimbal, Igbaras, Miagao, Oton, San Joaquin, Tigbauan, Tubungan
	Janette Garin (born 1972)	June 30, 2004 – June 30, 2013	Lakas	14th Congress	Re-elected in 2007.	1987–present Guimbal, Igbaras, Miagao, Oton, San Joaquin, Tigbauan, Tubungan
	Janette Garin (born 1972)	June 30, 2004 – June 30, 2013	Liberal	15th Congress	Re-elected in 2010.	1987–present Guimbal, Igbaras, Miagao, Oton, San Joaquin, Tigbauan, Tubungan
	Richard Garin (born 1967)	June 30, 2013 – June 30, 2019	Liberal	16th Congress	Elected in 2013.	1987–present Guimbal, Igbaras, Miagao, Oton, San Joaquin, Tigbauan, Tubungan
	Richard Garin (born 1967)	June 30, 2013 – June 30, 2019	Nacionalista	17th Congress	Re-elected in 2016.	1987–present Guimbal, Igbaras, Miagao, Oton, San Joaquin, Tigbauan, Tubungan
	Janette Garin (born 1972)	June 30, 2019 – present	Nacionalista	18th Congress	Elected in 2019.	1987–present Guimbal, Igbaras, Miagao, Oton, San Joaquin, Tigbauan, Tubungan
	Janette Garin (born 1972)	June 30, 2019 – present	NUP (until 2021)	19th Congress	Re-elected in 2022.	1987–present Guimbal, Igbaras, Miagao, Oton, San Joaquin, Tigbauan, Tubungan
	Janette Garin (born 1972)	June 30, 2019 – present	Lakas (from 2021)	19th Congress	Re-elected in 2022.	1987–present Guimbal, Igbaras, Miagao, Oton, San Joaquin, Tigbauan, Tubungan
	Janette Garin (born 1972)	June 30, 2019 – present	Lakas (from 2021)	20th Congress	Re-elected in 2025.	1987–present Guimbal, Igbaras, Miagao, Oton, San Joaquin, Tigbauan, Tubungan

== Election results ==
=== 2010 ===
2010 Philippine House of Representatives elections in Iloilo
Party	Candidate	Votes	%
Lakas–Kampi	Janette Garin (incumbent)	111,947	100.00
Valid ballots		111,947	74.72
Invalid or blank votes		37,868	25.28
Total votes		149,815	100.00
Lakas–Kampi hold			

=== 2013 ===
2013 Philippine House of Representatives elections in Iloilo
Party	Candidate	Votes	%
Liberal	Oscar Garin Jr.	76,128	62.54
UNA	Julieta Flores	32,519	26.71
Margin of victory		43,609	35.82
Invalid or blank votes		13,082	10.75
Total votes		121,729	100.00
Liberal hold			

=== 2016 ===
2016 Philippine House of Representatives elections in Iloilo
Party	Candidate	Votes	%
Liberal	Oscar Garin Jr. (incumbent)	133,811	78.09
NPC	Gerardo Flores	18,283	10.67
Invalid or blank votes		19,267	11.24
Total votes		171,361	100.00

=== 2022 ===
2022 Philippine House of Representatives elections in Iloilo
Party	Candidate	Votes	%
NUP	Janette Garin (incumbent)	148,558	83.48
PDP–Laban	Victor Tabaquirao	29,388	16.52
Total votes		177,946	100.00
NUP hold			

=== 2025 ===
2025 Philippine House of Representatives elections in Iloilo
Party	Candidate	Votes	%
Lakas	Janette Garin (incumbent)	154,031	86.60
PDP	Victor Tabaquirao	19,929	11.20
Valid ballots		177,860	87.56
Invalid or blank votes		25,275	12.44
Total votes		203,135	100.00
NUP hold			

== See also ==
- Legislative districts of Iloilo

House of Representatives of the Philippines
Preceded by Tarlac's at-large congressional district	Home district of the speaker of the House of Representatives; June 9, 1945 – May 25, 1946	Succeeded by Pangasinan's 2nd congressional district
