= Janette Garin =

Filipina politician and physician (born 1972)

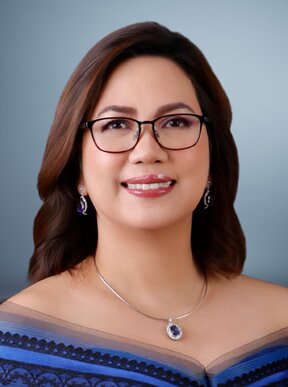
- Official portrait, 2025

Deputy Speaker of the House of Representatives of the Philippines
- Incumbent
- Assumed office July 28, 2025 Serving with several others
- House Speaker: Martin Romualdez; Faustino "Bojie" Dy III

Member of the Philippine House of Representatives from Iloilo's 1st district
- Incumbent
- Assumed office June 30, 2019
- Preceded by: Richard Garin
- In office June 30, 2004 – June 30, 2013
- Preceded by: Oscar Garin Sr.
- Succeeded by: Richard Garin

30th Secretary of Health
- In office February 17, 2015 – June 30, 2016
- President: Benigno Aquino III
- Preceded by: Enrique Ona
- Succeeded by: Paulyn Ubial

Member of the Iloilo Provincial Board from the 1st district
- In office June 30, 1998 – June 30, 2001

Personal details
- Born: Janette Petilla Loreto; December 11, 1972 (age 53) Baybay, Leyte, Philippines
- Party: Lakas (2001–2010, 2024–present)
- Other political affiliations: Liberal (2010–2018); Nacionalista (2018–2021); NUP (2021–2024)
- Spouse: Richard Garin
- Relations: Sharon Garin (sister-in-law)
- Education: Divine Word University of Tacloban (BS); St. Luke's College of Medicine; Iloilo Doctors' College (MD)
- Occupation: Politician
- Profession: Physician

Janette Loreto Garin (born Janette Petilla Loreto; December 11, 1972) is a Filipino physician and politician who has served as the representative for Iloilo's first district since 2019, a position she previously held from 2004 to 2013. She previously served as the 30th secretary of Health from 2015 to 2016 in the administration of President Benigno Aquino III.

During her tenure in Congress, she focused on various health issues such as curbing fraud in PhilHealth and amending the Physician's Act, among others. She has also advocated for women's issues, including pushing for the passage of the Responsible Parenthood and Reproductive Health Act of 2012. She played an active role in the enactment of the Cheaper Medicines Law and the Magna Carta of Women.

== Biography ==
Garin graduated with a Bachelor of Science in Medical Technology at the Divine Word University in Tacloban. She was a scholar at St. Luke's College of Medicine. She transferred and completed her Doctor of Medicine at the Iloilo Doctors' College. She had two years of residency training in Obstetrics and Gynecology at the Iloilo Doctor's Hospital. She later served as a member of the Iloilo Provincial Board for six years.

Garin was elected as the first Filipino board member to the Parliamentary Network on the World Bank (PNoWB) during its Sixth Annual Conference held in Helsinki, Finland on October 21–22, 2005. She was re-elected to this post for the following conference in Paris.

== Personal life ==
She is married to Richard S. Garin, son of former representative Oscar Gemarino Garin and Ninfa Serag Garin. Her daughter, Rica Jane, is a lawyer and an incumbent member of the Iloilo Provincial Board from the 1st district since 2025.

On August 18, 2021, Garin tested positive for COVID-19.

House of Representatives of the Philippines
Preceded by Oscar Garin	Representative, 1st district of Iloilo; 2004–2013	Succeeded by Richard Garin
Preceded by Richard Garin	Representative, 1st district of Iloilo; 2019–present	Incumbent
Political offices
Preceded by Enrique Ona	Philippine Secretary of Health; 2015 –2016	Succeeded by Paulyn Ubial
