= Guimbal Church =

Roman Catholic church in Iloilo, Philippines

- San Nicolas de Tolentino Parish Church
- Simbahang Parokyal ni San Nicolas ng Tolentino (Filipino)
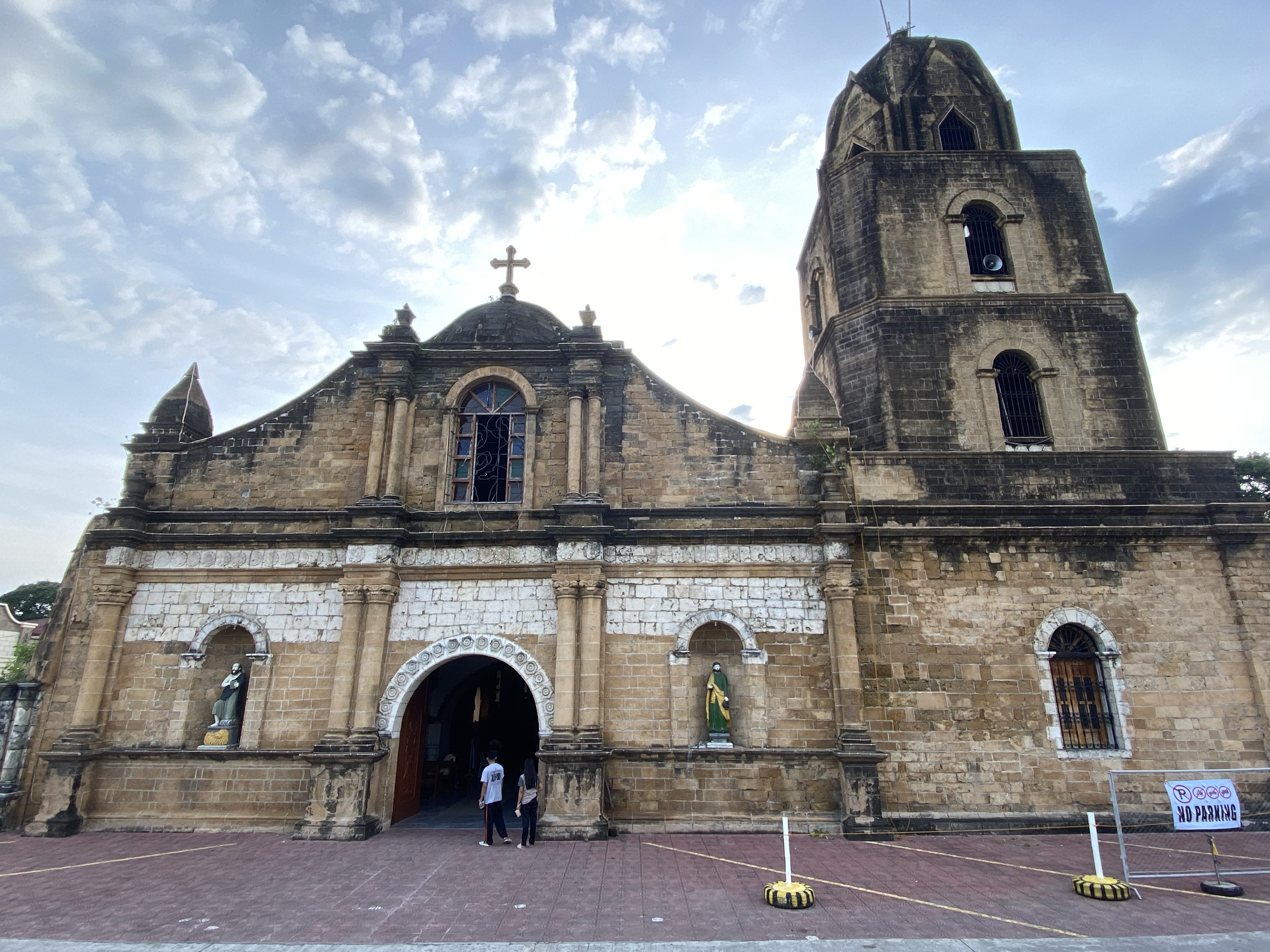
- Church façade in 2025

- Location in the Visayas Location in the Philippines
- 10°39′39″N 122°19′20″E
- Location: Guimbal, Iloilo
- Country: Philippines
- Denomination: Roman Catholic

Architecture
- Architectural type: Church building

Administration
- Archdiocese: Jaro

San Nicolas de Tolentino Parish Church, also known as Guimbal Church, is a Roman Catholic parish church located in the municipality of Guimbal, Iloilo in the Philippines. It is under the jurisdiction of the Archdiocese of Jaro.

== History ==
Guimbal Church was initially a visita of Oton and later of Tigbauan, established in 1575. Its status fluctuated over the centuries, changing from an independent parish to a visita and back again. In 1580, it became a separate parish from Tigbauan, and the Augustinians built a convent in 1590.

In 1617, Fr. Martin de Nicolas served as its vicar, but the parish was annexed under the secular clergy in 1618. The Augustinians took over the parish again in 1626, but in 1630, the diocese declined the administration of the town of Ajuy. By 1656, it was once again a visita of Tigbauan, regaining its independence in 1659, only to be reassigned to Tigbauan in 1667 and later to Miagao in 1703.

Originally a Marian church with Nuestra Señora de Consolacion as the patroness, the church later adopted St. Nicholas de Tolentino as its new patron in 1704. The construction of the church and convent began under Fr. Juan Campos between 1769 and 1774.

The church was severely damaged by an earthquake on July 13, 1787. Rebuilding efforts were led by Fr. Jose Orangren from 1893 to 1896. It suffered another setback with a fire in 1895, but was restored by Fr. Agustin Llorente. The church also sustained damage during World War II and the 1948 earthquake, which also destroyed the convent.

== Architecture ==
The church is primarily constructed of coral stone and yellow sandstone quarried from nearby Guimaras. The bell tower is seamlessly integrated with the church's facade, positioned on the epistle side. The tower features arch openings, with its uppermost level being hexagonal and adorned with triangular windows and a blind dormer, continuing into the domed roof topped with a cupola and cross.

The church's broken pediment curves inward, and at its apex is a rectilinear cornice, with finials, a stone dome, and a cupola with a cross. Paired Corinthian columns frame the pediment, with an arched stained-glass window positioned between them. These decorative columns also appear flanking the main entrance and the outermost posts of the church wall. The cornice features a row of rosettes in high relief, and the archway is decorated with a semicircular relief. At the ground level beside the entrance, two niches hold holy figures.

Inside, the narthex is separated from the nave by an archway. The ceiling is decorated with exposed rafters, and the nave walls are punctuated with arched apertures, allowing natural light to illuminate the interior.

== Gallery ==
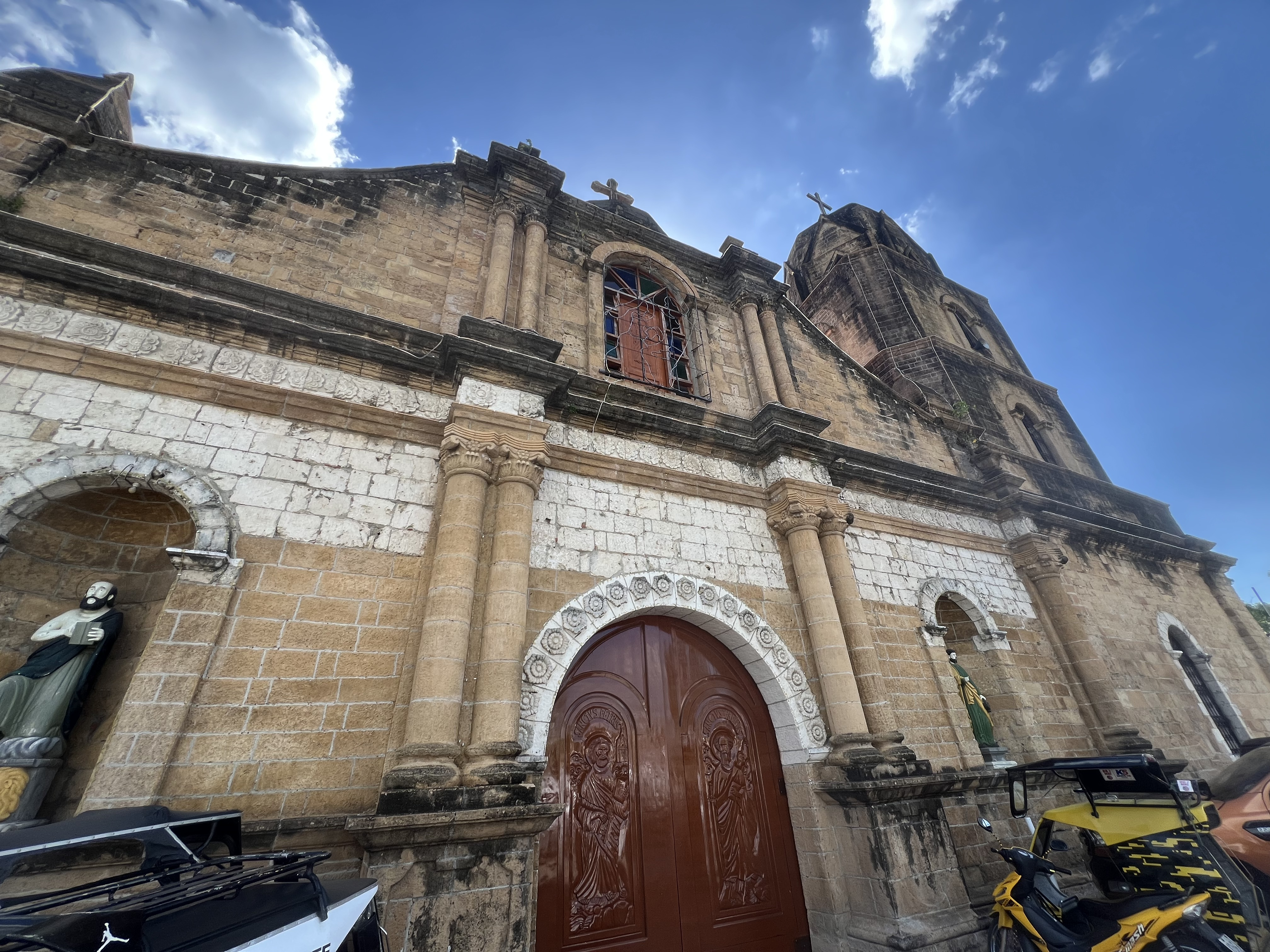
Façade

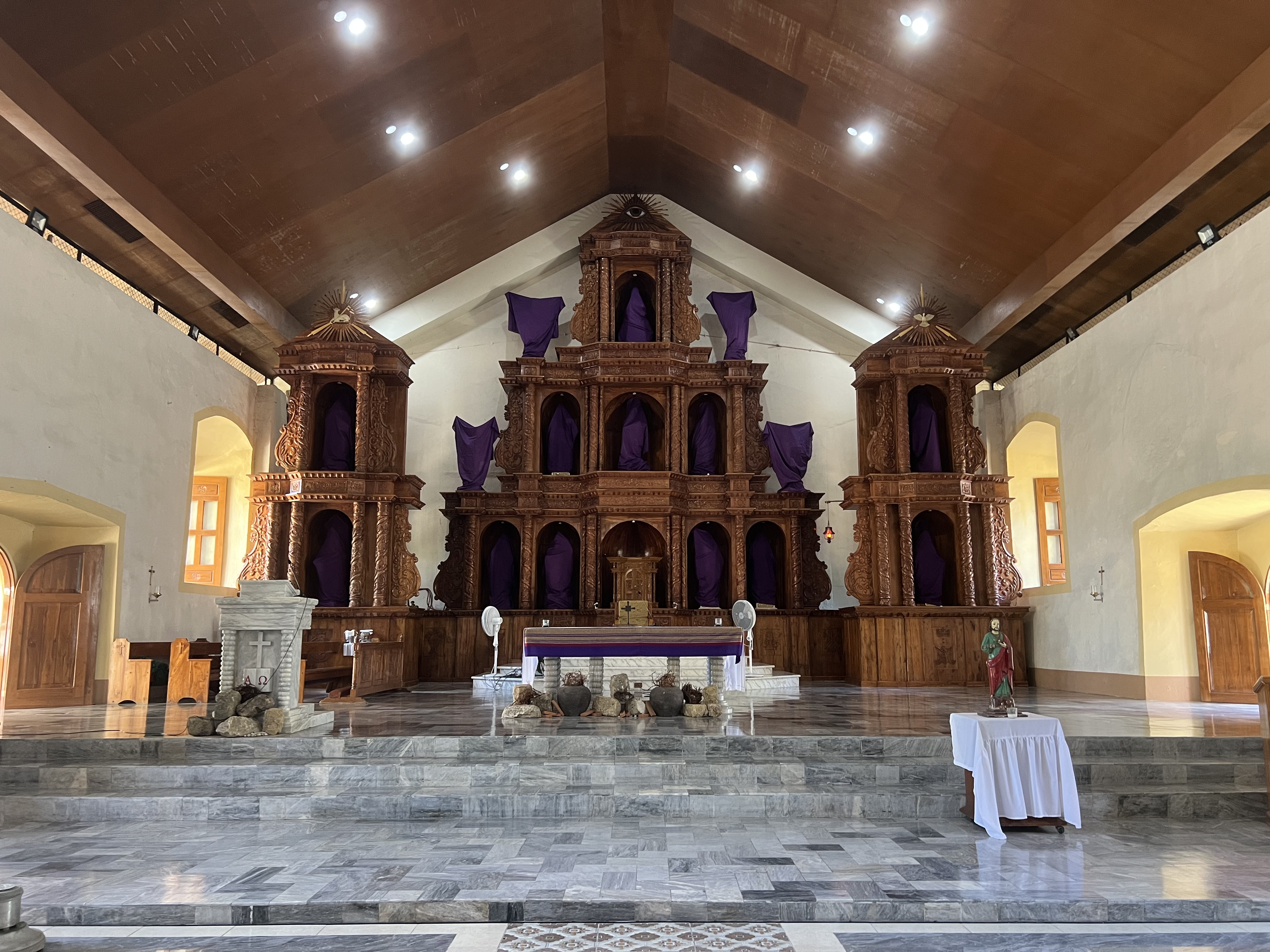
Central altar during the Lenten season, with the statuary covered with purple cloth

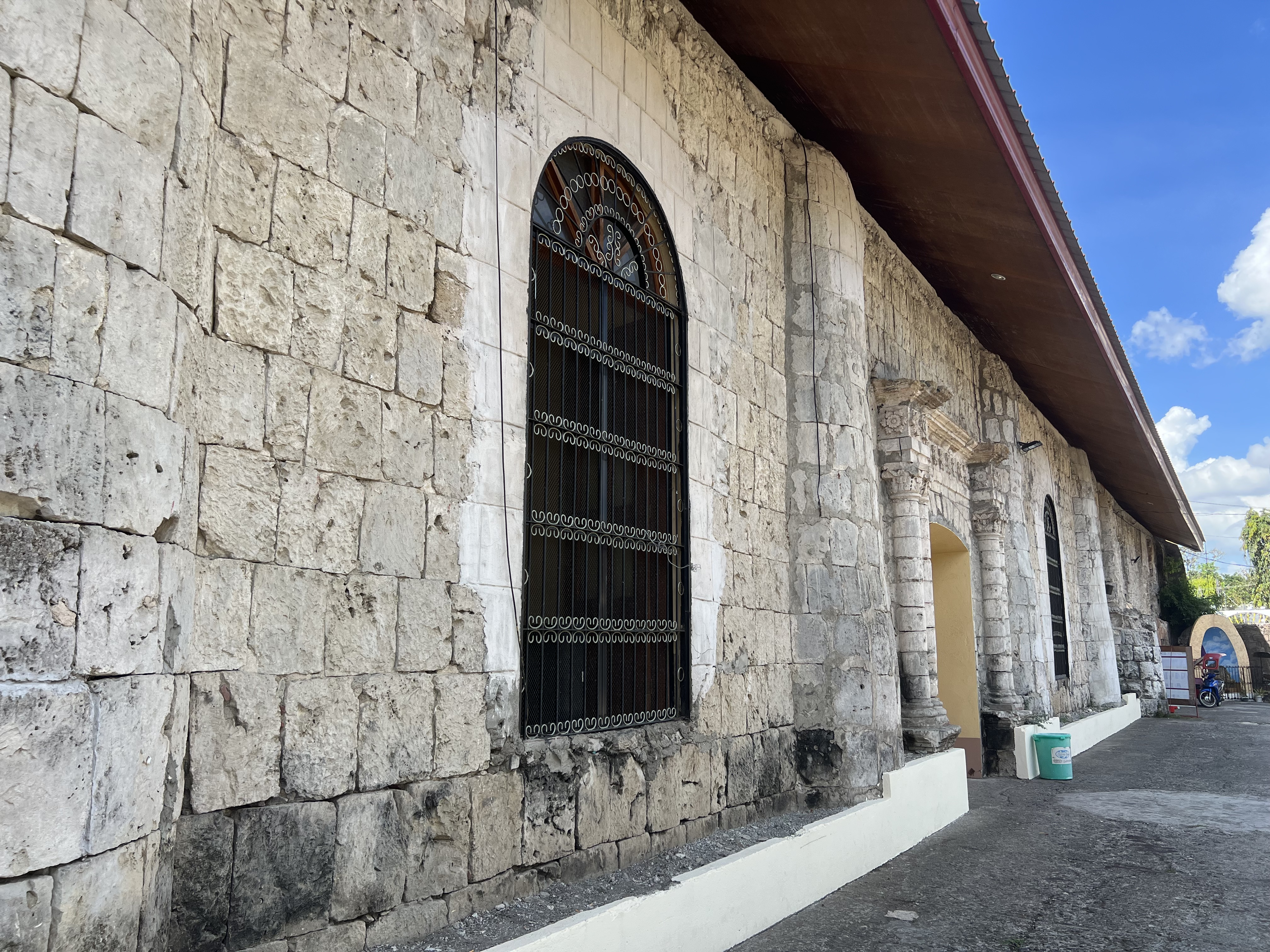
Coral stone walls

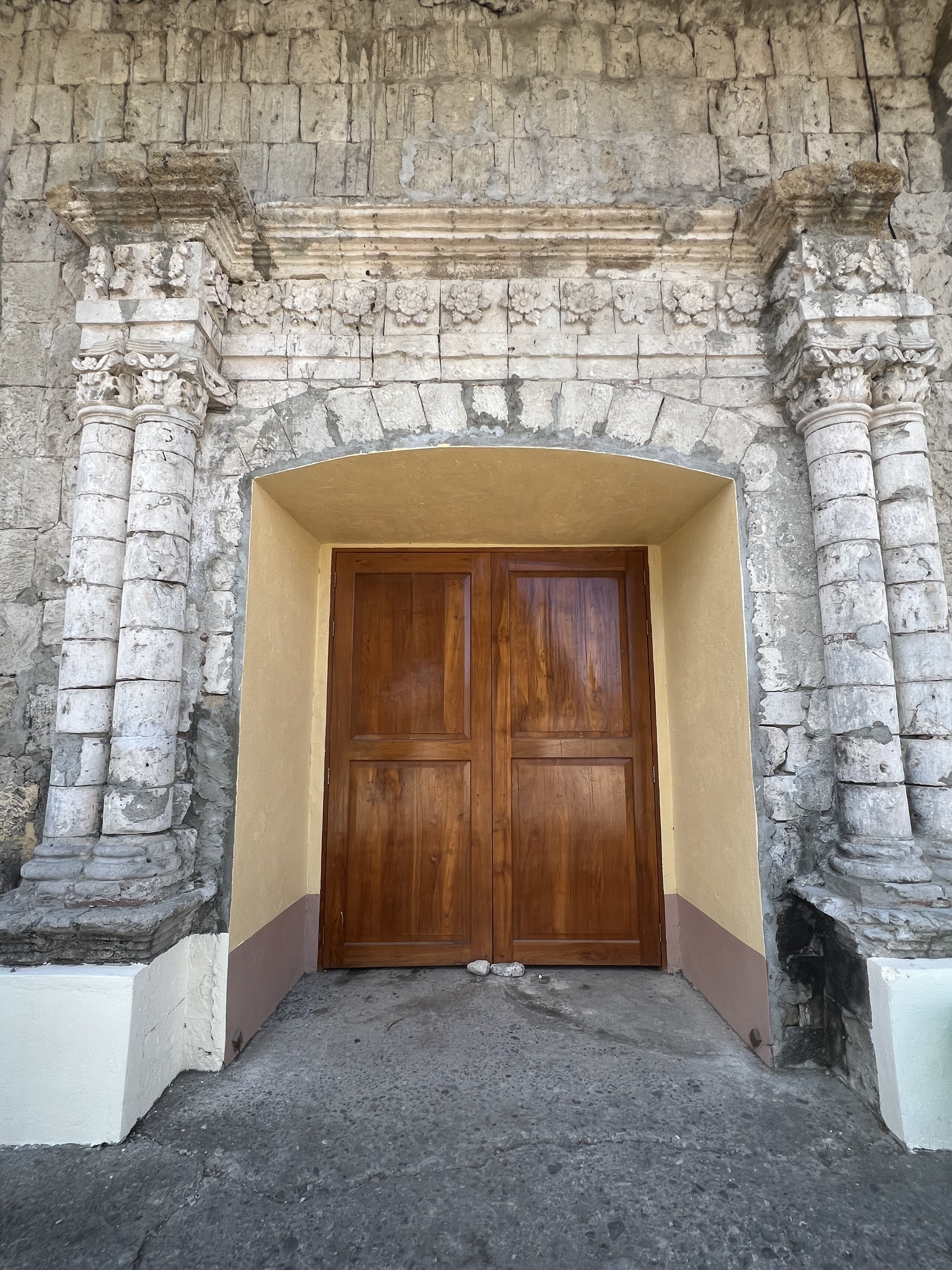
Detailed carvings on the sideways entrance

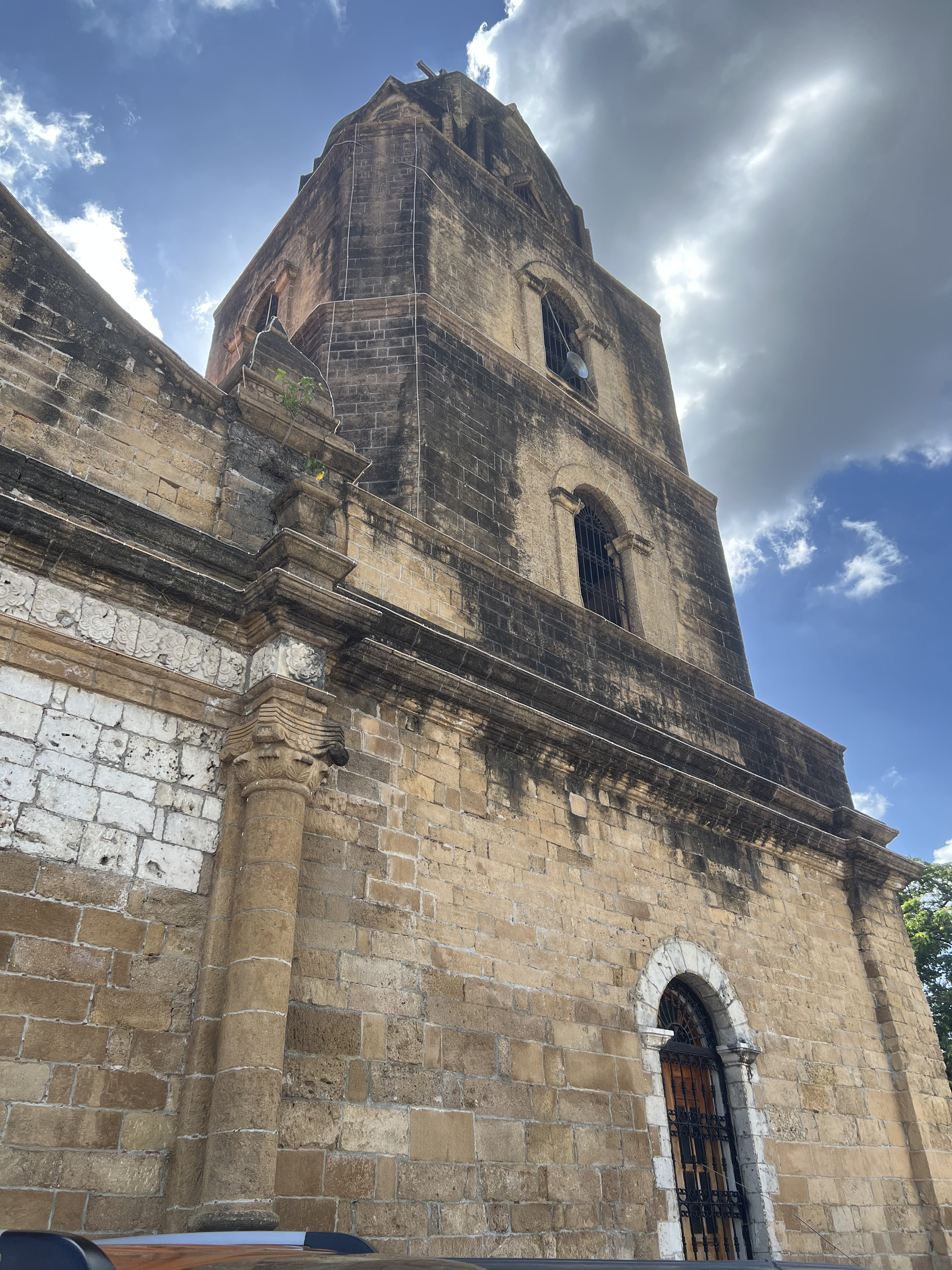
Bell tower
