= Miagao Church =

Roman Catholic church in Iloilo, Philippines

- Santo Tomás de Villanueva Parish Church
- Parokya ni Santo Tomas de Villanueva (Filipino); Parroquia de Santo Tomás de Villanueva (Spanish)
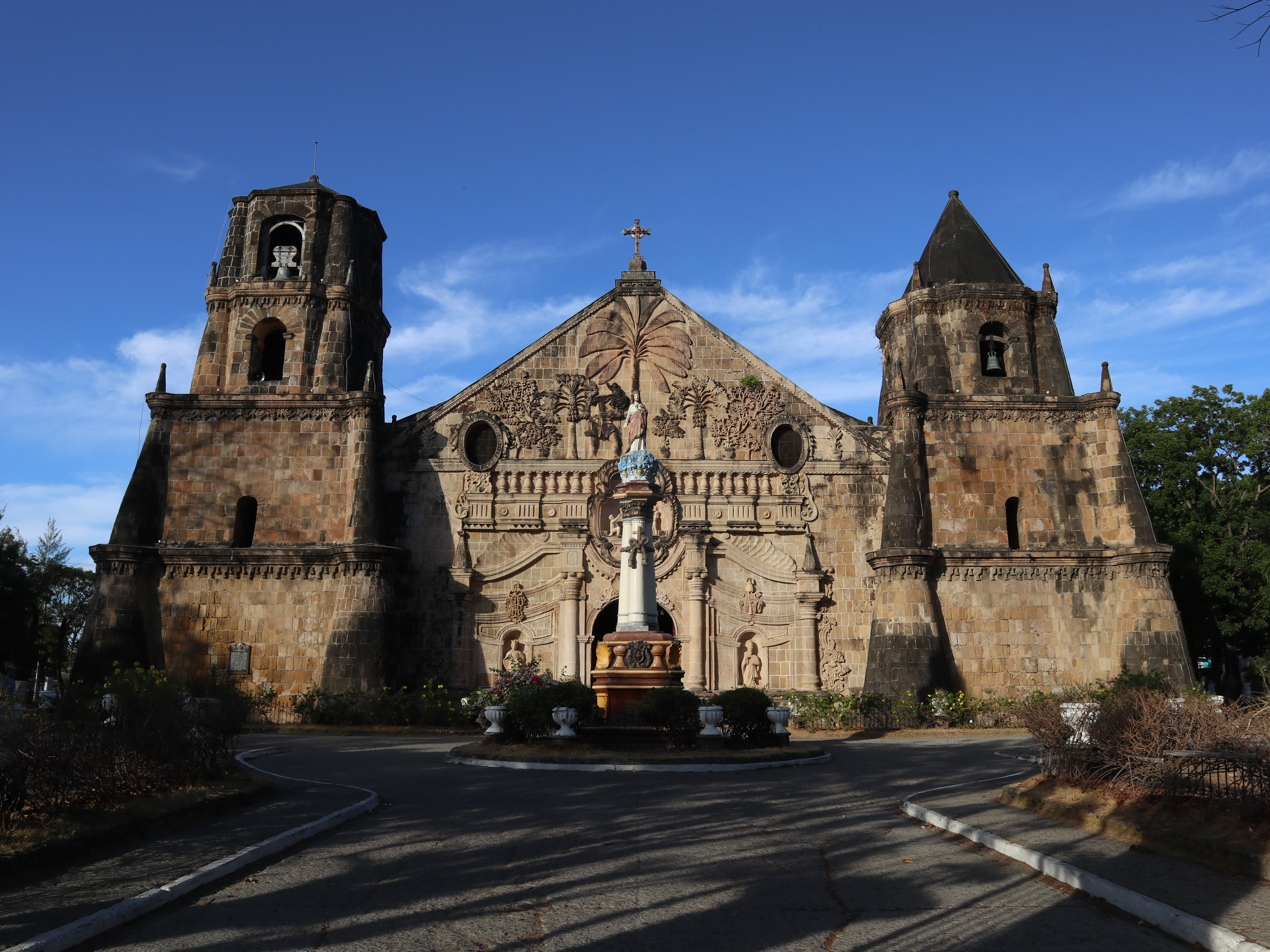
- Church facade and bell towers in April 2024

- Location in the Visayas Location in the Philippines
- 10°38′31″N 122°14′08″E
- Location: Miag-ao, Iloilo
- Country: Philippines
- Denomination: Roman Catholic

History
- Status: Parish church
- Founded: 1731; 295 years ago
- Dedication: Thomas of Villanova

Architecture
- Functional status: Active
- Heritage designation: World Heritage Site
- Designated: December 11, 1993
- Architectural type: Church building
- Style: Baroque-Romanesque
- Groundbreaking: 1787; 239 years ago
- Completed: 1797; 229 years ago

Specifications
- Materials: Adobe, Limestone, Coral

Administration
- Archdiocese: Jaro
- Deanery: Saints Philip and James
- Parish: Santo Tomás de Villanueva

Clergy
- Priest: Rev. Fr. Cirilo Camus

UNESCO World Heritage Site
- Official name: Church of Santo Tomas de Villanueva
- Part of: Baroque Churches of the Philippines
- Criteria: Cultural: (ii)(iv)
- Reference: 677bis-004
- Inscription: 1993 (17th Session)
- Extensions: 2013

National Historical Landmarks
- Official name: Miagao Church
- Designated: August 1, 1973
- Reference no.: No. 260, s. 1973

Santo Tomás de Villanueva Parish Church, commonly known as Miagao Church, is a Roman Catholic church located in Miagao, Iloilo, Philippines. It is under the jurisdiction of the Archdiocese of Jaro. The church was declared as a UNESCO World Heritage Site on December 11, 1993, together with San Agustin Church in Manila; Nuestra Señora de la Asuncion Church in Santa Maria, Ilocos Sur; and San Agustin Church in Paoay, Ilocos Norte under the collective title Baroque Churches of the Philippines, a collection of four Baroque Spanish-era churches.

== History ==
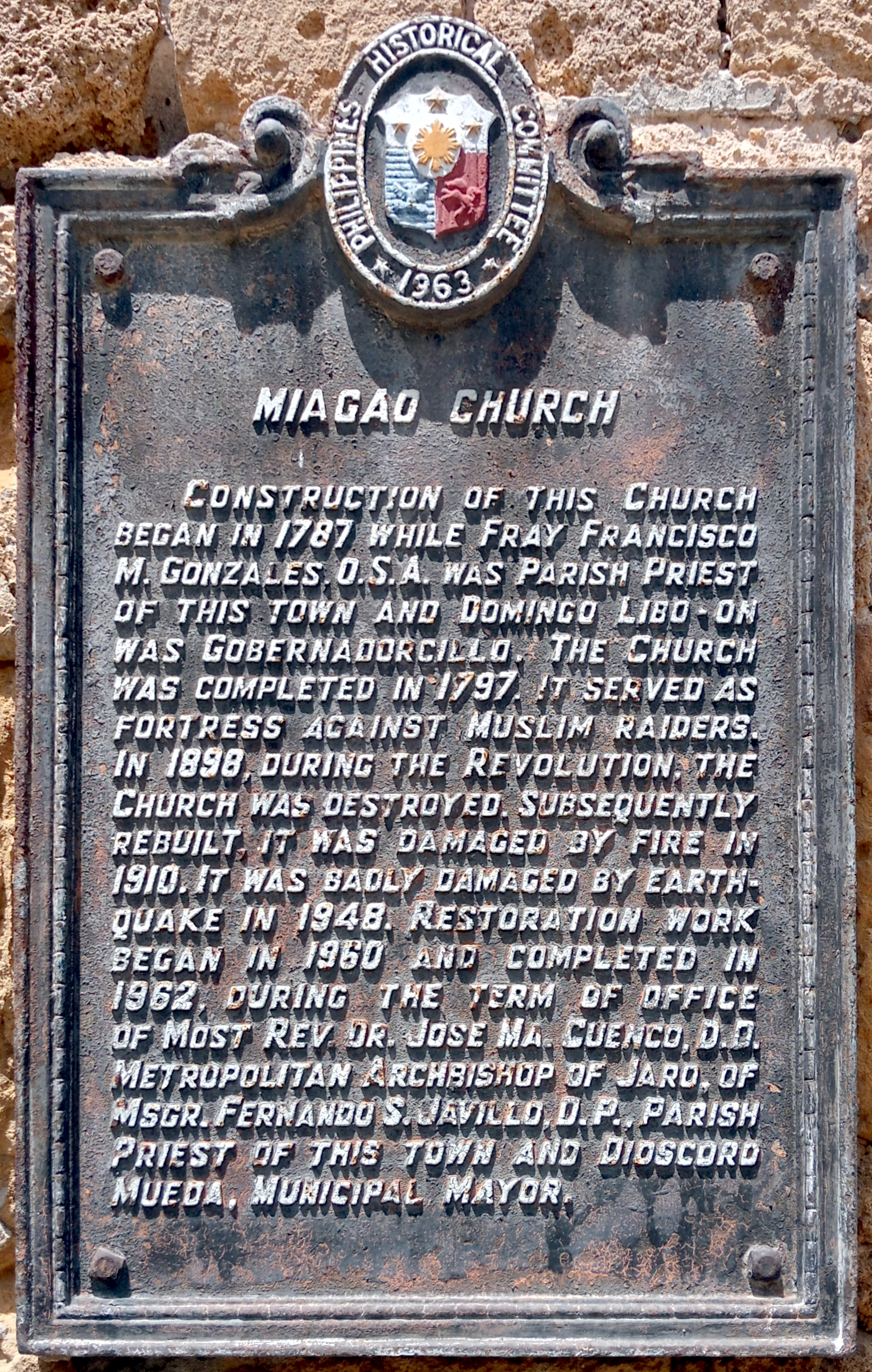
Church PHC historical marker installed in 1963

Miagao was formerly a visita (a locality served by a visiting priest) of Oton until 1580, Tigbauan until 1592, San Joaquín until 1703 and Guimbal until 1731. It became an independent parish of the Augustinians in 1731 under the advocacy of Saint Thomas of Villanova. With the establishment of the parish, a church and convent was built on land near the sea called Ubos. Father Fernando Camporredondo served as the town's first parish priest in 1734. When the town experienced frequent Moro invasion in 1741 and 1754, the town moved to a more secure place. From there, a new church was constructed in 1787 through forced labor under the supervision of Fray Francisco Gonzales, parish priest and Spanish gobernadorcillo Domingo Libo-on. It was built on the highest point of the town to guard from invaders called Tacas. After ten years, the church was completed in 1797. It was designed with thick walls to serve as protection from invaders. It was severely damaged during the Spanish revolution in 1898 but was later rebuilt, fire in 1910, the second World War and earthquake in 1948. The present church is the third structure built since its establishment in 1731. To preserve the church, it underwent restoration in 1960. This was completed in 1962. The church was declared a national historical landmark by President Ferdinand Marcos through Presidential Decree No. 260 on August 1, 1973.

== Architecture ==
The church's over-all architectural style falls under the Baroque-Romanesque and it also incorporates Mexican Tequitqui style, a syncretism of Indigenous Mexican and Spanish Christian art. The Philippines is the only country settled by Latin Americans, especially by Mexicans in Asia.

Its ochre color is due to the materials used in constructing the church: adobe, egg, coral and limestone.^{,} The church's foundation is 6 meters (20 ft) deep and the massive stone walls at 1.5 meters (4 ft 11 in) thick are intensified through the use of 4 meters (13 ft) thick setback buttresses as protection to the Moro invaders as stipulated under Royal Decree 111 of 1573 (Law of the Indies).

=== Façade ===
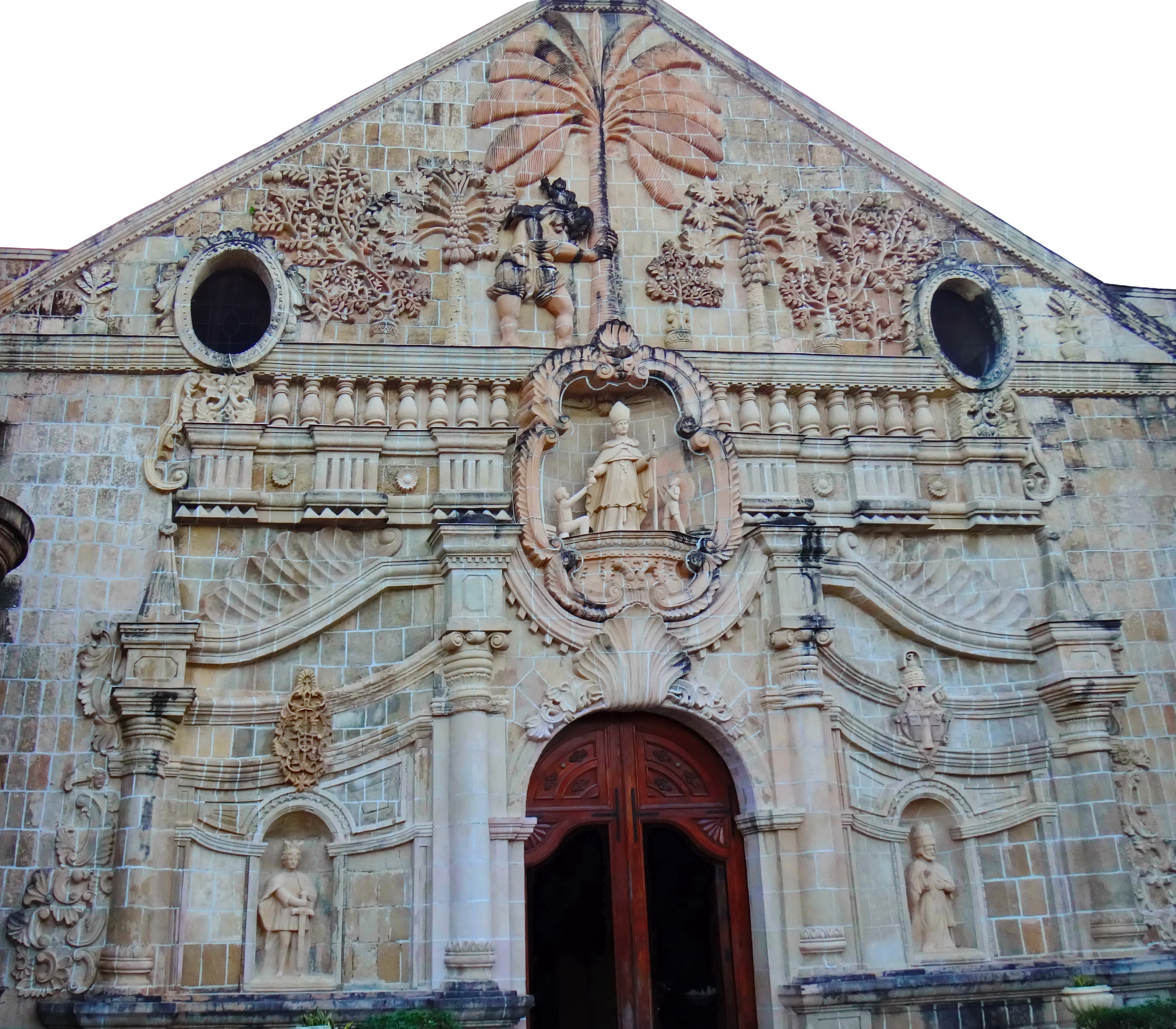
Façade detail, featuring the images of saints Thomas of Villanova (center) and Henry of Bavaria (lower left)

The façade of the church consists of an ornately decorated bas-relief in the middle of two huge watchtower belfries on each side. The bas-relief is a mixed influence of medieval Spanish, Chinese, Muslim and local traditions and elements, a unique characteristic of the church façade. A prominent part of the façade is a coconut tree depicted as the tree of life where Saint Christopher holds on. Saint Christopher is dressed in local and traditional clothing carrying the Child Jesus on his back. The rest of the façade features the daily life of the people of Miagao during that time including native flora (like papaya, coconut and palm tree) and fauna.^{,}

Above the wooden door entrance at the center of the façade just below the image of St. Christopher is a carved image of the town's patron saint, Saint Thomas of Villanueva. At each side of the door is the images of Saint Henry of Bavaria on the left and Pope Pius VI.^{,} Above the images of St. Henry and Pope Pius VI is their respective coat-of-arms.

=== Sanctuary ===
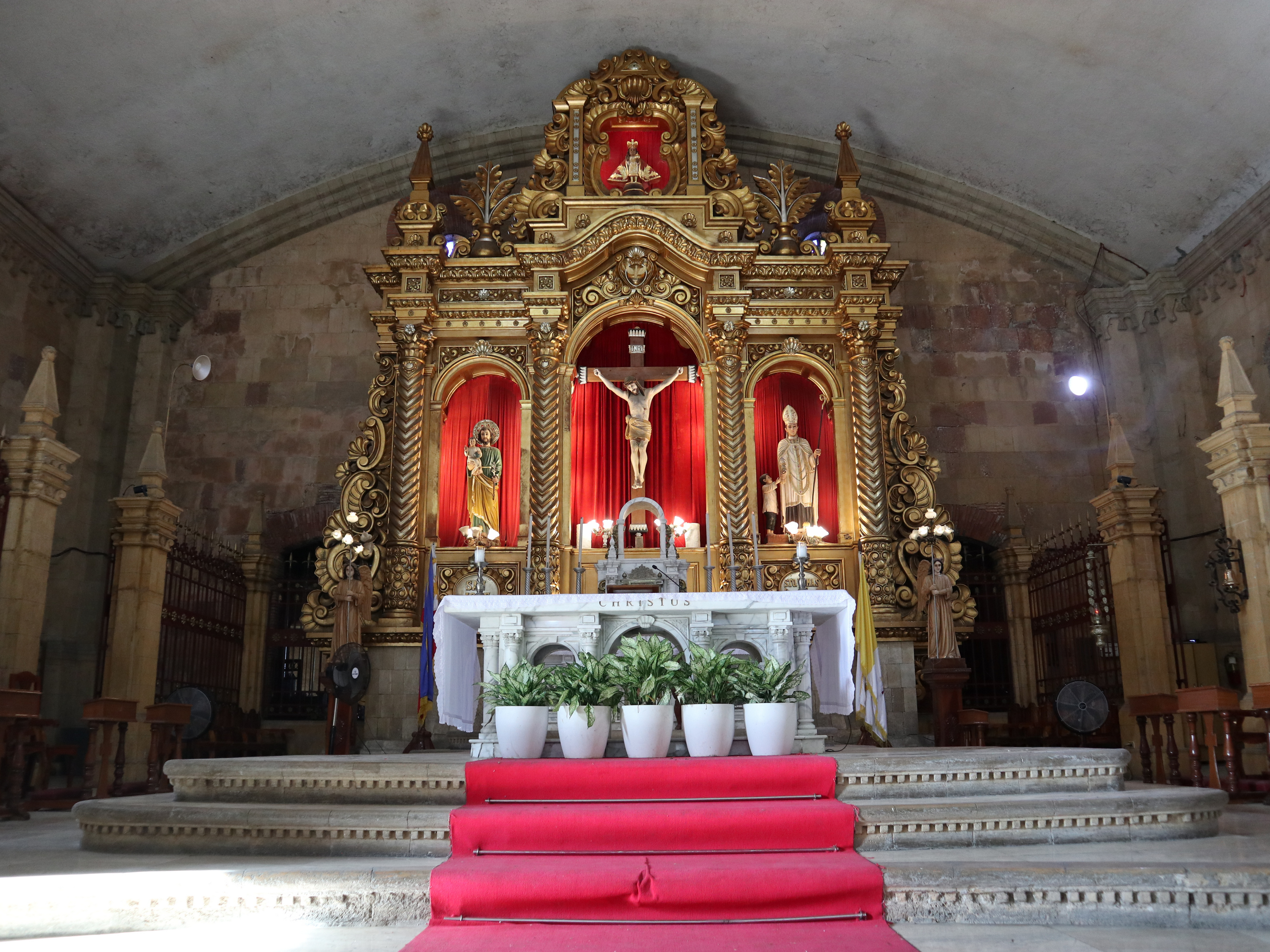
Church altar and retablo mayor

The sanctuary of the church is composed of an altar, tabernacle, retablo and shrines on both sides. The retablo is gold-plated and consists of a crucifix (center), statue of Saint Joseph (left), statue of Saint Thomas (right) and a statue of Santo Niño (top). The shrine on the left of the altar houses the Sacred Heart of Jesus while the shrine on the right of the altar houses the Immaculate Heart of Mary.

=== Belltower ===
The two huge unequal bell towers directly attached to the main church serve as watchtowers to defend the town against invasion of Moros. It has two different designs since it was commissioned by two different priests. On the left side is the older belfry, the tallest west belfry with four levels. Originally, the east belfry was constructed only with two levels. It was in 1830 when Father Francisco Perez decided to add another story to the east belfry. Until now, the east belfry (three levels) is one level shorter that the west belfry (four levels).

The original late 1790s images of Saint Tomas of Villanova can also be found enclosed in a glass case in the rear side of the church.

== Gallery ==
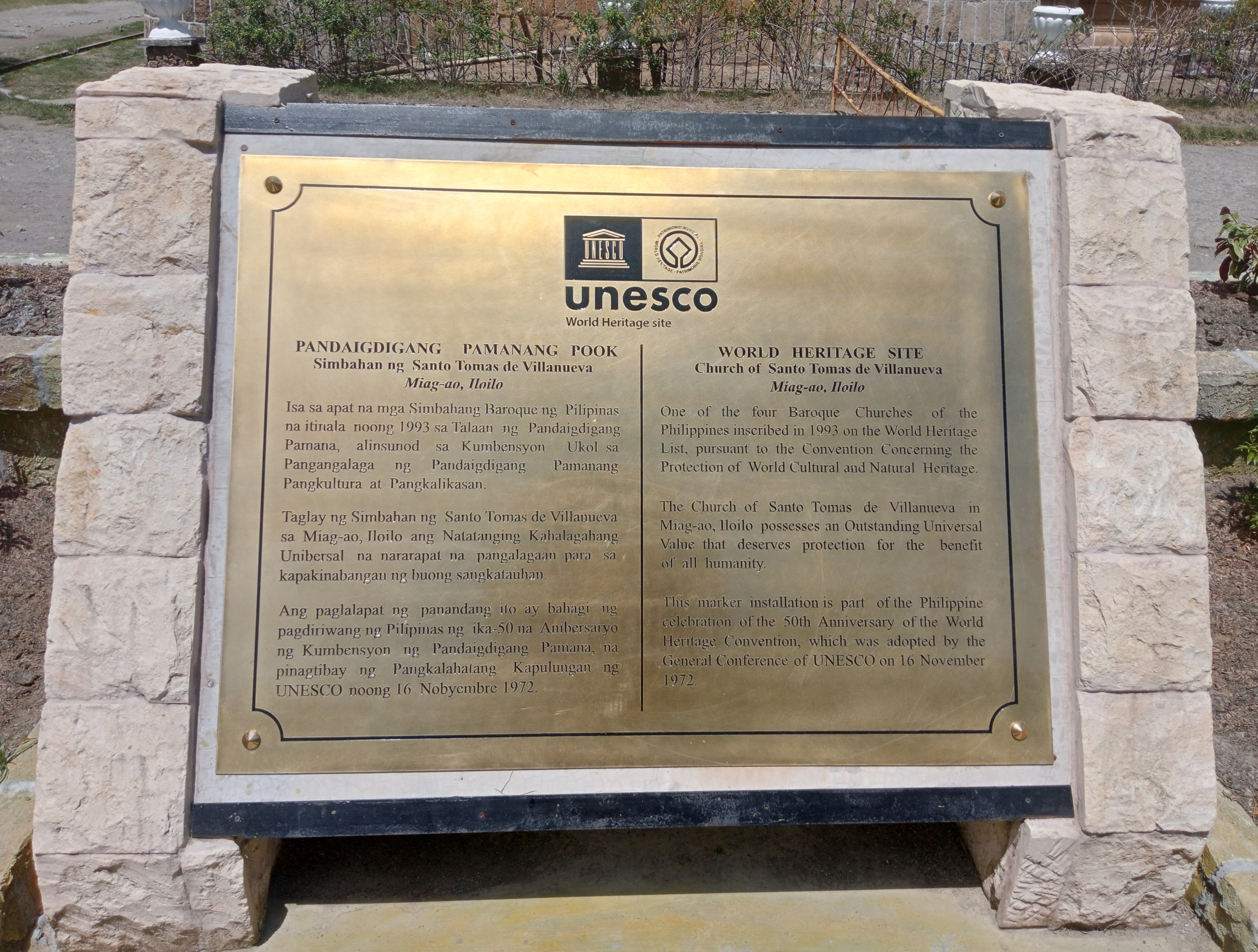
UNESCO World Heritage Site marker

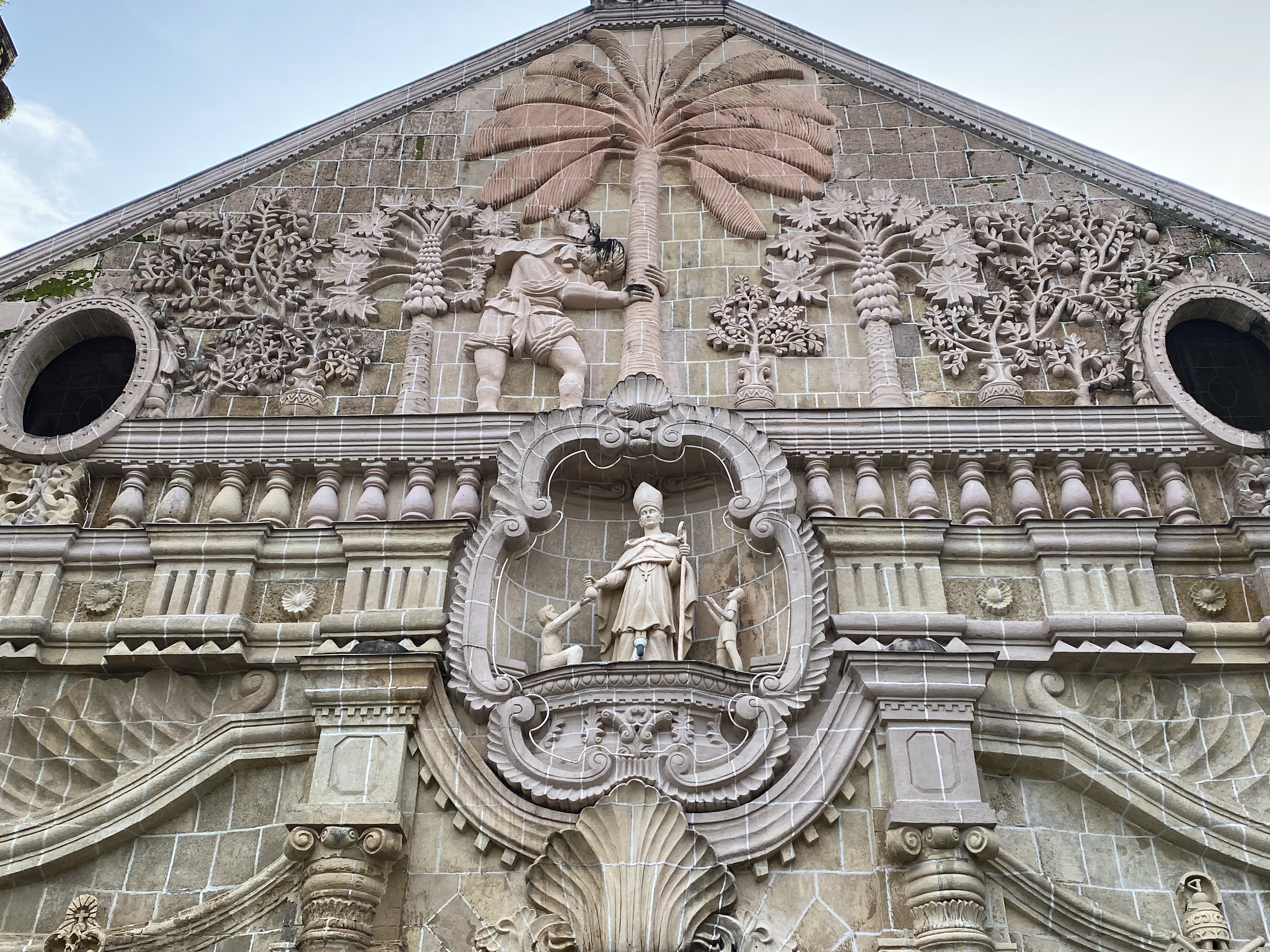
Façade and pediment detail featuring St. Thomas of Villanova (lower) and St. Christopher carrying the child Jesus on his back (upper)

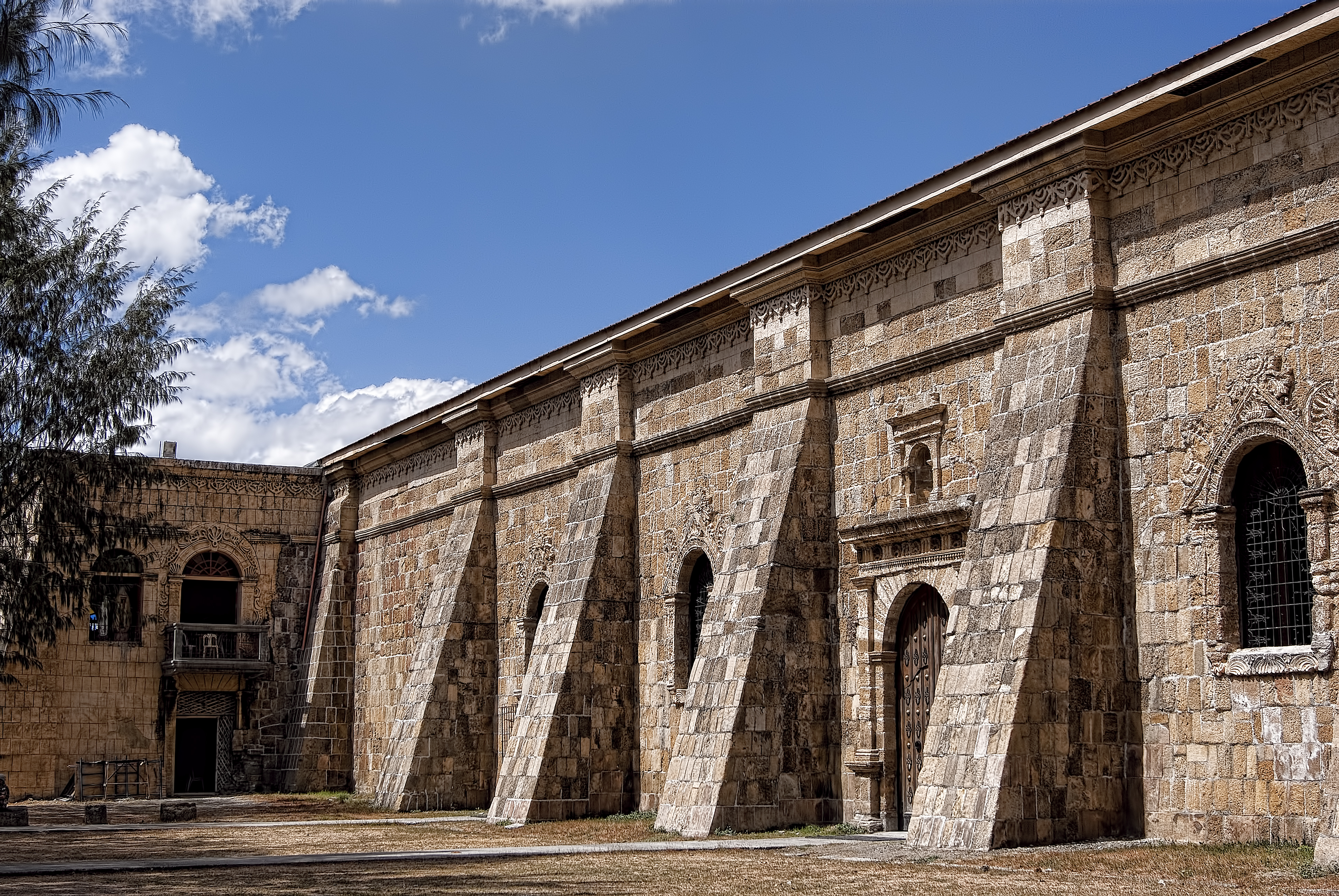
Side wall buttresses

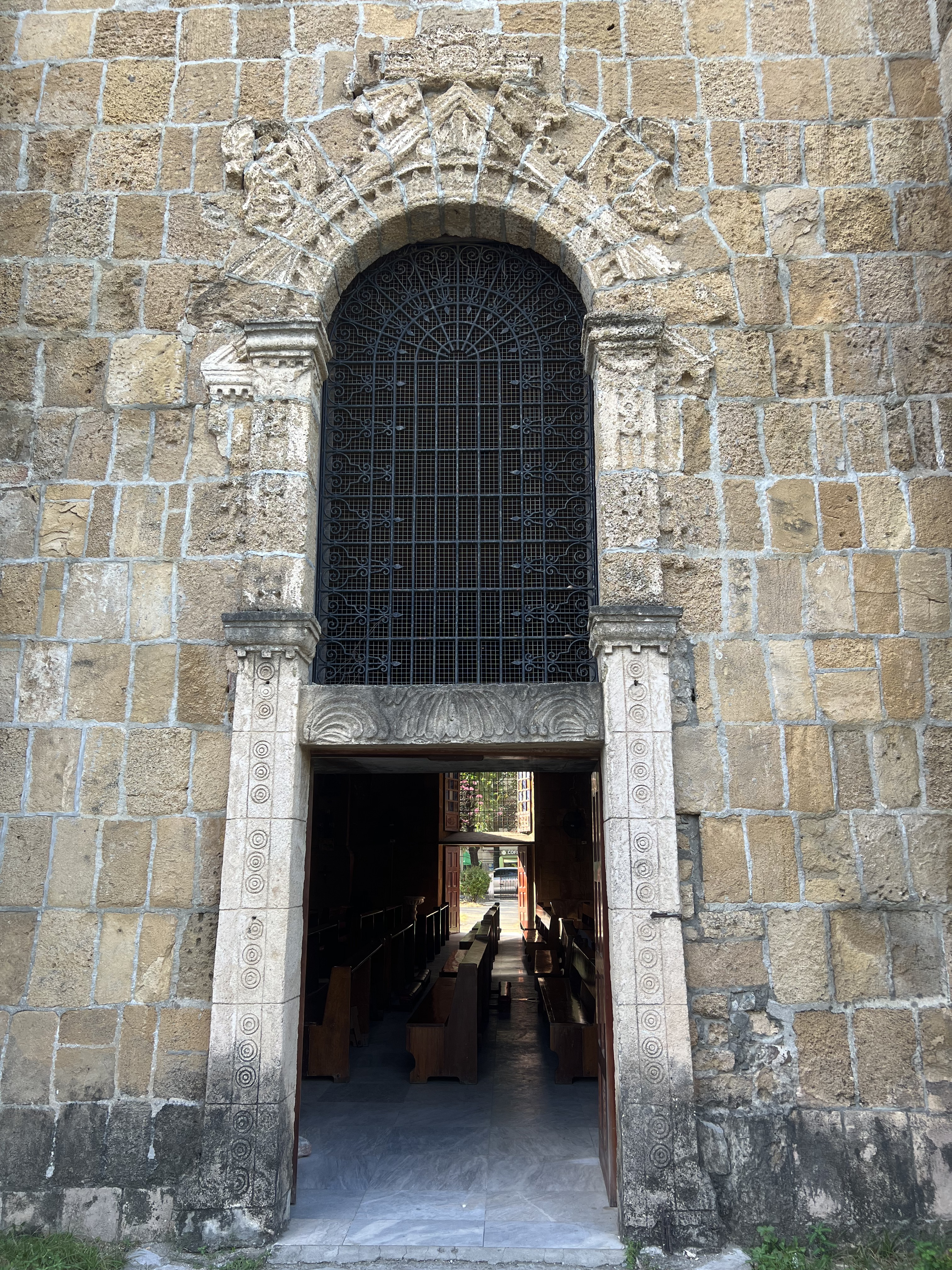
Side entrance

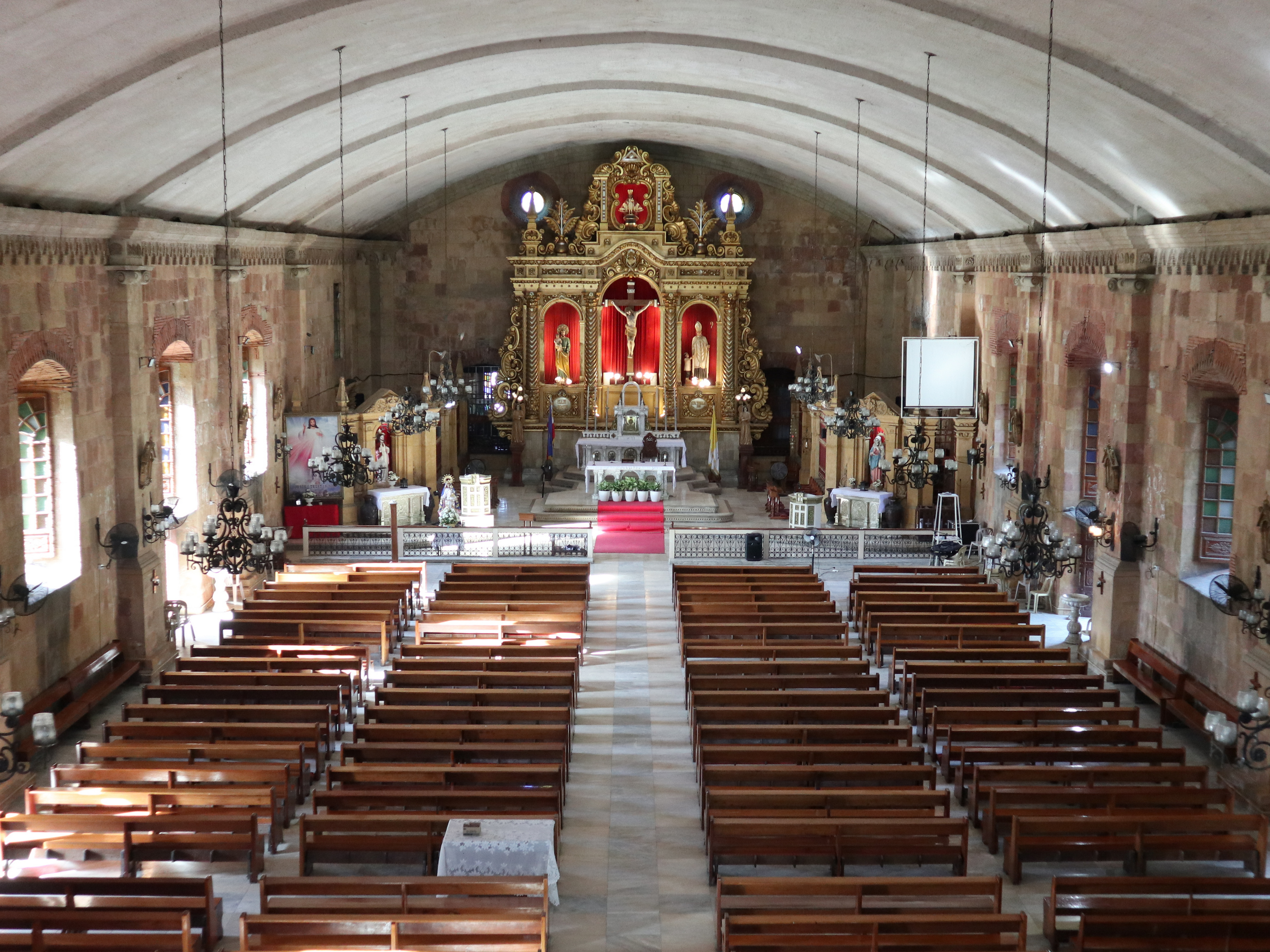
Church interior in 2022

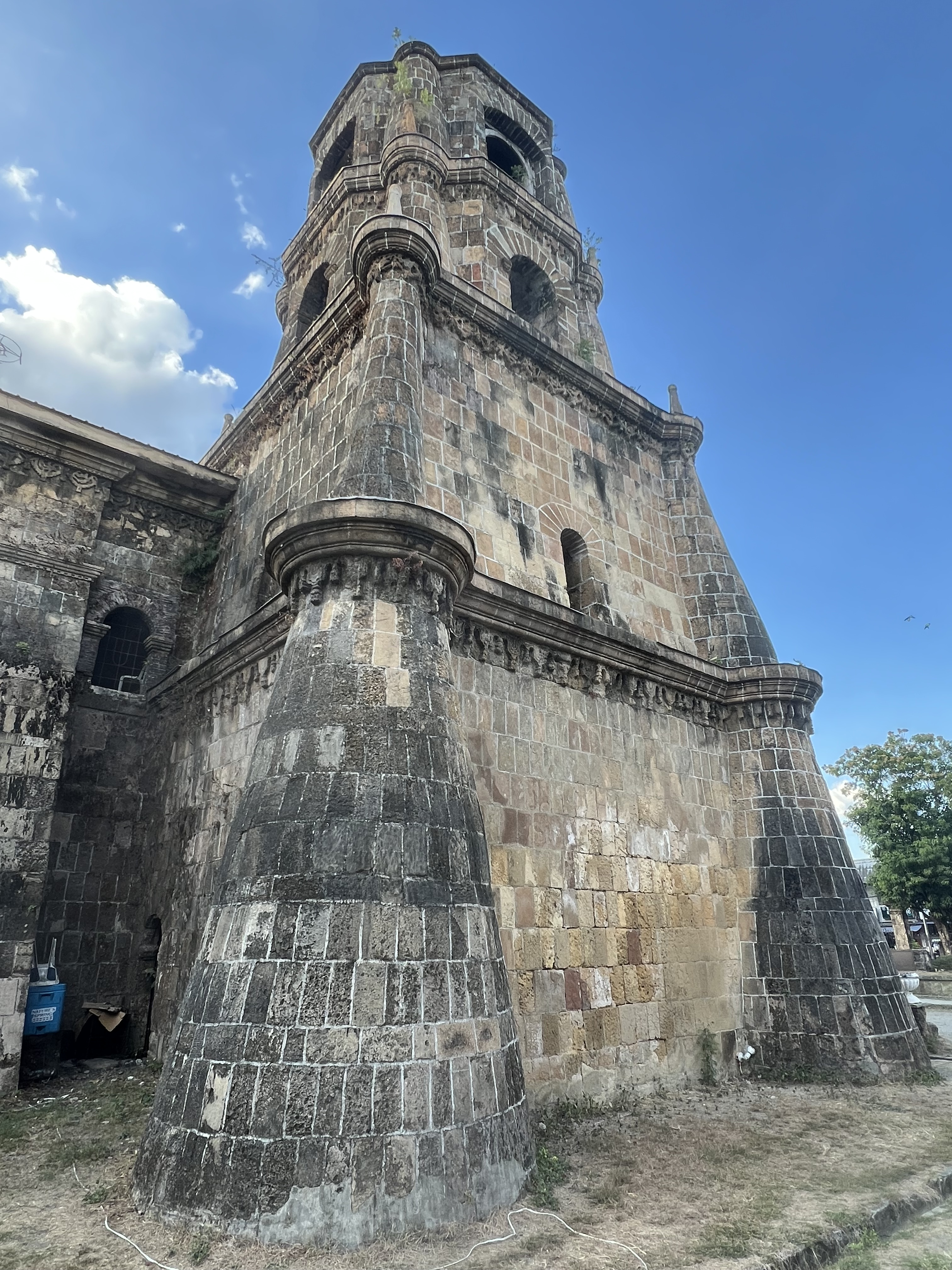
Left side bell tower with four levels
