= Tigbauan Church =

Roman Catholic church in Iloilo, Philippines

- San Juan de Sahagun Parish Church
- Simbahang Parokyal ni San Juan ng Sahagun (Filipino); Iglesia Parroquial de San Juan de Sahagún (Spanish)
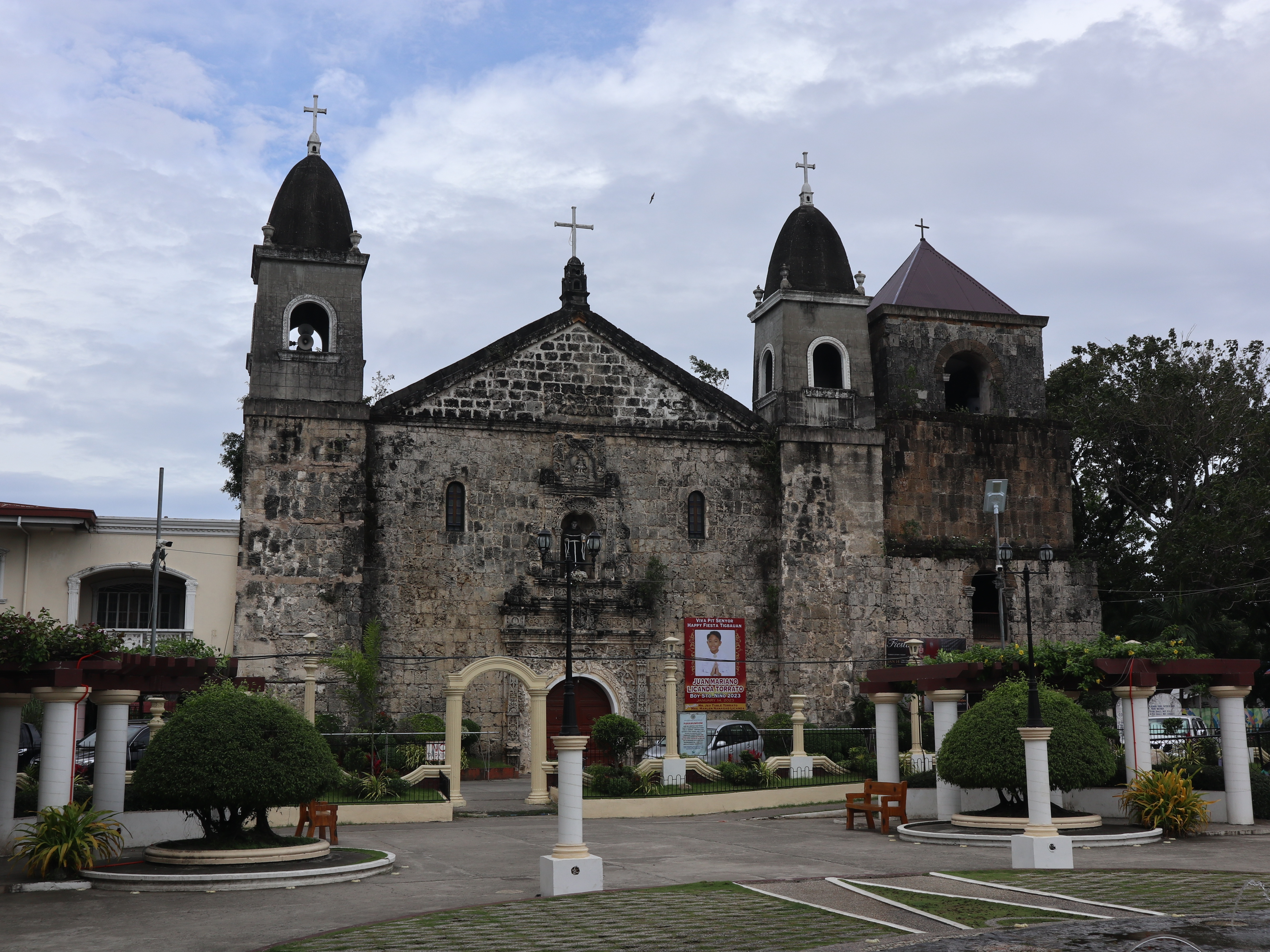
- Church façade in January 2023

- Location in the Visayas Location in the Philippines
- 10°40′26″N 122°22′32″E
- Location: Tigbauan, Iloilo
- Country: Philippines
- Denomination: Roman Catholic

History
- Status: Parish
- Founded: 1575; 451 years ago
- Dedication: John of Sahagún; Santo Niño

Architecture
- Functional status: Active
- Heritage designation: National Cultural Treasure
- Designated: June 27, 2019
- Architect(s): Fr. Florencio Martin, O.S.A
- Architectural type: Church building
- Style: Churrigueresque
- Completed: 1867; 159 years ago

Specifications
- Materials: Coral stones

Administration
- Archdiocese: Jaro
- Deanery: Saint John

The San Juan de Sahagun Parish Church, commonly known as Tigbauan Church, is a Roman Catholic parish church located at the municipality of Tigbauan, Iloilo in the Philippines. It is a Churrigueresque-style church and is under the jurisdiction of the Archdiocese of Jaro.

== History ==
Tigbauan Church, originally a visita of the Immaculate Conception Parish in Oton, was founded in 1575, making it the second church established by the Augustinian mission in Panay. It was initially under the patronage of Our Lady of Grace, but later, Saint John of Sahagun—an Augustinian friar known for his preaching and efforts in promoting peace—was chosen as the patron.

Although founded in 1575, the parish did not have a priest until 1580, when Fr. Luis de Montoya was assigned, followed by Fr. Alonso de Castro in 1581. A historical marker from the National Historical Institute states the parish was officially founded in 1580.

The Augustinians left the parish years later due to a shortage of friars. In 1593, secular clergy took over the administration and remained in charge until 1617. The Jesuits later arrived in 1592 at the invitation of the encomendero Esteban Rodriguez de Figueroa, establishing the first school and dormitory that offered religious and academic instruction to local children.

The present colonial church in Tigbauan was built by Fr. Fernando Martin in 1867, possibly replacing an earlier church constructed by Fr. Fernando Camporedondo with yellow limestone, which reportedly survived the 1787 earthquake. However, the church sustained significant damage during the 1948 Lady Caycay Earthquake, which also destroyed Oton Church.

== Architecture ==
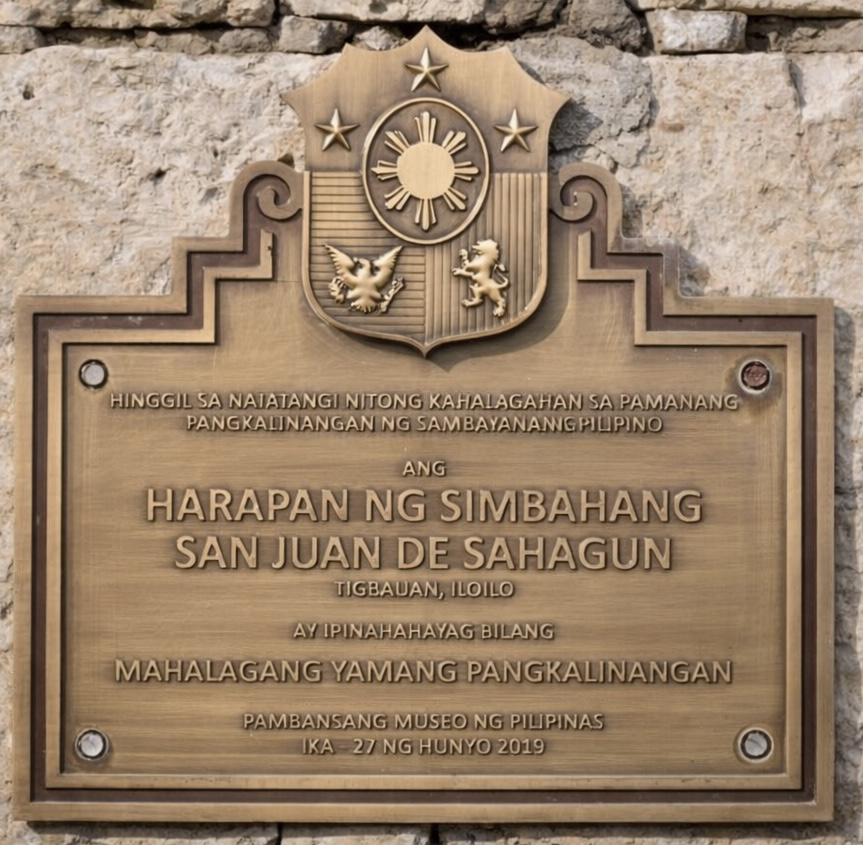
Church's ICP marker installed in 2019 by the National Museum of the Philippines.

The church retains the façade and bell tower of the original colonial church, though mosaics depicting the Stations of the Cross and the retablo were added in 1994. The bell towers on the roof were also constructed in more recent times.

Built in the Churrigueresque style—an ornate Spanish architectural trend of the 18th century—the church features a plain front wall, with an explosion of intricate stone carvings along the middle section. The facade is bordered by a simple pediment and thick pillars on either side, with bell towers made of concrete that are crowned with cupolas and crosses.

A stout church tower is positioned on the epistle side, topped with a red roof. The pediment displays an elaborate finial with loudspeakers and a cross, and it is adorned with an emblem decorated with tassels and foliage in high relief.

The main facade features two arched windows on either side of a high-relief image of Santo Niño, with a niche dedicated to the church’s patron, Saint John of Sahagun. The niche’s decorative borders include an intricate blend of scrollwork, foliage, volutes, and pilasters. Below the niche is the Augustinian seal, placed just above the entrance door. The church’s stone wall is rich in detailed carvings, including the bust of a putto, which serves as an ornamental capstone above the arched entryway.

On June 27, 2019, the National Museum of the Philippines declared the church's facade as an Important Cultural Property.

== Gallery ==
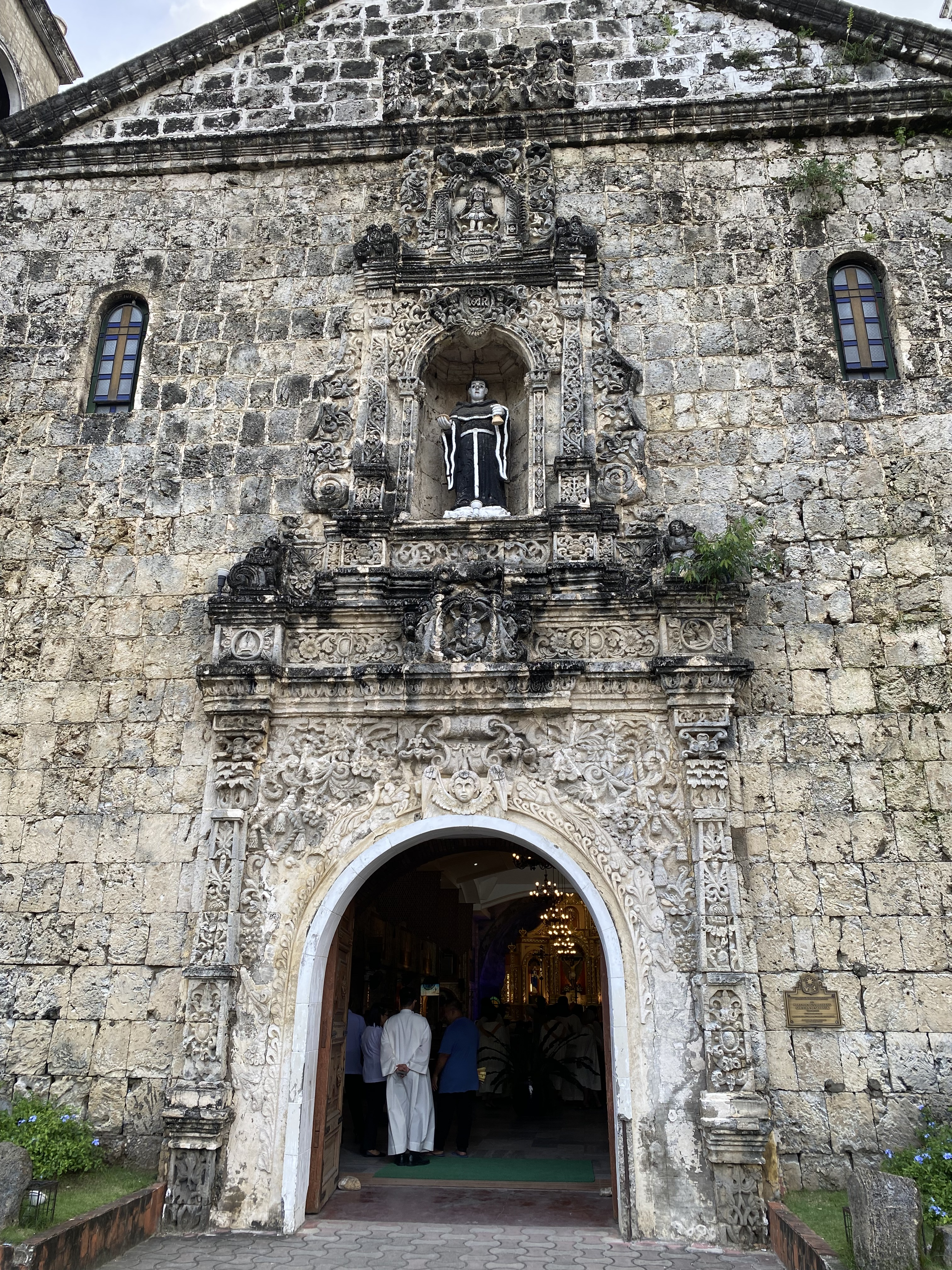
Façade, featuring St. John of Sahagun on the niche

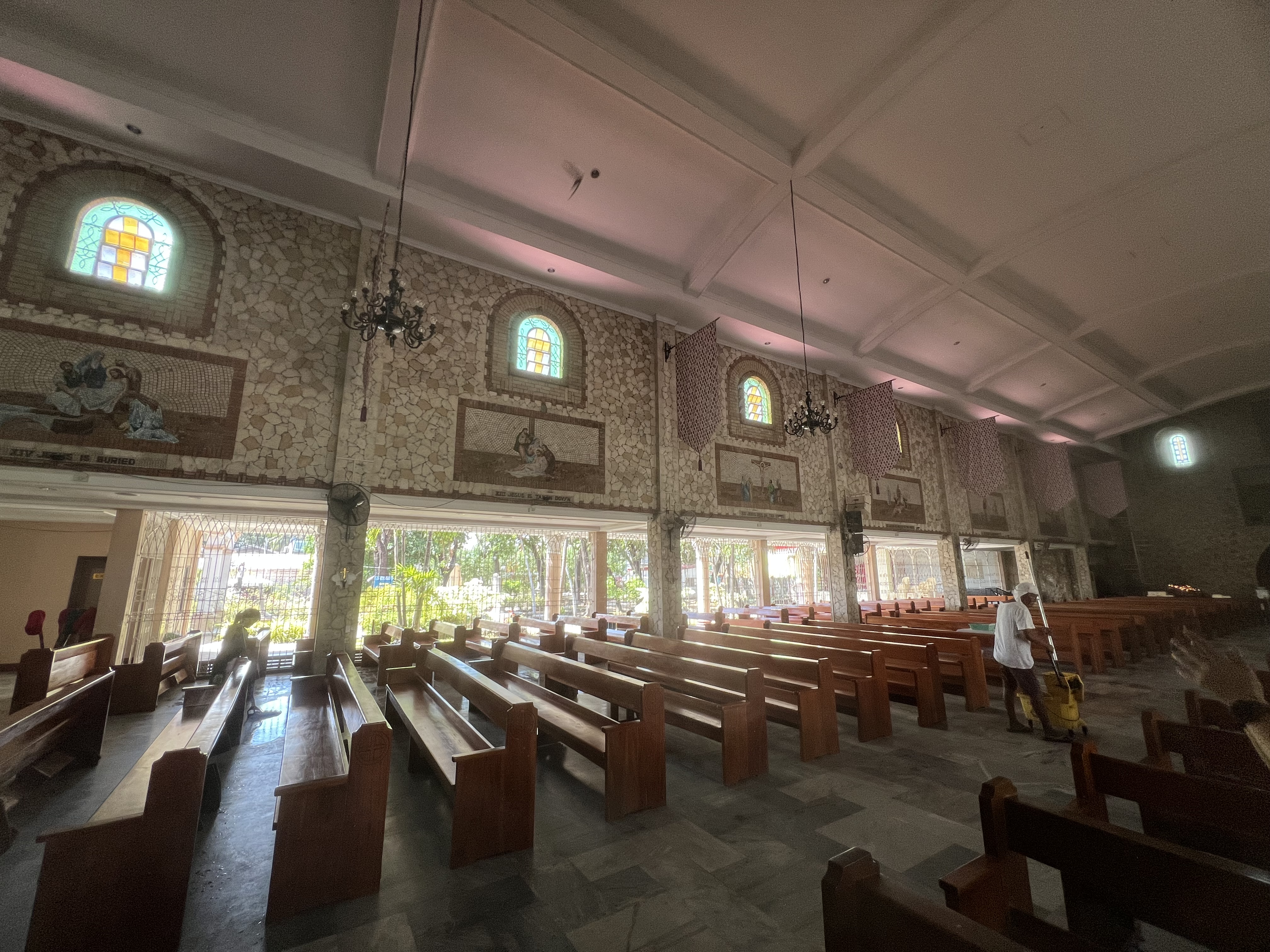
Nave with Stations of the Cross done in mosaic

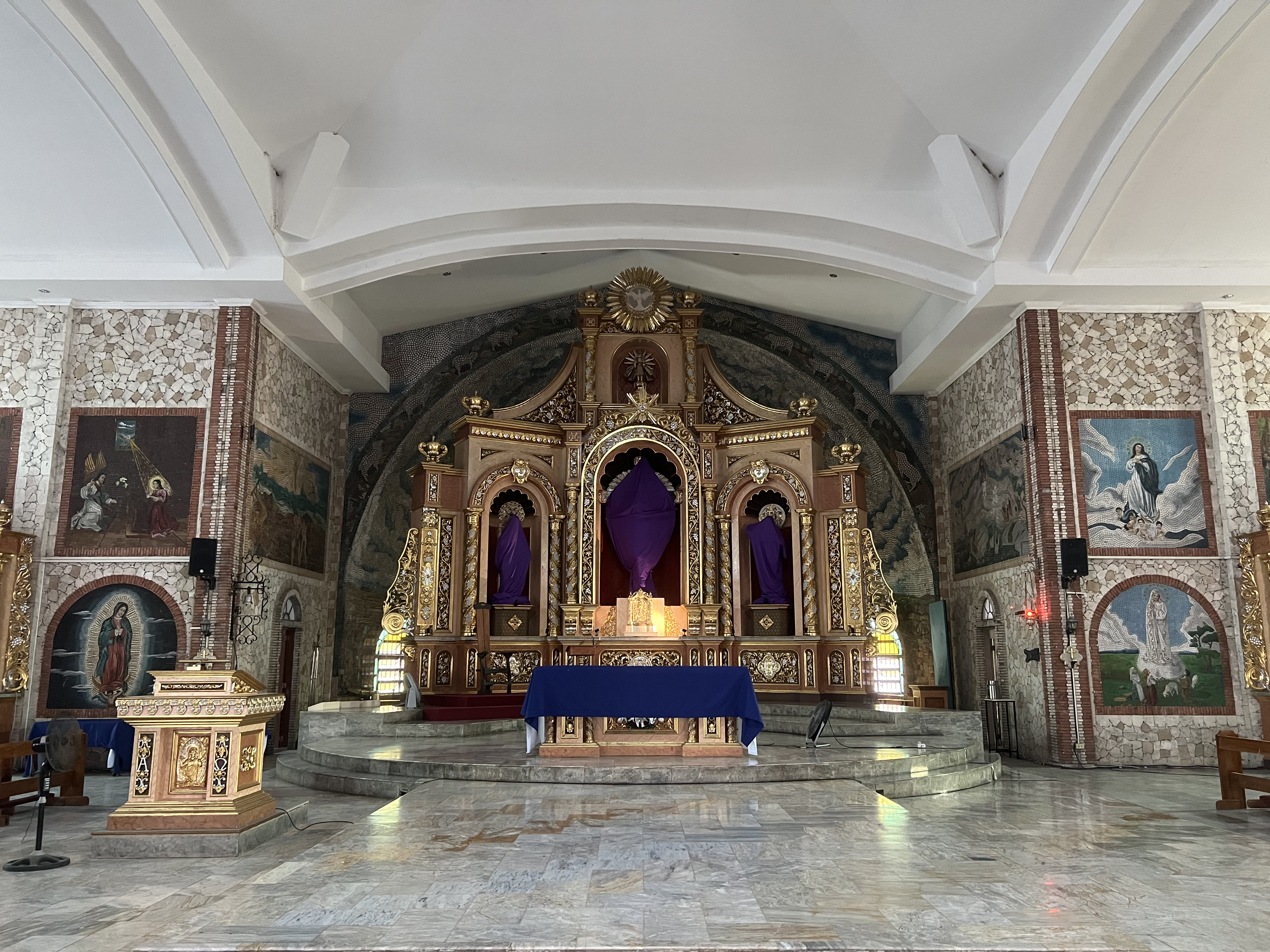
Central altar

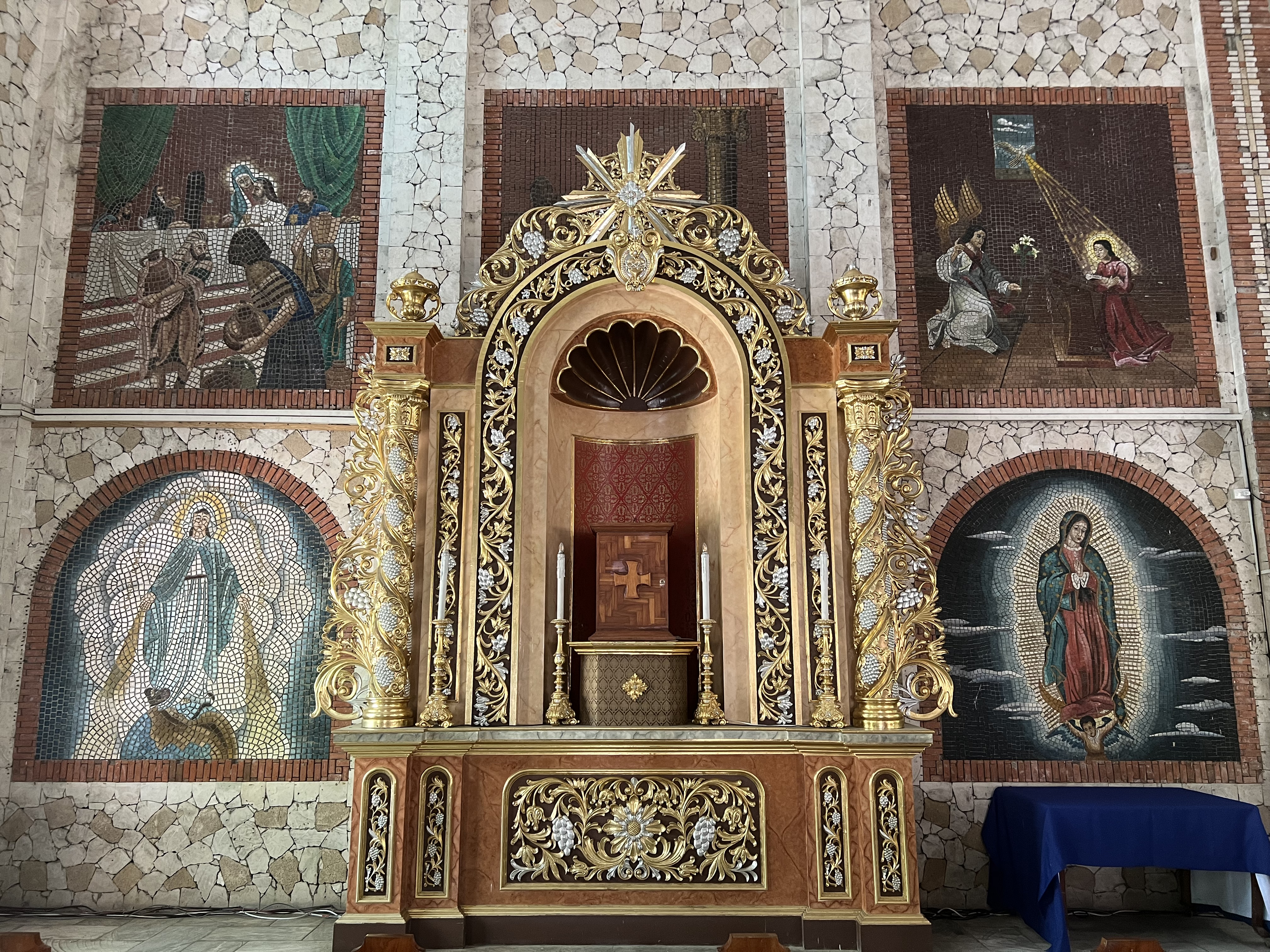
Left side altar
