= Oton =

Municipality in Iloilo, Philippines

Oton Ogtong
- Municipality
- Municipality of Oton
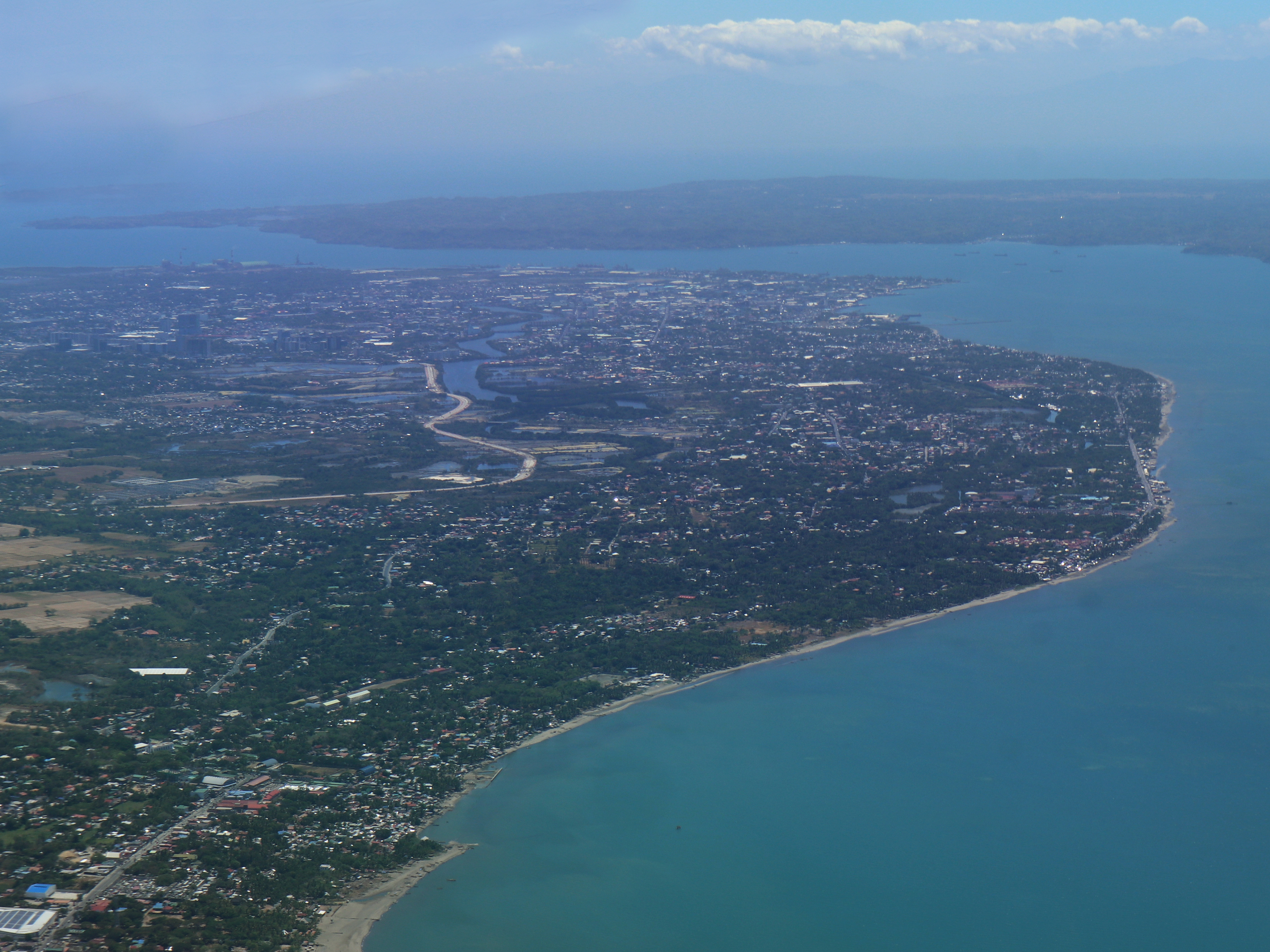
- Aerial view of Oton

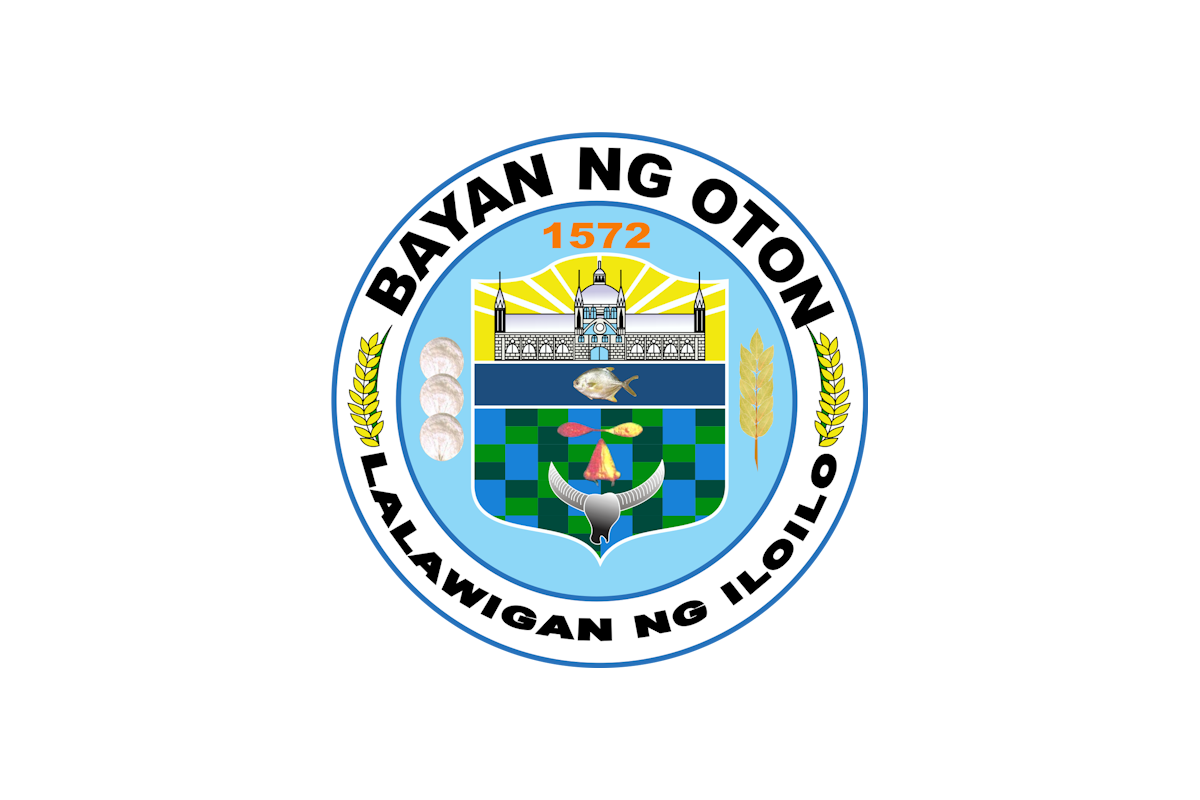
- Flag Seal
- Nickname: Second oldest Spanish settlement in the Philippines
- Motto: Ang pamatasan labaw sa bulawan
- Anthem: Oton Municipal Hymn
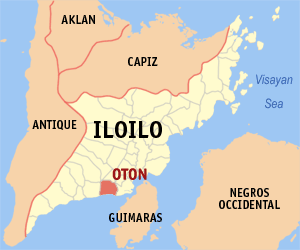
- Map of Iloilo with Oton highlighted
- Interactive map of Oton
- Location within the Philippines
- Coordinates: 10°41′35″N 122°28′25″E
- Country: Philippines
- Region: Western Visayas
- Province: Iloilo
- District: 1st district
- Founded: 1566
- Formal town establishment: May 3, 1572
- Barangays: 37 (see Barangays)

Government
  - Type: Sangguniang Bayan
  - Mayor: Sofronio L. Fusin, Jr. (Nacionalista)
  - Vice Mayor: Jose Neil P. Olivares (Nacionalista)
  - Representative: Janette L. Garin (Lakas)
  - Municipal Council: Members: Annie Rose D. Paro (Lakas); Dennis Q. Geroche (Nacionalista); Jimmy R. Olivares (Nacionalista); Dell C. Hosillos (Nacionalista); Miguel Evaristo L. Flores, Jr. (Lakas); Ma. Lorna T. Geonigo (Ind); Josephus Ambrosius Renatus T. Escanlar (Lakas); Rodolfo Z. Alconga, Jr. (Lakas); Paul M. Buenafe ^{‡}; Hyacinth C. Gardose ^{◌}; ‡ ex officio ABC president; ◌ ex officio SK chairman
  - Electorate: 54,996 voters (2025)

Area
  - Total: 86.44 km^{2} (33.37 sq mi)
- Elevation: 15 m (49 ft)
- Highest elevation: 147 m (482 ft)
- Lowest elevation: 0 m (0 ft)

Population (2024 census)
  - Total: 99,920
  - Density: 1,156/km^{2} (2,994/sq mi)
  - Households: 24,583
- Demonym: Ogtonganon

Economy
  - Income class: 1st municipal income class
  - Poverty incidence: 5.89% (2023)
  - Revenue: ₱ 407.2 million (2024)
  - Assets: ₱ 1,272 million (2024)
  - Expenditure: ₱ 150 million (2024)
  - Liabilities: ₱ 264.5 million (2024)

Service provider
  - Electricity: Iloilo 1 Electric Cooperative (ILECO 1)
- Time zone: UTC+8 (PST)
- ZIP code: 5020
- PSGC: 0603034000
- IDD : area code: +63 (0)33
- Native languages: Karay-a; Hiligaynon; Tagalog
- Website: www.oton.gov.ph

Oton, officially the Municipality of Oton ([oˈton]; Kinaray-a: Banwa kang Oton, Hiligaynon: Banwa sang Oton, Tagalog: Bayan ng Oton), is a municipality in the province of Iloilo, Philippines. According to the 2024 census, it has a population of 99,920 people, making it as the most populous town in the province and the entire Panay island. Oton is 11 kilometres (6.8 mi) west of Iloilo City and is part of the Metro Iloilo–Guimaras area.

The town is the second oldest Spanish settlement in the Philippines after Cebu. It was founded in 1572 and later became the capital of the islands of Panay, Guimaras, Negros, Tablas, Sibuyan, and Romblon. Oton used to be the home of the gigantic-megalithic Old Oton Church, the grandest of all church complexes in the Visayas. The church and convent were damaged in 1948 and later demolished and replaced by an inferior structure, leading to the town's decline in religious importance. There have been calls for the full authentic restoration of the Old Oton Church Complex.

== History ==
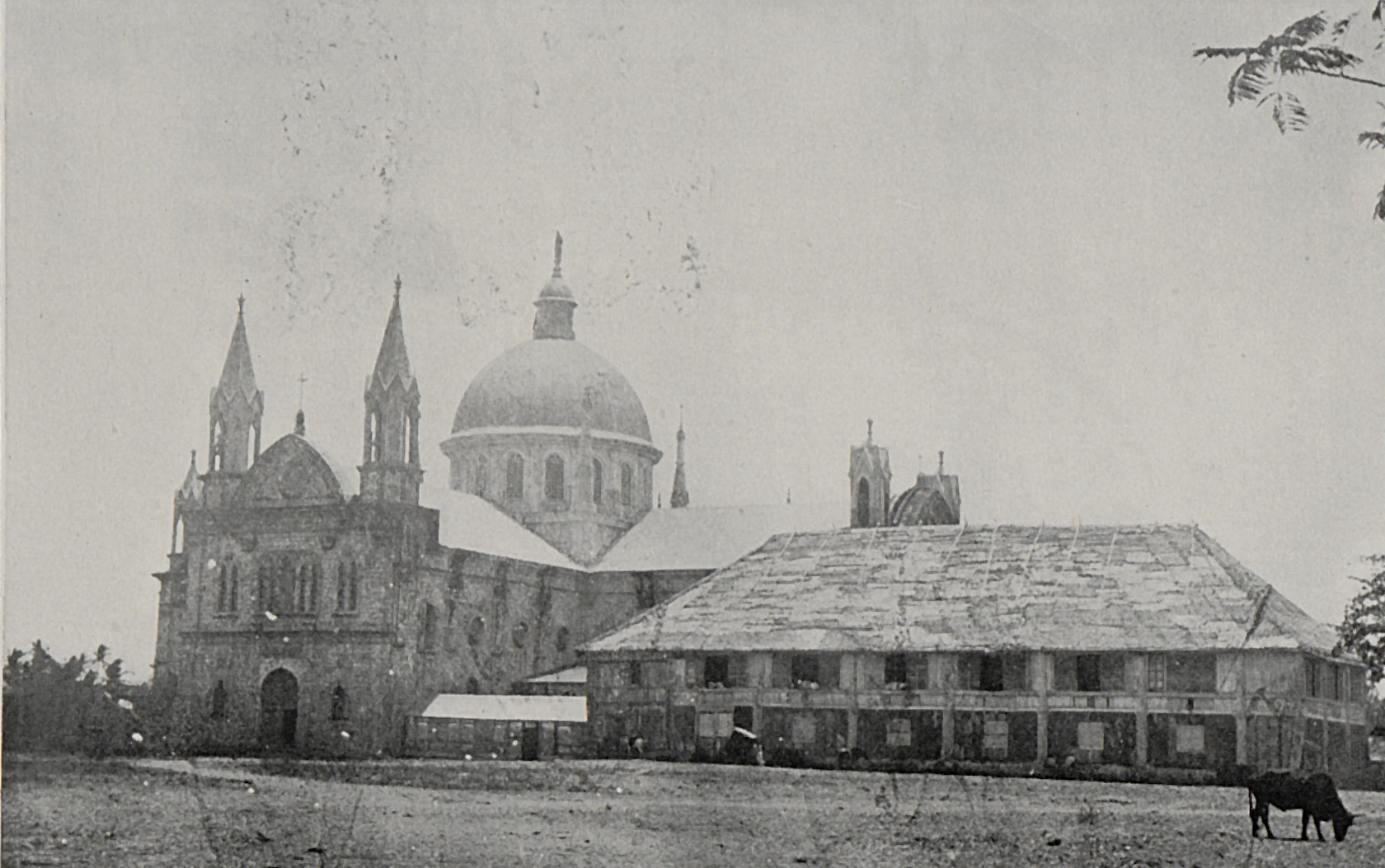
Old Oton Church, destroyed in the 1948 Lady Caycay earthquake, pictured in (1901)

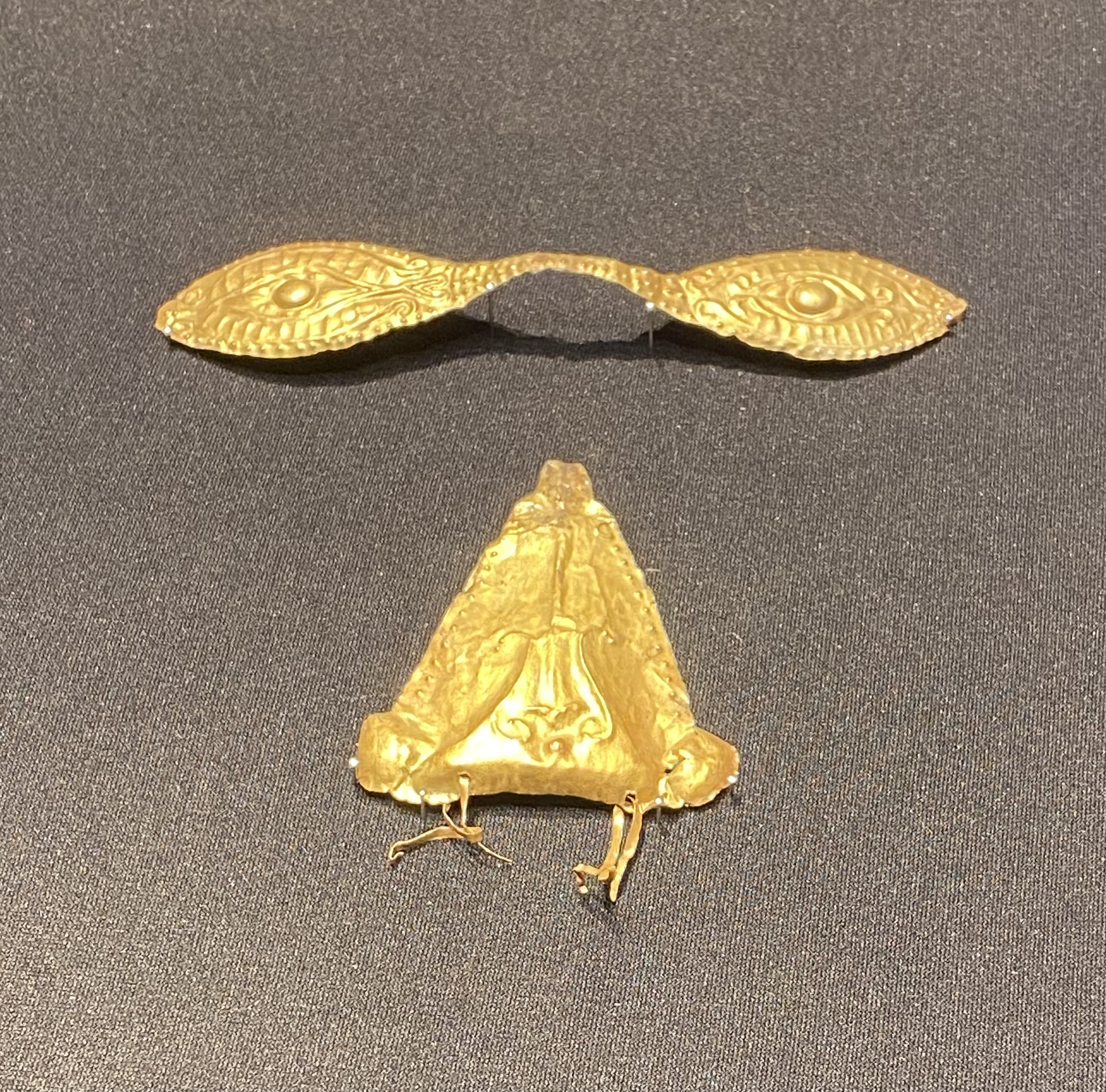
The Oton Death Mask, as exhibited in the National Museum of the Philippines - Western Visayas

Oton, formerly known as Ogtong, has a rich history dating back to the settlement of Malays in the area. Evidence of this early settlement includes the discovery of a gold death mask in Barangay San Antonio during the 1960s. During the 12th Century then Hindu Brunei formerly called Pon-i invaded Oton (Yachen 啞陳), Hokkien Chinese: 啞陳; Pe̍h-ōe-jī: A-tân, as recorded in the book of Nanhai Zhi, "Pon-i", also invaded Malilu 麻裏蘆 (claimed by various scholars to be the present-day Manila) as it also administered Sarawak and Sabah, as well as the Philippine kingdoms of: Butuan, Sulu, Ma-i (Mindoro or Laguna), Shahuchong 沙胡重 (present-day Zamboanga), and 文杜陵 Wenduling (present-day Mindanao, Bintulu or Mindoro). By the 1300s, records from the Yuan Dynasty then indicate that Oton was already an independent city-state from Pon-i at this point. Oton having presumably joined into the Kedatuan of Madja-as formed in rebellion against the Borneo-centered empire of Rajah or Sultan Makatunao which was punished by having the Datus of Madja-as sack and destroy his empire.

As Oton was already a highly civilized city-state, contact-era chronicles by the Spanish had recorded that Oton had very well developed Carpentry and Ship Building industries. The arrival of the Spanish in 1566 marked a significant turning point in Oton's history. In 1572, the Spanish formally established and designated Oton as the capital of Alcaldia de Panay, later renamed Provincia de Oton, which covered the islands of Panay, Guimaras, Negros, Tablas, Sibuyan, and Romblon. Spanish missionaries used Oton as a base to spread Catholicism to neighboring settlements, including Jaro, Iloilo, Tigbauan, Cordova, Alimodian, Igbaras, Tubungan, Camando, Damilisan, and Tiolas.

Oton played a vital role in the Manila galleon trade, as new agricultural products from the trade route arrived in the town. Many ships traveling from Cebu would dock in Oton before continuing on to Manila. However, Oton's location made it vulnerable to pirate attacks, prompting the Spanish colonial authorities to relocate the capital a few kilometers away to La Punta, which is now known as Iloilo City Proper, in the 1600s. This move was intended to enhance the town's defense against pirate raids.

The town used to be the base of the Old Oton Church, the largest religious site in Western Visayas and one of the largest in the entire country. The mother church and convent were damaged by an earthquake in 1948. Instead of being restored, the ruins were demolished and a far smaller and less aesthetic structure was built. Since then, the number of visitors and church goers have dwindled through the decades. Generations of Oton residents, and Iloilo residents in general, have called for the authentic restoration of Oton church.

== Geography ==
Oton is 11 kilometres (6.8 mi) west from Iloilo City. Oton is bordered by the municipality of Tigbauan to the west, San Miguel to the north, Pavia to the northeast, Panay Gulf to the south, and is bordered by Iloilo City districts of Arevalo and Mandurriao to the southeast and east. The town is a part of Metro Iloilo-Guimaras which encompasses the whole island province of Guimaras with its municipalities, the Iloilo City, and the Iloilo provincial towns of Pavia, Leganes, San Miguel, Santa Barbara, and Cabatuan.

=== Barangays ===
Oton is politically subdivided into 37 barangays. Each barangay consists of puroks and some have sitios.

The Municipality of Oton belongs to the 1st District of Iloilo.

Listed below are the respective population of each barangay as of 2020 census.

- Abilay Norte - 8,963
- Abilay Sur - 1290
- Alegre - 2323
- Batuan Ilaud - 938
- Batuan Ilaya - 1229
- Bita Norte - 767
- Bita Sur - 550
- Botong - 5,242
- Buray - 6,727
- Cabanbanan - 2,833
- Cabolo-an Norte - 3,686
- Cabolo-an Sur - 834
- Cadinglian - 1,713
- Cagbang - 5,854
- Calam-isan - 1,318
- Galang - 1,129
- Lambuyao - 3,236
- Mambog - 924
- Pakiad - 3,728
- Poblacion East - 4,239
- Poblacion North - 1,322
- Poblacion South - 5,481
- Poblacion West - 3,122
- Pulo Maestra Vita - 3,783
- Rizal - 2,274
- Salngan - 701
- Sambaludan - 1,097
- San Antonio - 2,435
- San Nicolas - 3,191
- Santa Clara - 1,558
- Santa Monica - 2,969
- Santa Rita - 2,099
- Tagbac Norte - 1,284
- Tagbac Sur - 1,797
- Trapiche - 6,490
- Tuburan - 672
- Turog-Turog - 711

=== Climate ===
Climate data for Oton, Iloilo
Month	Jan	Feb	Mar	Apr	May	Jun	Jul	Aug	Sep	Oct	Nov	Dec	Year
Mean daily maximum °C (°F)	30 (86)	31 (88)	32 (90)	34 (93)	32 (90)	30 (86)	29 (84)	29 (84)	29 (84)	29 (84)	30 (86)	30 (86)	30 (87)
Mean daily minimum °C (°F)	21 (70)	21 (70)	22 (72)	23 (73)	25 (77)	25 (77)	25 (77)	24 (75)	24 (75)	24 (75)	23 (73)	22 (72)	23 (74)
Average precipitation mm (inches)	19 (0.7)	17 (0.7)	26 (1.0)	37 (1.5)	119 (4.7)	191 (7.5)	258 (10.2)	260 (10.2)	248 (9.8)	196 (7.7)	97 (3.8)	39 (1.5)	1,507 (59.3)
Average rainy days	7.2	5.2	8.3	11.9	22.3	26.5	28.3	28.2	27.3	26.4	18.7	11.8	222.1
Source: Meteoblue

== Demographics ==
Population census of Oton
Year	Pop.	±% p.a.
1903	14,464	—
1918	15,396	+0.42%
1939	20,577	+1.39%
1948	21,306	+0.39%
1960	27,246	+2.07%
1970	32,862	+1.89%
1975	36,566	+2.17%
1980	41,044	+2.34%
1990	52,125	+2.42%
1995	56,821	+1.63%
2000	65,374	+3.05%
2007	77,621	+2.40%
2010	82,572	+2.28%
2015	89,115	+1.46%
2020	98,509	+2.13%
2024	99,920	+0.34%
Source: Philippine Statistics Authority

In the 2024 census, the population of Oton was 99,920 people, with a density of 1,200 inhabitants per square kilometre or 3,100 inhabitants per square mile.

=== Religion ===
As a Catholic Dominant Municipality, Oton has two parishes.

Parishes:

- Immaculate Concepcion Parish (Town Parish)
- Sta. Monica Parish (Sta. Monica, Oton)

=== Language ===
Kinaray-a is the main language of the people in Oton. Hiligaynon is spoken as a secondary language. There is a fairly unnoticed linguistic division of the town between the two aforementioned languages; the eastern part, or the urban part bordering Iloilo City, primarily speaks Hiligaynon, while the western part bordering the other 1st district municipalities generally speaks both Kinaray-a and Hiligaynon.

== Economy ==
Poverty incidence of Oton

Source: Philippine Statistics Authority

Oton's economy is supported by its geographic proximity to Iloilo City. This has led to increased real estate developments, with more residential and commercial properties being established. Retail establishments in Oton include Gaisano Oton, Puregold Oton, and Vista Mall Iloilo. Oton also hosts a number of banking institutions.

Agriculture, particularly rice production and fruit farming, plays a significant role in the economy, supporting local food supply and the livelihoods of many residents. The town also has hotels, resorts, and restaurants.

In 2023, the Municipality of Oton began construction of a ₱52-million “AA” abattoir in Barangay Lambuyao funded by the World Bank-assisted Philippine Rural Development Project.

A major development in Oton owned by Vista Land is covering 500 hectares (1,200 acres) and stretching from Barangay Polo Maestra Bita to Barangay Abilay Norte. The development also includes a 100-hectare (250-acre) central business district.

Province established	Capital of Iloilo; 1572–1581	Succeeded by Arevalo
