= 1948 Lady Caycay earthquake =

Earthquake in the Philippines

- UTC time: 1948-01-24 17:46:44
- ISC event: 897163
- USGS-ANSS: ComCat
- Local date: 25 January 1948
- Local time: 01:46
- Duration: 3 minutes
- Magnitude: 7.8 M_{w} 8.2 M_{s}
- Depth: 15 km (9 mi)
- Epicenter: 10°48′00″N 122°17′42″E
- Areas affected: Philippines
- Total damage: ₱7,000,000
- Max. intensity: PEIS IX (MMI X)
- Tsunami: Yes
- Landslides: Yes
- Casualties: ~ 74 (est)

The 1948 Lady Caycay earthquake occurred at 01:46 PHT (UTC+08:00) on 25 January 1948 with an estimated moment magnitude of 7.8 and a maximum Mercalli intensity of X (Extreme). The epicenter was between the municipalities of Anini-y, Antique, and Dao (present-day Tobias Fornier in Antique) on Panay Island, Philippines.

The earthquake was the second biggest on record in the country and caused widespread damage in Panay and nearby islands. However, accounts of its intensity and the tsunamis it generated are sparse, possibly because the earthquake struck as the Philippines was recovering from the effects of the Second World War.

== Etymology ==
Caycay is a Kinaray-a and Hiligaynon term describing the scratches on the ground similar to those made by chickens. The effects of the earthquake, which chiefly manifested as fissures on the ground, were said to be similar to chicken scratches. Much of Iloilo province lies on soft ground, which is one of the possible reasons for the numerous fissures that appeared, especially in low-lying parts of the province.

== Effects ==
Along with the 1948 Lady CayCay earthquake (7.8 M_{w}), other relatively strong events near the area were in 1950 (6.7 M_{w}) and 1951 (6.5 M_{w}). See also the Negros Trench in the map below.

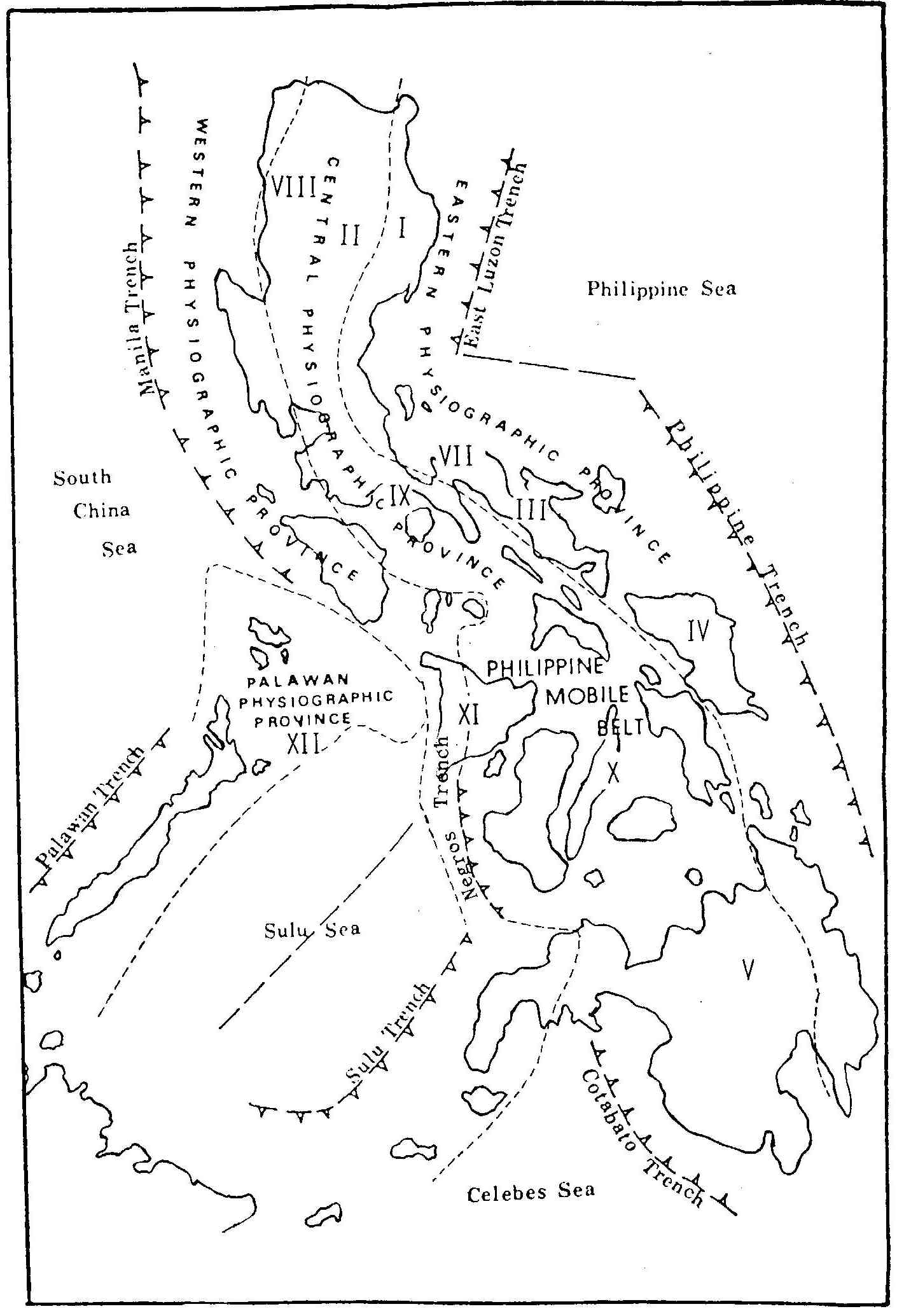
The Negros Trench in the western Visayas and the Philippine Mobile Belt

José María Cuenco, the Bishop of Jaro, estimated that the damage to 15 churches destroyed on Panay alone amounted to ₱7,000,000.

=== Antique province ===
In the town of Anini-y (the earthquake's epicentre), no distinct damage was seen in the century-old church—the only confirmed masonry structure existing at the time. The church, which was originally built in 1830 had been damaged during the Second World War. In Pandan and Culasi towns, it was reported that 50% of the houses were destroyed. Massive landslides also occurred in the mountain area.

=== Aklan province ===
Ibajay Bridge and Kalibo Bridge, which were two of the biggest bridges in Panay, sustained damage.

=== Capiz province ===
The Immaculate Conception Metropolitan Cathedral in Capiz (now Roxas City) was reported to have been damaged by the earthquake.

=== Iloilo province ===
Most of the significant damage was found in the Iloilo province, specifically to the extant Spanish-era churches. Bridges, communication lines, as well as public and private buildings all sustained heavy damage.

The churches in Igbaras, San Miguel, Oton, and Maasin were severely damaged and were demolished. The belfries of churches in Alimodian, Duenas, Dumangas, Guimbal, Lambunao, Passi, San Joaquin, and Arevalo districts in Iloilo City collapsed, while Jaro Cathedral (the city's episcopal see) was also severely damaged. Twenty-one people were reportedly killed in the city, and another forty-three were injured. Damage to churches was estimated at ₱200,000, with the total damage to the city reaching ₱1,000,000. The Coronet Tower in Arevalo District also collapsed, as did the old Central School and back portion of the church in León. The churches of Pavia, Tubungan, Miag-ao, and Tigbauan also sustained damage.

==== Fissures ====
Fissures erupted in the streets, causing traffic disruptions. Fissures were also observed along the roads between Pototan and Dingle and along the Santa Barbara railway. Fissures were also noted in the streets of Oton(Bautista, M.L.P, et al., 2011).

Ground disruptions described as "little canyons", possibly the sand blows, were observed in Pototan, Cabatuan, Dingle, Passi, and Calinog. A new, small brook appeared after huge cracks appeared at Tiring Landing Field (now the site of the Iloilo International Airport) in Cabatuan. In the city's Fort San Pedro, large fissures 4 metres wide by 10 metres long opened such that seawater was already visible.

== Tsunami ==
Local accounts have pointed to a 2-metre high wave that was seen after the earthquake. Fish corals from the Iloilo shore towns of Oton to San Joaquin were destroyed by the tsunami. Damage was estimated to be at ₱250,000. The fish corals were detached from the log moorings. The waves did not move inward, sparing more damage to life and property further inland.

== See also ==
- List of earthquakes in 1948
- List of earthquakes in the Philippines
