= Old Oton Church =

Roman Catholic church in Iloilo, Philippines

Oton Church
- Iglesia Parroquial Inmaculada Concepción
- Immaculate Conception Parish Church
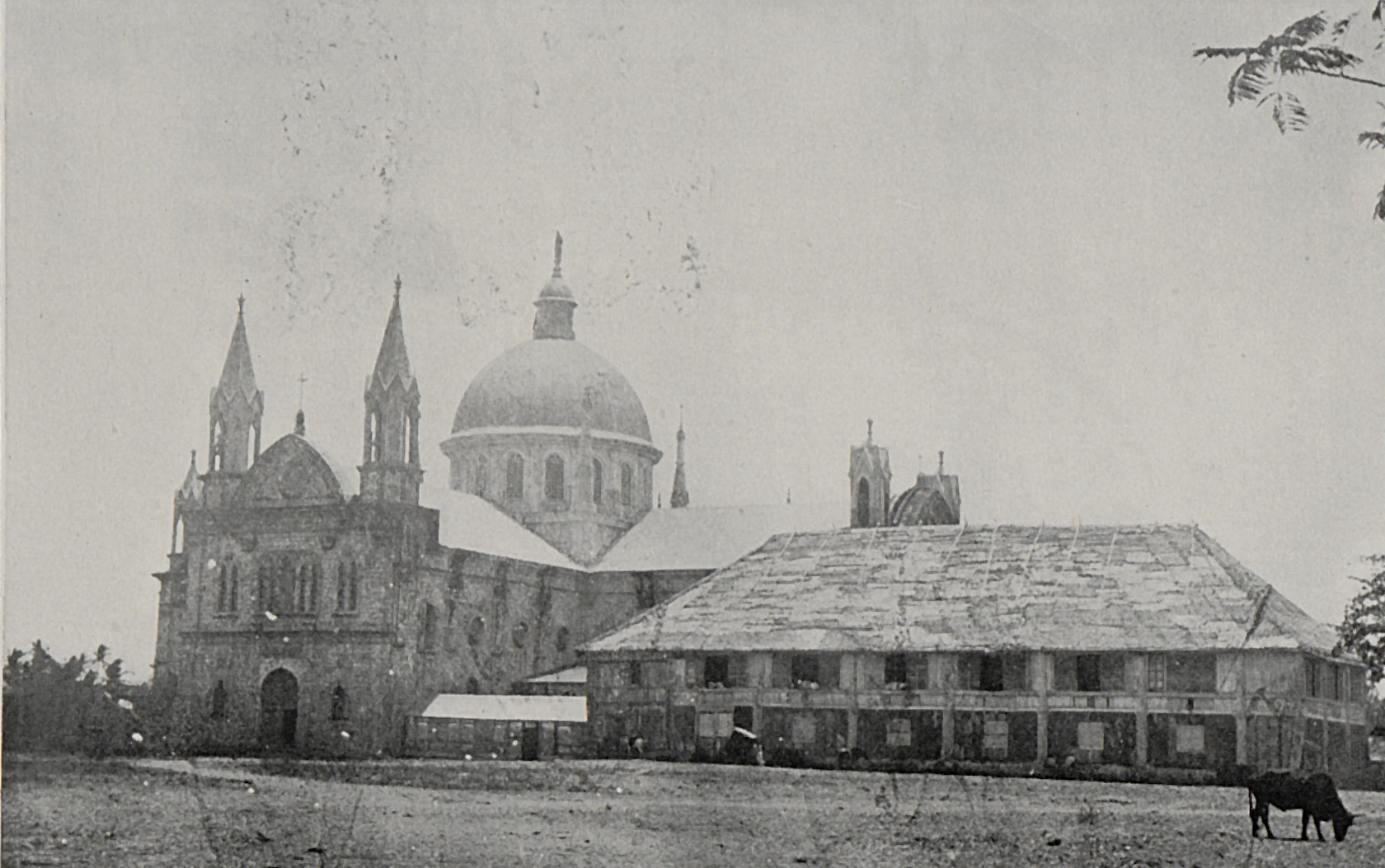
- The church in 1901

- Location in the Visayas Location in the Philippines
- 10°41′33.4″N 122°28′45.3″E
- Location: Oton, Iloilo
- Country: Philippines
- Denomination: Roman Catholic

History
- Status: Parish Church
- Founded: 1572; 454 years ago
- Dedication: Immaculate Conception
- Consecrated: 1891; 135 years ago

Architecture
- Functional status: Inactive (Demolished)
- Architectural type: Church building
- Style: Gothic-Neoclassical
- Groundbreaking: 1845; 181 years ago
- Completed: 1882; 144 years ago
- Demolished: 1948; 78 years ago

Specifications
- Height: 68.28 m (224.0 ft)
- Materials: Coral and Limestone

Administration
- Archdiocese: Jaro

The old Oton Church, also known as the Immaculate Conception Parish Church, was a gothic-neoclassical Roman Catholic church located in Oton, Iloilo, Philippines. Once one of the largest churches in the country, it was destroyed in an earthquake in 1948. The largest and grandest in the Visayas, it's referred by many as their mother church in Western Visayas. Since the replacement of the church complex (including the convent) with an inferior structure after it was damaged and demolished, generations have called for its full authentic restoration.

== History ==
The town of Ogtong (now known as Oton) was founded in 1566 by the Spaniards, becoming the second Spanish settlement in the Philippines, after Cebu. The first chapel was built in the same year following the Spanish establishment of Oton.

In 1572, the Augustinian friars, led by Friar Martin de Rada, arrived in Oton from Dumangas, where they had successfully evangelized the local population. They founded their chapter house in Oton on May 3, 1572, making it the third such establishment after Cebu and Manila. That same year, the church dedicated to Our Lady of the Immaculate Conception was declared a parish. The initial church in Oton was destroyed on September 29, 1614, during an attack by Dutch privateers led by Georges Spillberg. The town faced additional attacks from British forces in 1593, the Dutch in 1630, and Moro raiders in 1662. Despite these challenges, the Augustinians maintained their mission in Oton.

The Spanish-era colonial church was constructed under Friar Demetrio Cobos between 1845 and 1853. Construction continued and was completed by Friar Joaquin Fernandez in 1882, with interior decorations credited to Friar Nicolas Gallo between 1889 and 1890. The church was officially consecrated in 1891.

On January 24, 1948, the Lady Caycay Earthquake, with an estimated magnitude of 7.8, struck the Philippines, causing extensive damage. The church was severely damaged and reduced to rubble. In the aftermath, the church was demolished to make way for the present-day Immaculate Conception Church. The construction of the new church, initiated by Fr. Ernesto L. Calvo, the first Filipino parish priest in Oton, took two decades to complete. The new church was blessed on Christmas Day, December 25, 1972, and a marker commemorating its consecration was installed by the main entrance by Fr. Renato Elmido in 1988. Only two bells and some stone remnants of the old church survived the disaster.

=== Calls for Restoration ===
Since the demolition of the megalithic church of Oton, there have been public calls for its full authentic restoration. However, a new far smaller and less aesthetic church was built instead. Since the replacement of the old church with the more modern structure, the number of visitors have dwindled through the decades. Generations of residents and their descendants have continued to call for the authentic restoration of Oton church, and restore Oton's place as home to the largest religious site in Western Visayas.

== Architecture ==
The church was once among the largest churches in the Philippines. It was notable for its combination of Greek, Byzantine, and Gothic-Classical architectural elements. The church was designed in the shape of a Greek cross, with all four arms of equal length. Each side of the cross featured two towers, totaling six towers for the entire church. At the center of the church is a large altar or retablo mayor, a distinctive feature not commonly found in Philippine churches. The church's dome rises to a height of 68.28 metres (224.0 ft).

== Gallery ==
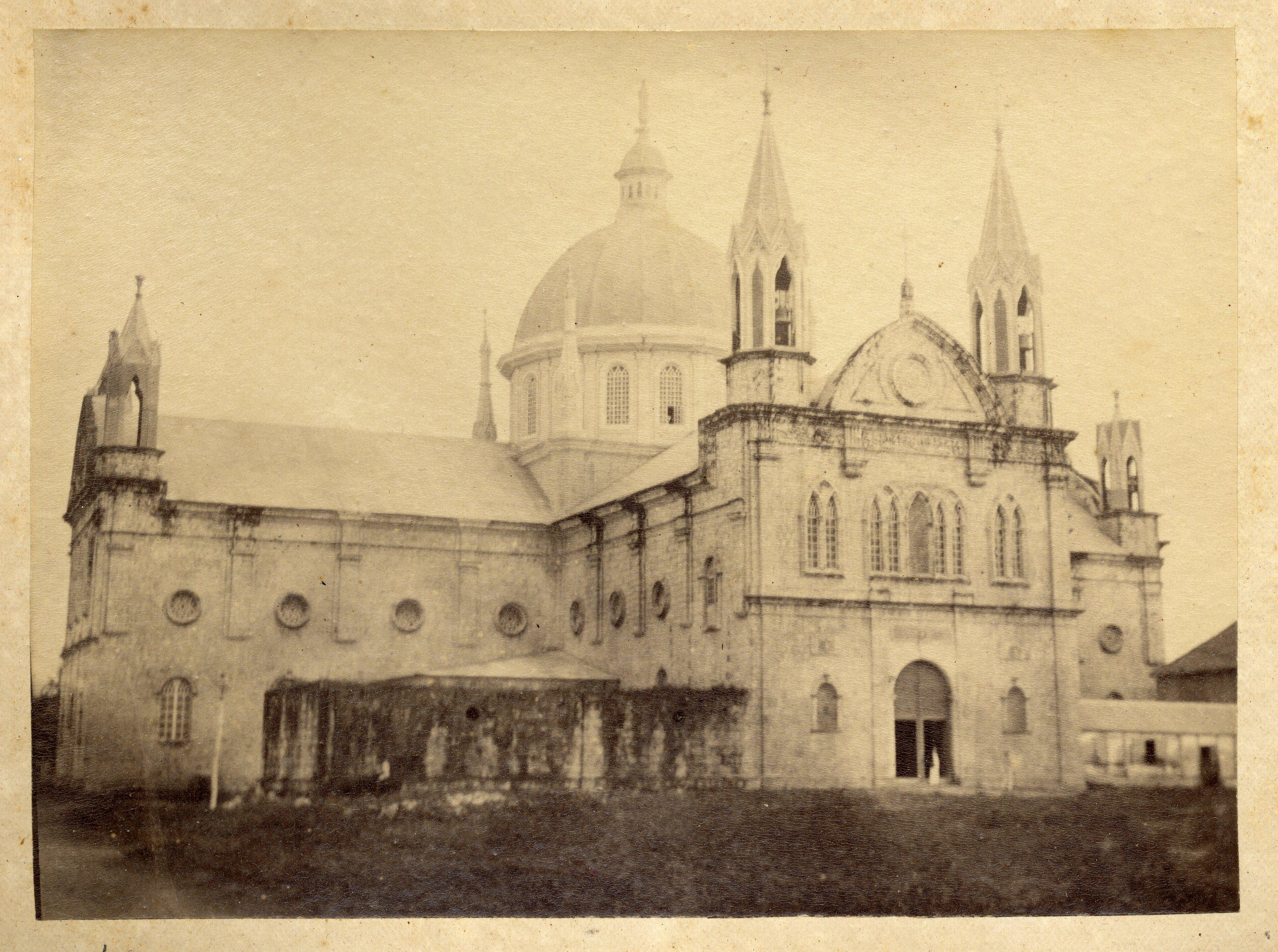
The church in 1890s.

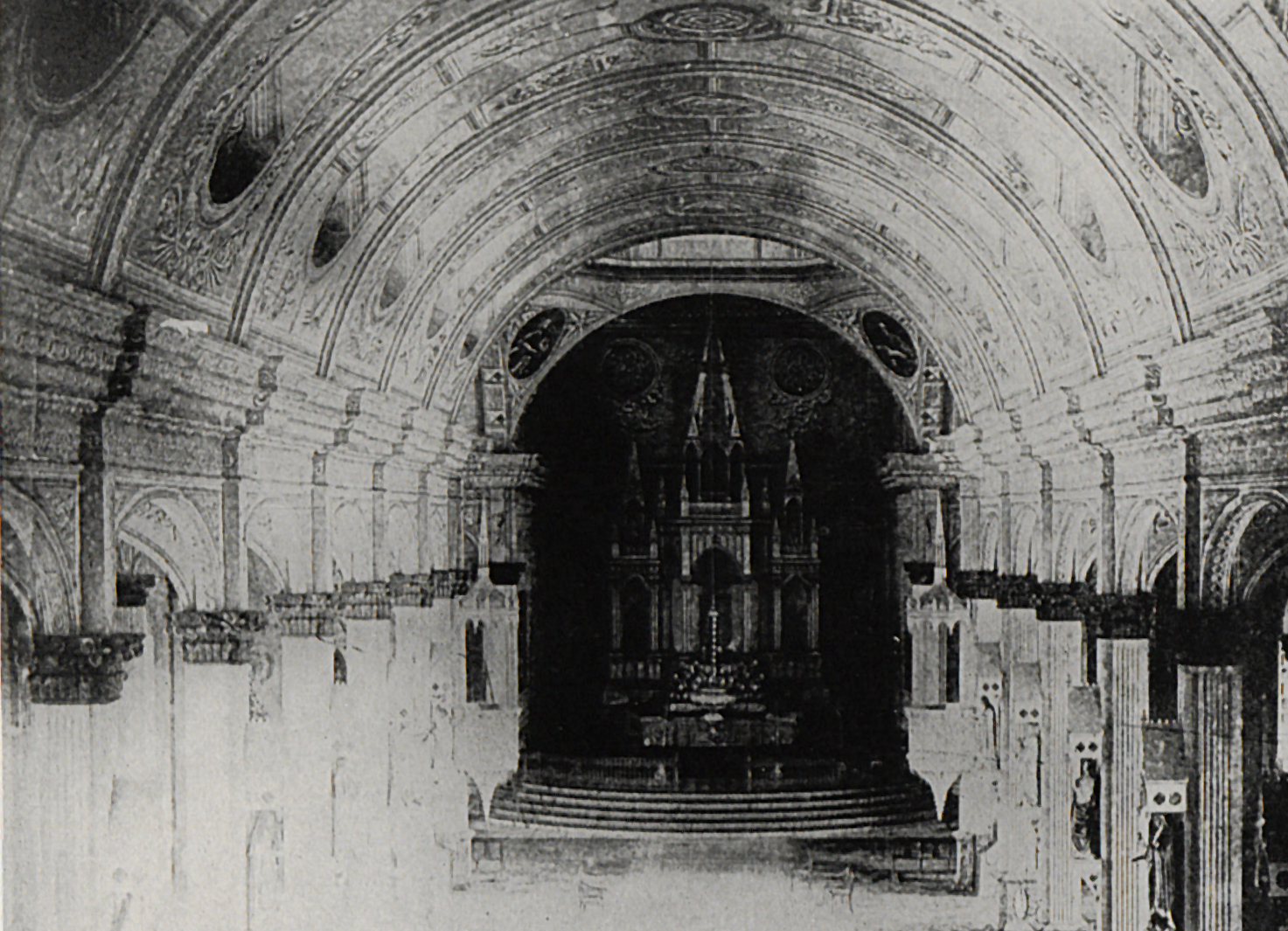
One of the naves of the church.

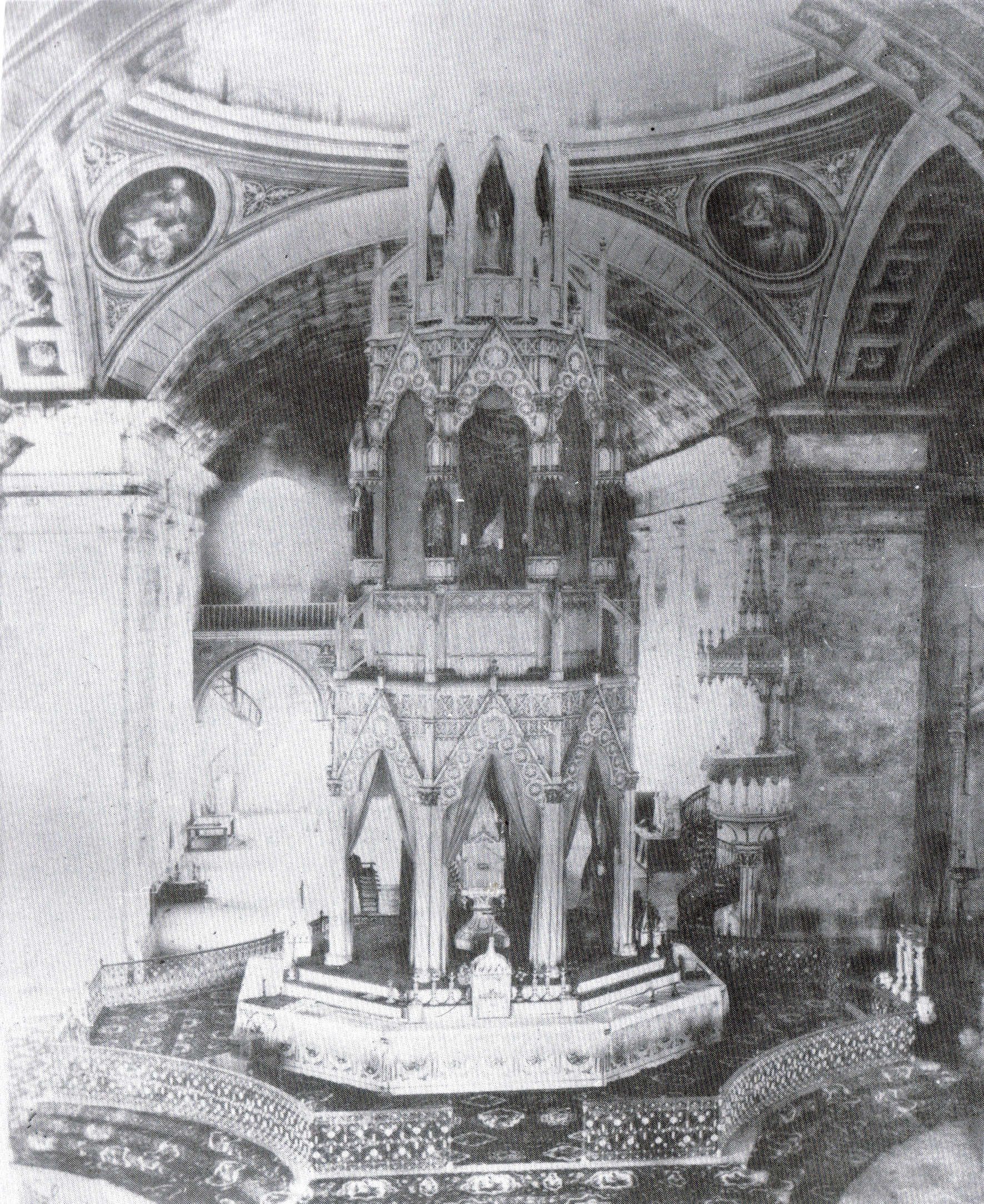
The central altar of the church.

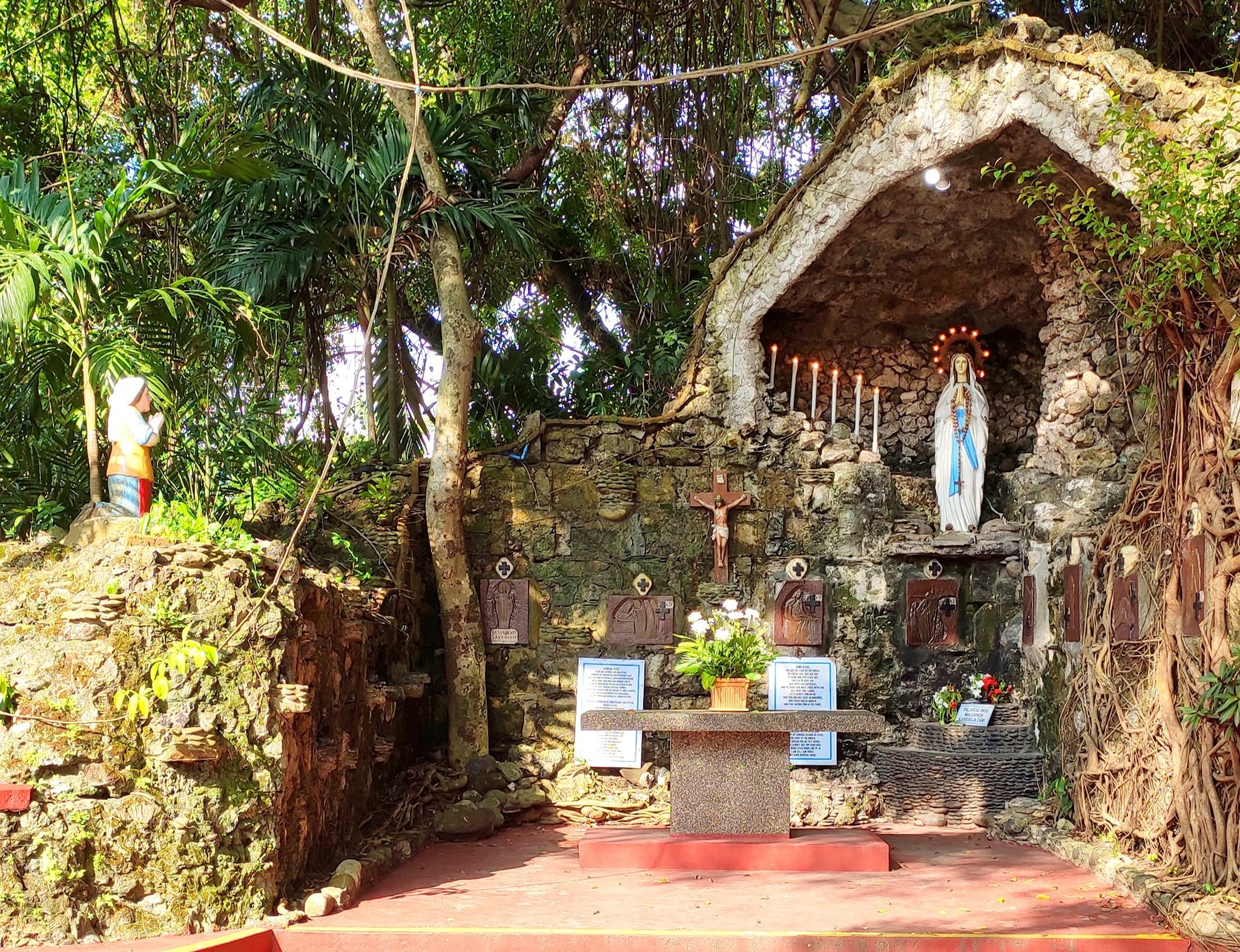
The small part of the ruin walls of the Old Oton Church what’s left today which was made into a charming and seemingly enchanting grotto located beside the new church.
