= El Toro =

El Toro, Spanish for "the bull", may refer to:

== Geography ==
- El Toro (Mallorca), a neighbourhood in the municipality of Calvià on the island of Mallorca
- El Toro, Castellón, a town in Castellón, Spain
- El Toro (Jujuy), a rural municipality and village in Jujuy Province in Argentina
- El Toro, Herrera, a corregimiento in Panama
- El Toro, California, the name of a former town now part of the city of Lake Forest, California
- Marine Corps Air Station El Toro, a decommissioned U.S. military base in Orange County, California
- El Toro Y, a freeway interchange in Irvine, California
- El Toro, a small town on Toas island, capital of Almirante Padilla Municipality in Zulia state, Venezuela
- Rancho El Toro, a Mexican land grant in present-day Monterey County, California
- El Toro Wilderness on the island of Puerto Rico

=== Mountains and hills ===
- El Toro (Menorca), the highest hill in Menorca, Spain
- El Toro (Santa Clara County, California), a in the eastern foothills of the Santa Cruz Mountains, California
- El Toro (Sierra de Luquillo), a peak in the El Yunque National Forest in Puerto Rico
- Cerro El Toro, a mountain in the Andes on the border between Argentina and Chile
- Cerro El Toro (Upata), a mountain on the northwest side of Upata, Venezuela
- Pico El Toro, a mountain in the Andes of Venezuela
- El Toro, a peak in Nuevo León, Mexico noted for the rock climb El Sendero Luminoso

== People and characters ==
- El Toro (nickname), a list of people
- El Toro Fuerte, a Jackie Chan Adventures character

== Roller coasters ==
- El Toro (Six Flags Great Adventure), a wooden roller coaster at Six Flags Great Adventure in New Jersey, USA
- El Toro (Freizeitpark Plohn), a wooden roller coaster at Freizeitpark Plohn in Germany

== Other uses ==
- El Toro (dinghy), a class of sailing dinghy
- El Toro, a custom car, winner of the 1976 Ridler Award
- El Toro High School, a high school in Lake Forest, California
- El Toro Hydroelectric Plant in Bío-Bío Region, Chile
- El Toro Road, also called County Route S18 (CR S18)
- Battle of El Toro, during the Chilean War of Independence

== See also ==
- Toro (disambiguation)
- El Torito (disambiguation)
