= El Torito (disambiguation) =

El Torito is a Mexican chain restaurant.

El Torito may also refer to:

- Espectrito (1966–2016), ring name of professional wrestler
- Mascarita Dorada (born 1982), former WWE wrestler who performed under the ring name El Torito
- El Torito (CD-ROM standard), CD-ROM specification used to allow a computer to boot from a CD-ROM
- The nickname of the singer Héctor Acosta
- A character in Ustedes los ricos

== See also ==
- Torito, a Mexican cocktail
- El Toro (disambiguation)
