= Bull (nickname) =

Bull, The Bull, and Da Bull are used as nicknames and ring names.

Those so named include:

- Bill Adams (1900–1973), Australian rules footballer
- Donnis Churchwell (1936–2010), American former National Football League player
- Bull Buchanan, ring name of Barry Buchanan (born 1968), American wrestler
- Bull Connor (1897–1973), American politician infamous for opposing desegregation in Birmingham, Alabama, in the 1960s
- Bull Curry, ring name of Fred Thomas Koury Sr. (1913–1985), American professional wrestler
- Johnny Davis (born 1956), American former National Football League player
- Ed Durham (1907–1976), American baseball pitcher
- Leon Durham (born 1957), American baseball first baseman
- Luis Ángel Firpo (1894–1960), Argentine boxer nicknamed "The Wild Bull of The Pampas"
- Sammy Gravano (born 1945), former underboss of the Gambino crime family
- David Gurfein, United States Marine Corps lieutenant colonel, and CEO of nonprofit organization United American Patriots
- William Halsey Jr. (1882–1959), United States Navy fleet admiral
- Johnny Hoogerland (born 1983), Dutch cyclist nicknamed the "Bull of Beveland"
- Terry Jenkins (born 1963), English darts player
- Brooks Lawrence (1925–2000), American Negro National League and Major League Baseball pitcher
- Greg Luzinski (born 1950), American Major League Baseball outfielder and designated hitter
- Frank McCaffrey (1888–1952), American college football player and 1917 head football coach of Fordham University
- Harshad Mehta (1954–2001), Indian stockbroker and fraudster, nicknamed "The Big Bull" and "Raging Bull"
- Bull Montana (1887–1950), American professional wrestler and actor
- Bull Nakano (born 1968), ring name of Japanese women's professional wrestler Keiko Nakano
- William "Bull" Nelson (1824–1862), United States Army major-general during the American Civil War, and United States Navy officer prior to the war
- Greg Noll (1937–2021), American surfing pioneer
- Bull Pain, American professional wrestler
- Bull Polisky (1901–1978), American football player
- Alan Richardson (1940–2015), Australian footballer
- Franz Roth (born 1946), German former footballer
- Hakan Şükür (born 1971), Turkish retired footballer nicknamed the "Bull of the Bosphorus"
- Edwin Vose Sumner (1797–1863), American Civil War Union Army general
- Tsang Kin-shing (born 1957), Hong Kong politician

== See also ==
- El Toro (nickname), Spanish for "the Bull"
- Raging Bull (disambiguation), includes a list of people with the nickname
- The Big Bull, 2021 Indian film about Harshad Mehta by Kookie Gulati
- The Bull Of Dalal Street, 2020 Indian webseries about Harshad Mehta on Ullu
- David Jones (rugby, born 1881) (1881–1933), Welsh rugby union and rugby league footballer nicknamed "Tarw" (Welsh for "Bull")
- Scam 1992: The Harshad Mehta Story, 2020 Indian webseries on Sony Liv
