= Salvador Ferrando =

Mexican painter

Salvador Ferrando (1835–1908) was a Mexican painter from Tlacotalpan who specialized in portraits and landscapes, mostly of the Papaloapan and Tlacotalpan regions. A museum in his hometown is named after him and contains a number of his works. Many of Ferrando's works were rescued by an architect named Humberto Aguirre Tinoco, and a number of them can be seen at the Museo de Arte de Veracruz in the city of Orizaba.
