= Miagao =

Municipality in Iloilo, Philippines

- Municipality
- Municipality of Miagao
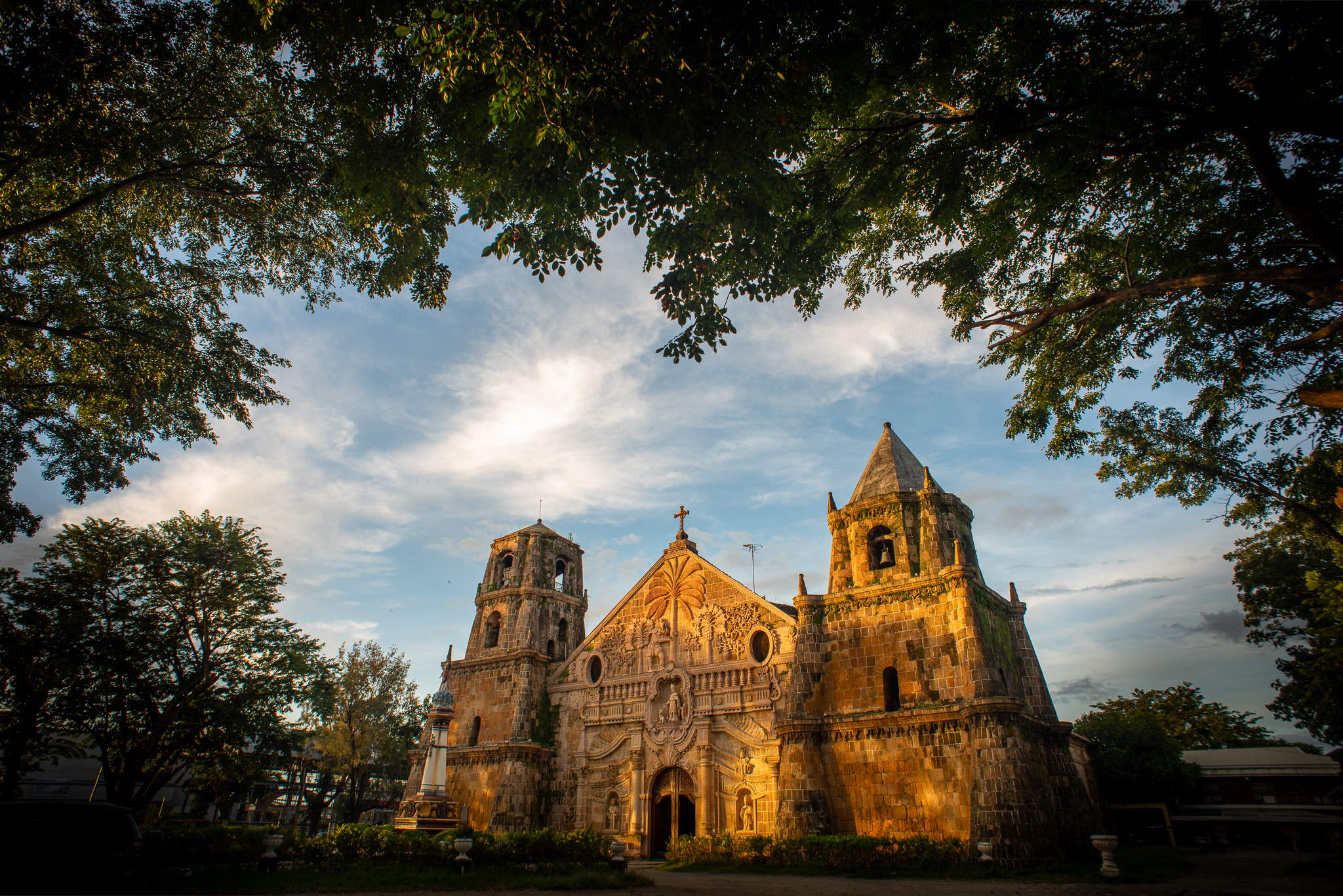
- Miagao Church

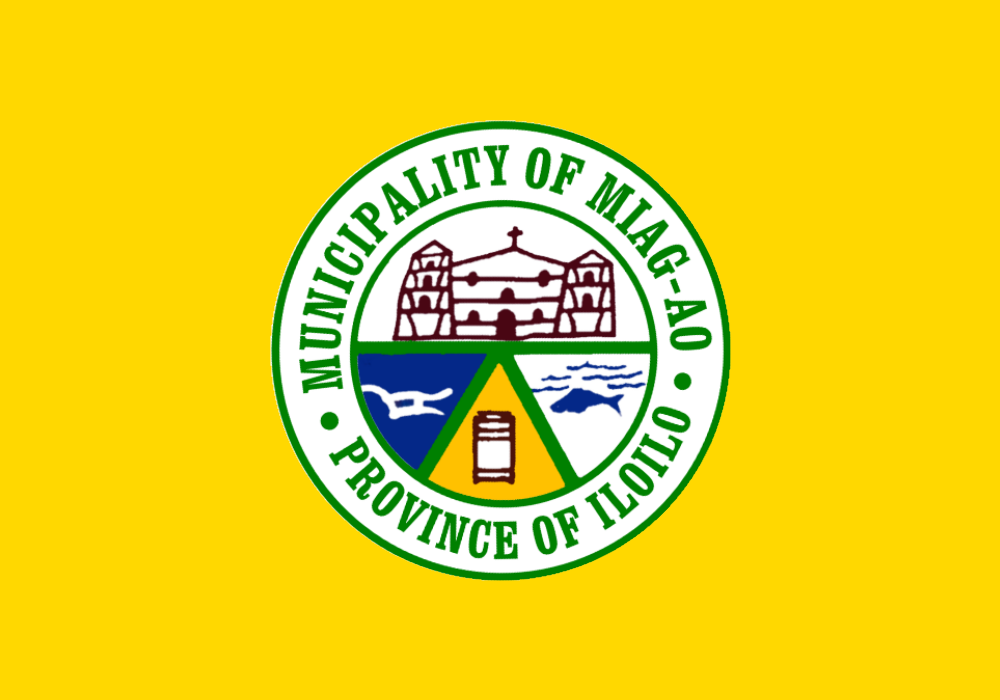
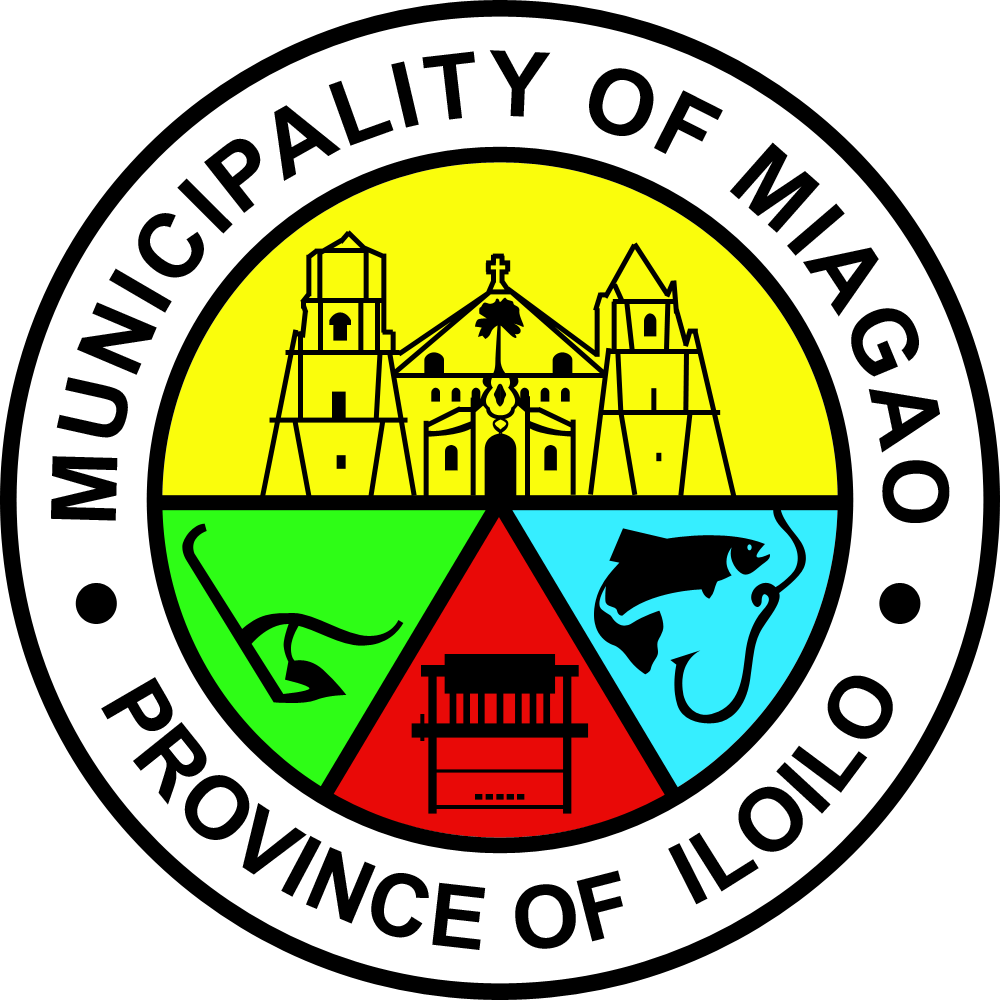
- Flag Seal
- Nickname: "Onion Capital of the Visayas"
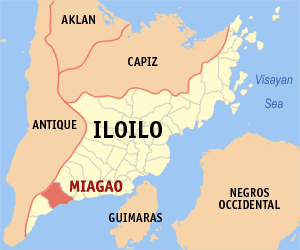
- Map of Iloilo with Miagao highlighted
- Interactive map of Miagao
- Location within the Philippines
- Coordinates: 10°38′39″N 122°14′07″E
- Country: Philippines
- Region: Western Visayas
- Province: Iloilo
- District: 1st district
- Barangays: 119 (see Barangays)

Government
  - Type: Sangguniang Bayan
  - Mayor: Oscar S. Garin, Jr. (Lakas)
  - Vice Mayor: Ma. Salve N. Pechayco (PFP)
  - Representative: Janette L. Garin (Lakas)
  - Municipal Council: Members: Japhet Grace G. Moleta (Lakas); Lea Marie D. Naldoza (Lakas); Richard T. Esposo (PFP); Gemma S. Nulada (Lakas); Gemma Rei S. Nismal (Lakas); Jun Carlu A. Napulan (PFP); Marlou R. Niones (Lakas); Jessica P. Torrecampo (Lakas); Jimmy F. Ferolino ^{‡}; Carlo Miguel N. Paguntulan ^{◌}; ‡ ex officio ABC president; ◌ ex officio SK chairman
  - Electorate: 42,582 voters (2025)

Area
  - Total: 156.80 km^{2} (60.54 sq mi)
- Elevation: 29 m (95 ft)
- Highest elevation: 1,100 m (3,600 ft)
- Lowest elevation: 0 m (0 ft)

Population (2024 census)
  - Total: 68,163
  - Density: 434.71/km^{2} (1,125.9/sq mi)
  - Households: 16,006

Economy
  - Income class: 1st municipal income class
  - Poverty incidence: 11.85% (2023)
  - Revenue: ₱ 286.8 million (2024)
  - Assets: ₱ 1,601 million (2024)
  - Expenditure: ₱ 82.42 million (2024)
  - Liabilities: ₱ 422.1 million (2024)

Service provider
  - Electricity: Iloilo 1 Electric Cooperative (ILECO 1)
- Time zone: UTC+8 (PST)
- ZIP code: 5023
- PSGC: 063030000
- IDD : area code: +63 (0)33
- Native languages: Karay-a; Hiligaynon; Tagalog
- Website: www.miagao.gov.ph

Miagao (also written Miag-ao), officially the Municipality of Miagao (Kinaray-a: Banwa kang Miagao; Hiligaynon: Banwa sang Miagao; Tagalog: Bayan ng Miagao), is a municipality in the province of Iloilo, Philippines. According to the 2024 census, it has a population of 68,163 people.

Miagao is considered as the "Onion Capital of the Visayas". The town center of the municipality lies on the western bank of the Tumagbok River, the largest river in the municipality. The poblacion is made up of eight barangays.

The town holds their patronal fiesta in honor of St. Thomas of Villanova (more commonly known as Santo Tomas de Villanueva) every September 22 that lasts several days. The town is also the location of one of the Baroque Churches of the Philippines, the Miagao Church, which was inscribed as a UNESCO World Heritage Site. The entire town of Miagao was later inscribed as a UNESCO World Heritage City and became a member of the Organization of World Heritage Cities (OWHC).

== Etymology ==
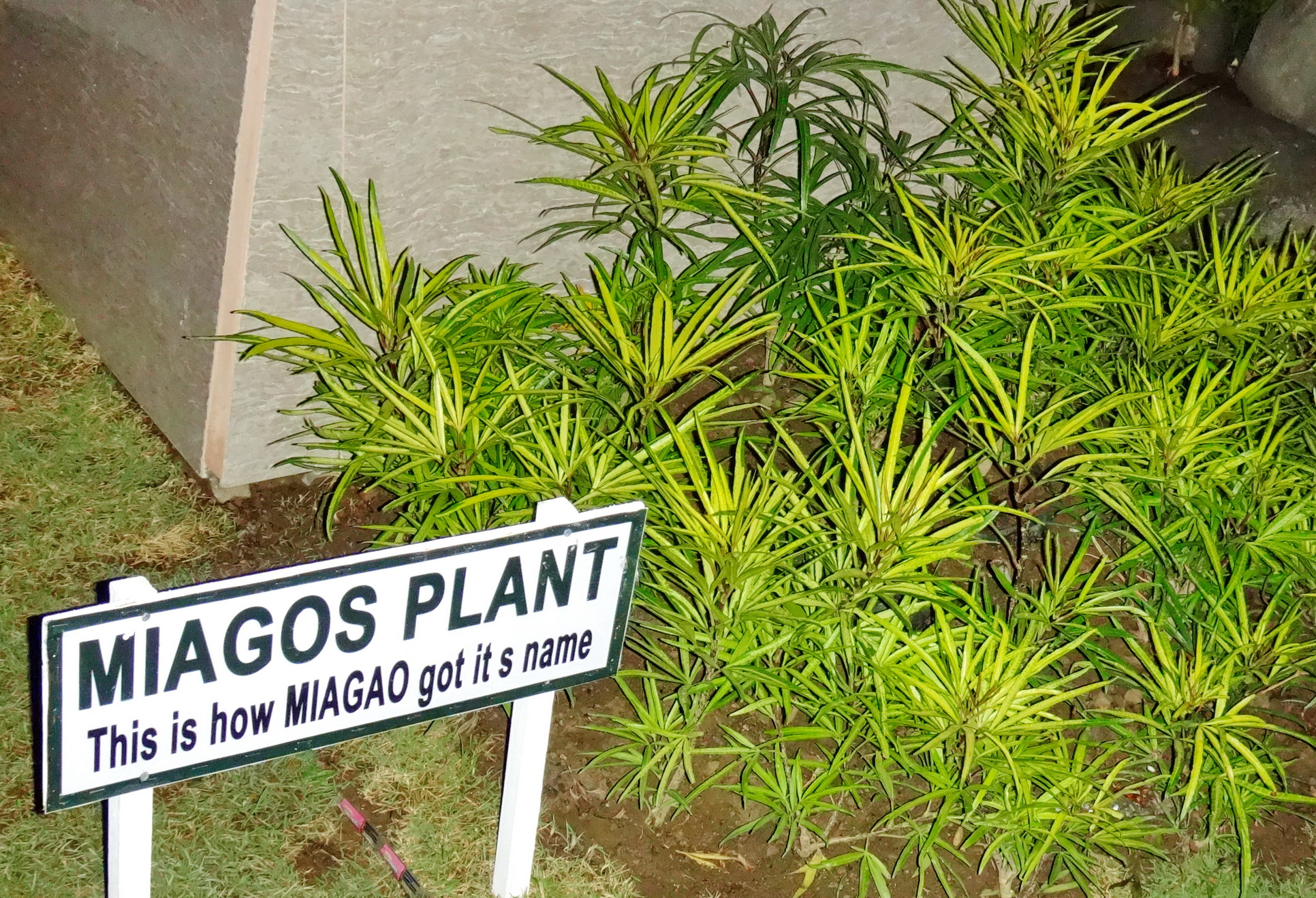
Miagos (Osmoxylon lineare) at the front of Miagao Municipal Hall. Miagao derived its name from this plant.

The name of Miagao has many disputed etymologies. One of the most popular, and probably the most widely accepted version is that the name of the town was derived from a plant named Miagos. Miagos or Osmoxylon lineare is a flowering plant from the family Araliaceae that used to grow abundantly in the area when the Spaniards came. Because of its abundance in the area, the Spaniards named the place Miagos which later became Miagao. Another version, according to Rev. Fr. Lorenzo Torres of Igbaras, is that a native named "Miyagaw" was asked by the Spaniards for the name of the place but gave his name instead.

== History ==
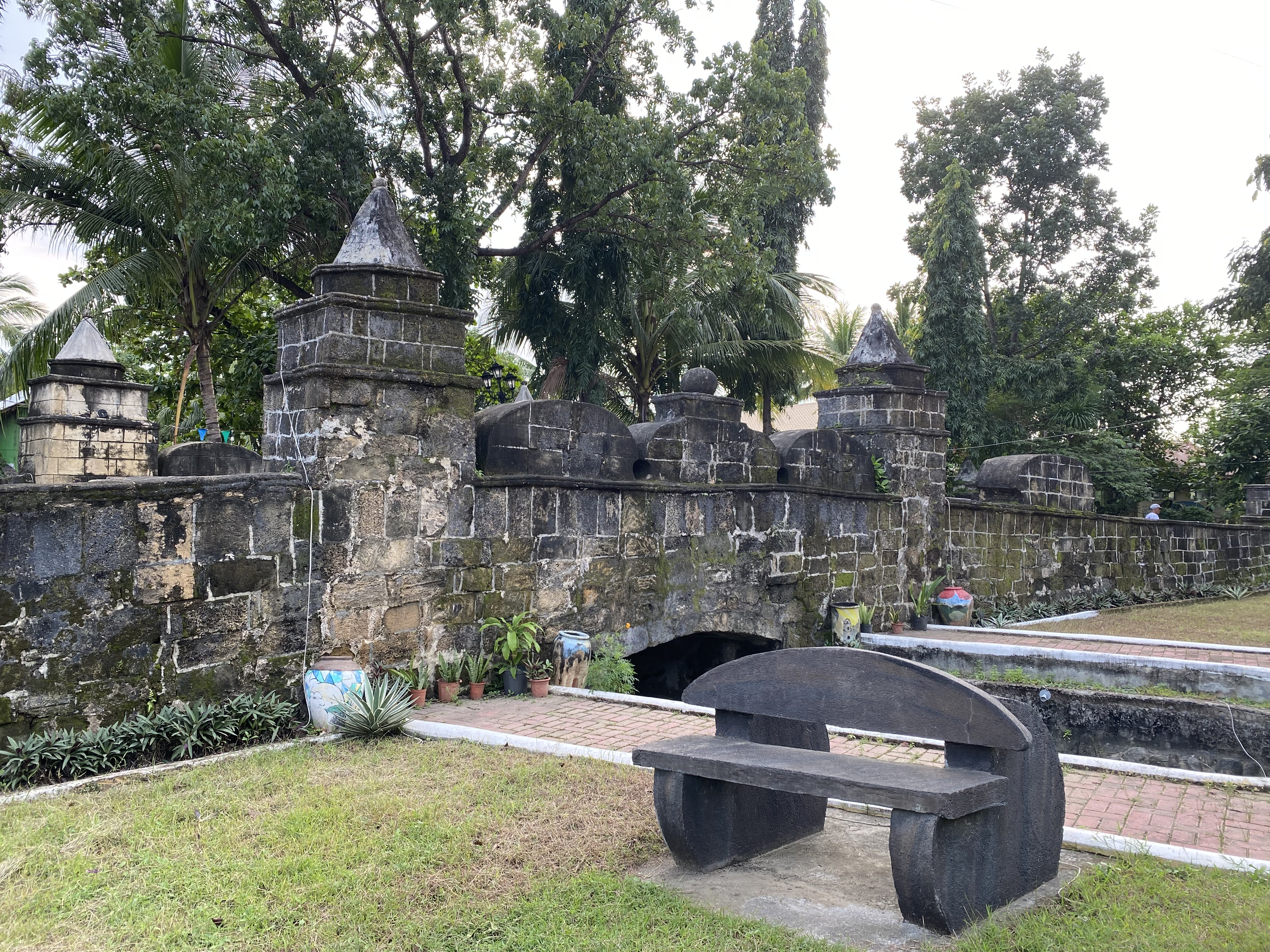
Taytay Boni, a Spanish colonial-era stone bridge, the oldest in Miag-ao and a National Cultural Treasure

A settlement in Damilisan were recorded by Spanish Map early in 1700 with 13,493 people and 2,974 houses. Miagao gained its independence as a municipality in 1716 . Prior to that, it used to be a part of an arrabal of four different towns in southern Iloilo. Until 1580, Miagao was an arrabal of Oton. From 1580 until 1652, it was an arrabal of Tigbauan. It was an arrabal of Suaraga (now San Joaquin) from 1652 to 1703 and before becoming independent, it became an arrabal of Guimbal from 1703 to 1716. In 1731, Miagao had its first capitan and teniente mayor (now equivalent to mayor and vice mayor) after an election was held in Guimbal under the supervision of Victorino C. Ma., an authorized representative of the governor.

== Geography ==
=== Topography ===
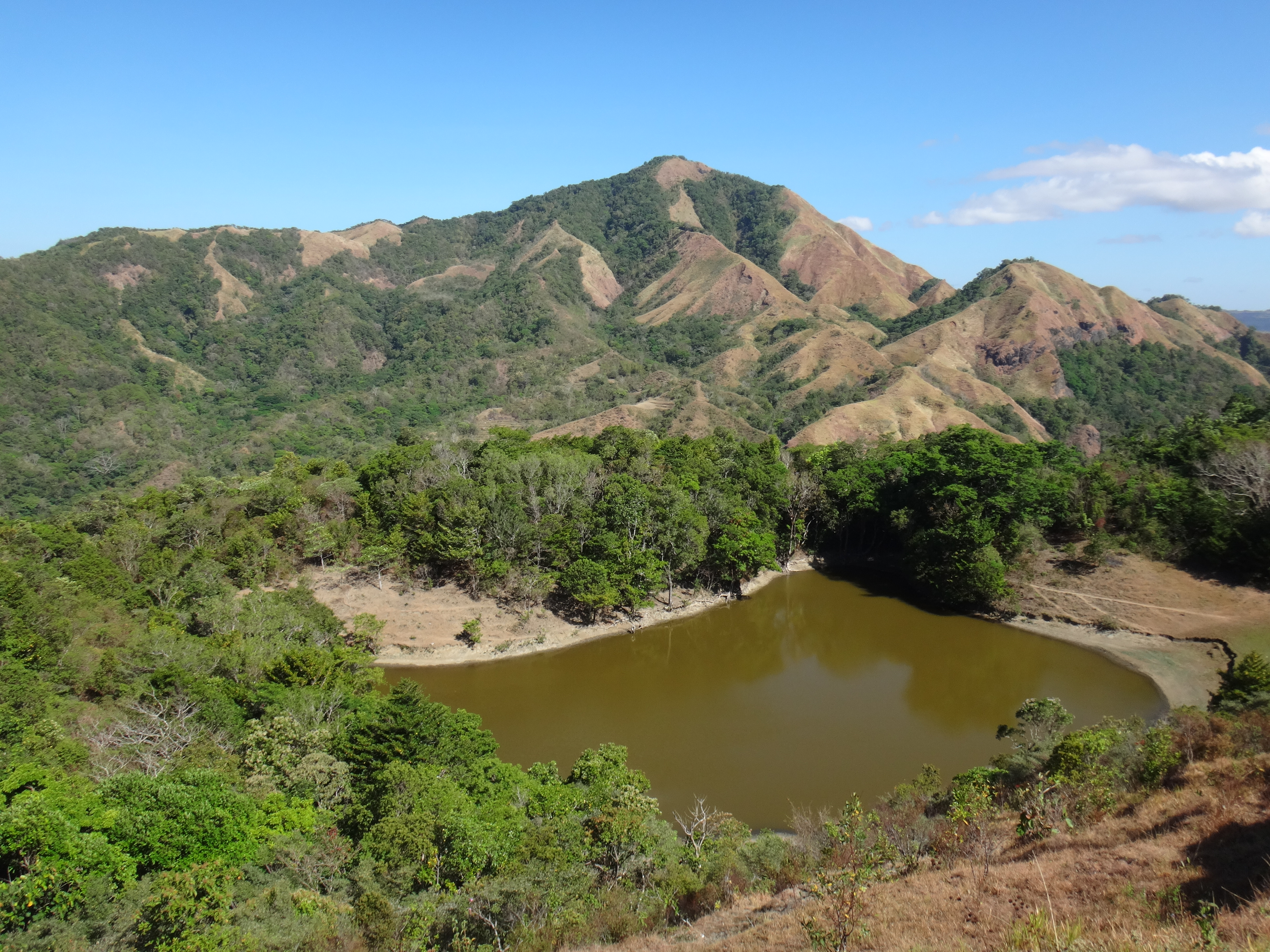
Tinagong Dagat or Danao is a small freshwater lake on top of a mountain in Barangay Ongyod, Miagao.

Miagao is a coastal town with a hilly to mountainous terrain. Most of the flat areas in the municipality are found either in coasts or along the town's major rivers which include the Naulid, Tumagbok, Oyaoy, Bacauan, Tabunacan, Oyungan, Lanutan, and San Rafael rivers. A mountain range forms a natural boundary between Miagao and the province of Antique to the north.

The highest point in the municipality is the summit of Mount Tulajon, locally spelled as Tulahong, at 1,100 meters asl located in Barangay Ongyod.

=== Climate ===
Climate data for Miagao, Iloilo, Philippines
Month	Jan	Feb	Mar	Apr	May	Jun	Jul	Aug	Sep	Oct	Nov	Dec	Year
Mean daily maximum °C (°F)	29 (84)	29 (84)	30 (86)	32 (90)	32 (90)	32 (90)	31 (88)	31 (88)	31 (88)	31 (88)	30 (86)	29 (84)	32.00 (89.60)
Daily mean °C (°F)	26.5 (79.7)	26.5 (79.7)	27.5 (81.5)	28.5 (83.3)	28.5 (83.3)	28.5 (83.3)	28.0 (82.4)	28.0 (82.4)	28.0 (82.4)	28.0 (82.4)	27.5 (81.5)	27.0 (80.6)	27.71 (81.88)
Mean daily minimum °C (°F)	24 (75)	24 (75)	25 (77)	25 (77)	25 (77)	25 (77)	25 (77)	25 (77)	25 (77)	25 (77)	25 (77)	25 (77)	24.00 (75.20)
Average rainfall mm (inches)	79.2 (3.12)	47.7 (1.88)	63.3 (2.49)	52.0 (2.05)	126.8 (4.99)	228.6 (9.00)	239.4 (9.43)	181.2 (7.13)	204.2 (8.04)	283.1 (11.15)	245.1 (9.65)	186.6 (7.35)	1,937.2 (76.27)

The municipality has a type I climate based on PAGASA's climate classification chart. The climate of Miagao is greatly affected by north-east and south-west monsoons. The town experiences a pronounced wet season from May to October and a dry season from November to April. The coolest months are the months of December to February while the hottest months are the months of April and May.

=== Barangays ===
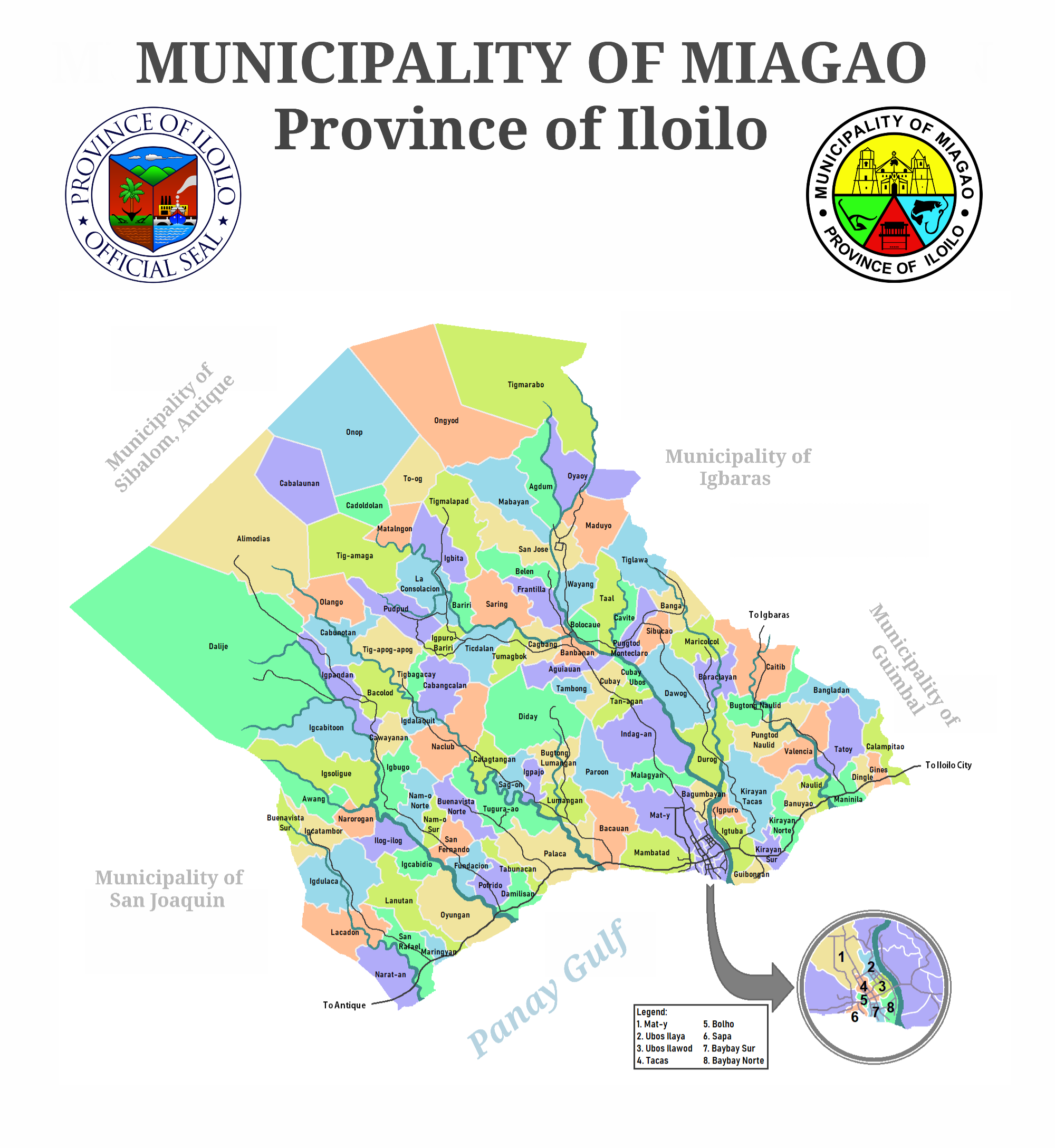
Map of the Municipality of Miagao showing barangay names and boundaries and roads.

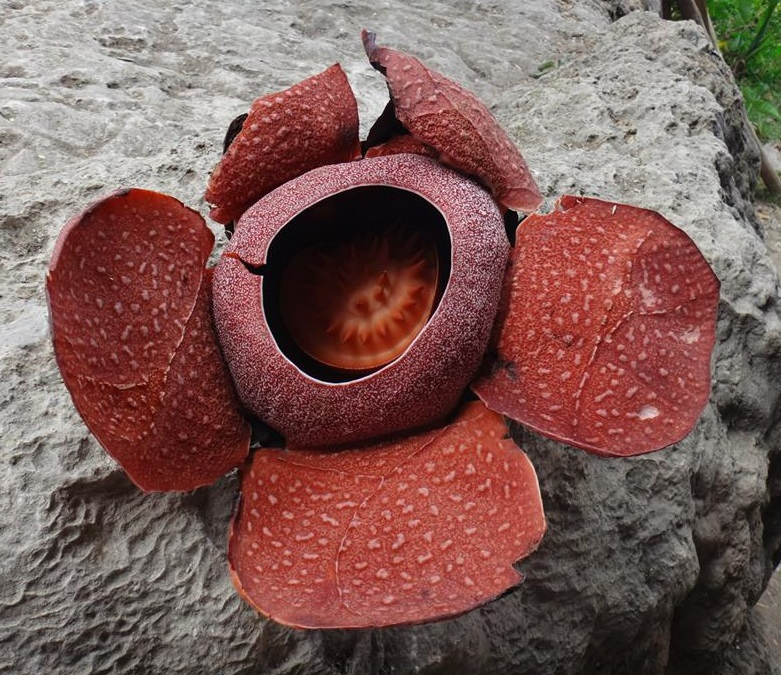
This is a bloom of Rafflesia speciosa found in the mountainous barangays of Miagao.

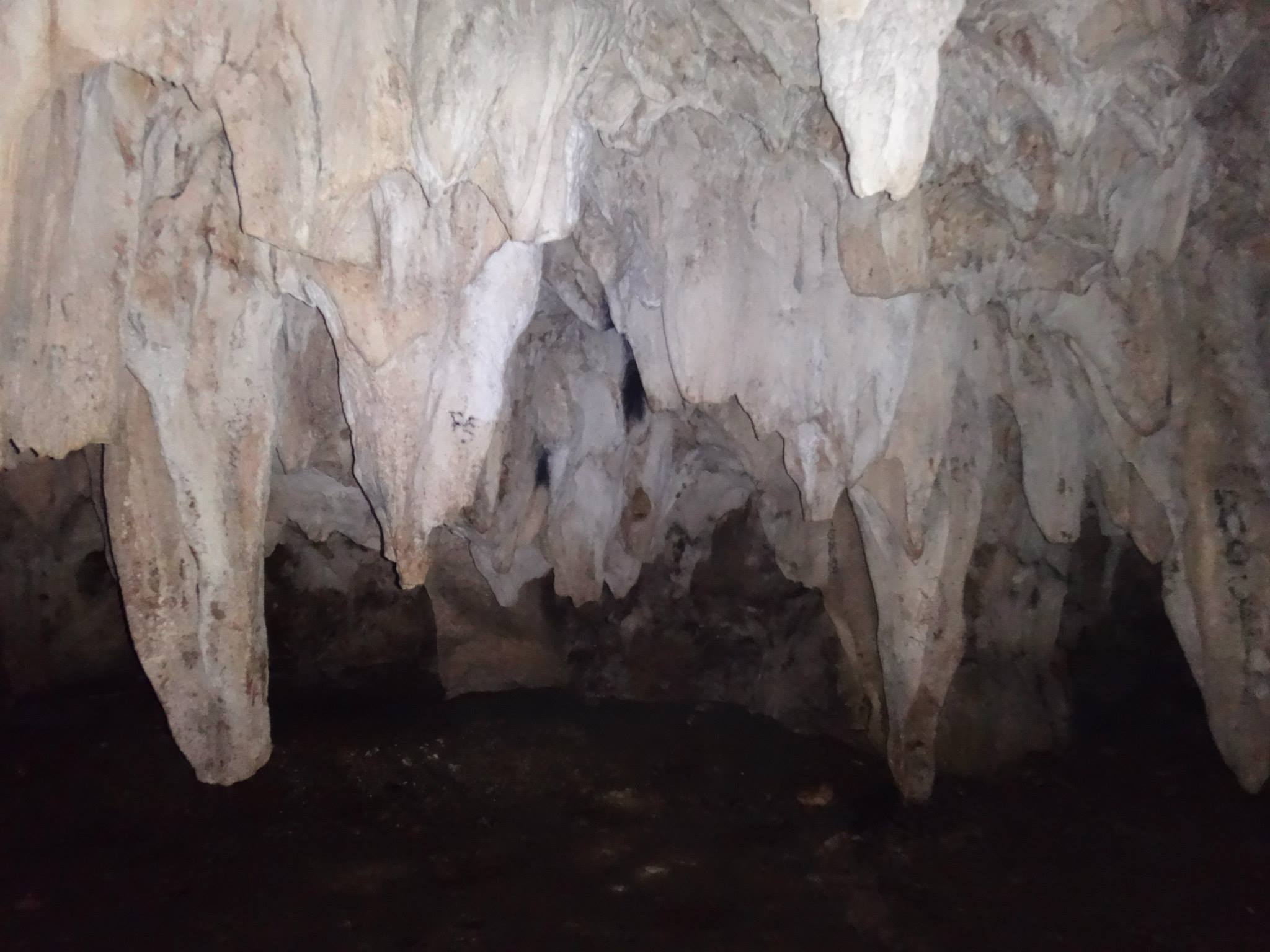
Inside Sinuhotan Cave in Barangay Onop, Miagao, Iloilo

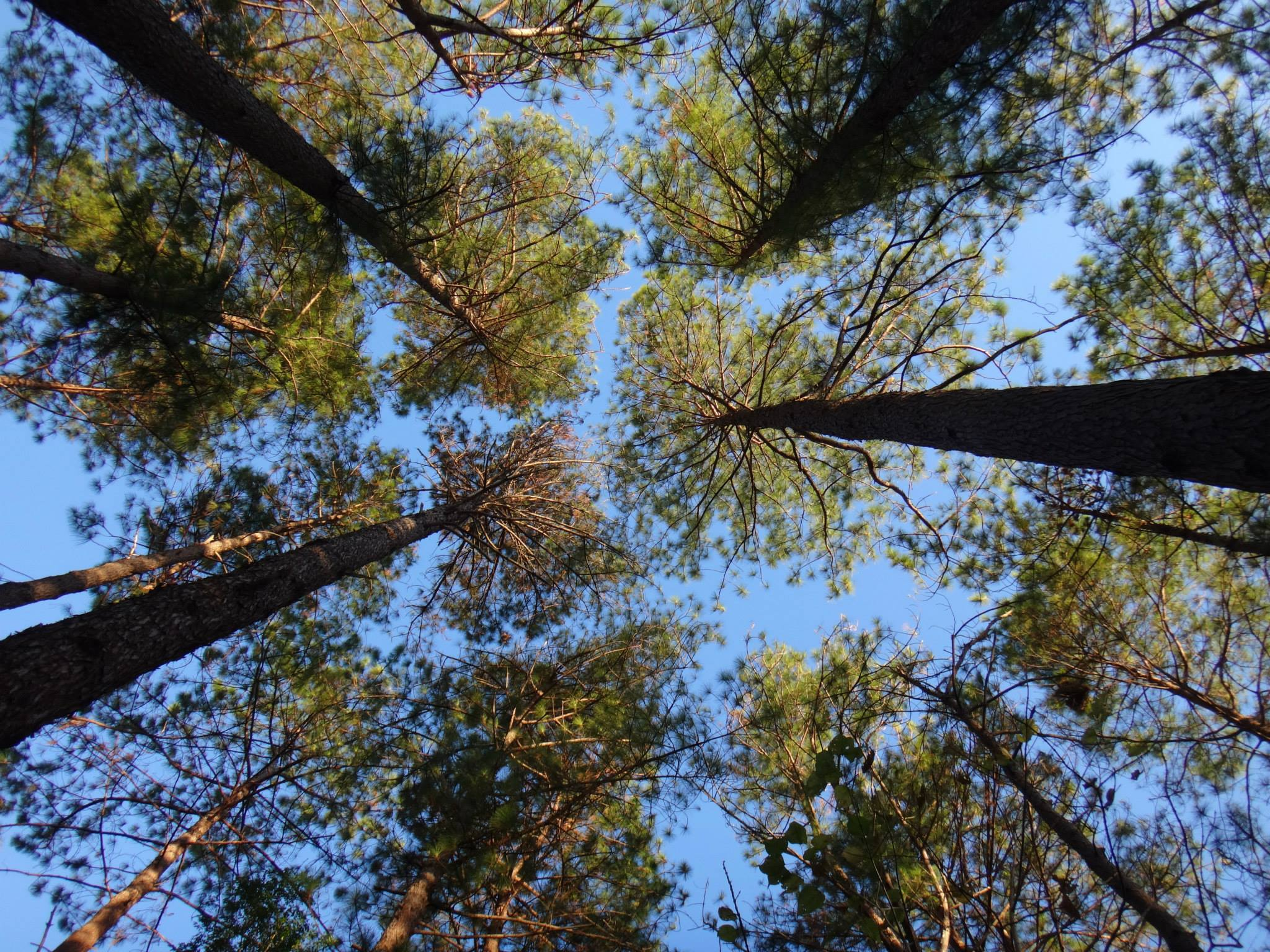
Canopy of the Tulahong Pine Forest in Miagao, Iloilo

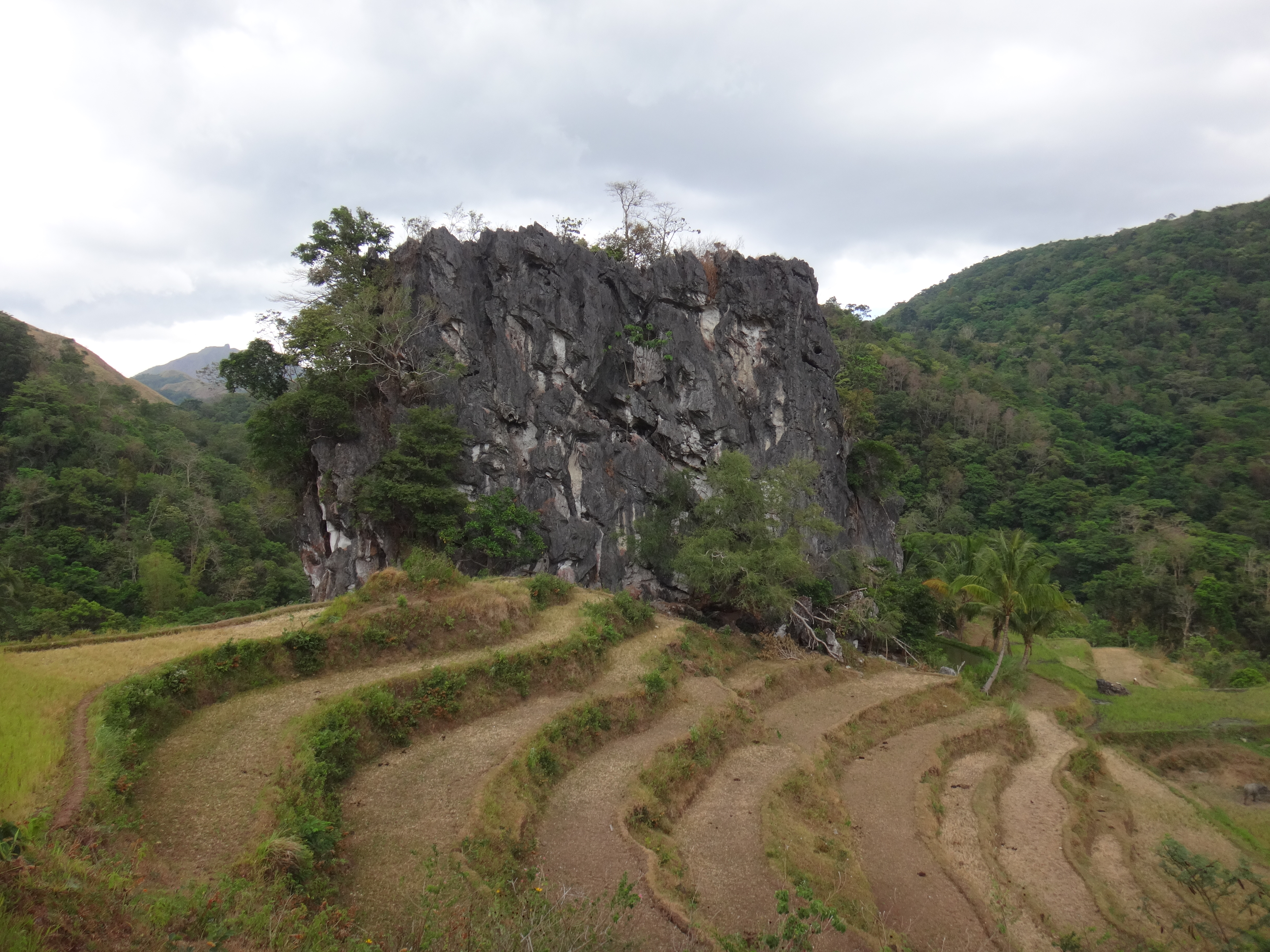
Gui-ob ni Tidoy is a limestone monolith in Miagao, Iloilo near the Tulahong Pine Forest and Tinagong Dagat/Danao.

Miagao is politically subdivided into 119 barangays. Each barangay consists of puroks and some have sitios.

It has more barangays than any other municipality in the Philippines. The municipality has 22 coastal barangays and 97 landlocked barangays.

Name	PSG Code	Population (2015)	Population (2020)	±% p.a.
Agdum	0603030001	345	400	+3.00%
Aguiauan	0603030002	460	481	+0.90%
Alimodias	0603030003	764	652	−3.12%
Awang	0603030004	156	139	−2.28%
Bacauan	0603030006	611	624	+0.42%
Bacolod	0603030007	471	515	+1.80%
Bagumbayan	0603030008	939	988	+1.02%
Banbanan	0603030009	485	419	−2.88%
Banga	0603030010	222	224	+0.18%
Bangladan	0603030011	348	366	+1.01%
Banuyao	0603030012	898	937	+0.85%
Baraclayan	0603030013	400	414	+0.69%
Bariri	0603030014	133	143	+1.46%
Baybay Norte (Poblacion)	0603030015	2932	3013	+0.55%
Baybay Sur (Poblacion)	0603030016	998	969	−0.59%
Belen	0603030017	191	199	+0.82%
Bolho (Poblacion)	0603030018	457	387	−3.27%
Bolocaue	0603030019	195	194	−0.10%
Buenavista Norte	0603030020	385	413	+1.41%
Buenavista Sur	0603030021	291	293	+0.14%
Bugtong Lumangan	0603030022	327	350	+1.37%
Bugtong Naulid	0603030023	203	197	−0.60%
Cabalaunan	0603030024	252	258	+0.47%
Cabangcalan	0603030025	137	144	+1.00%
Cabunotan	0603030026	306	243	−4.51%
Cadoldolan	0603030027	151	113	−5.63%
Cagbang	0603030028	310	321	+0.70%
Caitib	0603030029	634	564	−2.31%
Calagtangan	0603030030	423	481	+2.60%
Calampitao	0603030031	798	826	+0.69%
Cavite	0603030032	209	203	−0.58%
Cawayanan	0603030033	261	285	+1.77%
Cubay	0603030034	753	830	+1.97%
Cubay Ubos	0603030035	162	158	−0.50%
Dalije	0603030036	1809	1627	−2.10%
Damilisan	0603030037	1305	1295	−0.15%
Dawog	0603030038	826	830	+0.10%
Diday	0603030039	760	767	+0.18%
Dingle	0603030040	379	427	+2.41%
Durog	0603030041	1064	1072	+0.15%
Frantilla	0603030042	162	190	+3.24%
Fundacion	0603030043	339	316	−1.40%
Gines	0603030044	685	752	+1.88%
Guibongan	0603030045	977	1089	+2.19%
Igbita	0603030046	324	236	−6.14%
Igbugo	0603030047	505	523	+0.70%
Igcabidio	0603030048	300	322	+1.43%
Igcabito-on	0603030050	344	461	+6.03%
Igcatambor	0603030051	312	326	+0.88%
Igdalaquit	0603030052	205	182	−2.35%
Igdulaca	0603030053	706	708	+0.06%
Igpajo	0603030054	380	332	−2.66%
Igpandan	0603030055	303	317	+0.91%
Igpuro	0603030056	468	538	+2.83%
Igpuro-Bariri	0603030057	304	314	+0.78%
Igsoligue	0603030058	460	452	−0.35%
Igtuba	0603030059	1157	1345	+3.06%
Ilog-ilog	0603030060	233	175	−5.56%
Indag-an	0603030061	694	623	−2.14%
Kirayan Norte	0603030062	1727	1834	+1.21%
Kirayan Sur	0603030063	1440	1475	+0.48%
Kirayan Tacas	0603030064	1087	1376	+4.83%
La Consolacion	0603030065	451	471	+0.87%
Lacadon	0603030066	682	692	+0.29%
Lanutan	0603030067	470	549	+3.16%
Lumangan	0603030068	796	792	−0.10%
Mabayan	0603030069	213	226	+1.19%
Maduyo	0603030070	169	163	−0.72%
Malagyan	0603030071	1409	1641	+3.10%
Mambatad	0603030072	939	982	+0.90%
Maninila	0603030073	1063	1139	+1.39%
Maricolcol	0603030074	339	359	+1.15%
Maringyan	0603030075	674	558	−3.71%
Mat-y (Poblacion)	0603030076	2346	2197	−1.30%
Matalngon	0603030077	161	136	−3.32%
Naclub	0603030078	647	577	−2.26%
Nam-o Sur	0603030079	217	211	−0.56%
Nam-o Norte	0603030080	291	307	+1.08%
Narat-an	0603030082	591	759	+5.13%
Narorogan	0603030083	226	239	+1.12%
Naulid	0603030084	800	820	+0.50%
Olango	0603030085	335	333	−0.12%
Ongyod	0603030086	176	208	+3.40%
Onop	0603030087	291	268	−1.63%
Oya-oy	0603030005	297	308	+0.73%
Oyungan	0603030088	1417	1495	+1.08%
Palaca	0603030089	2142	2178	+0.33%
Paro-on	0603030090	299	130	−15.34%
Potrido	0603030091	403	363	−2.07%
Pudpud	0603030092	514	598	+3.07%
Pungtod Monteclaro	0603030093	302	320	+1.16%
Pungtod Naulid	0603030094	171	161	−1.20%
Sag-on	0603030095	390	332	−3.17%
San Fernando	0603030096	428	464	+1.63%
San Jose	0603030097	466	439	−1.19%
San Rafael	0603030098	1303	1204	−1.57%
Sapa (Poblacion)	0603030099	822	679	−3.75%
Saring	0603030100	416	422	+0.29%
Sibucao	0603030101	338	371	+1.88%
Taal	0603030102	197	191	−0.62%
Tabunacan	0603030103	514	504	−0.39%
Tacas (Poblacion)	0603030104	759	747	−0.32%
Tambong	0603030105	205	188	−1.72%
Tan-agan	0603030106	556	569	+0.46%
Tatoy	0603030107	605	647	+1.35%
Ticdalan	0603030108	425	312	−5.99%
Tig-amaga	0603030109	252	228	−1.98%
Tig-Apog-Apog	0603030110	281	257	−1.77%
Tigbagacay	0603030111	274	230	−3.44%
Tiglawa	0603030112	183	165	−2.05%
Tigmalapad	0603030113	528	521	−0.27%
Tigmarabo	0603030114	451	505	+2.29%
To-og	0603030115	157	134	−3.12%
Tugura-ao	0603030116	314	304	−0.65%
Tumagboc	0603030117	415	442	+1.27%
Ubos Ilawod (Poblacion)	0603030118	1003	800	−4.42%
Ubos Ilaya (Poblacion)	0603030119	896	918	+0.49%
Valencia	0603030120	465	475	+0.43%
Wayang	0603030121	229	240	+0.94%

== Demographics ==
Population census of Miagao
Year	Pop.	±% p.a.
1903	20,656	—
1918	24,556	+1.16%
1939	30,179	+0.99%
1948	30,143	−0.01%
1960	32,117	+0.53%
1970	37,585	+1.58%
1975	40,603	+1.56%
1980	45,816	+2.44%
1990	51,738	+1.22%
1995	52,276	+0.19%
2000	57,092	+1.91%
2007	60,498	+0.80%
2010	64,545	+2.38%
2015	67,565	+0.87%
2020	68,115	+0.17%
2024	68,163	+0.02%
Source: Philippine Statistics Authority

In the 2024 census, the population of Miagao was 68,163 people, with a density of 430 inhabitants per square kilometre or 1,100 inhabitants per square mile.

=== Languages ===
Almost all people in Miag-ao speak Kinaray-a as it is the primary language of the municipality. Hiligaynon is spoken as a second language by many and is especially useful when going to Iloilo City where Hiligaynon is the dominant language.

== Healthcare ==
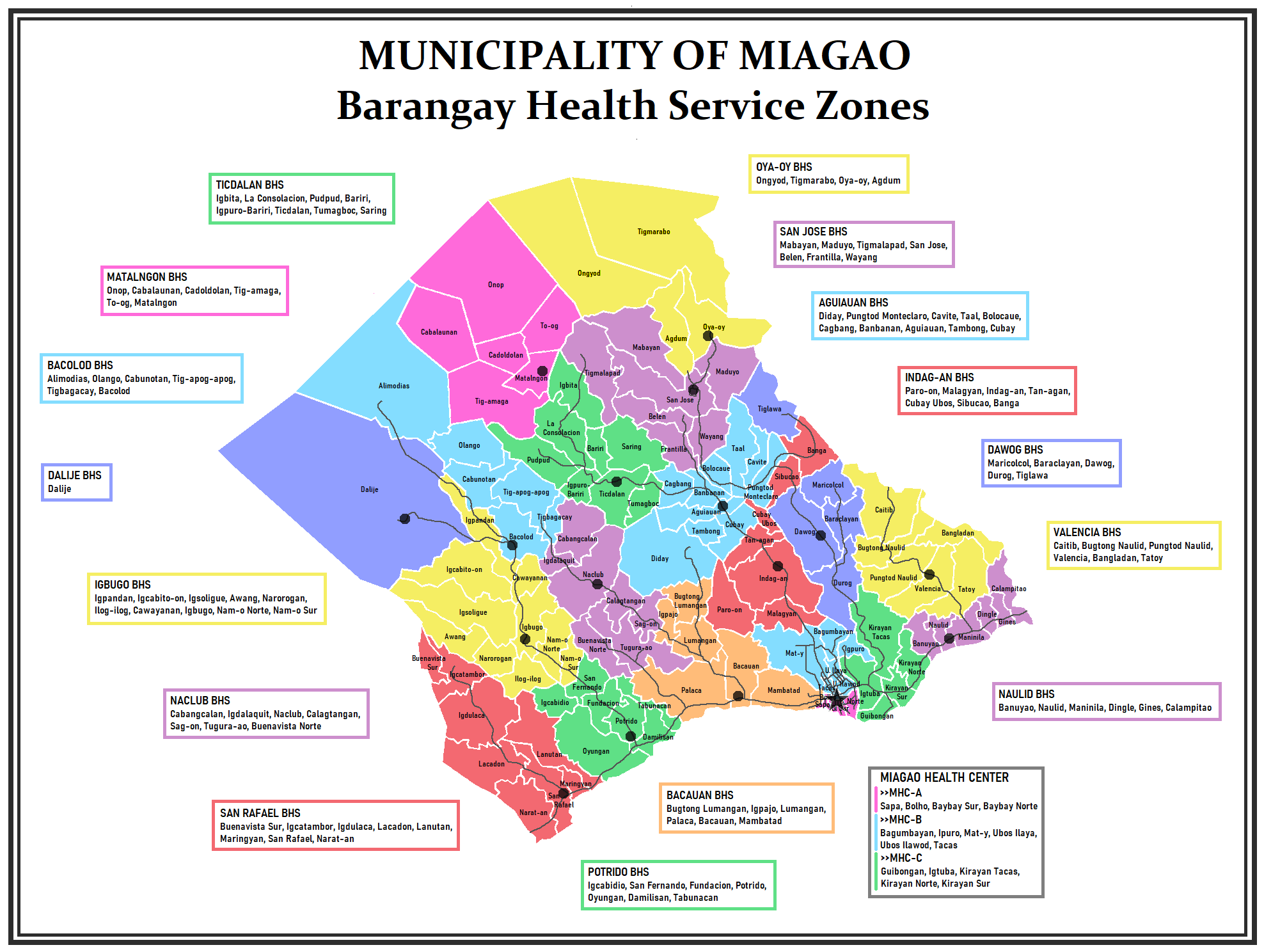
Barangay Health Service (BHS) Zones of the Municipality of Miagao, Iloilo

The municipality's healthcare services is under the management of the Miagao Municipal Health Office (MHO), headed by its Municipal Health Officer, Rural Health Physicians, Nurses, Midwives, and other allied health workers and staff. The MHO is directly under the administration of the Local Government Unit.

The Municipal Health Office ensures that the delivery of basic services and provisions of adequate facilities relative to health services provided under Section 17 of the Universal Healthcare Law of the Philippines (Population-based Health Services) are effectively implemented.

The main components of the Municipal Health Office include the following:

- MHO Office including the headquarters of its different health programs
- First-aid Clinic
- Out-patient Clinic
- Birthing Clinic
- Animal Bite Treatment Center
- DOTS Center and COVID-19 Swabbing Center
- The 19 Barangay Health Stations (BHS) spread across the municipality
  - The Main Health Center (MHC) caters to three BHS, namely: MHC-A, MHC-B, and MHC-C

There are also other private medical, dental and veterinary clinics, laboratories, and pharmacies located primarily in the poblacion area.

== Economy ==
Poverty incidence of Miagao (%)

Source: Philippine Statistics Authority

=== Agriculture ===
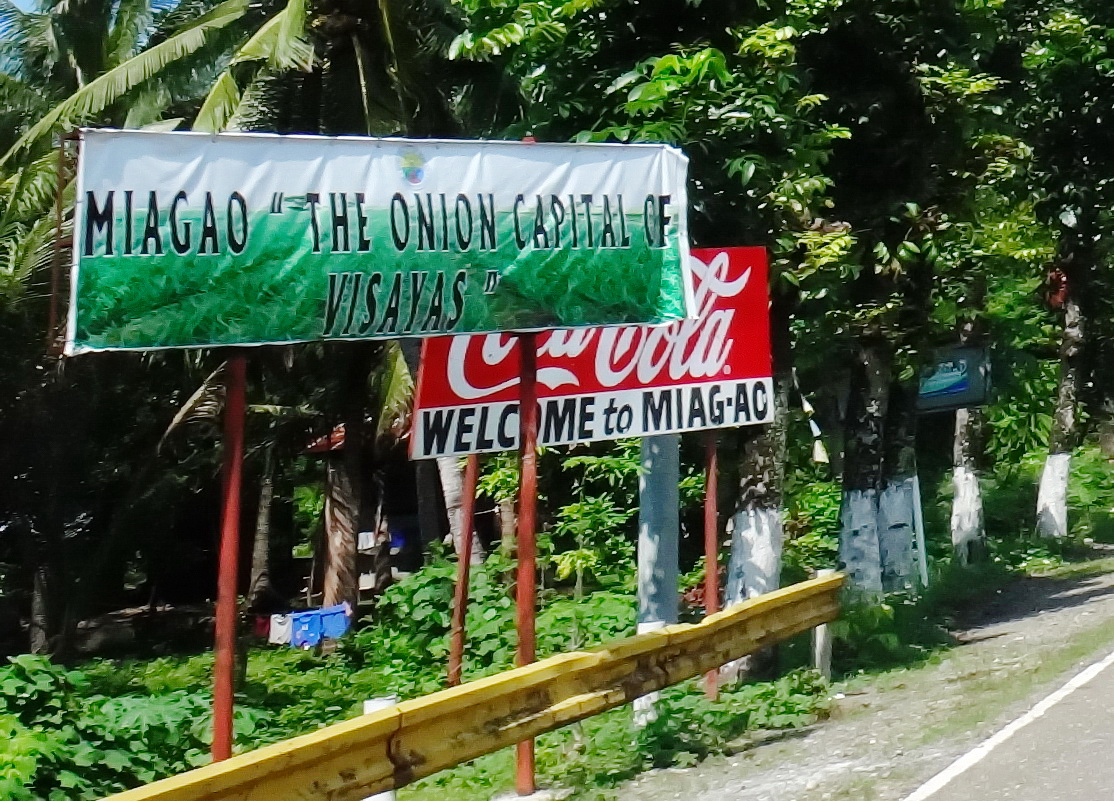
A road sign seen upon entering the first barangay (Barangay Calampitao) of the Municipality of Miagao from Iloilo City.

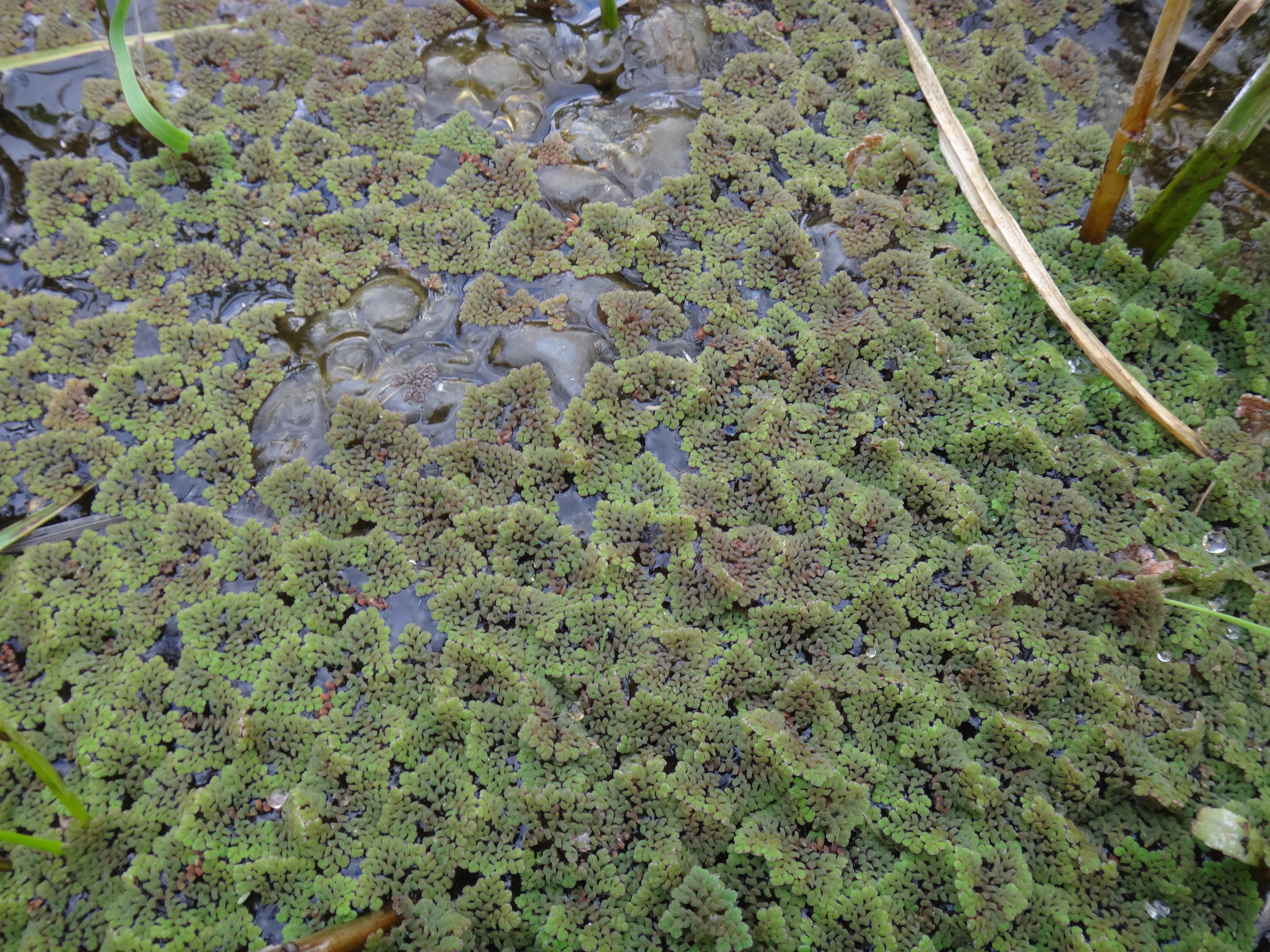
Azolla or water fern, a known biofertilizer, freely grows in the submerged rice paddies in the upland barangays of Miagao.

The municipality of Miagao is a largely agricultural town. Around 52% of the municipal land area is classified as agricultural and around 40% of the total land area is planted. Rice is the primary crop of the town while corn is considered as a secondary crop.

Miagao is hailed as the "Onion Capital of the Visayas" because it is the largest producer of bulb onion not only in Western Visayas but in the whole Visayas and Mindanao. In 2022, 92% of the region's onion production was produced by the municipality of Miagao which targets to further increase production by expanding the plantation area.

Other crops produced by the municipality include eggplants, peanuts, monggo, tomatoes, root crops, and bamboo.

=== Banks ===
Miagao is a financial center in southern Iloilo. The town has a total of five banks.

== Infrastructure ==
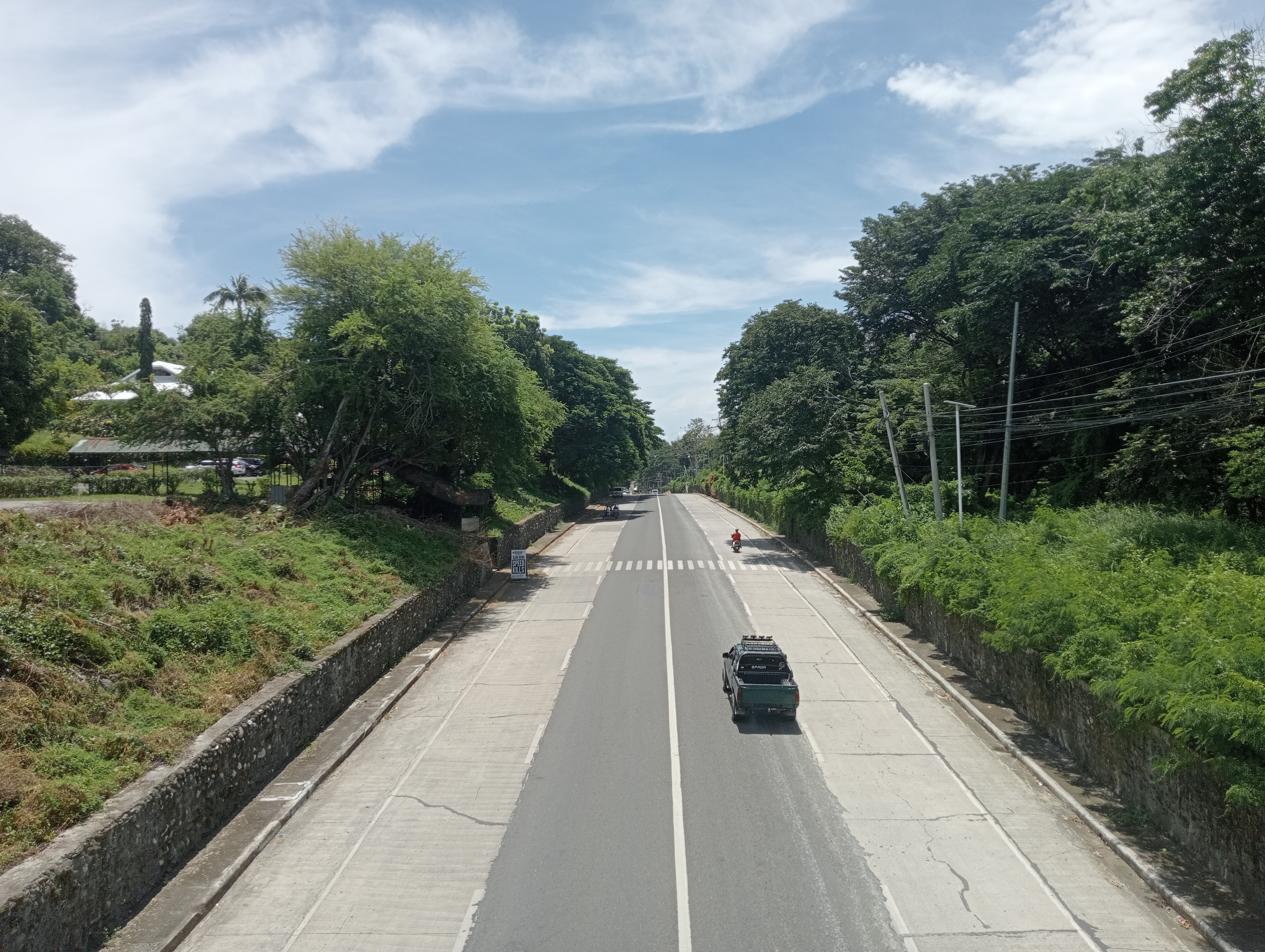
Iloilo-Antique Road in Miagao

=== Public Transport ===
Miagao is strategically located along the Iloilo-Antique road. Because of this, transportation is not a big problem in the municipality. The town proper is 40 kilometres (25 mi) from Iloilo City and 57 kilometres (35 mi) from San Jose de Buenavista, the capital of Antique.

==== Buses ====
Several bus companies operate in Miagao. Buses that ply the Iloilo-Antique, Iloilo-Caticlan via San Jose, and Iloilo-Manila routes pass by the municipality every day. Ceres Liner by Vallacar Transit passes by Miagao almost every 30 minutes on its way to Iloilo from Antique and vice versa.

Manila bound buses also pass by Miagao. Dimple Star Transport, Gasat/Valisno Transport, and Ceres Liner pass by Miagao every morning on their way to Manila. In addition, RM Liner also heads to Manila everyday but passes by Miagao early in the evening.

==== Jeepneys ====
Jeepneys serve the Miagao-Iloilo City route more frequently than buses. The typical jeepney can contain around 22 to as many as 34 or more passengers. The town is mainly served by Miagao-Iloilo City bound jeepneys but San Joaquin-Iloilo City bound jeepneys also serve the area. These jeepneys generally pass by every 10–20 minutes so catching a jeepney bound for Iloilo City is not a problem. Several mountain barangays of Miagao are also served by jeepneys because smaller modes of transportation aren't usually strong enough to climb steep and unpaved roads. In that case, habal-habal or plain motorcycles can also be used.

Jeepneys serving the hinterlands of the municipality include regular routes from the poblacion area to the following barangays:

- Miagao - Tiglawa/Banga via Banbanan/Cavite
- Miagao - San Jose via Banbanan
- Miagao - Tigmarabo via Banbanan/Oya-oy
- Miagao - Tig-amaga/Pudpud via Ticdalan
- Miagao - Tigmalapad/Igbita
- Miagao - Bacolod (barangay)
- Miagao - Dalije via Bacolod
- Miagao - Alimodias via Olango/Bacolod (rainy season) or via Pudpud (dry season)
- Miagao - Tigbagacay/Naclub
- Miagao - Maricolcol/Baraclayan

==== Tricycles ====
Tricycles are the most common form transportation in the municipality. These are the Philippines' version of tuk-tuk in other Asian countries. Tricycles are often limited to operate within the municipality but special and private trips to other places are allowed. Miagao has established several tricycle routes in the municipality. Tricycles are color-coded to indicate the route assigned to them. Yellow ones are northbound while blue ones are southbound. Green tricycles are bound to the mountain barangays of the town passing through barangay Mat-y. Tricycles assigned to operate within the town proper are colored red. The following table shows the routes of all tricycles-for-hire within the municipality of Miagao.

From	To	From	To	From	To	From	To
Miagao	Ubos Area	Miagao	Damilisan	Miagao	Tan-agan	Miagao	Naulid
Miagao	Baybay Area	Miagao	Narat-an	Miagao	Banbanan	Miagao	Calampitao
Miagao	Sapa and UPV Area	Miagao	Calagtangan	Miagao	Ticdalan	Miagao	Caitib
Miagao	Malagyan	Miagao	Tugura-ao/Gines Palaca	Miagao	La Consolacion	Miagao	Dawog
Miagao	Bagumbayan	Miagao	Igbugo/Cawayanan			Miagao	Igpuro
		Miagao	Ilog-ilog			Miagao	Guibongan
		Miagao	Igdulaca				

== Government ==
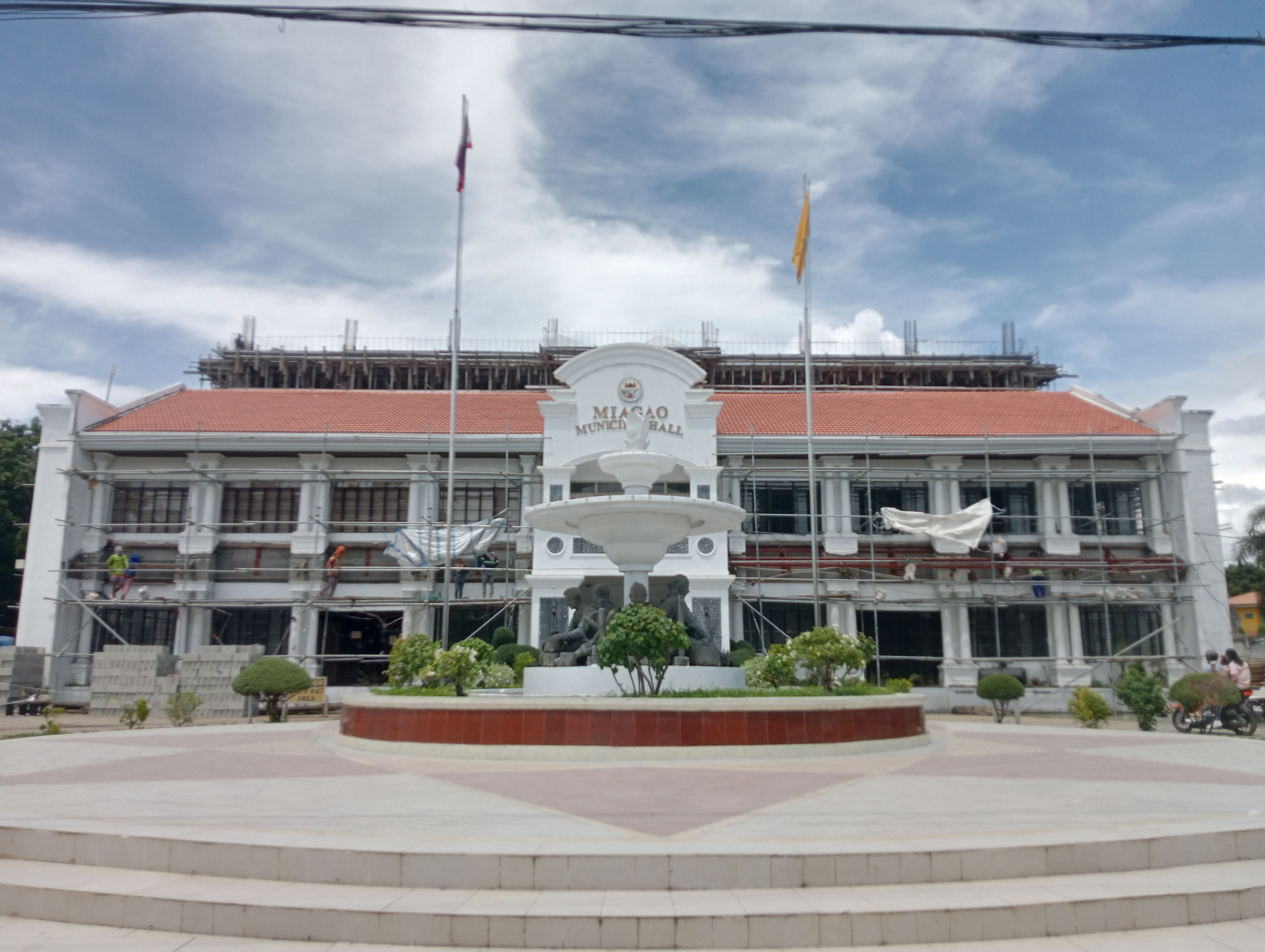
Miagao Municipal Hall

As with other municipal/city level political administration in the country, Miagao is governed by popularly elected Mayor, Vice Mayor, and eight Sangguniang Bayan (SB) Members. The current government officials of the municipality are listed below.

=== Elected officials ===
Members of the municipal council (2022-2028):

- Mayor: Oscar "Richard" S. Garin Jr.
- Vice Mayor: Macario Napulan
- SB Members:
  - Japhet Grace N. Moleta
  - Jun Carlu A. Napulan
  - Gemma Rei S. Nismal
  - Aaron M. Noble
  - Cezar N. Florece
  - Mario Thomas Nicolas P. Torrecampo
  - Ma. Salve N. Pechayco
  - Richard E. Esposo
- Ex-Officio Member
  - Marlou R. Niones (LNB President)
  - Carlo Miguel Paguntalan (SK Federation President)

== Highlights ==
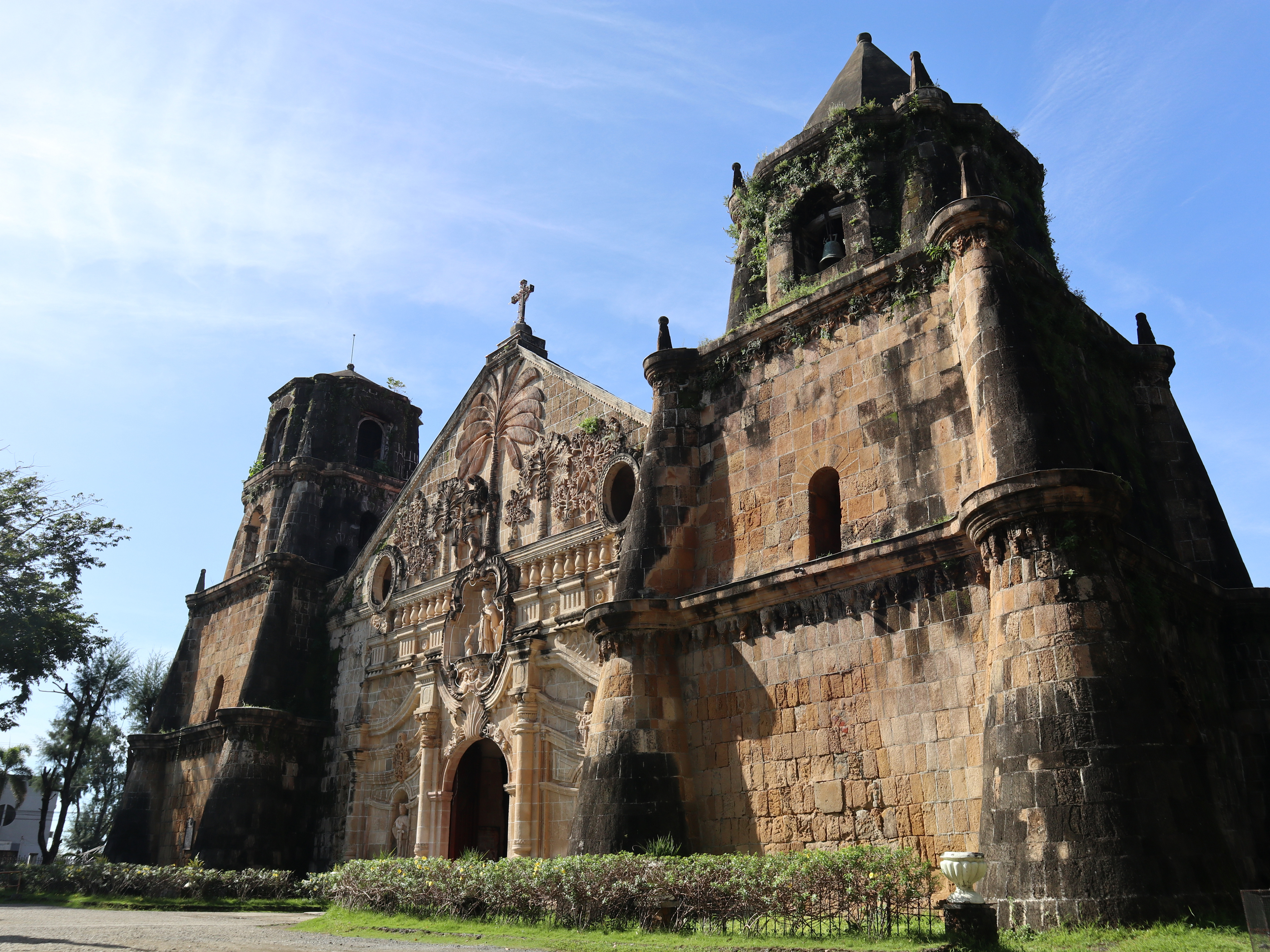
The Miagao Church

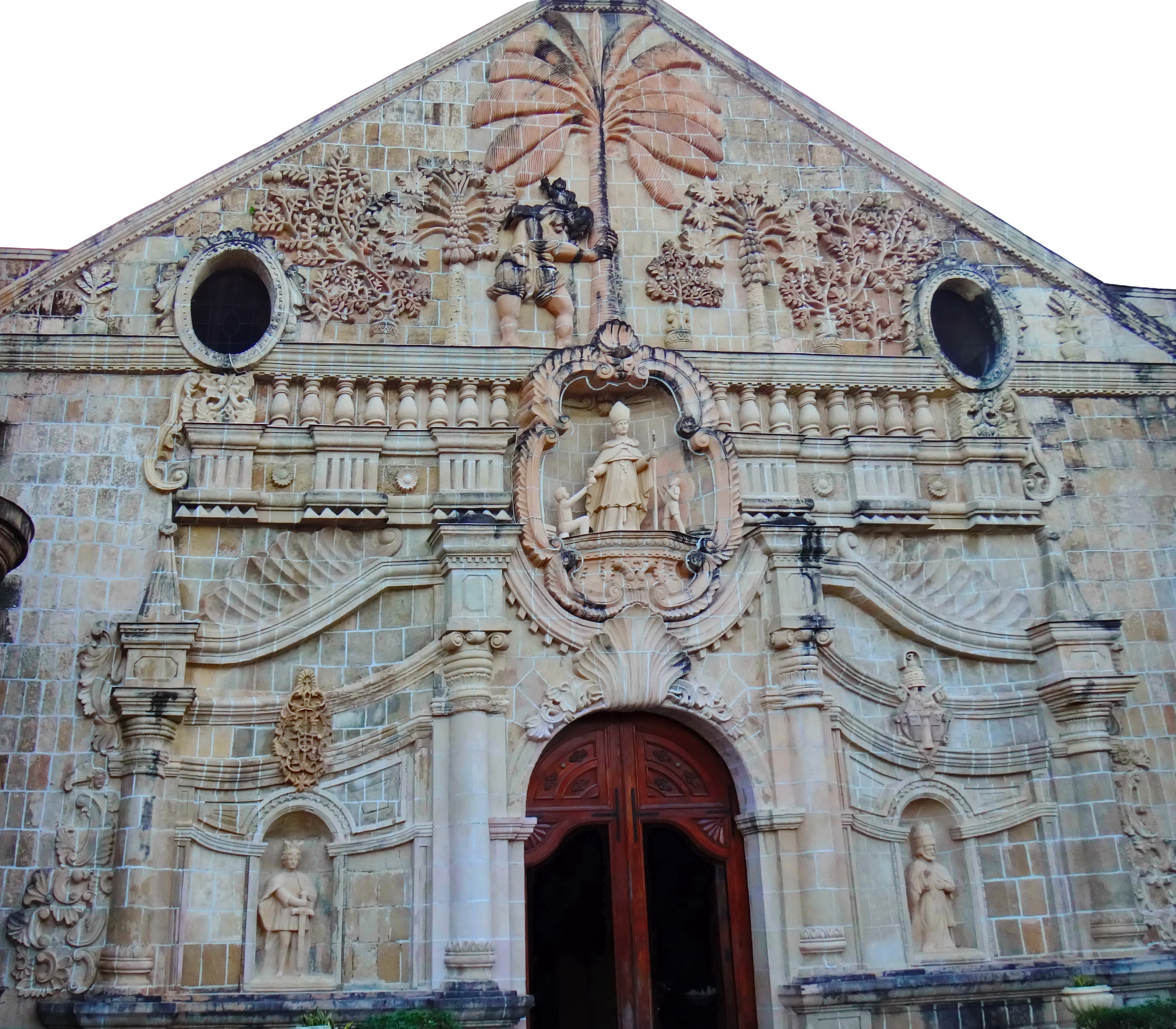
Closeup view of the whole facade of Miagao Church showing its intricate baroque design with a touch of the native culture.

=== Miag-ao Church ===
The Miagao Church, or the Church of Santo Tomas de Villanueva, was built in 1786 by Spanish Augustinian missionaries and was declared as part of the UNESCO World Heritage Site "Baroque Churches of the Philippines" in 1993. On the front facade, which is flanked by two watchtower belfries, one can see the unique blending of Spanish and native influences.

The central feature of the bas-relief facade is a large coconut tree which reaches almost to the apex. While an integral part of the Philippine landscape, the coconut tree is also the subject of lore. According to an old Philippine legend, the coconut tree was the only bequest from a loving mother to her two children, a tree which sustained them for life. On the church's facade the coconut tree appears as the "tree of life" to which St. Christopher carrying the Child Jesus on his shoulder is clinging to. The lesser facades feature the daily life of Miagaowanons during the time. Also depicted are other native flora and fauna, as well as native dress.

The church and its watchtowers were also built to defend the town and its people against raids by the Moro people. It therefore has thick walls and, reportedly, secret passages. Indeed, stretching along the Iloilo coast are defensive towers, but none that equal the size of the Miagao. It is because of this defensive purpose that it is sometimes referred to as the Miag-ao Fortress Church.

== Education ==
The primary and secondary education in the municipality of Miagao is under the jurisdiction of the Division of Iloilo under the Department of Education Region 6. Miagao is subdivided into two school districts namely, Miagao East and Miagao West. The schools under each district as well as private, secondary, and tertiary schools in the municipality are listed below.

=== Elementary education ===
Miagao East elementary schools:

- Aguiauan ES
- Bacauan-Mambatad ES
- Guibongan-Igtuba ES
- Indag-an-Tanagan ES
- Kirayan ES
- La Consolacion ES
- Malagyan ES
- Miagao (East) Central ES
- Miranda ES
- Monteclaro ES
- Pungtod-Caitib ES
- San Jose ES
- Ticdalan ES
- Tigmarabo ES
- Valencia ES

Miagao West elementary schools:

- Alimodias ES
- Bacolod ES
- Cadoldolan ES
- Dalije ES
- Diday ES
- Igbita-Tigmalapad ES
- Igdulaca ES
- Igpajo ES
- Ilog-ilog ES
- Jesus Nievales Memorial ES
- Miagao West Central ES
- Naclub ES
- Olango ES
- Oyungan ES
- San Fernando ES
- San Rafael ES

Private primary schools:

- Kaunlaran Learning Center (KLC)
- Acorn Dale Montessori
- Jophiel the Archangel Academy

=== Secondary education ===
Secondary schools:

- Alejandro Firmeza Memorial NHS
- Bacolod NHS
- Kirayan NHS
- Miagao NHS
- Palaca-Damilisan NHS
- San Jose NHS
- San Rafael NHS
- Supt. Arsenio M. Napud Memorial NHS

Private secondary schools:

- Doanne Christian Fellowship Academy
- Kaunlaran Integrated School Foundation INC
- St. Louise de Marillac School of Miagao

=== Colleges and universities ===
University of the Philippines Visayas

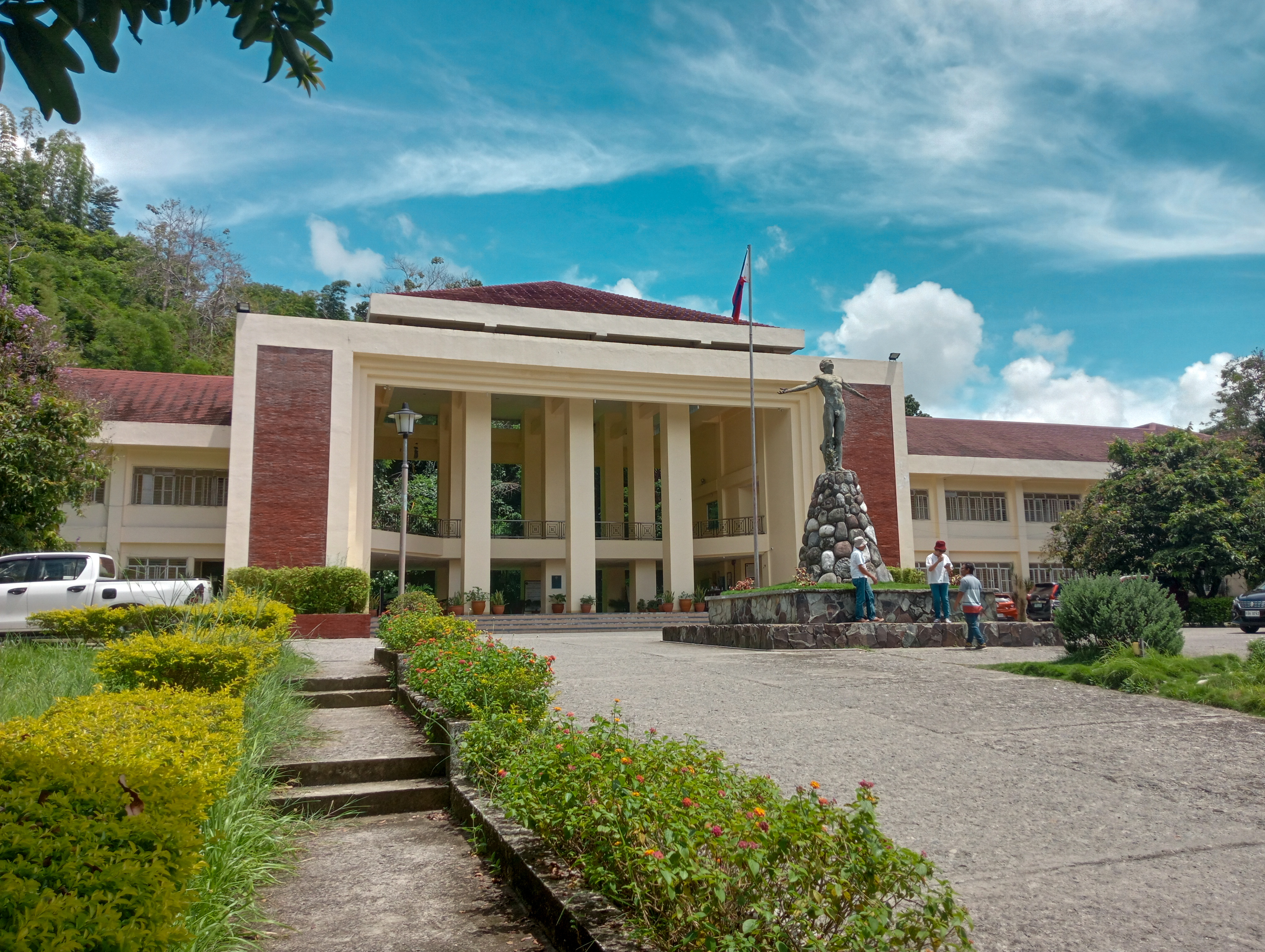
UP Visayas administration building

The Miagao campus of the University of the Philippines Visayas (UPV) spreads out over 12 km^{2} on the outskirts of the town proper. This is the main campus of UPV which is composed of the UPV College of Management (CM) in Iloilo City, UPV High School in Iloilo (UPVHSI) in Iloilo City, UPV College of Arts and Sciences (CAS), UPV School of Technology (SoTech), and the flagship college of this campus, the UPV College of Fisheries and Ocean Sciences (CFOS) which focuses on marine science, aquaculture, fish processing, natural products development, and post-harvest/food science. In the late 1970s and early 1980s, Thailand and Cambodia sent exchange students to the school to study fish and rice production, and after graduating returned home where they began out-producing and out-exporting the Philippines in these commodities.

Iloilo Science and Technology University - Miagao Campus

The Iloilo Science and Technology University - Miagao Campus (formerly Southern Iloilo Polytechnic College) is one of the tertiary institutions in the municipality. The college started as Miagao Regional High School in 1945 and became the Miagao Vocational School in 1958. In 1984, Miagao Vocational School was converted to Southern Iloilo Polytechnic College (SIPC) to meet the demands of the changing times and for expansion purposes. SIPC was then integrated to Western Visayas College of Science and Technology (now Iloilo Science and Technology University) on November 24, 2000, by virtue of the Republic Act(RA) No. 7722, otherwise known as the “Higher Education Act of 1994 and RA No. 8292". Currently, the school offers courses in the fields of electronics and technology, hospitality, and primary and secondary education.

== Media ==
- DYUP-FM 102.7
- DYUP-AM 873
- Hot-FM Miag-ao
- Falconite – FM/AM Miagao

== See also ==
- Baroque Churches of the Philippines
- Organization of World Heritage Cities
