= Murattu Kaalai =

Murattu Kaalai (lit. 'Rogue Bull') may refer to these Indian films:

- Murattu Kaalai (1980 film), a Tamil-language film directed by S. P. Muthuraman
- Murattu Kaalai (2012 film), a Tamil-language film directed by K. Selva Bharathy

== See also ==
- Raging Bull (disambiguation)
