= Tlacotalpan =

- Town
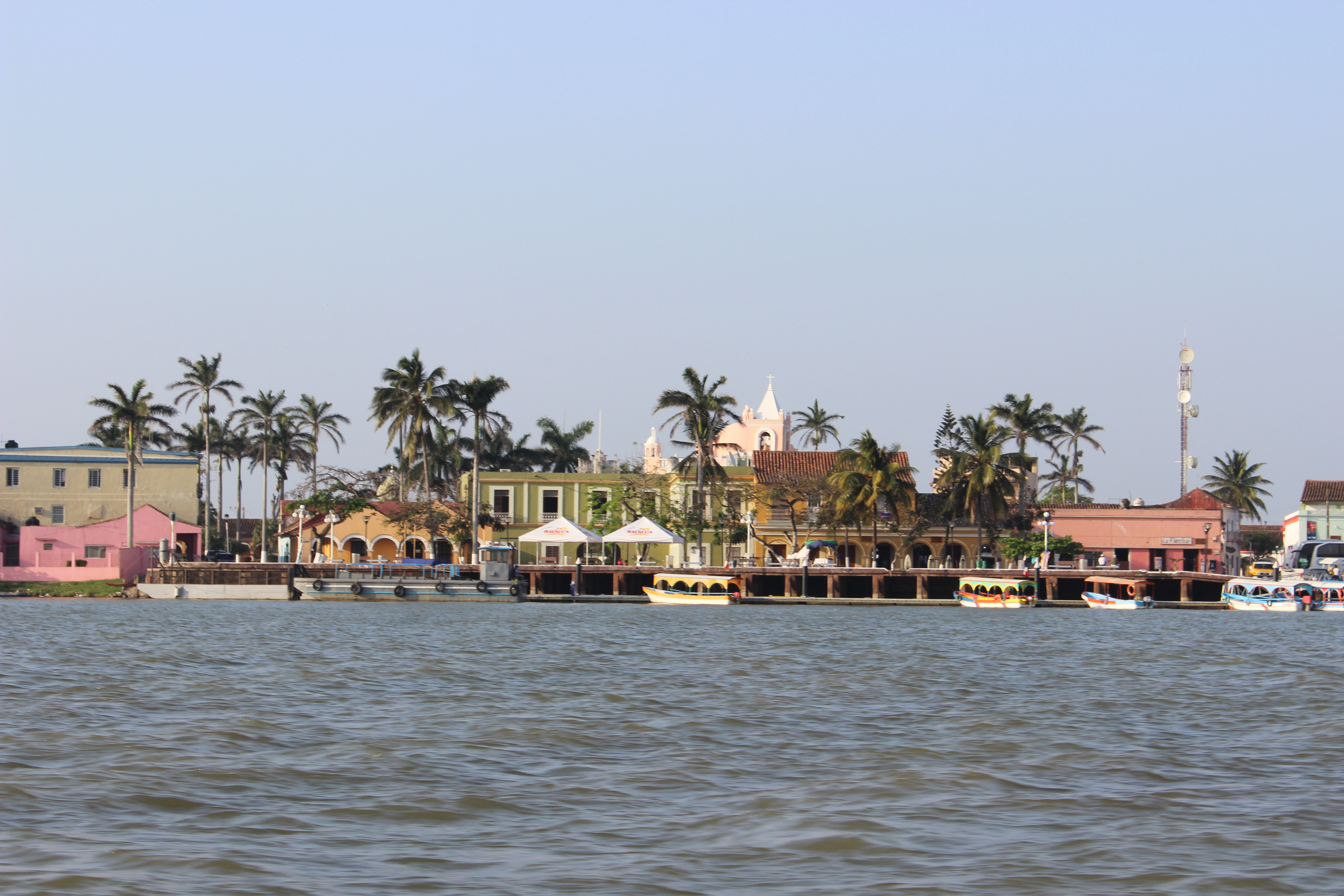
- Tlacotalpan seen from the Papaloapan river

- Location within Veracruz Location within Mexico
- Coordinates: 18°37′N 95°40′W
- Country: Mexico
- State: Veracruz
- Region: Papaloapan Region
- Municipality: Tlacotalpan
- Town status: 1847
- City status: 9 May 1865
- Elevation: 10 m (33 ft)

Population (2020)
  - Total: 7,287
- Time zone: UTC-6 (Central (US Central))
- Website: Municipio de Tlacotalpan

UNESCO World Heritage Site
- Official name: Historic Monuments Zone of Tlacotalpan
- Criteria: Cultural: ii, iv
- Reference: 862
- Inscription: 1998 (22nd Session)
- Area: 75 ha (190 acres)
- Buffer zone: 320 ha (790 acres)

Tlacotalpan is a city in Tlacotalpan Municipality in the Mexican state of Veracruz, declared a World Heritage Site by UNESCO in 1998 primarily for its architecture and colonial-era layout. The town was established in 1550 on what was originally an island in the Papaloapan River. From the colonial era to the 20th century, it was an important port, one of few interior river ports in Latin America. However, with the construction of the railroad, Tlacotalpan's importance faded. Starting in the latter 20th century, efforts to conserve the city's Spanish/Caribbean architecture and layout began, culminating in World Heritage status. Today, its main economic support is fishing and tourism, especially to the annual feast in honor of Our Lady of Candlemas.

== The town ==
It is nicknamed the "pearl of the Papaloapan."

Tlacotalpan is distinct among most urban settlements in Latin America as it is a river port set back from the ocean. It is a World Heritage Site because of its layout, architecture, history and traditions. The urban layout and architecture date back to the 17th century, and the town has mostly conserved both. The layout is a checkboard, covering 153 blocks on 75 hectares. This is divided into two sections: a "Spanish" section in the west and a smaller "native" one in the east, separated by a public area with commercial and official buildings along with some public spaces. The Spanish section of town is characterized by wide streets that parallel the Papaloapan River and connected by narrow lanes. Through this area, there are parks, and public spaces with mature trees, such as the Parque Hidalgo, noted for wandering musicians and Plazuela de Doña Maria, just east of the center, in the oldest section of town, surrounded by workshops that make furniture, musical instruments and other fine wood products. The architecture is characterized by one and two-story colonnaded houses Andalucian style inner courtyards, Caribbean-style arches, red-tile roofs and colorful facades, some of which date to the 18th century. These are particularly abundant in the San Miguelito and La Candelaria neighborhoods. Many of the houses still retain their interior layout and even traditional furnishings.

Although past its heyday in the 19th century, Tlacotalpan is still classified as a river port by the Mexican government, mostly serving fishing boats and small naval patrols. It has a 160-meter-long cement dock, and a boardwalk along the river, much of it lined with restaurants.

Set back slightly from the riverfront is the main square, called Plaza Zaragoza. It is laid out in white marble and dotted with palm trees. In the center, there is a 19th-century kiosk designed by local sculptor Francisco Sanchez Terán.

The main landmark along this plaza is the Sanctuary of Our Lady of Candlemas (Nuestra Señora de la Candelaria) on the north side. This church was built in the late 18th century (starting 1770) under Juan de Medina using stone brought from reefs in the Gulf of Mexico to house the Virgin Mary image inside, brought by sailors to the town in the 17th century. The city's main annual celebration fills this church with candles and flowers.

The other church along the plaza is the San Cristóbal Parish, which dates from 1849. It is Neoclassical with some Moorish influence, which a clock in its tower said to have come from England over two centuries ago. Its main altarpieces inside is sculpted from wood and contains a notable image of Our Lady of Guadalupe. There is also in important altar dedicated to Jesus in the side chapel next to the main altar area.

However, neither the sanctuary nor the parish is the oldest standing church in the town. This is the San Miguelito Church, located at the Plaza de las Madres. It was constructed in 1785 during the height of Baroque in Mexico.

The last main structure at Plaza Zaragoza is the municipal palace. It was constructed in 1849 and contains various oil paintings by Salvador Ferrando as well as an archive of documents that date back to the colonial period.

Just east of the Sanctuary is a small plaza called the Plazuela Agustín Lara, named for a statue here of the songwriter. The Casa Artesanal Rafaela Murillo de Barbero is on the south side of this plaza, which used to be the municipal jail. Today it contains finely embroidered dresses, blouses, men's traditional suits and wood furniture and other products. The Salvador Ferrando Museum is located on the east side, dedicated to a painter and pioneer in the preservation of Veracruz's cultural heritage, in a house that belonged to him. The museum contains works by the artist and others along with antiques from his time period.

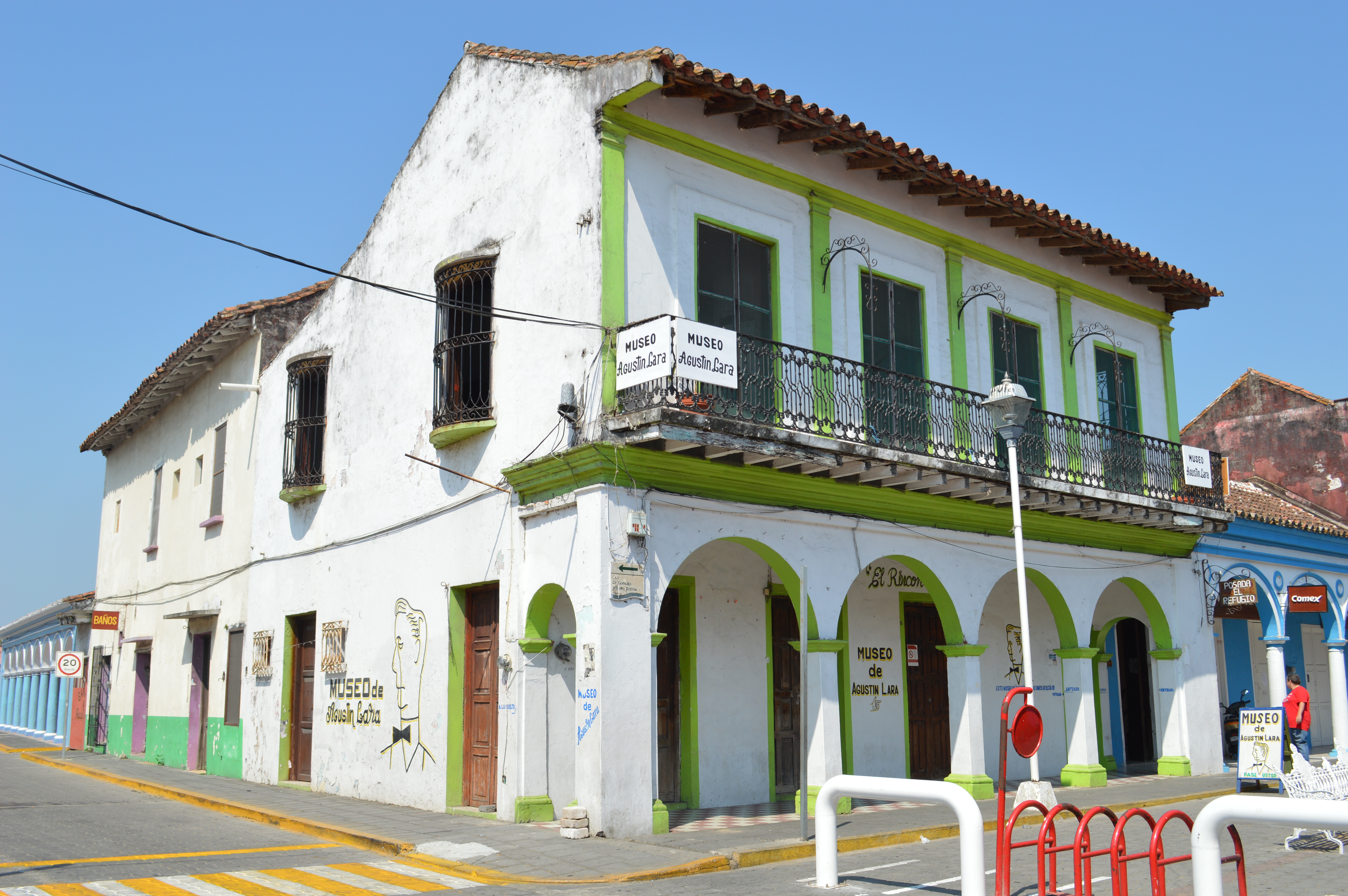
View of the Agustín Lara House Museum

The Agustín Lara House Museum is located on Gonzalo Aguirre Beltrán Street east of the main plaza and is one of the most active cultural centers. It is dedicated to the songwriter and poet who lived much of his life in the town. It contains photographs and objects related to Lara and his career along with some of other important area artists such as Salvador Ferrando, Alberto Fuster and the more contemporary Eric Arana. Another landmark linked to Lara's life is the Blanca Nieves Cantina, also known as the Museum Bar of Tobías Carbajal Rivera. It was a favorite hangout of the songwriter, where he drank the local alcoholic beverage called "toritos" with friends. It has been in business for over sixty years, but originally called El Encango de Tobías. Its current name, "Snow White" in Spanish, comes from Lara himself, as a tribute to then-owner Tobías Carbajal and his seven children. The museum section of the bar contain the only statue of Lara depicted in a guayabera and palm fond hat.

The town's cultural center is also named after Lara (Casa de Cultura Agustín Lara). Located on Venustiano Carranza Avenue, its serves as a meeting place for artists, musicians and dancers, offering classes in traditional Veracruz zapateado dance and various instruments. It also has a permanent exhibition of items related to Lara, along with paintings by Salvador Ferrando and Alberto Fuster.

The Nezahuacoyotl Theater is also on Venustiano Carranza, constructed in 1891 in French style during the Porfirio Díaz period.

One other house converted into an attraction is the "mini zoo." The structure and collection belonged to Pío Barrán. It houses a collection of objects and animals, especially from the making of movies that Barrán collected over his lifetime, including a notable collection related to Agustín Lara. The most unusual aspect of the site is the collection of exotic animals, a number of which run free on the property. The collection includes crocodiles, turtles, pelicans and birds of prey.

The Jardín del Arte Tlacotalpeño (Tlacotalpan Art Garden) exhibits and sells works by artists in the region. It is located just south of the main square.

== The Music ==
In the intense festive calendar of Mexico, the celebration of the Virgen de la Candelaria in Tlacotalpan, Veracruz, is a must. From January 31 to February 2, thousands of people crowd the streets of this beautiful place. During this festival, most Tlacotalpeños open their houses to accommodate thousands of visitors. During the days of the fair, the XXXVI National Meeting of Jaraneros and Versadores will be held in Plaza Doña Martha from 5:00 p.m. to 11:00 p.m. 56 groups are considered in the program, each one will have a participation of 10 to 30 minutes. Every night, ending this Encounter, the fandango will begin in the same square. There will also be fandangos in front of the church of San Miguel Arcángel better known as San Miguelito.

== Geography and environment ==
Tlacotalpan is located in the center of the eastern Mexico state of Veracruz, about 90 km from the port of Veracruz and 203 km southeast of the capital, Xalapa. It is part of the Sotavento region of the state.

The geography of the area is somewhat flat, with rolling foothills towards the west. Most of the territory (60%) is used for livestock grazing, with about 15% under cultivation and 20% covered by water.

The territory is defined by the Papaloapan River, along with the San Juan and Tuxpan Rivers which are both tributaries of the first. The Papaloapan is navigable, but there is neither dredging or signaling for boat traffic.

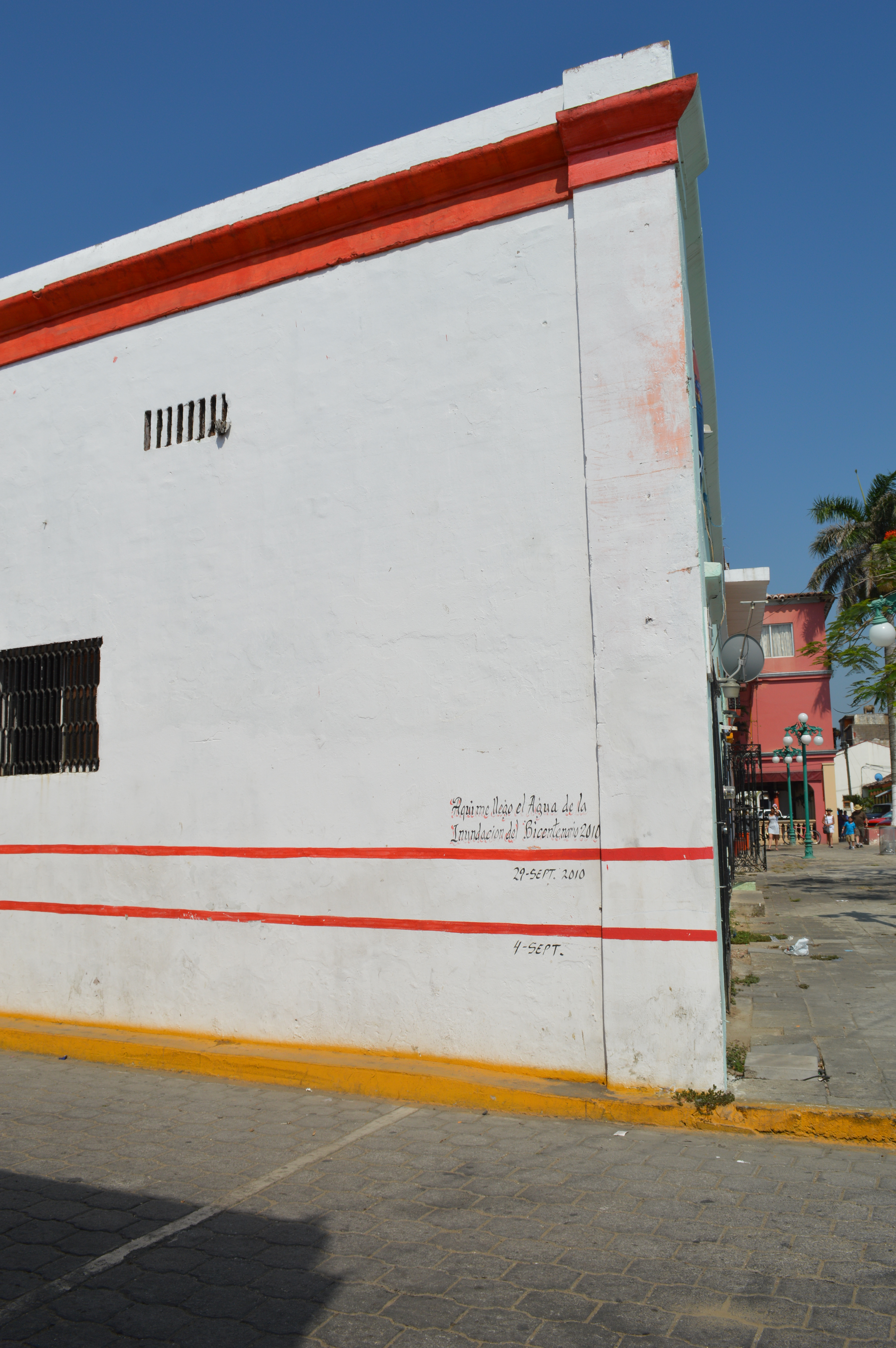
House in the town showing levels of flooding in 2010

The area has a semi-tropical climate, with an average annual temperatureof 25.1C. There are two distinct seasons. From October to April, the weather is dominated by the passing of cold fronts from the north, called "nortes." These fronts can cause strong winds and tornados. During the rest of the year, the weather is dominated by the Atlantic Current (Corriente Atlántica), which are warm and humid winds coming from the southeast of Mexico, causing most of the area's annual rainfall. September is the stormiest month and the area is also affected regularly by hurricanes. These can cause severe flooding such as the case of Hurricane Roxanne in 1995, Hurricanes Dean and Felix in 1997, Hurricane Karl in 2010 and Hurricane Ernesto in 2012.

The vegetation is deciduous, with main tree species being holm oak, ash (Fraxinus), willow and poplar. There are also areas with mangroves.

The area has some oil deposits.

== History ==
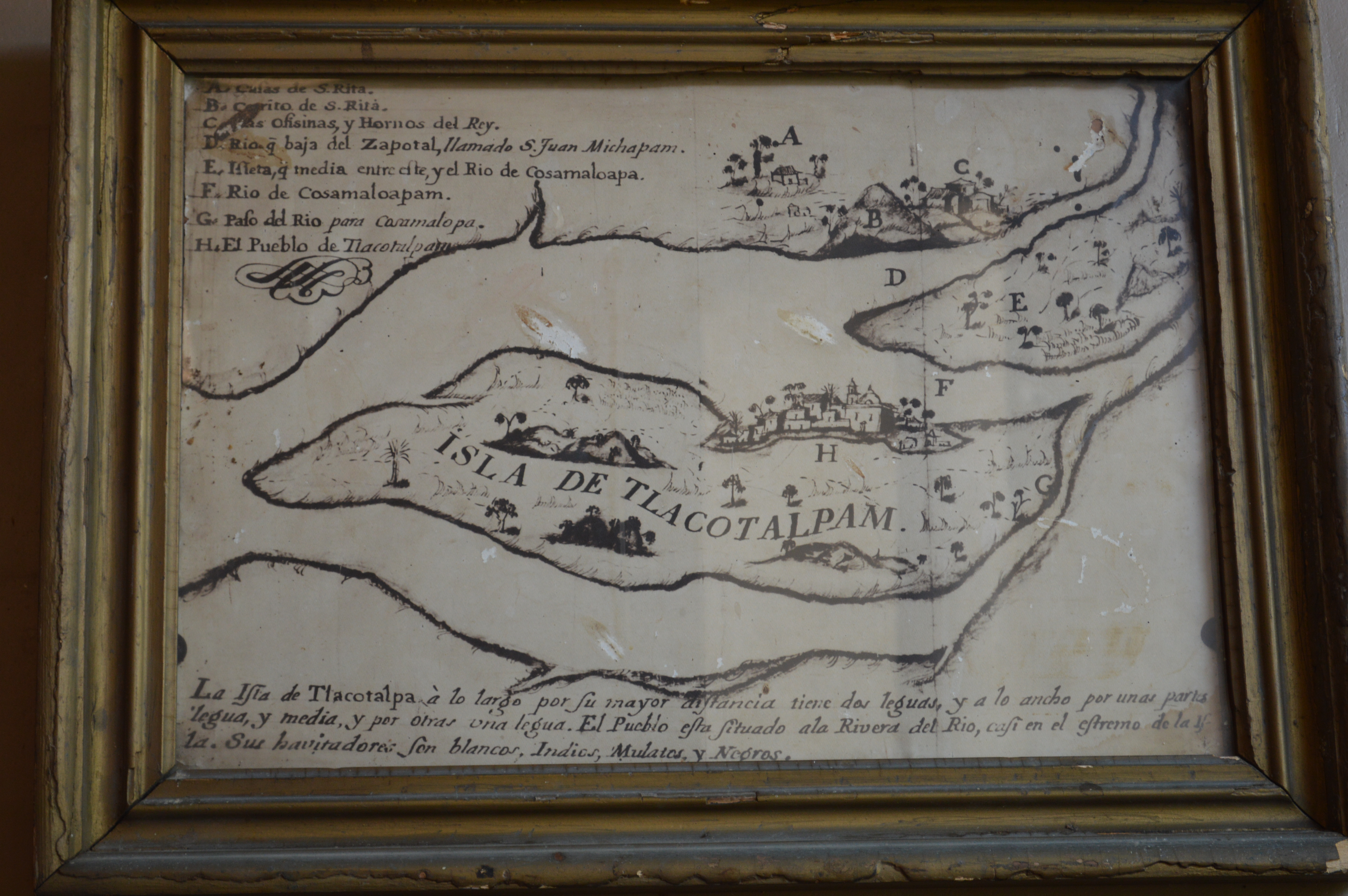
Early colonial era map showing Tlacotalpan as an island at the Salvador Ferrando Museum

The name "Tlacotalpan" is a Spanish modification of the Nahuatl "Tlaxcotaliapan" which means "land between the waters." This refers to the island of the original settlement in the Papaloapan River. When the north bank of the river was modified, the island was adjoined to the mainland. In the mid-19th century, the name was San Cristobal Tlacotalpan, but has since been shortened.

Much is not known about the pre Hispanic history of the area, but the area was originally inhabited by the Totonacs. These were later displaced by the Toltecs in the 12th century. In 1461, Moctezuma Ilhuicamina began the first Aztec efforts to expand here, then controlled by the Cotaxtlan dominion. In 1475, Axayacatl conquered it along with Coixtlahuaca, Tochtepec and Cosamaloapan, giving all these areas their current names.

In 1518, Pedro de Alvarado led an expedition sailing up the Papaloapan area and in 1521, Hernán Cortés sent Gonzalo de Sandoval here to search for gold. After the Conquest in 1521, Alfonso Romero received the area as an encomienda. In the current municipality, in a place then called Coanapa-Ayotzinapa, Cortés set up the first sugar cane mill in Mexico in 1532. In 1550, it was granted by the Spanish king to Gaspar Rivakeneyra on which he kept livestock. He could not prevent fishermen from establishing the town but he required them to build a chapel dedicated to Our Lady of Candlemas.

Colonization of the area was slow with only twelve Spaniards in 1544 and no more than 320 by 1777. Figures on other populations during the colonial period are missing but in 1808 there were 1,156 indigenous inhabitants and 1,616 "pardos" or people of indigenous and African heritage.

At the beginning of the 17th century, there was an attempt to subordinate the area to Cosamaloapan, but the indigenous population here resisted it successfully. In the 17th century, it became a commercial center for surrounding haciendas, which led to growth in its Spanish population. Its wealth and status as a port attracted English pirates in the 17th and 18th centuries and the city was burned down once by them in 1667.

In 1714, the Papaloapan flooded and forced the movement of the city to its current location, then called Chuniapa. The town suffered three other major fires in 1698, 1788 and 1790. The last two prompted authorities to require rebuilding with stone walls, tile roofs and the establishment of open spaces with trees. Those who could not rebuild in this fashion were forced to move to the eastern part of the town which had more relaxed requirements. Most of the oldest buildings date from this time and determined the common style of large houses with courtyards, tile roofs and arched passages.

The municipality's territory was fixed by the end of the 18th century.

Tlacotalpan reached its height as a port city in the 19th century. At the beginning of this century, French, German and Italian immigrants came to the area to plant and weave cotton, to be sold in English markets. Starting in 1821, Tlacotalpan experienced economic grown as a port for products from Oaxaca and Puebla going to Veracruz and abroad to New Orleans, Havana and Bordeaux. By 1855 it was home to eighteen steamships and a large sailing ship which transported timber, tobacco, cotton, grain, sugar, brandy, leather, salted meat, crocodiles, heron feathers, furniture and soap. In 1825 one of Mexico's first nautical colleges was opened, founded by Guadalupe Victoria. In 1847, Tlacotalpan was officially declared a town in recognition of its participation in the defense against U.S. forces in the Mexican–American War. In 1864 the town was taken by French forces under Marechal one day after taking Alvarado. Later that same year, Republican forces under Alejandro García retook the area. In 1865 it was declared a city and provisional capital for its resistance against the French. In 1879, Miguel Z. Cházaro founded Veracruz's third preparatory school. Here Porfirio Díaz organized an uprising against the government of Sebastián Lerdo de Tejada, which led to a name change of Tlacotalpan de Porfirio Díaz in 1896. This was changed to the current version after the Mexican Revolution. At the beginning of the 20th century, the town had eight schools, three hotels, nine factories and 100 single-storied houses.

However, in the first part of the 20th century, Tlacotalpan's importance as a port, which had sustained it since the colonial period, waned with the construction of the Ferrocarril del Istmo railroad. Its population grew only slightly from 1950 to 1980 and has remained stable since then at a bit over 8,800.

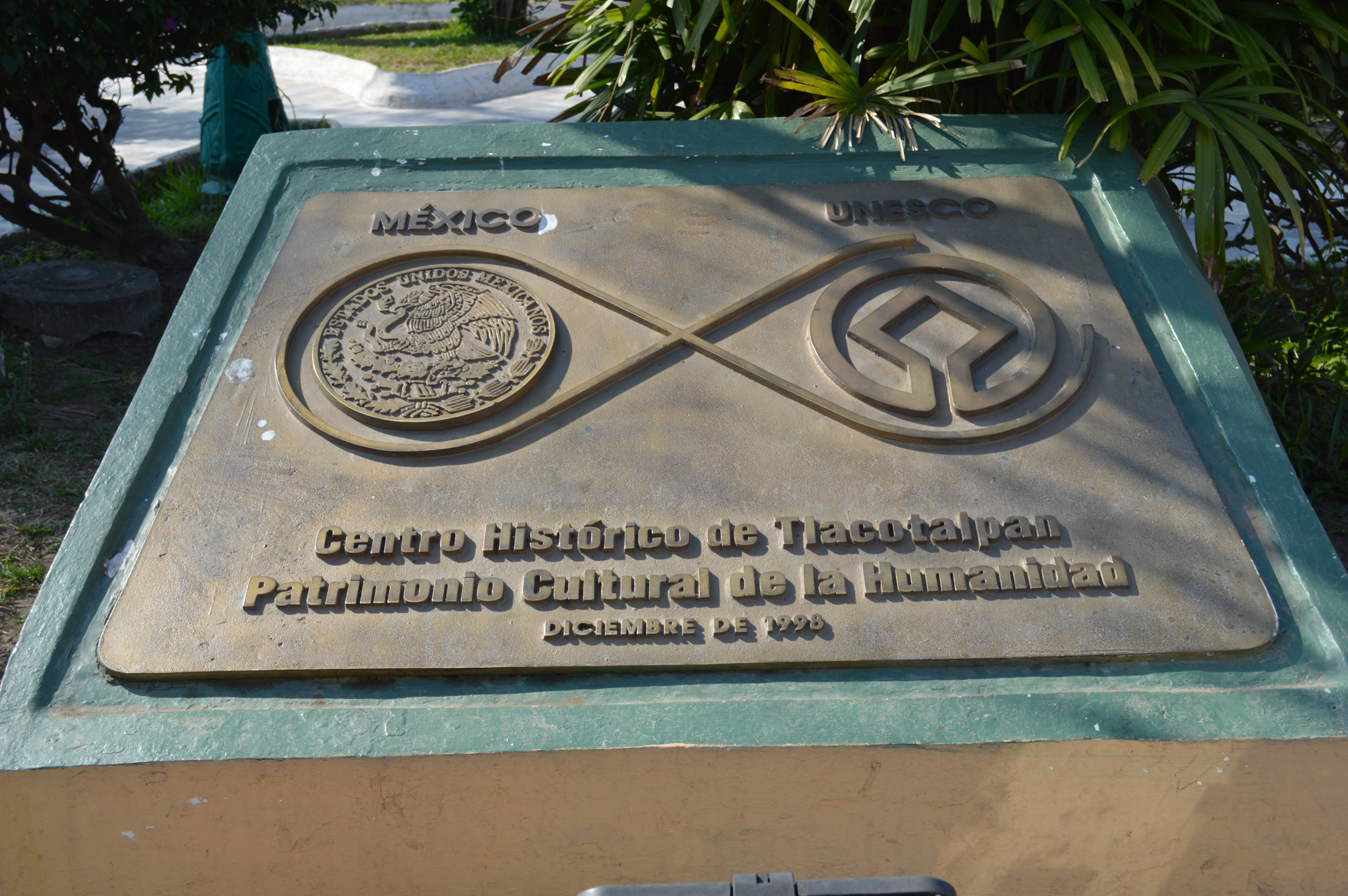
World Heritage Site plaque in the main square

In 1968, conservation efforts began when Tlacotalpan was declared a "typical city" of Mexico by the state of Veracruz. In 1986 it was declared a Historic Monuments Zone by the federal government to be managed by the Instituto Nacional de Antropologia e Historia (INAH) and the Instituto Nacional de Bellas Artes (INBA). In 1985 and 1997 a transition zone was established which includes areas across the river which serves as a buffer to the main conservation area. In 1998, it was named a World Heritage Site by UNESCO for its history as a river port, its architecture and its traditions in poetry, music and dance.

Since these declarations INAH and the Fondo Nacional para la Cultura y las Arts (FONCA) have worked to revitalize the city and improve the economy, particularly through tourism.

== Notable people ==
- Francisco Lagos Cházaro (1878-1932), acting president of Mexico from June 10,1915 to October 10,1915
