= Raging Bull (disambiguation) =

Raging Bull is a 1980 film about boxer Jake LaMotta.

Raging Bull or The Raging Bull may also refer to:

== Nickname or ring name ==
- Jake LaMotta (1922–2017), American former world champion boxer
- Darren Corbett (born 1972), boxer from Northern Ireland
- Gorden Tallis (born 1973), Australian rugby league player
- Phil Vickery (rugby union) (born 1976), English former rugby union player
- Enrico Villanueva (born 1980), Filipino basketball player
- ring name of Manny Fernandez (wrestler) (born 1954), professional wrestler
- Harshad Mehta (1954–2001), Indian stockbroker and fraudster, nicknamed "The Big Bull" and "Raging Bull"

== Other uses ==
- HMM-261, a United States Marine Corps helicopter squadron known as the Raging Bulls
- Raging Bull: My Story, LaMotta's 1970 memoir and the basis for the 1980 film
- Raging Bull (roller coaster), a roller-coaster at Six Flags Great America in Gurnee, Illinois
- Taurus Raging Bull, a revolver
- "Raging Bull" (Phil of the Future episode)
- RagingBull.com, a financial website
- "Raging Bull", a 2014 song by ATB
- Raging Bull, former unofficial name of the animatronic sculpture Ozzy the Bull

== See also ==
- Easy Riders, Raging Bulls, a 1998 book
- Murattu Kaalai (disambiguation) (lit. 'Rogue Bull'), various Indian films
