= El Toro, Jujuy =

Coordinates: 23°05′02″S 66°42′08″W

El Toro (Jujuy)
- Rural municipality and village
- Interactive map of El Toro (Jujuy)
- Country: Argentina
- Province: Jujuy Province
- Time zone: UTC−3 (ART)

El Toro (Jujuy) is a rural municipality and village in Jujuy Province in Argentina.
