= El Toro (nickname) =

El Toro (Spanish for "the Bull") is the nickname of:

- Roberto Acuña (born 1972), Paraguayan footballer
- Pedro Álvarez (baseball) (born 1987), third baseman with the Pittsburgh Pirates Major League Baseball team
- Daniel Aquino (born 1965), retired Argentine footballer
- Marcos Ayerza (born 1983), Argentine retired rugby union
- Mauro Cantoro (born 1976), Argentine footballer
- Alexander Lévy (born 1990), French golfer
- Lautaro Martínez (born 1997), Argentine footballer
- Ernesto Pérez Balladares (born 1946), former President of Panama (1994-99)
- Jaime Castillo Petruzzi, Chilean terrorist and financier
- Lupillo Rivera (born 1972), Mexican-American singer
- Fernando Valenzuela (born 1960), Mexican Major League Baseball pitcher
- Carlos Zambrano (born 1981), Venezuelan Major League Baseball pitcher.

== See also ==
- Bull (nickname)
