= Torito =

Torito (also known as Toro) is a cocktail from the east coast of Mexico.

Torito originated in the state of Veracruz in the early 1900s. It was first made with firewater and fruits, then rum replaced the firewater, milk was added, and, most recently, it was blended with tequila. This cocktail became the typical drink of the gulf coast of Mexico, where new flavors were created by mixing fruit and grains from this tropical region. The most popular flavors are peanut, mango, peach, coconut, passion fruit, cajeta, soursop, and coffee.
