= Visayas =

Archipelago in the Philippines

Coordinates: 11°00′N 123°30′E

Native name: Kabisay-an (Visayan)
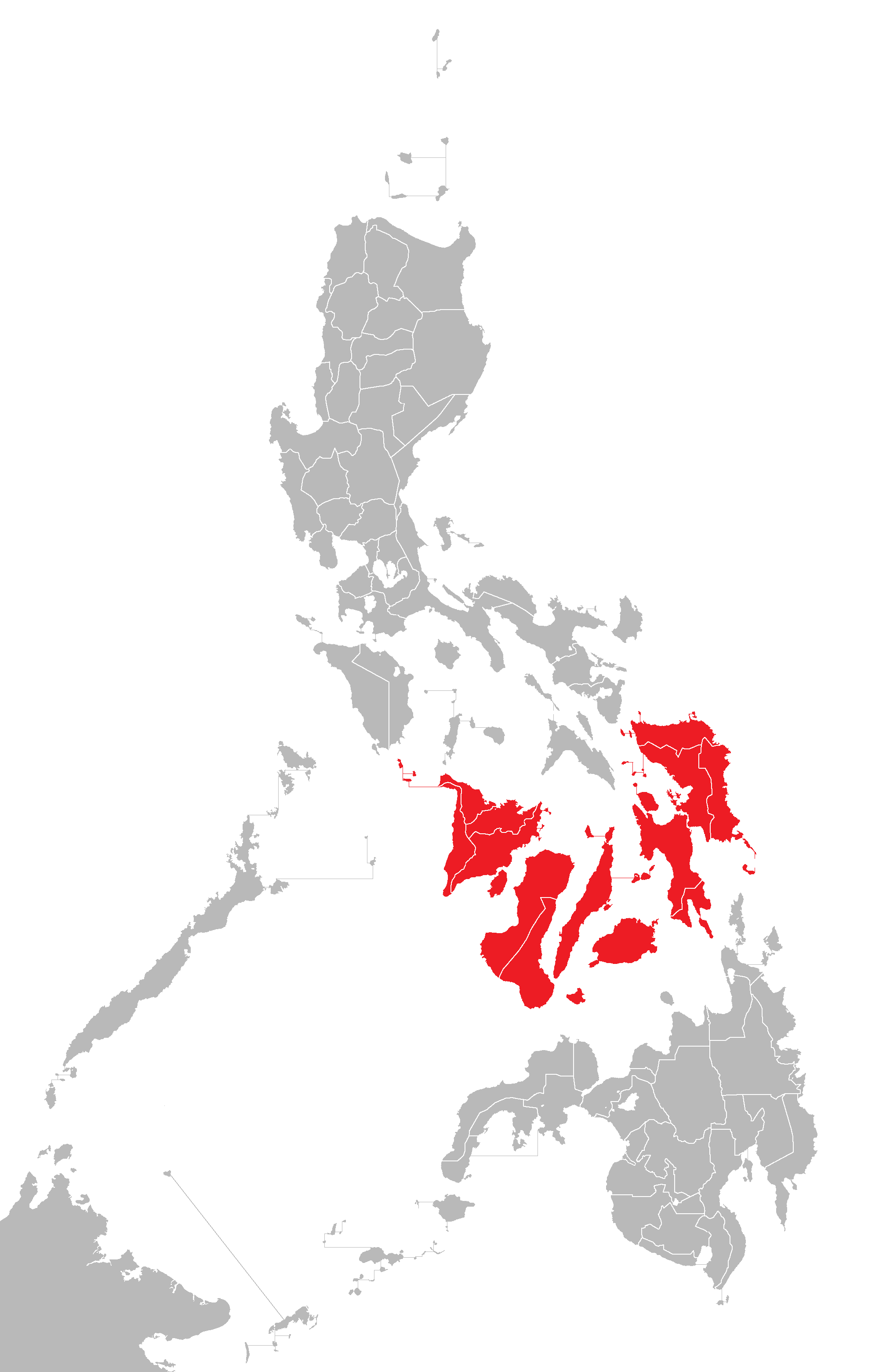
- Location of the Visayas within the Philippines
- Interactive map of Visayas

Geography
- Location: Southeast Asia
- Archipelago: Philippines
- Major islands: Bohol; Cebu; Leyte; Negros; Panay; Samar
- Area: 71,503 km^{2} (27,607 sq mi)
- Highest elevation: 2,465 m (8087 ft)
- Highest point: Mount Kanlaon

Administration
- Philippines
- Regions: Region 6 – Western Visayas; NIR – Negros Island Region; Region 7 – Central Visayas; Region 8 – Eastern Visayas
- Largest settlement: Cebu City (pop. 964,169)

Demographics
- Demonym: Visayan (natively "Bisayâ")
- Population: 21,033,659 (2024)
- Pop. density: 294/km^{2} (761/sq mi)
- Ethnic groups: Visayans; Aklanon; Boholano; Butuanon; Capiznon; Cebuano; Cuyunon; Eskaya; Hiligaynon; Karay-a; Masbateño; Porohanon; Romblomanon; Suludnon; Surigaonon; Waray; Negrito (Ati); other ethnic groups

The Visayas (/vəˈsaɪəz/ və-SY-əz), or the Visayan Islands (Visayan: Kabisay-an, Cebuano pronunciation: [kabiˈsajʔan]; Filipino: Kabisayaan [kɐbɪsɐˈjaʔan]), are one of the three principal geographical divisions of the Philippines, along with Luzon and Mindanao. Located in the central part of the archipelago, it consists of several islands, primarily surrounding the Visayan Sea, although the Visayas are also considered the northeast extremity of the entire Sulu Sea. Its inhabitants are predominantly the Visayan peoples.

The major islands of the Visayas are Panay, Negros, Cebu, Bohol, Leyte and Samar. (Note: On May 23, 2005, Palawan and Puerto Princesa City were moved to Western Visayas by Executive Order No. 429. However, on August 19, 2005, President Arroyo issued Administrative Order No. 129 to hold the earlier E.O. 429 in abeyance pending a review. As of 2010, Palawan and the highly urbanized city of Puerto Princesa still remain a part of the Mimaropa region.) The region may also include the provinces of Palawan, Romblon, and Masbate, whose populations identify as Visayan and whose languages are more closely related to other Visayan languages than to the major languages of Luzon.

There are four administrative regions in the Visayas: Western Visayas (pop. 4.86 million), Negros Island Region (pop. 4.90 million), Central Visayas (6.64 million) and Eastern Visayas (4.63 million).

== Etymology ==
=== Pre-colonial etymology ===
From the 1950s to 1960s there were spurious claims by various authors that "Bisaya" is derived from the historical empire of "Sri Vijaya" which came from the Sanskrit term "Śrīvijaya" (श्रीविजय), arguing that the Visayans were either settlers from Sri Vijaya or were subjects of it. This claim is largely based only on the resemblance of the word Bisaya to Vijaya. But as the linguist Eugene Verstraelen pointed out, Vijaya would evolve into Bidaya or Biraya, not Bisaya, based on how other Sanskrit-derived loanwords become integrated into Philippine languages.

The name has also been hypothesized to be related to the Bisaya ethnic group of Borneo, the latter incidentally recounted in the controversial Maragtas epic as the alleged origins of the ancestral settlers in Panay. However historical, archeological, and linguistic evidence for this are still paltry. The languages of the Bisaya of Borneo and of the Bisaya of the Philippines do not show any special correlation, apart from the fact that they all belong to the same Austronesian family. This is contested by Historian Robert Nicholl who implied that the Srivijayans of Sumatra, Vijayans of Vijayapura at Brunei and the Visayans in the Philippines were all related and connected to each other since they form one contiguous area. On a similar note, according to an early Spanish missionary and historian P. Francisco Colin, S.J. in the Philippines, the inhabitants of Panay Island were originally from north Sumatra. Similarly there are claims that it was the name of a folk hero (allegedly "Sri Visaya") or that it originated from the exclamation "Bisai-yah!" ("How beautiful!") by the Sultan of Brunei who was visiting Visayas for the first time. All these claims have been challenged and remain as mere speculations and folk etymologies.

=== Colonial etymology ===
The exact meaning and origin of the name of the Visayas is unknown. The first documented use of the name is possibly by Song-era Chinese maritime official Zhao Rugua as the Pi-sho-ye, who raided the coasts of Fujian and Penghu during the late 12th century using iron javelins attached to ropes as their weapons.

Visayans were first referred to by the general term Pintados ("the painted ones") by the Spanish, in reference to the prominent practice of full-body tattooing (batok). The word "Bisaya", on the other hand, was first documented in Spanish sources in reference to the non-Ati inhabitants of the island of Panay. However, it is likely that the name was already used as a general endonym by Visayans long before Spanish colonization, as evidenced by at least once instance of a place named "Bisaya" in coastal eastern Mindanao as reported by the Loaisa (c.1526), Saavedra (c.1528), and the Villalobos (c.1543) expeditions. It is likely that the reason the Spanish did not use the term generally until the later decades of the 1500s is due to the fact that people were more likely to identify themselves with more specific ethnic names like Sugbuanon.

In Sucesos de las Islas Filipinas (1609) by Antonio de Morga, he specifies that the name "Biçaya" is synonymous with Pintados.

"South of this district lie the islands of Biçayas, or, as they are also called, Pintados. They are many in number, thickly populated with natives. Those of most renown are Leite, Ybabao, Çamar, Bohol, island of Negros, Sebu, Panay, Cuyo, and the Calamianes. All the natives of these islands, both men and women, are well-featured, of a good disposition, and of better nature, and more noble in their actions than the inhabitants of the islands of Luzon and its vicinity.

They differ from them in their hair, which the men wear cut in a cue, like the ancient style in España. Their bodies are tattooed with many designs, but the face is not touched. They wear large earrings of gold and ivory in their ears, and bracelets of the same; certain scarfs wrapped round the head, very showy, which resemble turbans, and knotted very gracefully and edged with gold. They wear also a loose collarless jacket with tight sleeves, whose skirts reach half way down the leg. These garments are fastened in front and are made of medriñaque and colored silks. They wear no shirts or drawers, but bahaques of many wrappings, which cover their privy parts, when they remove their skirts and jackets. The women are good-looking and graceful. They are very neat, and walk slowly. Their hair is black, long, and drawn into a knot on the head. Their robes are wrapped about the waist and fall downward. These are made of all colors, and they wear collarless jackets of the same material. Both men and women go naked and without any coverings, and barefoot, and with many gold chains, earrings, and wrought bracelets.

Their weapons consist of large knives curved like cutlasses, spears, and caraças. They employ the same kinds of boats as the inhabitants of Luzon. They have the same occupations, products, and means of gain as the inhabitants of all the other islands. These Visayans are a race less inclined to agriculture, and are skilful in navigation, and eager for war and raids for pillage and booty, which they call mangubas. This means "to go out for plunder."

. . . The language of all the Pintados and Biçayas is one and the same, by which they understand one another when talking, or when writing with the letters and characters of their own which they possess. These resemble those of the Arabs. The common manner of writing among the natives is on leaves of trees, and on bamboo bark.

— Antonio de Morga, Sucesos de las Islas Filipinas (1609) translated in Morga's Philippine Islands (1907) by Emma Helen Blair and James Alexander Robertson,

== History ==
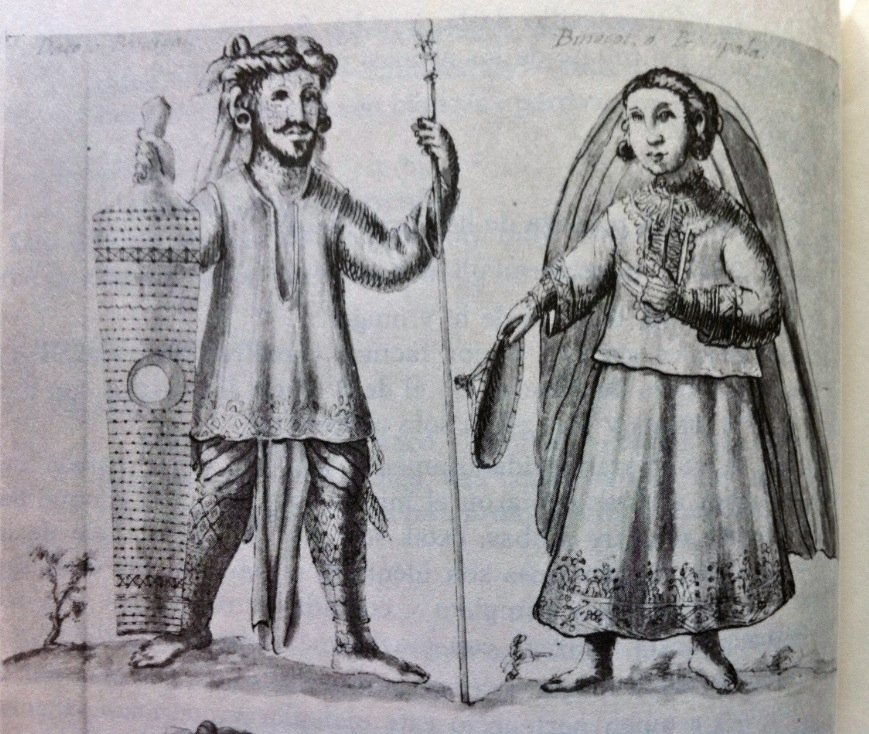
1668 depiction of a datu and a binukot, who were regarded as part of the aristocracy (Principalia) during the early period of Spanish.

Among the Chinese, especially during the Ming era, the Visayans are called Peshiye.

The areas known as Pisheye were probably located in lowland coastal regions with minimal agricultural activity, a description that primarily fit the Rajahnate of Cebu and secondarily, the neighboring kingdoms: Dapitan, Madja-as, and Butuan; fit well.

The Visayans, known for their seafaring prowess, frequently conducted raids on the southern coasts of China. Their targets included major cities such as Quanzhou, along with smaller towns like Shui'ao and Weito. These attacks were launched from their operational base located in Eastern Taiwan.

Wang's account of the locals' appearance aligns with descriptions of the Pintados people. He noted that both men and women gathered their hair into topknots (男女撮髻, nan nü cuo ji) and used ink to tattoo their bodies up to the neck (以墨汁刺身至頭頸, yi mo zhi ci shen zhi tou jing).

After the defeat of the Magellan expedition at the Battle of Mactan by Lapu-Lapu, King Philip II of Spain sent Miguel López de Legazpi in 1543 and 1565 to colonize the islands for Spain. Subsequently, the Visayas region and many kingdoms began converting to Christianity and adopting western culture. The Spanish and Mexican conquistadors that accompanied Miguel Lopez de Legazpi were soon awarded encomiendas to govern chief among which was Diego de Artieda, for the whole of the Visayas, he held administrative and encomienda authority; figures unclear. Of the islands of the Visayas the primary ones initially given over to the Spanish-Mexican encomenderos were the islands of Panay and Cebu. Of Panay: Gabriel de Ribera, had Panay (riverine settlements), of approximately 4,000 tributaries. Luis de la Haya, Panay (Araut River region), large inland encomienda; figures not precisely recorded. Pedro Sarmiento, Panay Early encomendero; tribute data not specified. and Francisco de Rivera, Panay, held an encomienda in the region; details incomplete. Of the encomiendas in Cebu: the first was given to Adelantado Miguel Lopez de Legaspi, leader of the expedition from Mexico, he was given a large encomienda of an unknown number of Filipino tributaries. Next, is Jerónimo de Monzón, whose number of tributes was also not specifically cited. Cristóbal Sánchez, was mentioned next, with 3000 native Cebuano tributes, Followed by, Francisco Carreño with about 2000 Cebuano tributes, Afterwards, Andrés de Mirandaola with 1,000 tributes which are also in Cebu, and finally Pedro Arana, whose precise number of tributes are not specifically quantified. All of these Mexican conquistadors were given lands and encomiendas in and around the region of Cebu.

By the 18th and 19th centuries, the effects of colonization on various ethnic groups turned sour and revolutions such as those of Francisco Dagohoy began to emerge.

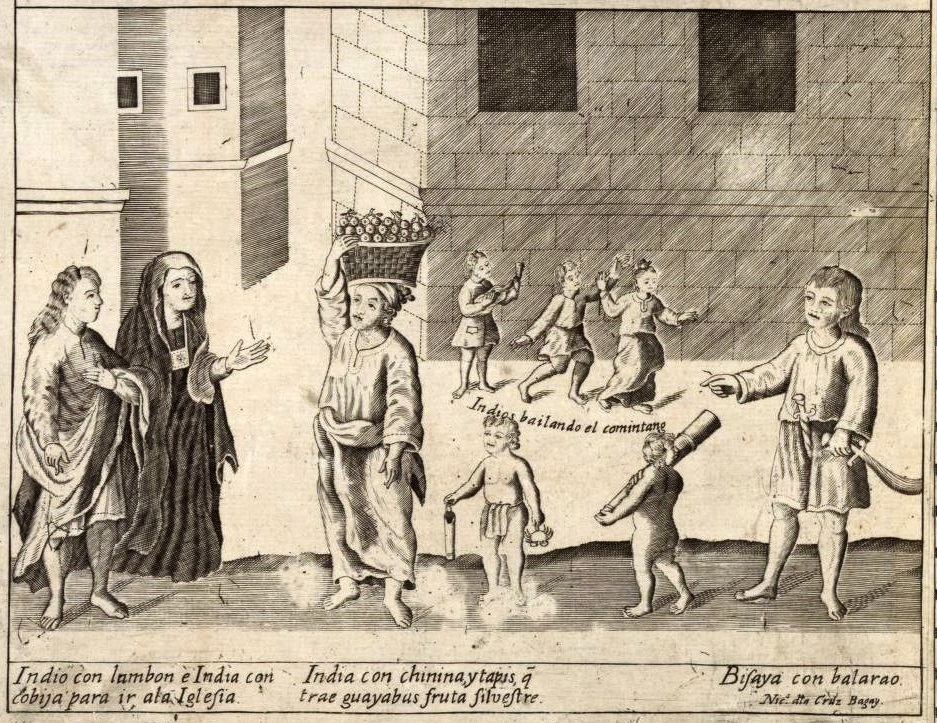
Visayans depicted in Velarde map 1734.

Various personalities who fought against the Spanish colonial government arose within the archipelago. Among the notable ones are Teresa Magbanua, Graciano Lopez Jaena and Martin Delgado from Iloilo, Aniceto Lacson, León Kilat and Diego de la Viña from Negros, Venancio Jakosalem Fernandez from Cebu, and two personalities from Bohol by the name of Tamblot, who led the Tamblot Uprising in 1621 to 1622 and Francisco Dagohoy, the leader of the Bohol Rebellion that lasted from 1744 to 1829. Negros briefly stood as an independent nation in the Visayas in the form of the Cantonal Republic of Negros, before it was absorbed back to the Philippines because of the American takeover of the archipelago.

The short-lived Federal State of the Visayas was established as a revolutionary state during the Philippine Revolution. It designated Iloilo City as the Visayas capital and was composed of three governments: the Provisional Government of the District of Visayas (Panay), the Cantonal Government of Negros, the Cantonal Government of Bohol, and the island of Cebu, which was under revolutionary control.

On May 23, 2005, Palawan (including its highly urbanized capital city of Puerto Princesa) was transferred from Mimaropa (Region IV-B) to Western Visayas (Region VI) under Executive Order No. 429, signed by Gloria Macapagal Arroyo, who was the president at that year. However, Palaweños criticized the move, citing a lack of consultation, with most residents in Puerto Princesa and all Palawan municipalities but one, preferring to stay in Mimaropa (Region IV-B). Consequently, Administrative Order No. 129 was issued on August 19, 2005, that the implementation of E.O. 429 be held in abeyance, pending approval by the president of its Implementation Plan. The Philippine Commission on Elections reported the 2010 Philippine general election results for Palawan as a part of the Region IV-B results. As of 30 June 2011, the abeyance was still in effect, with Palawan and its capital city remaining under Mimaropa (Region IV-B).

On May 29, 2015, the twin provinces of Negros Occidental (including its highly urbanized capital city, Bacolod) and Negros Oriental were joined to form the Negros Island Region under Executive Order No. 183, signed by President Benigno Aquino III. It separated both, the former province and its capital city from Western Visayas and the latter province from Central Visayas.

On August 9, 2017, President Rodrigo Duterte signed Executive Order No. 38, revoking the Executive Order No. 183 signed by his predecessor, President Benigno Aquino III, on May 29, 2015, due to the reason of the lack of funds to fully establish the NIR according to Benjamin Diokno, the Secretary of Budget and Management.

On June 13, 2024, the Negros Island Region was re-established, with the inclusion of Siquijor.

=== Mythical allusions and hypotheses ===
Historical documents written in 1907 by Visayan historian Pedro Alcántara Monteclaro in his book Maragtas tell the story of the ten leaders (Datus) who escaped from the tyranny of Rajah Makatunaw from Borneo and came to the islands of Panay. The chiefs and followers were said to be the ancestors (from the collapsing empires of Srivijaya and Majapahit) of the Visayan people. The documents were accepted by Filipino historians and found their way into the history of the Philippines. As a result, the arrival of Bornean tribal groups in the Visayas (From Vijayapura a Srivijayan vassal state in Borneo) is celebrated in the festivals of the Dinagyang in Iloilo City, Ati-Atihan in Kalibo, Aklan, and Binirayan in San Jose de Buenavista, Antique. Foreign historians such as William Henry Scott maintains that the book contains a Visayan folk tradition.

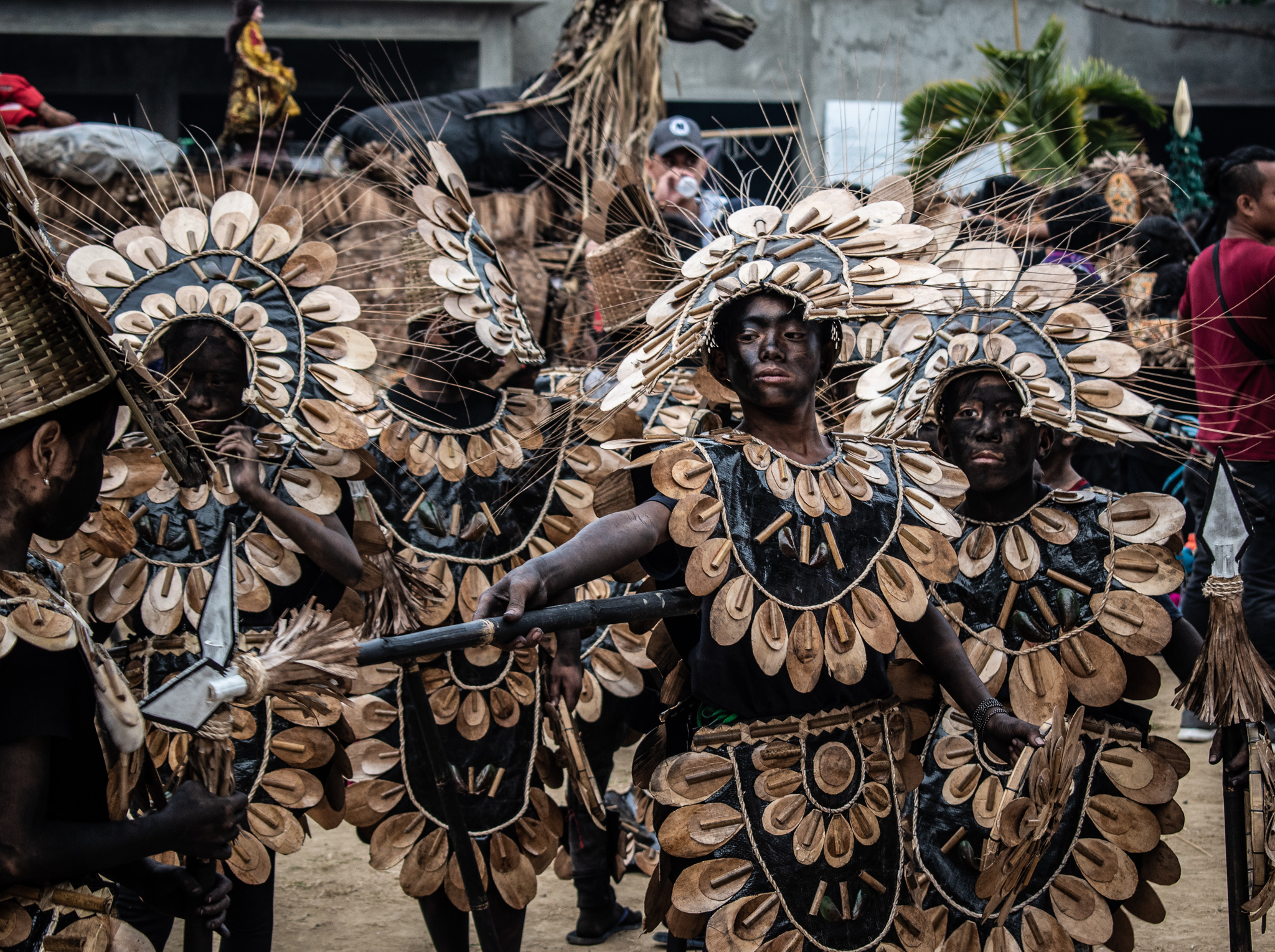
Ati-Atihan Festival, a celebration of the purported arrival of "Borneans" in Panay

A contemporary theory based on a study of genetic markers in present-day populations is that Austronesian peoples from Taiwan populated the larger island of Luzon and headed south to the Visayas and Mindanao, and then to Indonesia and Malaysia, then to Pacific Islands and finally to the island of Madagascar, at the west of the Indian Ocean. The study, though, may not explain inter-island migrations, which are also possible, such as Filipinos migrating to any other Philippine provinces. There has even been backmigration to the island of Taiwan, as the historian Efren B. Isorena, through analysis of historical accounts and wind currents in the Pacific side of East and Southeast Asia, concluded that the Pisheye of Taiwan and the Bisaya of the Visayas islands in the Philippines, were closely related people as Visayans were recorded to have travelled to Taiwan from the Philippines via the northward windcurrents before they raided China and returned south after the southwards monsoon during summer.

== Geography ==
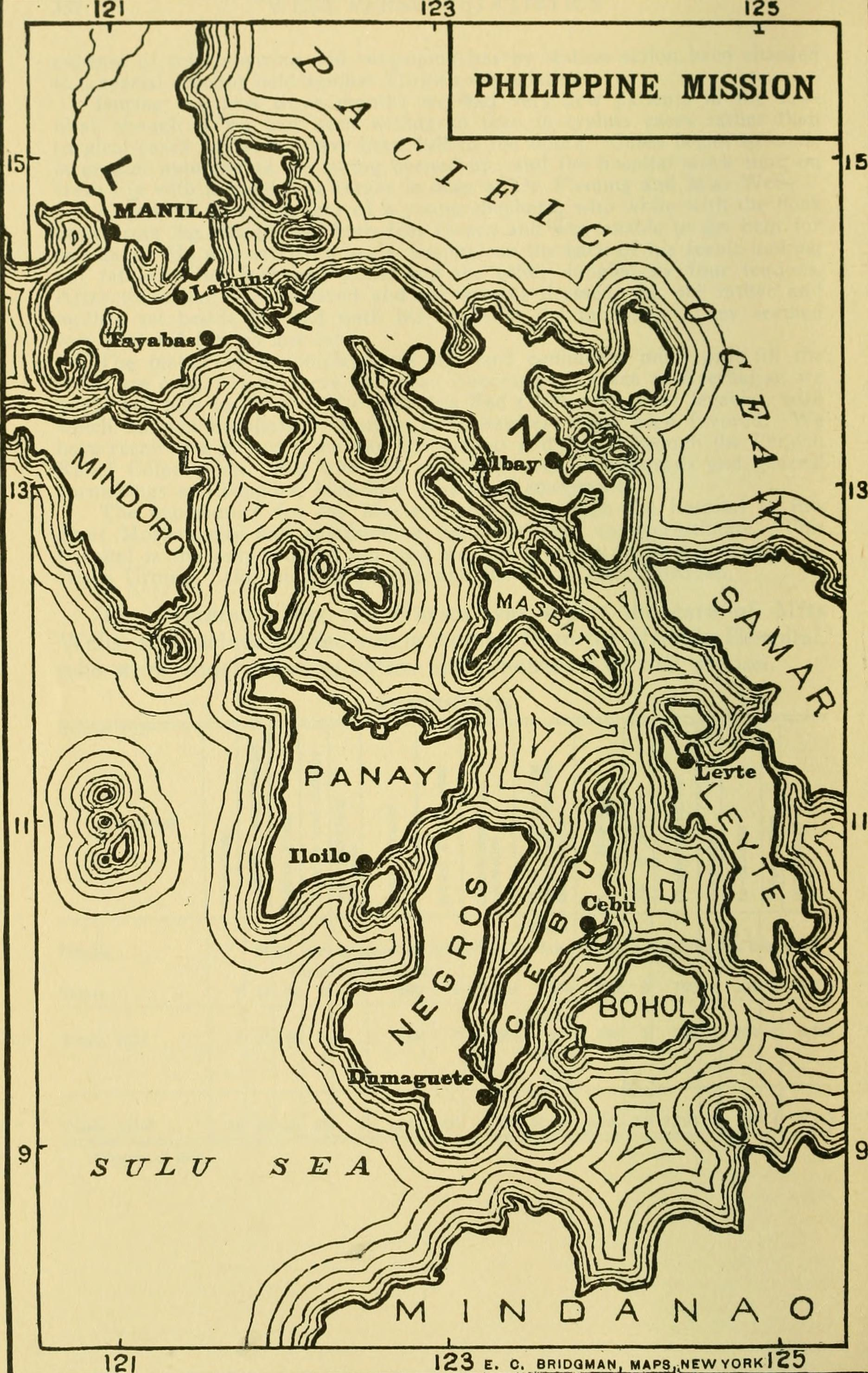
1920 map of the Visayas

Visayas region is located in central Philippines, with a total land area of 71,503 km^{2} (27,607 sq mi). It consists of seven large and several hundred smaller islands, including Samar, Negros, Panay, Leyte, Cebu, Bohol, Guimaras, Biliran, Siquijor, Panaon and Bantayan. Some of the largest cities in the region include Cebu City (population 1,024,945 in 2023), Bacolod City (population 648,773 in 2023), and Iloilo City (population 491,641 in 2023).

=== List of islands by population ===
The following numbers are derived from the 2015 Philippine census.

- Panay – 4,123,213
- Negros – 4,414,875
- Cebu – 4,164,535
- Leyte – 2,388,518
- Samar – 1,751,267
- Bohol – 1,211,000
- Mactan – 467,824
- Guimaras – 174,613
- Biliran – 171,612
- Bantayan – 136,960
- Siquijor – 95,984
- Panglao – 79,216
- Panaon – 57,703
- Pacijan – 55,180
- Daram – 39,032
- Poro – 36,508
- Boracay – 32,267
- Ponson – 11,308
- Maripipi – 7,159
- Limasawa – 6,061
- Homonhon – 4,211
- Parasan – 3,847
- Batbatan – 2,851
- Mararison – 750
- Maniguin – 719

== Administrative divisions ==
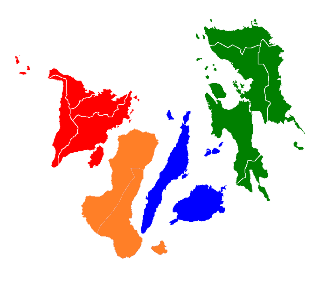
A map of the Visayas, color-coded according to the constituent regions (since June 2024) Central Visayas Eastern Visayas Western Visayas Negros Island Region The major islands, from west to east, are Panay, Negros, Cebu, Bohol, Leyte, and Samar.

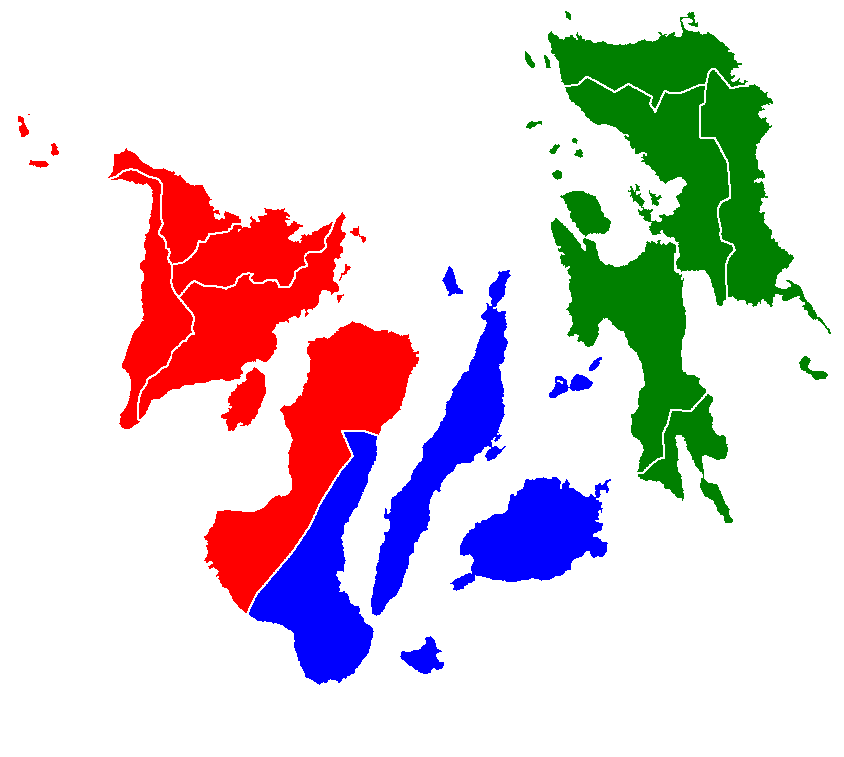
A former map of the Visayas, prior to the revival of Negros Island Region in June 2024 Central Visayas Eastern Visayas Western Visayas

Administratively, the Visayas is divided into 4 regions, namely Western Visayas, Negros Island Region, Central Visayas, and Eastern Visayas.

The Visayas is composed of 16 provinces, each headed by a Governor. A governor is elected by popular vote and can serve a maximum of three terms consisting of three years each.

=== Western Visayas (Region VI) ===
Western Visayas consists of the islands of Panay and Guimaras. The regional center is Iloilo City. Its provinces are:

- Aklan
- Antique
- Capiz
- Guimaras
- Iloilo

=== Negros Island Region (NIR) ===
Negros Island Region consists of the islands of Negros and Siquijor. The interim regional centers are Bacolod and Dumaguete. Please Note the Region Group is a simply interim group. The Provinces are in separate groups such as Western Visayas and Central Visayas. Its provinces are:

- Negros Occidental
- Negros Oriental
- Siquijor

=== Central Visayas (Region VII) ===
Central Visayas includes the islands of Cebu and Bohol. The regional center is Cebu City also known as the Queen City of the South. Its provinces are:

- Bohol
- Cebu

=== Eastern Visayas (Region VIII) ===
Eastern Visayas consists of the islands of Leyte, Samar and Biliran. The regional center is Tacloban City. Its provinces are:

- Biliran
- Leyte
- Southern Leyte
- Eastern Samar
- Northern Samar
- Samar

Scholars have argued that the region of Mimaropa and the province of Masbate are all part of the Visayas in line with the non-centric view. This is contested by a few politicians in line with the Manila-centric view.

== Demographics ==
Population of Visayas

Year	Pop.	±% p.a.
1903	2,863,077	—
1918	3,810,750	+1.92%
1939	5,590,104	+1.84%
1948	6,414,595	+1.54%
1960	7,642,073	+1.47%
1970	9,032,454	+1.68%

Year	Pop.	±% p.a.
1975	10,133,392	+2.33%
1980	11,112,523	+1.86%
1990	13,041,947	+1.61%
1995	14,158,443	+1.55%
2000	15,528,346	+2.00%
2007	17,159,481	+1.39%

Year	Pop.	±% p.a.
2010	18,003,940	+1.76%
2015	19,373,431	+1.41%
2020	20,583,861	+1.28%
2024	21,033,659	+0.52%

Source: Philippine Statistics Authority

=== Languages ===
Languages spoken at home are primarily Visayan languages, despite the misconception that these are dialects of a single macrolanguage. Cebuano is the largest native language spoken on Visayas Island, where approximately 20 million natives speak it. Major languages include Hiligaynon or Ilonggo in Western Visayas, Cebuano in Central Visayas, and Waray in Eastern Visayas. Other dominant languages are Aklanon, Kinaray-a, and Capiznon. Filipino, the 'national language' based on Tagalog, is widely understood but only occasionally used. English, another official language, is more widely known and is preferred as the second language, especially among urbanized Visayans.

== Culture and festivals ==
Visayans are often perceived as honoring their traditions and culture by celebrating festivals as they are known to be Roman Catholic or Christian in religion. These festivals are celebrated in tribute to their saints, to share peace and happiness, to give thanks for the abundant harvest, and to advertise their products. Visayans are known for their different festivals celebrated in other cities of Visayan Island.

Sinulog Festival is celebrated every third Sunday in January in Cebu City. This festival is a tribute to their saint, Senior Santo Nino de Cebu. The Sinulog festival includes parades, fluvial processions, dances, Cebu beauty pageants, and sometimes arts contests. Some other parts of Cebu provinces participate in the celebration by performing traditional dances and decorating a float, or Higantes, to represent their patron.

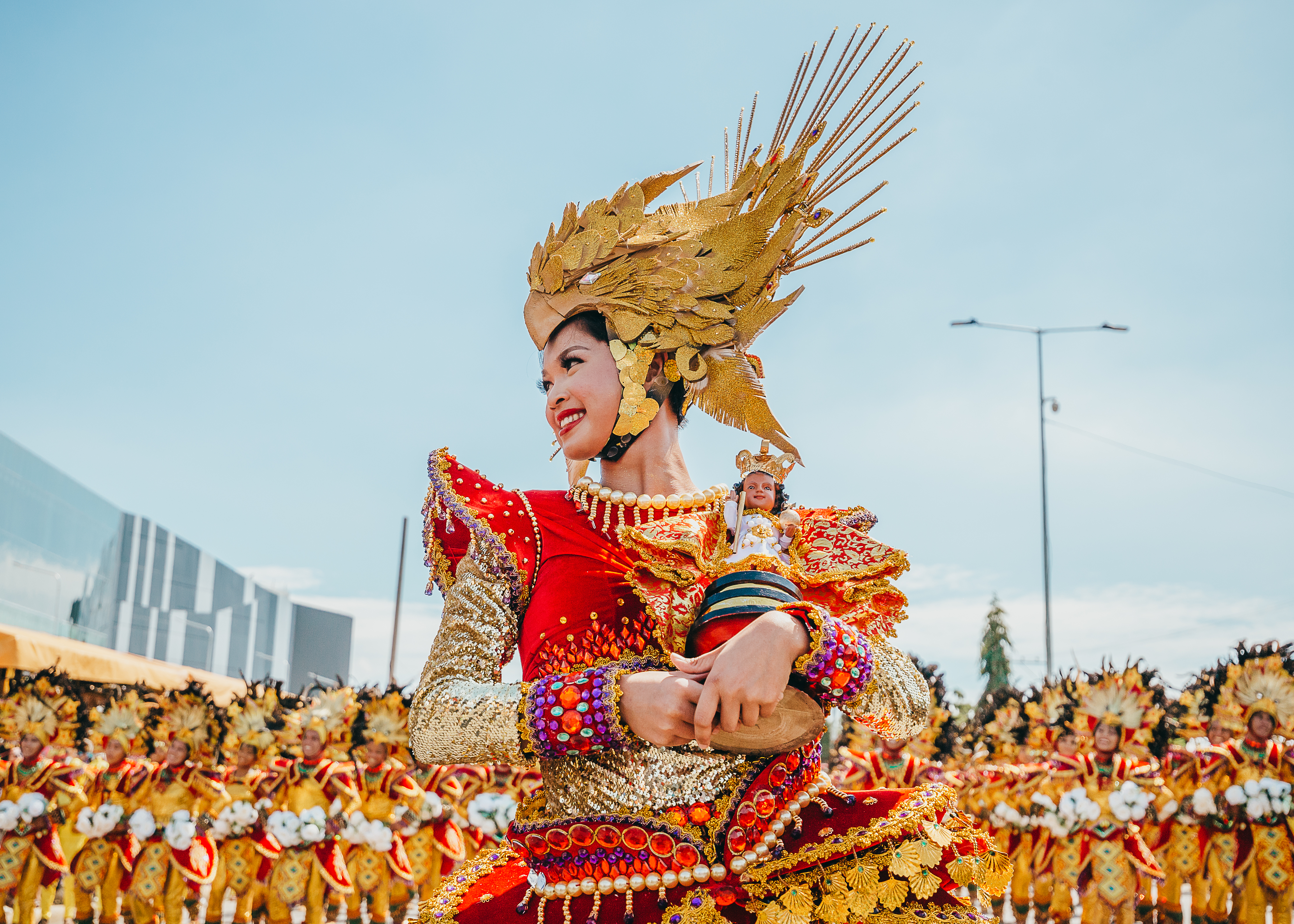
Sinulog Festival, one of the grandest festivals in the Philippines held in Cebu.

Ati-Atihan Festival is celebrated every third Sunday in January, like Sinulog Festival. It is held in Kalibo, Aklan, on Panay Island, where the first indigenous Ati people settled. This festival devotes to the mystery of baby Jesus and Indigenous people. The people who participate paint their bodies and face and wear indigenous costumes and props. The festival included music, drums, and parades for several days.

Dinagyang Festival is celebrated in Iloilo City on the fourth Sunday of January. This festival marks the baby Jesus Senior Sto. Nino. At Ati-Atihan Festival in Aklan, Dinagyang also has Ati's dancing to celebrate the entry of Malay in Panay Island, colorful costumes, and a Pageant for Miss Iloilo; Sadsad is a procession with a decorated float. Schools and businesses in Barangays in this city participate in dancing competitions at this festival.

== Cebuano versus Bisaya ==
There has been ongoing contention regarding the use of the word Bisaya among speakers of Visayan languages. The term Bisaya broadly refers to the people of the Visayas region in the Philippines, as well as those who have migrated to other parts of the country, including Luzon and Mindanao. The Visayas region encompasses several ethnolinguistic groups and languages, including Hiligaynon, Cebuano, Waray, and others, which are distinct and not mutually intelligible, despite belonging to the same language family.

Over the years, Bisaya has often been used interchangeably with Cebuano in many parts of the country, though this practice is context-dependent and varies across regions. Cebuano-speaking settlers in Mindanao and other areas outside Cebu frequently refer to themselves and their language as Bisaya to distinguish themselves from the people of Cebu and their dialect. To address this ambiguity, some propose using the term Sinugbuanong Binisaya (which has been the term used in basic education) to specify Cebuano, while others suggest Binisaya as a broader term. Surveys, such as those conducted by the Philippine Statistics Authority (PSA), often separate Bisaya and Cebuano, despite the two being mutually intelligible. Ethnologue, however, only lists Cebuano as a language. In Western Visayas, Bisaya may refer to Hiligaynon or Kinaray-a speakers, whereas in Eastern Visayas, it may denote Waray speakers.

In Mindanao, migrant ethnic groups from Luzon and indigenous peoples have assimilated into predominantly Cebuano-speaking societies (or Hiligaynon-speaking communities in the case of Soccsksargen) over the years. Many of these individuals now identify as Visayans after learning Cebuano, though they often retain knowledge of their non-Visayan roots and may still speak their ancestral languages fluently as a second or third language.

== See also ==
- Visayans
- Regions of the Philippines
- Provinces of the Philippines
- Mindanao
- Luzon
