= Laon (deity) =

Philippine god

- Creation, Agriculture, the Sky, Divine Justice
- Gender: Female (Male as Makapatag)

Laon (meaning "the ancient one"), (Note: From Visayan laon meaning "ancient" or "old.") is a pre-colonial supreme creator deity in the animist anito beliefs of the Visayan peoples in the Philippines. She is associated with creation, agriculture, the sky, and divine justice. Her domain is usually identified with the volcano Kanlaon (Note: Literally "[place] of Laon") of the island of Negros, the highest peak in the Visayas Islands. She is present in the pre-colonial beliefs of the Aklanon, Capiznon, Cebuano, Hiligaynon, Karay-a, Suludnon, and Waray people, among others. Her name is variously rendered as Lahon, Lalaon (or Lalahon), Lauon, Malaon, Raom, and Laonsina (or Alunsina) among the different Visayan groups.

== Description ==
Although usually spoken of as female, she has both female and male aspects. She was sometimes referred to as Makapatag (also spelled Macapatag in Spanish sources, literally "the leveler"), her male aspect. She was regarded as a milder and more sympathetic deity of justice and equality in her female form than in her male form, Makapatag, the destructive deity of punishment and vengeance. As a supreme creator deity, Laon is also identified with Makaako, who is said to dwell in the uppermost level of the seven layers of the universe.

Laon is usually mentioned in the various Visayan creation myths as the creator of the first creature (a bird, usually a manaul) who finds the first islands and indirectly causes the emergence of other creatures, including the first man and woman whom it finds inside either a bamboo or rattan stem. In ancient times, shamans (babaylan) would climb up the volcano and do rituals every good harvest season or when there was a special ceremony. They would also offer gifts as a sign of respect.

She was first recorded as "Lalahon" or "Lahon" by the conquistador Miguel de Loarca in Relación de las Yslas Filipinas (1582). De Loarca specifically identifies her as female and records that Lalahon was an agricultural deity invoked by the natives for good harvests. When she was displeased, she would send locusts to spoil the crops. De Loarca also specifically mentions that she dwells in the Kanlaon volcano.

Laon is sometimes erroneously identified as a goddess of fire, due to the English mistranslation of De Loarca's description in The Philippine Islands, 1493–1898 (Blair & Robertson, 1903). The book mistranslates the original Spanish ("...que heçha fuego") as "she hurls fire" instead of the correct "[the volcano]... which hurls fire".

In Relación de las Islas Filipinas (1604), the Jesuit priest Pedro Chirino records the name of the spirit as "Laon" and identifies it as a creator deity, equivalent to the Tagalog Bathala. In Historia natural del sitio, fertilidad y calidad de las Islas e Indios de Bisayas (1668), the Jesuit priest Francisco Ignacio Alcina records her name among the Waray people as "Malaon", a creator deity and the female aspect of the Malaon-Makapatag duality.

In the Hinilawod epic of the Suludnon people of Panay, she was known as "Laonsina" (also "Alunsina") and was regarded as the goddess of the sky. Along with Tungkung Langit, they were the first two primordial deities in Suludnon creation myths. The suffix "sina" means "foreigner" and is likely a reference to her origin as an introduced deity from the other Visayan neighbors of the Suludnon. Laonsina is also regarded as a sky goddess among the neighboring Karay-a and Capiznon people.

== In other beliefs ==
Among the Bicolano people, Kalaon was instead regarded as the evil god of destruction, the main adversary of Batala, a minor deity of protection and luck (not to be confused with the Tagalog supreme deity Bathala). The Bicolano supreme deity was instead Gugurang (whose name also means "the old one") whose domain was the Mayon Volcano.

Among the Batak people of Sumatra, the oldest ancestor spirits are also known as silaon.

== See also ==
- Anito
- Kanlaon
- Maria Makiling
- Mayon
- Mount Apo
- Pele (deity)
- Guayota
- List of Philippine mythological figures
