= Surigaonon people =

Surigaonon
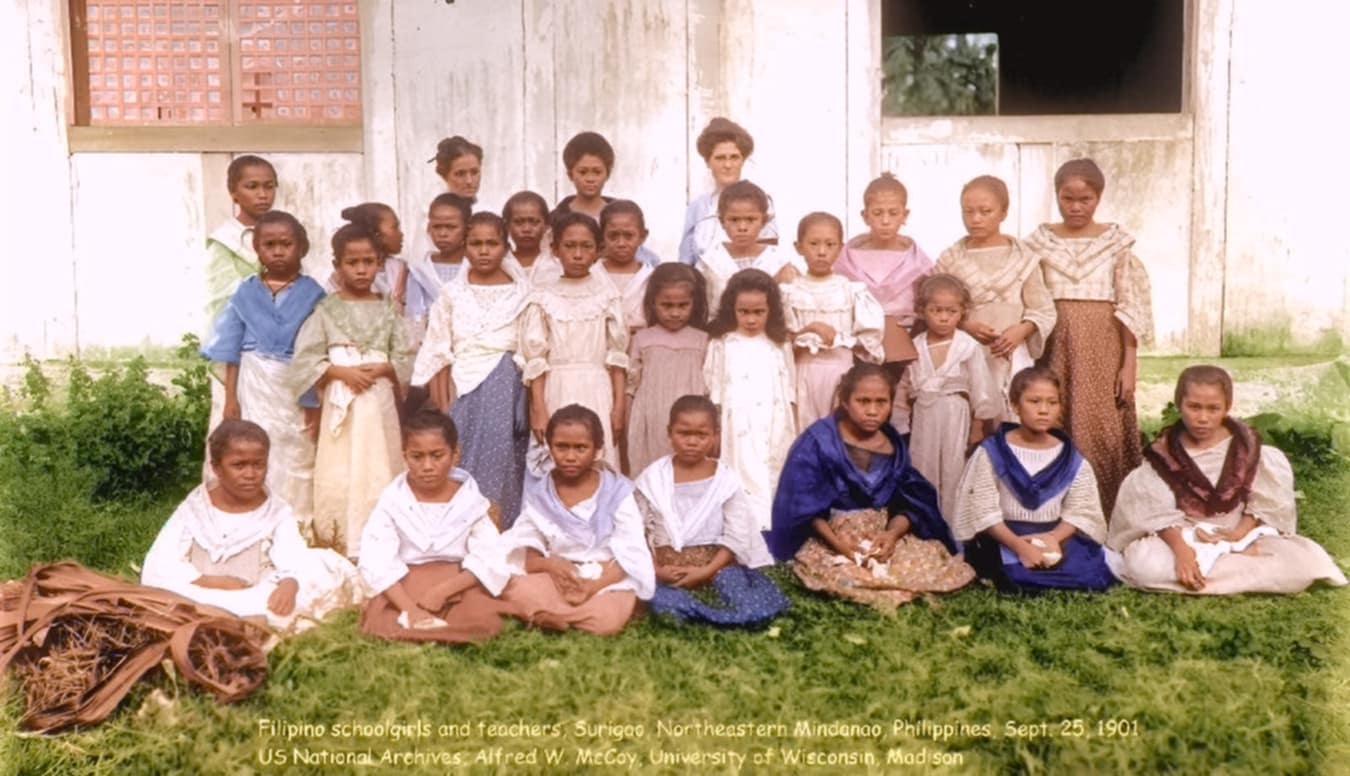
- Surigaonon students 1901

Total population
- 367,278 (2010)

Regions with significant populations
- Philippines (Caraga, Davao Region)

Languages
- Native; Surigaonon; Also; Cebuano (increasingly) • Filipino • English

Religion
- Predominantly; Christianity (majority Roman Catholicism • minority Aglipayan, Protestantism); Historically (Hinduism • Buddhism)

Related ethnic groups
- Other Visayan peoples; (Hiligaynon; Boholano; Cebuano; Masbateño; Waray; Butuanon; Aklanon; Capiznon; Cuyonon; Ratagnon; Karay-a; Romblomanon; Suludnon); Other Austronesian peoples

The Surigaonon people are an ethnolinguistic group who inhabited on the eastern coastal plain of Mindanao, particularly the provinces of Surigao del Norte, Surigao del Sur and Dinagat Islands. They are also present in the provinces of Agusan del Norte, Agusan del Sur, and in Davao Oriental. They are part of the Visayan ethnolinguistic group, who constitute the largest Filipino ethnolinguistic group in the country.

== History ==
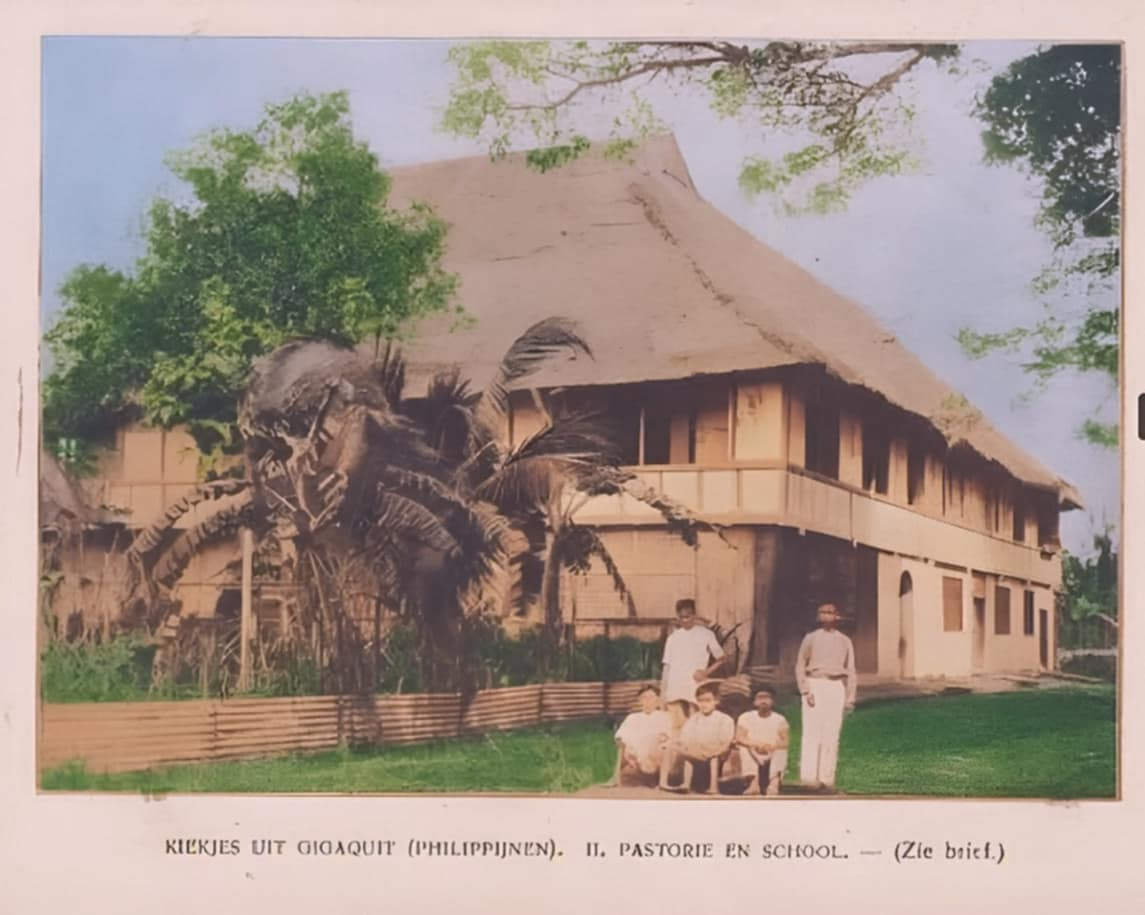
Surigaonon early with edfice in the background 1900's.

Rajah Siawi and Rajah Kulambo, members of the nobility of the Surigaonon and Butuanon people, respectively, were encountered by the Magellan expedition in 1521 on the island of Limasawa (which was a hunting ground for the rulers). Antonio Pigafetta describes them as being tattooed and covered in gold ornaments. Pigafetta also records the name of the Surigao region as "Calagan".

== Demographics ==
Currently, the Surigaonons number about 1,000,000 (estimates) based on the population of Surigao del Norte, Surigao del Sur and some speakers of Agusan del Norte.

Surigaonons are Austronesians, like almost all native Filipino ethnic groups. They are part of the wider Visayan ethnic group. Their language closely resembles Cebuano, albeit with some local words and phrases. Hence, it is considered by most linguists to be a separate language, the Surigaonon language. Because of the mass influx of Cebuano settlers to Mindanao, they also speak Cebuano as second language since Surigaonon is a Visayan language, other languages are Tagalog, and English as third languages. The vast majority of Surigaonons are Roman Catholics, very few are Muslims in contrast to its very closely related Tausug brothers which are predominantly Muslims.

== Language ==
Below is a table which demonstrates that Surigaonon is more related to Tausug than Cebuano:

English	Filipino (Tagalog)	Surigaonon	Tausug	Cebuano
What is your name?	Ano ang pangalan mo?	Umay ngayan mu?/Simay imu ngayan?	Hisiyu in ngān mu?	Unsa ang pangan nimo?
My name is Muhammad.	Ang pangalan ko ay si Muhammad.	An ako ngayan si Muhammad/ Ang ngayan ko si Muhammad.	In ngān ku Muhammad.	Ang pangan nako ay Muhammad.
How are you?	Kumusta ka na?	Kumosta na kaw?	Maunu-unu nakaw?	Kumusta na ka? / Nagunsa na man ka?
I am fine, (too)	Ayos lang ako.	Madayaw da isab aku (Tandaganon) or Marajaw ako (Surigaonon).	Marayaw da isab.	Maayo ra ko.
Where is Ahmad?	Nasaan si Ahmad?	Hain si Ahmad?/ Haman si Ahmad	Hawnu hi Ahmad?	Asa si Ahmad?
He is in the house.	Nasa bahay siya.	Sa bayay sija.	Ha bāy siya.	Sa balay sya.
Thank you	Salamat.	Salamat.	Magsukul.	Salamat.
‘I am staying at’ or ‘I live at’	Nakatira po ako sa.	Naghuya aku sa.	Naghuhula’ aku ha.	Nagpuyo ako sa.
I am here at the house.	Nandito ako say bahay.	Jari aku sa bayay.	Yari aku ha bay.	Ni-a ko sa bay.
I am Hungry.	Nagugutom ako.	In-gutom aku./ Tag gutom aku.	Hiyapdi' aku.	Gi-gutom ko.
He is there, at school.	Nandoon siya sa paaralan.	Jadtu sija sa iskuylahan.	Yadtu siya ha iskul.	Tu-a sya sa iskul.
Person	Tao	Tawo	Tau	Tawo
River	Ilog	Suba	Sug	Suba

== Culture ==
The Surigaonons, like the closely related Butuanon people, are part of the larger Visayan group and have a culture similar to the Cebuanos. Pre-Hispanic Surigaonons are very fond of ornamental designs and displays. Most Surigaonons are agriculturalists.

== See also ==
Surigaonon language

Caraga

- Surigao del Norte
- Surigao del Sur

Ethnic groups in the Philippines

- Bisaya peoples
  - Butuanon people
  - Cebuano people
  - Tausūg people
