= Suludnon =

Suludon people
Panayanon Sulud
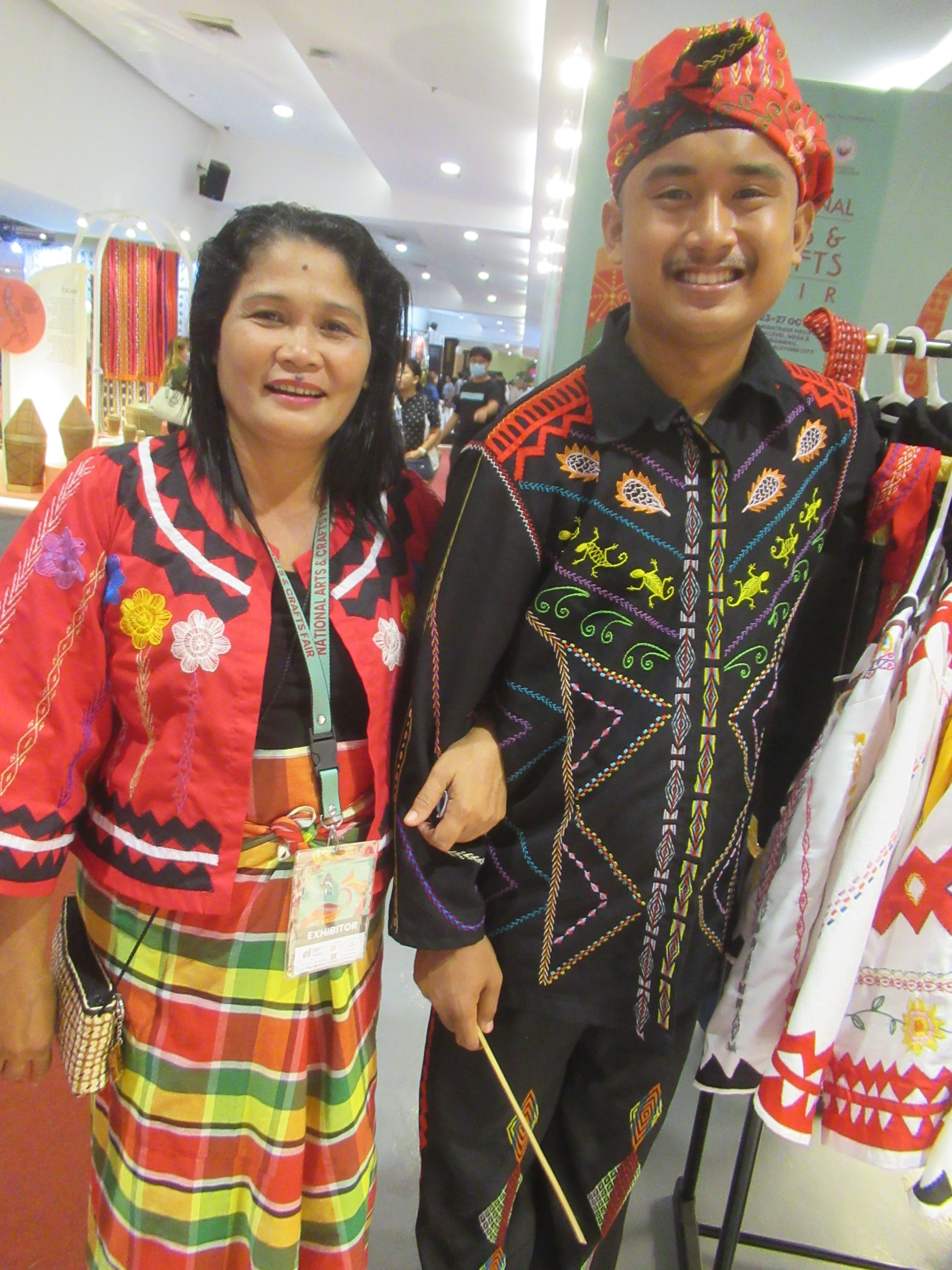

Total population
- 81,189 (2010)

Regions with significant populations
- Philippines (Western Visayas)

Languages
- Native; Sulodnon; Also; Hiligaynon • Kinaray-a • Aklanon • Filipino • English

Religion
- Traditional religion and Folk Christianity (Roman Catholic).

Related ethnic groups
- Other Visayan peoples; (Hiligaynon; Boholano; Cebuano; Masbateño; Waray; Butuanon; Aklanon; Surigaonon; Capiznon; Cuyonon; Ratagnon; Karay-a; Romblomanon); Other Austronesian peoples

The Suludnon, also known as the Panay-Bukidnon, Pan-ayanon, or Tumandok, are a Visayan group of people who reside in the Capiz-Antique-Iloilo mountainous area of Panay in the Visayan islands of the Philippines. They are one of the two only mostly non-Christianized group of Visayan language-speakers in the Western Visayas, along with the Halawodnon of Lambunao and Calinog, Iloilo and Iraynon-Bukidnon of Antique. Also, they are part of the wider Visayan ethnolinguistic group, who constitute the largest Filipino ethnolinguistic group.

Although they were once culturally related to the speakers of the Kinaray-a, Aklanon, and Hiligaynon languages, all of whom inhabit the lowlands of Panay, their isolation from Spanish rule resulted in the continuation of a pre-Hispanic culture and beliefs. They speak the Iigbok language (also known as Ligbok or Sulod language), a member of the West Bisayan subdivision of the Bisayan languages within the Austronesian language family.

The Panay Bukidnon are known for their Binanog dance, which mimics the flight of the Philippine eagle, accompanied by an agung ensemble. Another dance of the same name is also performed by the Bukidnon Lumad of Mindanao, suggesting a cultural connection between the people of the Western Visayas and northern Mindanao in ancient times. Apart from this, they also practice the use of bamboo musical instruments, which they use to express themselves in traditional songs, dances, and epics. They are also known for their detailed embroidery, known as panubok. The heritage of the panubok is celebrated in the Tinubkan fashion show in Iloilo City. The Sulud are also known for their traditional practices on the mysticism of the binukot and nabukot.

Currently, the Sulud/Panay Bukidnon faces several challenges in their existence although the local governments of Panay have realized their importance and have begun establishing several projects that help preserve their culture.

== See also ==
- Visayans
  - Aklanon people
  - Boholano people
  - Capiznon people
  - Cebuano people
  - Cuyunon people
  - Hiligaynon people
  - Karay-a people
  - Masbateño people
  - Romblomanon people
  - Waray people
