= Butuanon =

Butuanon may refer to:

- The Butuanon language, an Austronesian language and member of the Visayan language family, spoken in the Philippines
- The Butuanon people, speakers of the Butuanon language
- Butuan and its residents, in the Agusan del Norte province of the Philippines
