= Cuyunon people =

Cuyonon
Total population
- 243,384

Regions with significant populations
- Philippines: Palawan

Languages
- Native; Cuyonon; Also; Hiligaynon • Filipino • English

Religion
- Predominantly; Christianity (majority Roman Catholicism • minority Aglipayan and Protestantism)

Related ethnic groups
- Other Visayan peoples; (Hiligaynon; Boholano; Cebuano; Masbateño; Waray; Butuanon; Aklanon; Surigaonon; Capiznon; Ratagnon; Karay-a; Romblomanon; Suludnon); Other Austronesian peoples

Cuyonon refers to an ethnic group populating the Cuyo Islands, along with northern and central Palawan. The Cuyonons hail originally from Cuyo and the surrounding Cuyo Islands, a group of islands and islets in the northern Sulu Sea, to the northeast of Palawan. They are considered an elite class among the hierarchy of native Palaweños. They are part of the wider Visayan ethnolinguistic group, who constitute the largest Filipino ethnolinguistic group.

== History ==
The Cuyonon jurisdictions during Pre-Hispanic times include Cuyo under the powerful Datu Magbanua, Taytay under the gracious Cabaylo Royal Family who met the remnants of Magellan's fleet who fled Mactan after Ferdinand Magellan died in battle, Paragua (Palawan) under Datu Cabangon who ruled south of Taytay and Busuanga under the peaceful Datu Macanas.

During Spanish colonization of the Philippines, Cuyo was one of the territories of Palawan that had the strongest Spanish presence, even being the capital of the entire Palawan province as one point.

== Cuyonon culture ==
=== Significant populations ===
Although the Cuyonon language is so closely related to Kinaray-a in Panay, very few Cuyonons actually live or speak Cuyonon in Panay, they instead settled west to the island of Palawan where the ethnic group is so closely associated now, this being the province of Palawan declared Cuyonon as its official language. The fact also remains that most of the other ethnic groups of Palawan can fluently speak this language because Cuyonon had been the lingua franca of the province of Palawan for many centuries already.

=== Immortals ===
- Diwata ng Kagubatan: goddess of the forest honored on top of Mount Caimana in Cuyo island
- Neguno: the god of the sea that cursed a selfish man by turning him into the first shark

== See also ==
- Tagalog people
- Kapampangan people
- Ilocano people
- Ivatan people
- Igorot people
- Pangasinan people
- Bicolano people
- Negrito
- Visayans
  - Aklanon people
  - Boholano people
  - Capiznon people
  - Cebuano people
  - Hiligaynon people
  - Karay-a people
  - Masbateño people
  - Romblomanon people
  - Suludnon
  - Waray people
- Lumad
- Moro people
