= Karay-a =

Karay-a may refer to:

- Karay-a people of the Philippines
- Karay-a language, spoken by the Karay-a people
