= Boholano people =

Katawhang Bol-anon
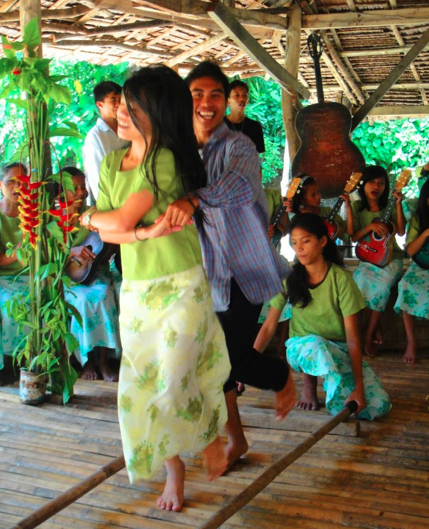
- Some Boholano people dancing Tinikling

Total population
- 1,872,005 (2020 census)

Regions with significant populations
- Philippines (Bohol, Southern Leyte, northeastern Mindanao)

Languages
- Boholano Cebuano, Filipino, English

Religion
- Predominantly; Christianity (majority Roman Catholicism • minority Aglipayan , Protestantism)

Related ethnic groups
- Other Visayan peoples; (Hiligaynon; Cebuano; Masbateño; Waray; Butuanon; Aklanon; Surigaonon; Capiznon; Cuyonon; Ratagnon; Karay-a; Romblomanon; Suludnon); Other Austronesian peoples

The Boholano people, also called Bol-anon, refers to the people who live in the island province of Bohol. They are considered part of the larger Cebuano people people who in turn are part of the wider Visayan ethnolinguistic group, who constitute the second largest Filipino ethnolinguistic group.

== Language ==
Boholano is a dialect of Cebuano that is spoken on the island of Bohol in the Philippines, which is a Visayan speech variety, although it is sometimes described as a separate language by some linguists and native speakers. Boholano, especially the dialects used in Central Bohol, can be distinguished from other Cebuano dialects by a few phonetic changes. The "y" sound in Cebuano becomes "j" ("iya" in Cebuano becomes "ija"), the "k" sound sometimes becomes "h" ("ako" in Cebuano becomes "aho"), the "l" sound sometimes if it is used in the second or following syllable becomes "w" ("kulang" in Cebuano becomes "kuwang"). The dialects used in the coastal areas of Bohol though, including Tagbilaran City, are almost indistinguishable from other Cebuano-speaking areas. Since Boholanos are a different ethnolinguistic group from Cebuanos, the Boholano dialect is sometimes considered as a separate language from Cebuano.

== Demographics ==
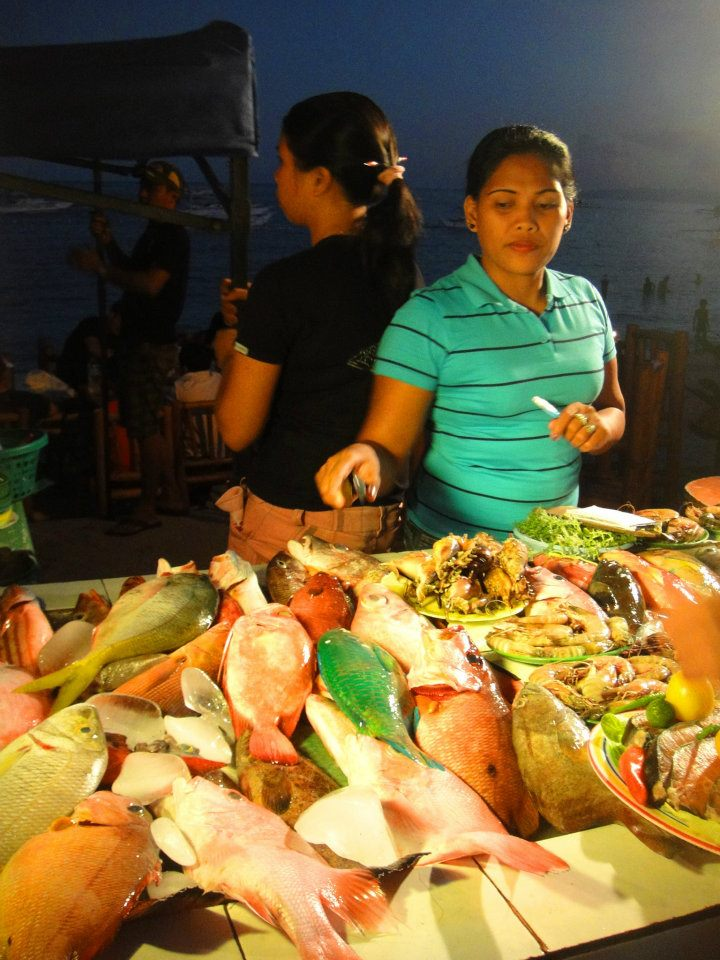
A Boholana fish vendor.

There were 2,278,495 of them in 2010. They are mainly concentrated in Bohol although some also live in Southern Leyte and Mindanao (mainly in the northeastern portion). The majority of the population is Roman Catholic adherents or other Christian denominations. Others practices traditional indigenous religions.

== Culture ==
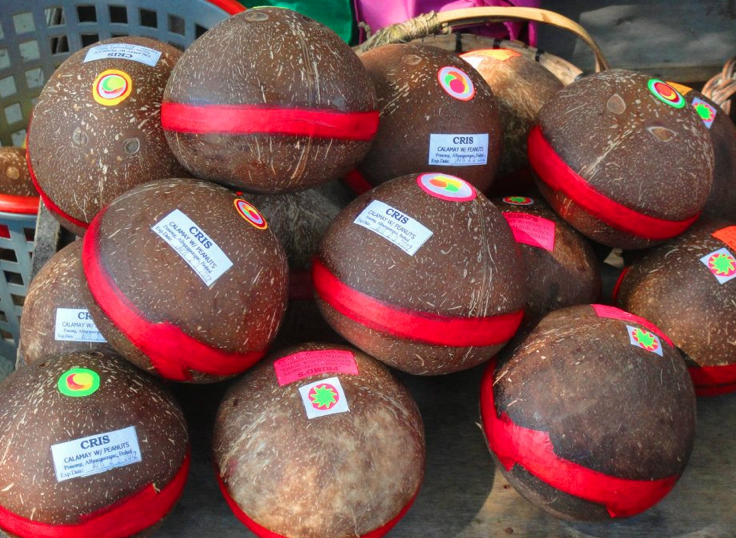
Kalamay, a sweet viscous dessert of Bohol traditionally packaged into empty coconut shells.

The Boholano culture is much like the culture of the Philippines (specifically of the Visayas). It is based on the majority population of Austronesian peoples on the island. There are influences from indigenous Melanesian people such as the Eskaya tribe, and from the colonizing Spanish and trade with Mexico. There is also influence in the culture from China and other Asian countries.

== History ==
The people of Bohol are said to be the descendants of the last group of inhabitants who settled in the Philippines called pintados or “tattooed ones.” Boholanos already have a culture of their own as evidenced by the artifacts dug at Mansasa, Tagbilaran City, and in Dauis and Panglao.

Bohol is derived from the native word Bo-ol. The island was the seat of the first international treaty of peace and unity between the native king Datu Sikatuna, and Spanish conquistador, Miguel López de Legazpi, on March 16, 1565, through a blood compact alliance known today by many Filipinos as the Sandugo.

== Religion ==
Most Boholanos are Catholic, with a minority professing Protestant faith. The former indigenous Boholano religion was animistic.
