= Capiznon people =

Capiznon people (Capizeño)
Total population
- 710,273

Regions with significant populations
- Philippines (Capiz, Aklan, Iloilo, and Masbate)

Languages
- Native; Capiceño/Capiznon; Also; Hiligaynon • Masbateño • Aklanon • Filipino • English

Religion
- Predominantly; Christianity (majority Roman Catholicism • minority Aglipayan and Protestantism)

Related ethnic groups
- Other Visayan peoples; (Hiligaynon; Boholano; Cebuano; Masbateño; Waray; Butuanon; Aklanon; Surigaonon; Cuyonon; Ratagnon; Karay-a; Romblomanon; Suludnon); Other Austronesian peoples

The Capiznons (Capiznon: mga Capiznon; Spanish: capiceños) are a Visayan ethnic group native to Capiz and the surrounding areas of the Western Visayas region of the Philippines. They speak Capiceño, a Visayan language closely related to Hiligaynon. Because of their linguistic and cultural similarities, they are often considered part of the larger Hiligaynon people. According to Spanish era tribute-censuses Spanish-Filipinos compose 1% of the Capiznon people's population.

== Notable Capiznons (Capizeños) ==
This list includes people with roots from Capiz.

=== Art ===
- Pierre Patricio, Self-taught visual artist

=== Business ===
- Edgar Sia, is the chairman of DoubleDragon Properties and the founder of Mang Inasal fast food restaurant chain

=== Politics ===
- Jocelyn Bolante, Politician who formerly served as an Undersecretary of the Department of Agriculture of the Philippines.
- Fredenil Castro, A member of the National Unity Party, he has been elected to five terms as a Member of the House of Representatives of the Philippines, representing the Second District of Capiz.
- Pedro Gil, was a physician, journalist, and legislator. He was elected representative for the south district of Manila on the Democratra party ticket. He became Minority Floor Leader in the House of Representatives of the Philippines.
- Jose Hontiveros, Senator of the Insular Government of the Philippine Islands, Associate Justice of the Supreme Court of the Philippines, former Governor of Capiz (including Aklan)
- Risa Hontiveros, Senator of the Philippines, Akbayan Representative in Congress, granddaughter of Governor Hontiveros
- Manuel Roxas, the fifth President of the Philippines and the 1913 bar topnotcher
- Gerardo Roxas, Philippine Senator and son of President Manuel Roxas
- Mar Roxas, former Senator of the Republic of the Philippines and former Secretary of DOTC, DTI and DILG
- Gerardo Roxas, Jr., grandson of President Manuel Roxas and former Congressman
- Roy Señeres, Filipino statesman and diplomat
- Antonio Trillanes, is a retired Navy officer and former Philippines senator.
- Cornelio Villareal, was a Filipino politician who served as Speaker of the House of Representatives of the Philippines from 1962 to 1967, and again from 1971 to 1972. Popularly known as Kune, his congressional career representing the Second District of Capiz spanned six decades.

=== Entertainment ===
- Daisy Avellana, actress and theater director
- Sharmaine Arnaiz, actress.
- Gina Alajar, actress and director
- Ryan Eigenmann, actor and son of Gina Alajar
- Geoff Eigenmann, actor, brother of Ryan Eigenmann, son of Gina Alajar

- Charlie Davao, actor
- Ricky Davao, actor and director.
- Bing Davao, actor.
- Cheska Garcia, actress and endorser.
- Kendra Kramer, endorser.
- Patrick Garcia, actor.
- Edu Manzano, actor, politician and endorser.
- Luis Manzano, actor, host and endorser.
- Bunny Paras, actress.
- Jo Berry, actress.
- Jovita Fuentes, national artist for music.
- Rose Van Ginkel, actress.
- Mary Ann Basa, “Bangus Girl”, vlogger and actress.

=== Media ===
- Paolo Bediones, Filipino commercial model, television host, journalist, newscaster and radio announcer
- Kara David, television host and journalist.

=== Medicine ===
- Vicki Belo, well-known dermatologist, daughter of Enrique “Ike” Belo of Pan-ay Capiz

=== Music ===
- Barbie Almalbis, rock artist, former frontman of Barbie's Cradle and Hungry Young Poets
- Emil Mijares, was a jazz vibist and pianist, and was a musical director on Filipino television, as well as a composer, arranger, bandleader and producer.
- Mikoy Morales, is an actor, Singer & Model. He joined the Protégé: The Battle For The Big Artista Break.
- Jovita Fuentes, Dubbed the First Lady of Philippine Music. The first female recipient of the National Artist Award.
- Linn Bermudez, is a singer-artist. She joined the Protege: The Battle For The Big Break and finished third place in the finals.

=== Beauty Pageants ===
- Margarita Moran-Floirendo, Miss Universe 1973
- Geraldine Villarruz Asis, Bb. Pilipinas-Universe 1987, Miss Universe 1987 finalist

=== Social sciences ===
- Josepha Abiertas first female Filipino lawyer and bar topnotcher
- Eugene A. Tan, Human rights lawyer, author, and professor of law. He was murdered in 1994.

=== Sports ===
- Mac Belo, basketball player. A son of a Capiznon from Pan-ay, Capiz who migrated to Cotabato.
- Jeckster Apinan, professional basketball player.
- Peter Glenn Yap, former professional basketball player.

== Indigenous Capiznon religion ==
=== Immortals ===
- Laon: the supreme deity; a goddess said to reside in the mountain at the neighboring island of Negros
- Bulalakaw: a bird god who looks like a peacock and can cause illnesses; lives in Mount Madja-as
- Mediators to the Gods
  - Bangutbanwa: ensures good harvests and an orderly universe
  - Mangindalon: intercedes for sick persons; punishes enemies
  - Soliran: one of two performers of the marriage ceremonies
  - Solian: one of two performers of the marriage ceremonies
  - Manunubo: the good spirit of the sea
- Tungkung Langit: the god of the sky who brings famine, drought, storms, and floods
- Lulid-Batang: the god of the earth, responsible for earthquakes and volcanic eruptions
- Linting Habughabug: the god of lightning, whose look kills people and who shouts in anger
- Launsina: the goddess of the sun, moon, stars, and seas, and the most beloved because people seek forgiveness from her
- Burigadang Pada Sinaklang Bulawan: the goddess of greed to whom people pray when they want to get rich
- Saragnayan: the god of darkness who has the power to replace brightness with darkness
- Lubay-lubyuk Hanginun si Mahuyuk-huyukun: the goddess of the evening breeze; cools people, especially during the summer
- Suklang Malayun: the guardian of happy homes
- Maklilum-sa-twan: the god of the plains and valleys.
- Agurang: the good spirit who fought against Asuwang
- Asuwang: the malevolent spirit who fought against Asuwang

== See also ==
- Capiz
- Capiznon language
- Negrito
- Visayan people
  - Aklanon people
  - Boholano people
  - Cebuano people
  - Cuyunon people
  - Eskaya people
  - Hiligaynon people
  - Karay-a people
  - Masbateño people
  - Porohanon people
  - Romblomanon people
  - Suludnon
  - Waray people
- Lumad
- Moro people
