= Romblomanon =

Romblomanon may refer to:

- the Romblomanon people
- the Romblomanon language
