= Butuanon people =

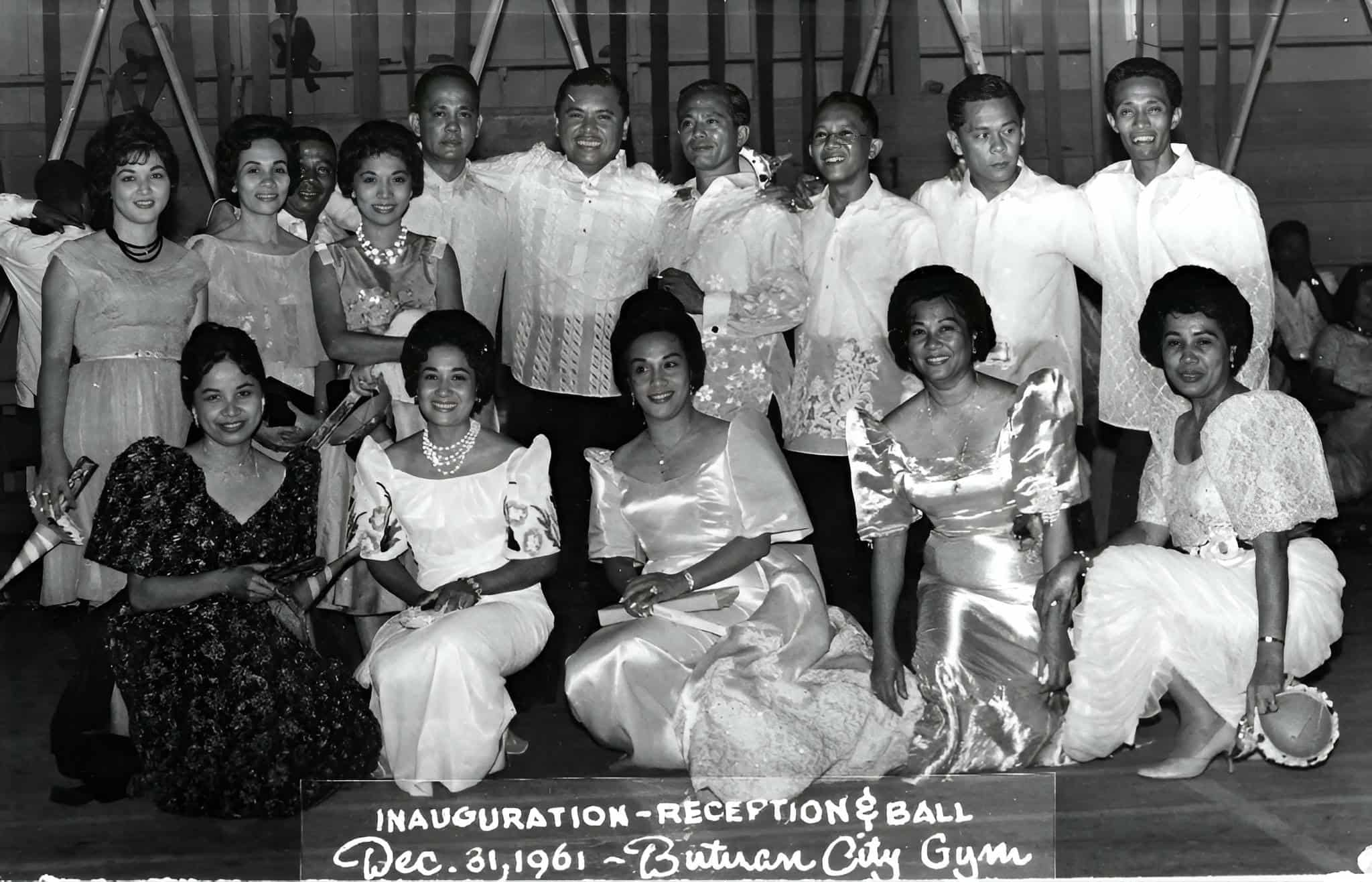
- Butuanon gathering, circa 1961

Total population
- 1,420,000 (2000 census)

Regions with significant populations
- Philippines: Caraga, Cebu, Cagayan de Oro, Metro Manila

Languages
- Native; Butuanon; Also; Cebuano (increasingly) • Filipino • English

Religion
- Predominantly; Christianity (majority Roman Catholicism • minority Aglipayan and Protestantism); Minority; Animism; Historically; Hinduism • Buddhism

Related ethnic groups
- Other Visayan peoples; (Hiligaynon; Boholano; Cebuano; Masbateño; Waray; Aklanon; Surigaonon; Capiznon; Cuyonon; Ratagnon; Karay-a; Romblomanon; Suludnon); Other Austronesian peoples

The Butuanon, also known interchangeably by the endonym Lapaknon, are an ethnolinguistic group who primarily inhabit the region of Caraga, Philippines.

They are part of the wider Visayan peoples.

== Area ==
Butuanons live in the provinces of Agusan del Norte and Agusan del Sur. Some live in Misamis Oriental or in Surigao del Norte, all of which are in the northeastern corner of Mindanao.

== Demographics ==
Butuanons number about 1,420,000. They are the descendants of Austronesian-speaking immigrants who came from South China during the Iron Age.

The native language of Butuanons is the Butuanon language, but most younger Butuanon nowadays primarily speak the Cebuano language, because of the mass influx of Cebuano settlers to Mindanao, and Filipino and English as second or third languages.

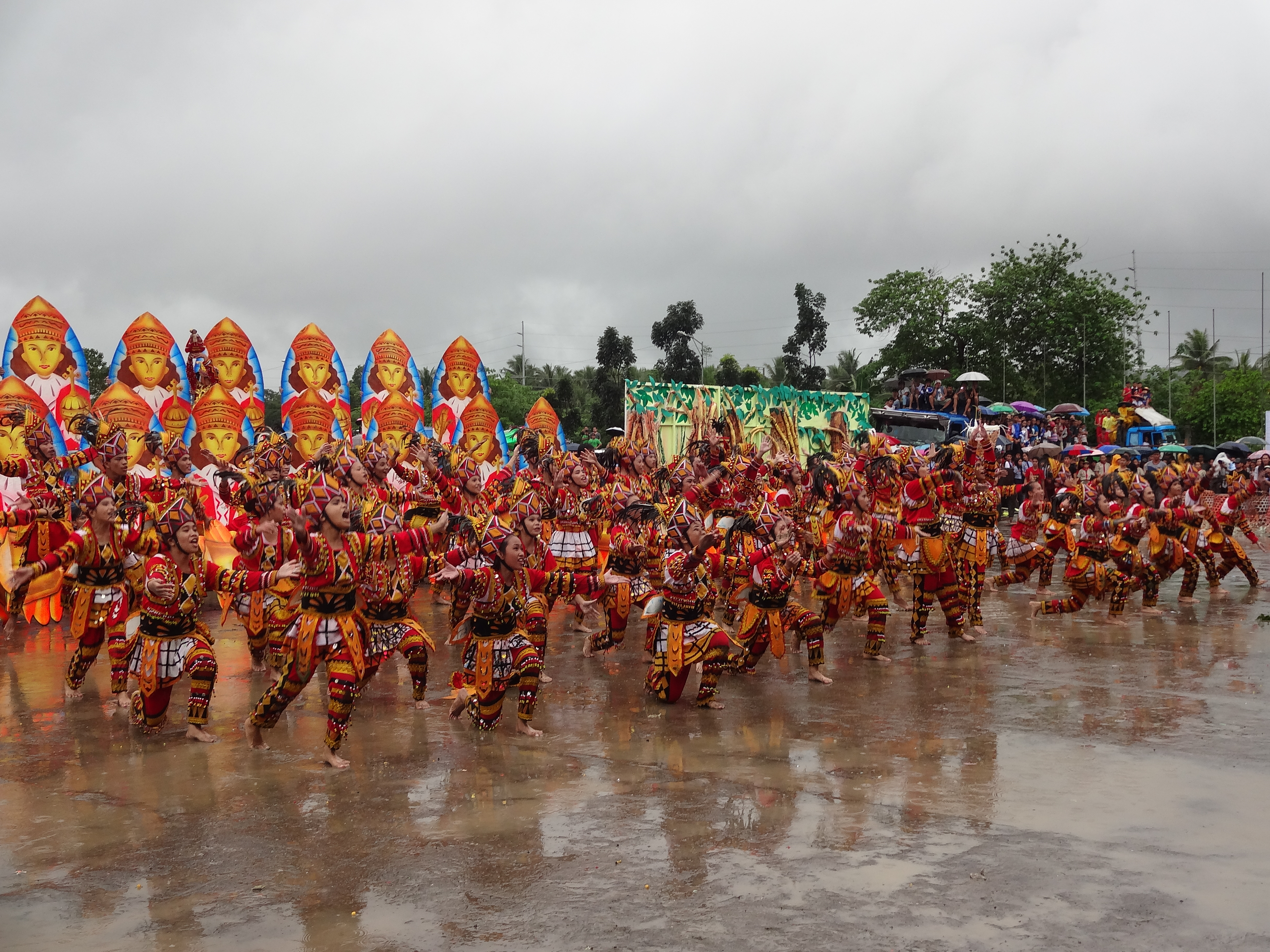
A dance number being presented at the annual Kahimunan Festival at the Libertad Sports Complex in Butuan. The festival is celebrated every January.

They founded the Butuan Kingdom in the 10th century.

While historically Hindu, Buddhist and animist, today most are Roman Catholics due to missionary activity under Spanish colonization, and a few are Protestant (including the Philippine Independent Church).

== See also ==
- Butuanon language
- Caraga
- Butuan
  - Butuan (historical polity)
- Ethnic groups in the Philippines
