= Karay-a people =

Ethnic group native to Panay and Palawan

Regions with significant populations
- Philippines: Western Visayas, Palawan, Mindoro

Languages
- Native; Kinaray-a; Also; Hiligaynon • Caluyanon • Aklanon • Filipino • English

Religion
- Predominantly; Christianity (majority Roman Catholicism • minority Aglipayan and Protestantism)

Related ethnic groups
- Other Visayan peoples; (Hiligaynon; Boholano; Cebuano; Masbateño; Waray; Butuanon; Aklanon; Surigaonon; Capiznon; Cuyonon; Ratagnon; Romblomanon; Suludnon); Other Austronesian peoples

The Karay-a are a Visayan ethnic group native to the islands of Panay and Palawan in the Philippines. They speak the Karay-a language (Kinaray-a: Kinaray-a).

== Etymology ==
The ethnonym Karay-a was derived from the word iraya, which means "upstream". The term Hamtikanon, literally "of Antique", is incorrectly used as a synonym of Karay-a; however, it properly refers to registered residents of the province of Antique irrespective of ethnicity.

== Area ==
=== Antique ===
- Anini-y
- Tobias Fornier
- Hamtic
- San Jose
- Belison
- Sibalom
- San Remigio
- Patnongon
- Bugasong
- Valderrama
- Laua-an
- Barbaza
- Tibiao
- Culasi
- Sebaste
- Pandan
- Libertad
- Caluya

=== Iloilo ===
- Alimodian
- Leon
- San Miguel
- San Enrique
- Santa Barbara
- San Joaquin
- Bingawan
- Calinog
- Lambunao
- Passi City
- San Rafael
- Badiangan
- Janiuay
- Zarraga
- Cabatuan
- Maasin
- New Lucena
- Mina
- Pototan
- Tubungan
- Oton
- Dueñas
- Tigbauan
- Igbaras
- Guimbal
- Miag-ao
- Dingle

=== Capiz ===
- Tapaz
- Jamindan
- Dumarao
- Dumalag

=== Aklan ===
- Nabas
- Buruanga
- Malay
- Libacao
- Madalag
- Ibajay
- Tangalan
- Makato
- Malinao

=== Palawan ===
- Taytay
- Narra
- El Nido
- Cagayancillo

=== Occidental Mindoro ===
- San Jose
- Magsaysay

== Demographics ==
The Karay-a number 363,000 in 2010 . They were first believed to be the descendants of immigrants from Borneo, through the epic-myth of the "Ten Bornean Datus". Recent findings, however, revealed that the ancestors of the Karay-a are the Austronesian-speaking immigrants who came from South China during the Iron Age. They primarily speak Karay-a. Meanwhile, Hiligaynon, Tagalog, and English are used as second languages. Most are Christians. About 80% are Roman Catholics, and the rest are Protestants. Some people belonging to the Suludnon tribe, are animists. As of 2015, there are about 1,300,000 Karay-a speakers all over the country. About 45% from Antique province, 38% from Iloilo and 7% in Palawan.

== Culture ==
Most Karay-a engage in agriculture, as well as in cottage industries. Several towns in Antique have the distinction of producing quality ware ranging from salakot and sawali from Belison, bamboo-craft from San Jose, ceramics from Sibalom, pottery from Bandoja, Tibiao; mats from Pandan and Libertad; and loom-woven patadyong (barrel skirt) from Bagtason, Bugasong, the only one of its kind in the Visayas and well known throughout Panay. Music, such as courtship songs, wedding hymns, and funeral recitals, is well-developed, as it is with dance.

== Indigenous Karay-a Religion ==
=== Immortals ===
- Maka-ako: the supreme deity residing on the uppermost level of the cosmic universe's seven layers
- Alunsina: the mother goddess of the Hinilawod epic heroes; aided in the battle against Saragnayon
- Laonsina: a sky goddess and grandmother of Nagmalitung Yawa
- Unnamed Sky God: a sky god who prevented Balanakon from traveling to Labaw Donggon's territory
- Tagna-an: the creator god and a busalian shaman; the most powerful and versatile of all ma-aram shamans
- Hugna-an: the first man; a ma-aram shaman and child of Tagna-an
- Humihinahon: the first woman; a ma-aram shaman and child of Tagna-an
- Kapapu-an: the pantheon of ancestral spirits from whom the supernatural powers of shamans originated from; their aid enables specific types of shamans to gush water from rocks, leap far distances, create oil shields, become invisible, or pass through solid matter
- Papu Estrella Bangotbanwa: a deified shaman who controlled the forces of nature
- Sidapa: god who establishes a person's lifespan through a very tall tree on Mount Madia-as
- Pandaque: god who allows the souls of the dead to enter Mount Madya-as, the home of the dead, if a proper mag-anito ritual is held
- Simuran: a god who takes the souls to the lower regions
- Siginarugan: a god who takes the souls to the lower regions
- Bangle: carries the non-liquefied soul across the water; the way he carries the soul differs depending on the soul's answers to his questions
- Bagubu: deity of the stream which follows after the crossing with Bangle

=== Mortals ===
- Labaw Donggon: an epic hero who journeyed to many lands
- Gimbitinan: a wife of Labaw Donggon; mother of the hero Asu Mangga
- Anggoy Doronoon: a wife of Labaw Donggon; mother of the hero Buyung Baranugun
- Yawa Sinagmaling: the wife of the lord, Saragnayon; Labaw Donggon fell in love with her, leading to the battle between Labaw Donggon and Saragnayon
- Saragnayon: husband of Yawa Sinagmaling; became a mortal after the wild boar which safeguards his immortality was defeated
- Asu Mangga: hero son of Gimbitinan and Labaw Donggon; fought Saragnayon for the release of his father
- Buyung Baranugun: hero son of Anggoy Doronoon and Labaw Donggon; fought Saragnayon for the release of his father
- Humadapnon: an epic hero; brother of Labaw Donggon and husband of Nagmalitung Yawa; aided by an enchanted tree and three messengers birds in the courting of Nagmaliyung Yawa
- Nagmalitung Yawa: a powerful binukot who rescued her husband by transforming herself into a man named Buyung Sunmasakay; defeated the thousand army in Tarangban; when her mother Matan-ayon was in old age, a ritual was conducted where Nagmalitung Yawa found out about Humadapnon's promiscuity; Matan-ayon's powers were transferred to her, and she ascended into heaven with the aid of her grandmother Laonsina
- Malubay Hanginon: a powerful binukot who captured and imprisoned by Humadapnon; defeated by Nagmalitung Yawa under her male form
- Paglambuhan: a warrior who was keeping the Timpara Alimuon sacred boat in his fortress; defeated by Nagmalitung Yawa, Humadapnon, and Dumalapdap
- Matan-ayon: mother of Nagmalitung Yawa; thinking that Humadapnon has died, makes Nagmalitung Yawa pregnant to compel to her marriage with the revived Paglambuhan; Humadapnon later kills the couple, but is reunited with the revived Nagmalitung Yawa; in the Sugidanon epic, she married the reluctant Labaw Donggon
- Dumalapdap: an epic hero; brother of Labaw Donggon
- Tikim Kadlum: an enchanted dog that rouses the ire of the monster Makabagting
- Datu Paiburong: owner of Tikim Kadlum
- Amburukay: married to Labaw Donggon after she consented her golden pubic hair to be used in Labaw Donggon's kudyapi
- Pahagunon: an underworld being who abducts one of Labaw Donggon's wife, Ayon
- Ayon: abducted by Pahagunon after Labaw Donggon transformed into a sea turtle
- Giant Crab Master: a master who has a giant crab follower, who aids in the abduction of one of Labaw Donggon's wives; his loyal crab can transform into an island with betel-nut trees
- Sanagnayan: a being whose life-force is in an egg in a lion's heart; the sister of Matan-ayon is rescued by Labaw Donggon from Sanagnayan
- Balanakon: prevented by the god of the sky from sailing into Labaw Donggon's territory, resulting in a long-drawn battle
