= Aklanon people =

Aklanon
Total population
- 559,416

Regions with significant populations
- Philippines: Panay, Metro Manila, Iloilo, Romblon

Languages
- Native; Aklanon; Also; Hiligaynon • Kinaray-a • Filipino • English

Religion
- Predominantly; Christianity (majority Roman Catholicism • minority Aglipayan and Protestantism)

Related ethnic groups
- Other Visayan peoples; (Hiligaynon; Boholano; Cebuano; Masbateño; Waray; Butuanon; Surigaonon; Capiznon; Cuyonon; Ratagnon; Karay-a; Romblomanon; Suludnon); Other Austronesian peoples

The Aklanon people are the ethnolinguistic group who lived in the province of Aklan. They are part of the wider Visayan ethnolinguistic group, who constitute the largest Filipino ethnolinguistic group.

== Area ==
Aklanon form the majority in the province of Aklan in Panay. They are also found in other Panay provinces such as Iloilo, Antique, and Capiz, as well as Romblon. Like the other Visayans, Aklanons have also found their way to Metro Manila, Mindanao, and even the United States.

== History ==
The Aklanons are descendants of the Austronesian-speaking immigrants who came to the Philippines during the Iron Age. They got their name from the river Akean, which means where there is boiling or frothing.

=== Minuro it Akean ===
Aklan, originally known as Minuro it Akean, is considered to be the oldest province in the country and is believed to have been established as early as 1213 b.c.e by Ati King Marikudo. The datus paid King Marikudo a golden saduk (helmet), gold necklace, coloured clothing, and small jewelleries in exchange of acquiring the Panay island ("Government of Aklan," 2019). They then established the sakup (states) of Hamtik, Akean (which includes the Capiz area), and Irong-irong, cultivated the land, and renamed the new nation as the Confederation of Madya-as (Madjaas). The datus supposedly landed in Malandog, Hamtik, where a marker commemorates the event which is reenacted in the Binirayan (literally, "place where the boats landed") Festival.

Tradition holds that the first ruler of Aklan was Datu Dinagandan who was dethroned in 1399, by Kalantiaw. In 1433, Kalantiaw III formulated a set of laws that is known today as the Code of Kalantiaw. William Henry Scott, a well-known American historian, later debunked the Code of Kalantiaw as a fraud. However, many Filipinos, including Aklanons and other Visayans continue to believe this legend as true.

The capital of Akean changed several times. Towards the end of the 14th century, Datu Dinagandan moved the capital from the present Batan, which was captured in 1399 by Chinese adventurers under Kalantiaw. Kalantiaw established then a dynasty but it prematurely ended when his successor, Kalantiaw III, was slain in a duel with Datu Manduyog, the legitimate successor to Datu Dinagandan. When Manduyog became the new ruler, he moved the capital back to Bakan (ancient name of Banga) in 1437. Several datus succeeded Manduyog and when Miguel Lopez de Legaspi landed in Batan in 1565, Datu Kabanyag was ruling Aklan from what is now the town of Libacao.

(These historical vignettes have no historical record as credible basis, but have been manufactured in such a way as to acquire a hint of historical veracity and reinforced among school children primarily through yearly programs or shows supposedly commemorating those historical events. Nonetheless, these vignettes have found no support among the established and respected historians of the Philippines, and are thus relegated as folklore of no historical provenance or significance.)

=== Spanish Era ===
During the Spanish era, Aklanons were generally peaceful and did not revolt against Spanish rule in the area. However, the situation changed when two Aklanons, Francisco del Castillo and Candido Iban, joined the Katipunan with the intention of regaining the independence of Aklan along with the rest of the Philippines. Both were successful in ridding the area of Spaniards.

=== Present ===
Currently, Aklanons enjoy some form of self-reliance since Aklan is now a province of the Philippines. Some Aklanons have also been active in Philippine politics, which includes Jose M. Hontiveros from Tangalan, Aklan became Senator representing district of Iloilo, Capiz, and Romblon from 1922 to 1928 and was appointed Justice of the Peace, Capiz, Capiz (1913-1916); Provincial Governor of Capiz (1916-1919); Auxiliary Judge, Court of First Instance (1929-1931); Judge of the Court of first Instance, 19th judicial district (1931-1933); and of the 22nd judicial district (1933-1934) and a Delegate representing 3rd District of Capiz in the July 10, 1934 Constitutional Convention. Dr. Rafael S. Tumbokon, Former Undersecretary of Health, Godofredo P. Ramos, Father of Aklan, Congressman, Governor, delegate to the 1971 Constitutional Convention and Justice of the Court of Appeals and was appointed Foreign Affairs Secretary by President Marcos replacing Carlos P. Romulo but did not materialize – he died of cancer before his appointment is approved; Incumbent Senator Risa Hontiveros, the Grand niece of Sen. Jose M. Hontiveros Alejandro Melchor, Victorino Mapa, and Cardinal Jaime Sin, who was active in the two People Power Revolutions.

Senator Jose M. Hontiveros was never mentioned among the Prominent Aklanons who has been active in politics because during his time as Senator Aklan was just the 3rd Congressional District of Capiz and so he was known to be a Capiznon. But his Birthplace is Tangalan, Aklan (CApiz) to Leon Hontiveros and Genoviva Miraflores on March 19, 1899.

Aklanons are also known throughout the Philippines due to the location of Boracay, one of the major tourist destinations in the country.

== Demographics ==
Aklanons number 559,416 in the Philippines in 2010. They are culturally close to the Karay-a and Hiligaynons. This similarity has been shown by customs, traditions, and language.

=== Languages ===
Aklanons speak the Aklan languages, which includes Aklanon and Malaynon. Ati and Kinaray-a are also spoken to some extent. Meanwhile, Hiligaynon is used as a regional language. Aklanon and Hiligaynon are spoken by Aklanons in Metro Manila, while the official languages of the Philippines, Filipino and English are taught at school.

== Culture ==
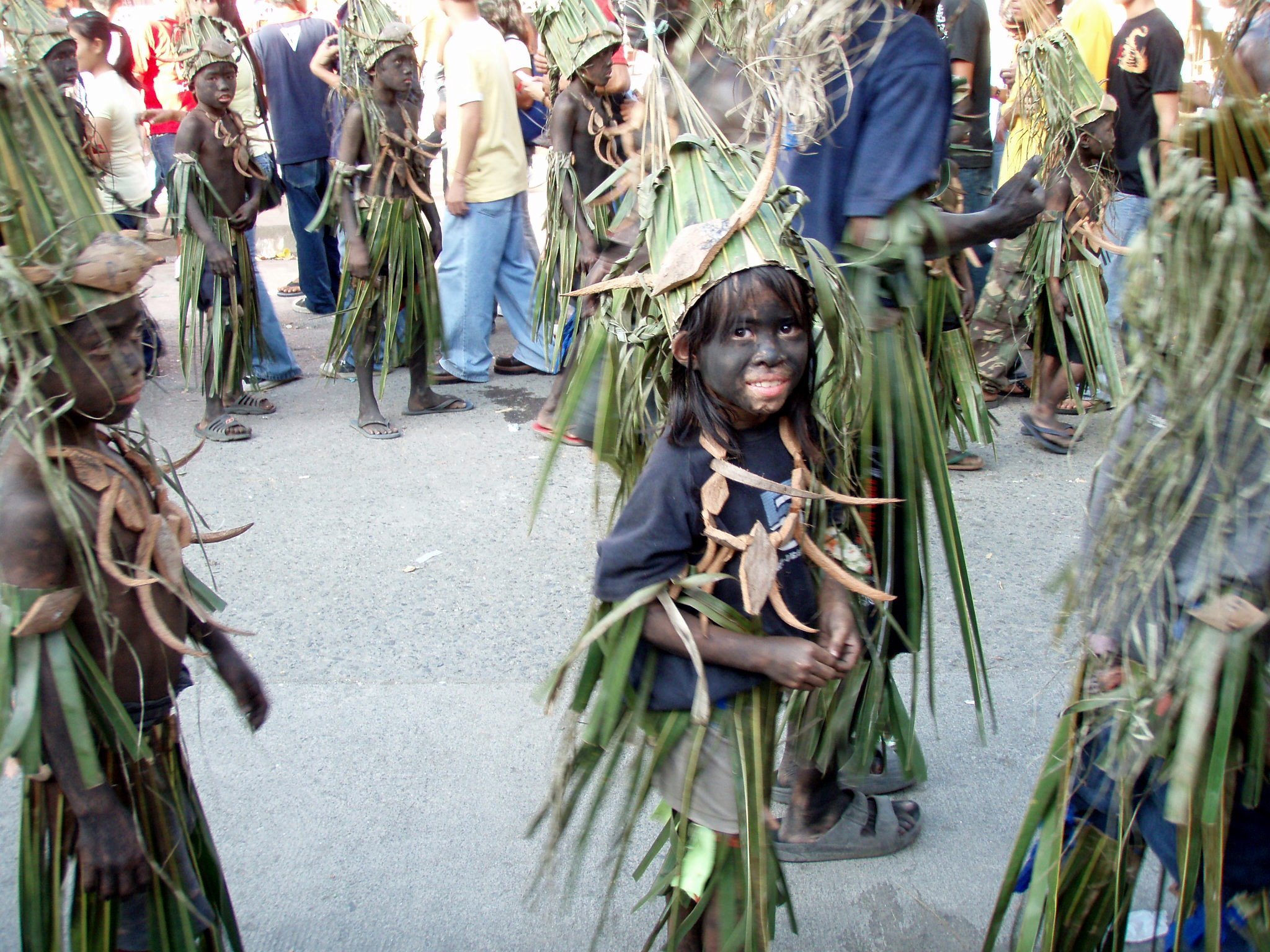
A group of dancers performing in the 2007 Ati-Atihan Festival

Most Aklanons engage in agriculture while those in the coastal areas engage in fishing. They also make handicrafts. Music, such as courtship songs or kundiman, wedding hymns, and funeral recitals, are well-developed, as it is with dance.

Historically, Aklanons practised tattooing, sometimes including henna, but abandoned the practice during the Spanish era. Recently, however, there has been a revival of it in Boracay island, which is caused primarily by its popularity with tourists.

They are among the Filipino ancestries that are tolerant to the Negritos, such as the Ati.

=== Cuisine ===
Two main dishes associated with Aklan and Aklanons are Inubaran and Binakol.

Inubaran, is a Filipino chicken stew or soup made with chicken cooked with diced banana pith, coconut milk (gata) or coconut cream (kakang gata), a souring agent, lemongrass, and various spices. The souring agent (called aeabihig) is traditionally either batuan fruits (Garcinia morella) or libas leaves (Spondias pinnata). The name means "[cooked] with ubad (banana pith)", not to be confused with ubod (palm heart); although ubod can sometimes be used as a substitute for ubad which can be difficult to acquire. Variants of the dish can also be made with other types of meat or seafood. It is a type of ginataan.

Binakol, also spelled binakoe, is a Filipino chicken soup made from chicken cooked in coconut water with grated coconut, green papaya (or chayote), leafy vegetables, garlic, onion, ginger, lemongrass, and patis (fish sauce). It can also be spiced with chilis. Binakol can also be cooked with other kinds of meat or seafood. It was traditionally cooked inside bamboo tubes or directly on halved coconut shells.

=== Literature ===
The Aklanons have a long tradition in literature with Marikudo as the most notable. Currently, many writers of Aklanon origin, including Melchor F. Cichon, have been trying to introduce Aklanon literature into the mainstream.

=== Mythology ===
The Aklanon people traditionally believe in an array of deities and spirits, as well a vast array of ancestral knowledge, that later were vilified by Spanish colonizers. In the original religious belief of the Aklanon, they believe in Gamhanan, the supreme deity and giver of life, security, and livelihood. Gamhanan is said to live with many other gods in Mount Daeogdog, where he gives life and punishes errant mortals. The supreme deity used to have a loyal deer-like pet and messenger called Panigotlo, which bleated as a sign of abundance to mortals or foretells floods and despairs to alert the people. Other Aklanon deities include Bululakaw, who lived in the island's sacred mountain called Madya-as, Laon, a chief goddess, and the mediator deities, namely, Bangutbanwa, deity who is prayed to for a good harvests and an orderly universe, Mangindalon, the deity who intercedes for sick persons and punishes enemies, Soliran, the deity performs marriage ceremonies, Solian the deity performs marriage ceremonies, and Manunubo, the good spirit of the sea.

Another known personality in traditional Aklanon beliefs is Damhanan, the hunter who killed Panigotlo, the sacred deer-like pet of Gamhanan. The mango tree is also important to the Aklanon. They have a traditional narrative on its origin. According to ancestral stories, Daeogdog, a man with violent temper whose name means, is married Mabuot, a woman who was kind and gentle. Daegdog wanted to marry his daughter Agahon to Maeopig, a man with uncontrollable anger. Mabuot, who loved her daughter, tried to prevent the marriage. Agahon rejected the marriage proposal, but her father still pushed for it, leading Agahon to kill herself before the marriage. From her burial, it is said that the first mango tree sprouted from

The Aklanon also believe in many folkloric beings, including the aswang.

== See also ==
- Aklanon language
- Aklan
- Visayan people
  - Boholano people
  - Capiznon people
  - Cebuano people
  - Cuyunon people
  - Eskaya people
  - Hiligaynon people
  - Karay-a people
  - Masbateño people
  - Porohanon people
  - Romblomanon people
  - Suludnon
  - Waray people
- Visayan languages
