= Waray people =

Ethnic group in the Philippines

Waray people Waray-Waray
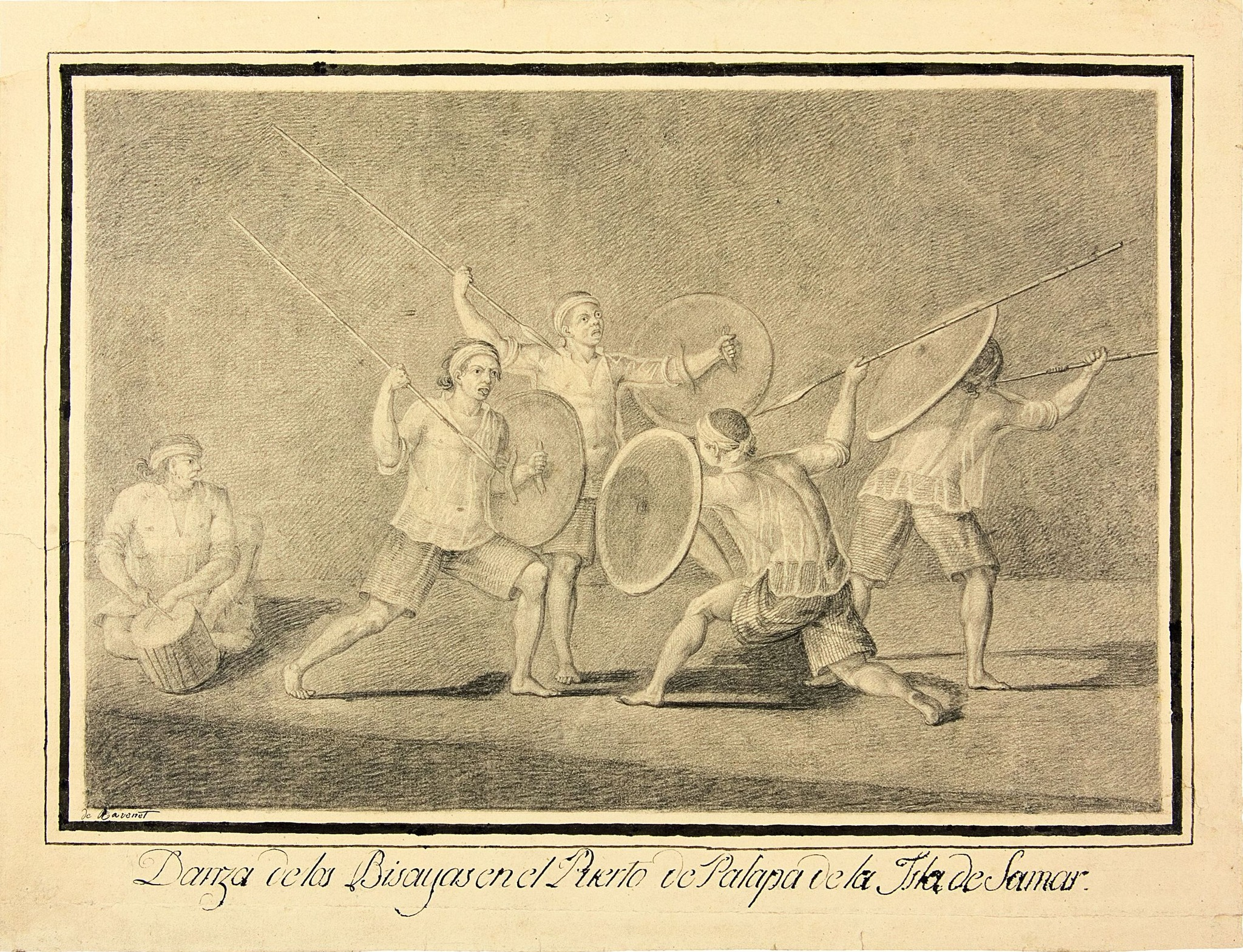
- Waray people War dance 1792

Total population
- 4,106,539 (2020) (3.8% of the Philippine population)

Regions with significant populations
- Philippines (Eastern Visayas, eastern parts of Masbate, Caraga, Sorsogon, and Metro Manila) Significant diaspora in: United States; Canada; Australia; United Kingdom; New Zealand; Ireland; Singapore United Arab Emirates

Languages
- Native; Waray; Also; Cebuano • Filipino • English

Religion
- Predominantly; Christianity (majority Roman Catholicism • minority Aglipayan , Protestantism)

Related ethnic groups
- Other Visayan peoples; (Hiligaynon; Boholano; Cebuano; Masbateño; Butuanon; Aklanon; Surigaonon; Capiznon; Cuyonon; Ratagnon; Karay-a; Romblomanon; Suludnon); Other Austronesian peoples

The Waray people (or the Waray-Waray people) are a subgroup of the larger Visayan ethnolinguistic group, who constitute the 4th largest Filipino ethnolinguistic group in the Philippines. Their primary language is the Waray language (also called Lineyte-Samarnon), an Austronesian language native to the islands of Samar, Leyte and Biliran, which together comprise the Eastern Visayas Region of the Philippines. Waray people inhabit most of Samar where they are called Samareños/Samarnons, the northern part of the island of Leyte where they are called Leyteños, and the island of Biliran. In Leyte island, the Waray-speaking people are separated from the Cebuano-speaking Leyteños by the island's mountain range at the middle.

In the island-province of Biliran, Waray-speaking people live in the eastern part facing Samar island, and Maripipi Island; their Waray dialect is commonly referred to as Biliranon. In Ticao island, belonging to Masbate province, Bicol Region, Waray-speaking people dwell in most of the island; who are commonly referred to as Ticaonon. Though Ticaonons identify more with the Masbateño-speaking people of Masbate, being their province-mates. The Bicolano language has more common vocabulary with the Waray language than with other Visayan languages (i.e. Cebuano or Ilonggo).

== History ==
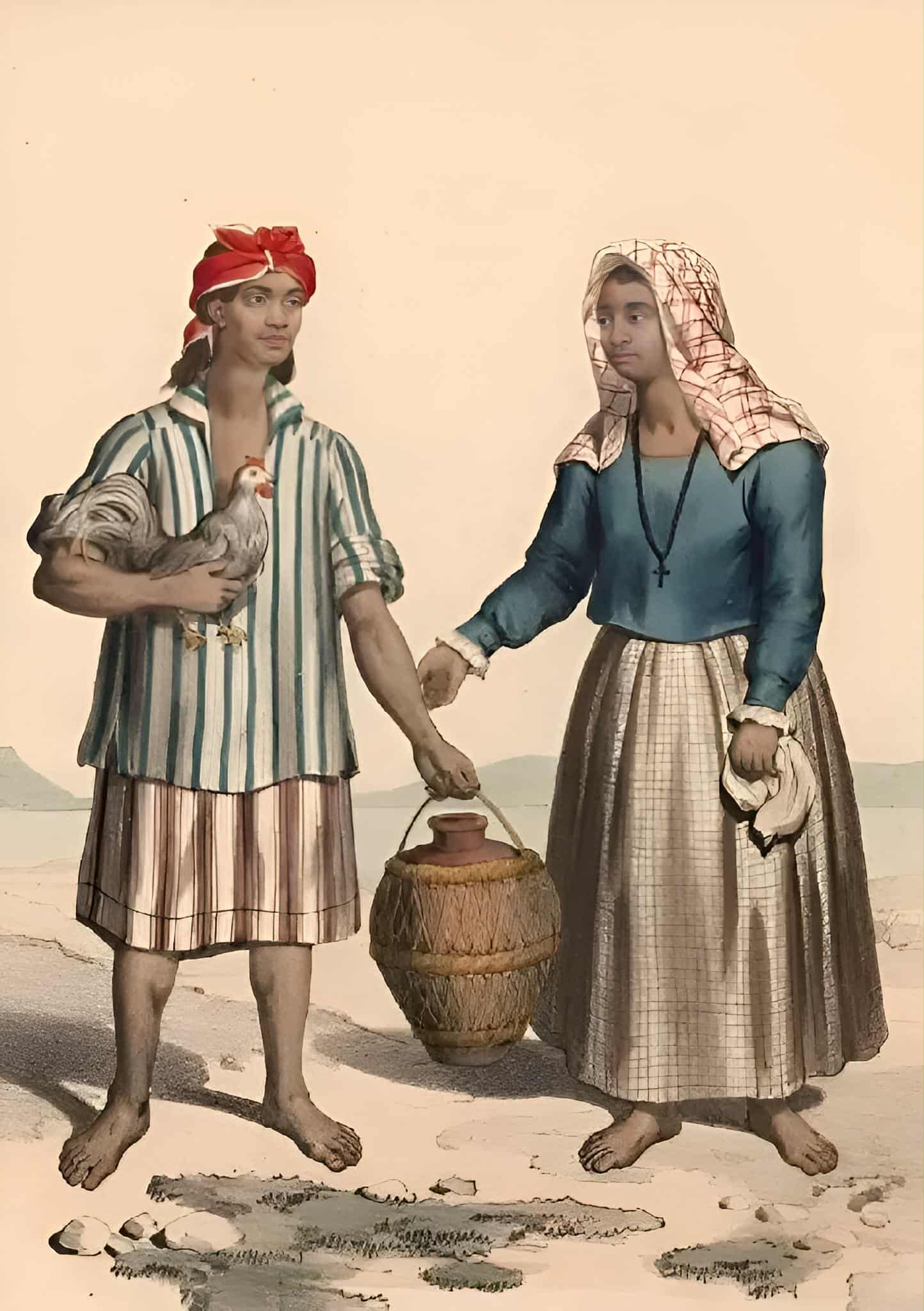
Locals of Samar by Jean Mallat 1800's

According to historian and Filipinologist William Henry Scott, evidence of the first humans in the Eastern Visayas region can be found at Sohoton Caves in Basey, Samar, dating around 8,550 BC. Flake tools made of stone were found in the caves along the Basey River as proof of human existence during those times. These tools were used by hunter-gatherers until the 13th century.

The Waray people descend from Austronesian-speaking seafarers who settled the Philippine archipelago starting in the Iron Age. Before the Spaniards came in the region, the Warays already had complex cultural and socio-political systems, and trading with the Chinese, Borneans and Malays. In 1521, the Warays of the east coast of Samar, who called themselves Ibabaonon, were the first people from the Philippine islands that were seen by the Europeans in the expedition led by Portuguese explorer Ferdinand Magellan. According to Magellan's documenter, Antonio Pigafetta, they first came across with this native group at sea close to Suluan Island.

In 1595, Jesuit missionaries first arrived in Leyte. Within a decade they had evangelized much of the local population, during this period, many converts relocated from dispersed settlements into mission villages. The terms Cristiano, Pintado and Bisaya were originally applied by the Spanish to refer to the people of Leyte and Samar. Over time, these terms were adopted by the local inhabitants and came to acquire their own meanings and associations. Alongside Christianity, the Waray people still retain pre-colonial traditions and rituals.

Due to the creation of the Philippine State and the Tagalogization of the Visayas islands. Attempts to “Filipinize” Warays and other Bisayan ethnicities into assimilating into the Philippine State. The Waray language of Waray-Waray is not nationally considered a language in the Philippines but a dialect except in the islands of Samar and Leyte.

=== "Waray Waray" and Eartha Kitt ===
The folk song, “Waray Waray” came to international attention in the 1960s when the American entertainer, Eartha Kitt, performed and recorded her own version of the song. Kitt sings the song in a mix of Tagalog and Visayan with some English interludes. Eartha Kitt's version of "Waray-Waray" differs significantly from her songs in other languages like French and Spanish. Her rendition is marked by noticeable mispronunciations, misplaced emphasis on certain words, and the inclusion of a few invented words. This rough delivery contrasts with the smoother performances she typically provides in other non-English songs.

The folk song "Waray-Waray" was composed by Juan Silos, Jr., with lyrics by Levi Celerio. It centers on Waray women and perpetuates stereotypes about them. Lyrics such as "Waray women will never flee, even in the face of death" and "But Waray women are different, we do not fear anyone" reinforce the portrayal of Waray people as strong and combative. The song depicts Waray women as tough, thuggish, and grumpy. Eartha Kitt performed "Waray-Waray" internationally, including in the Philippines, where it became part of the broader discourse on Filipina identity.

== Stereotypes ==
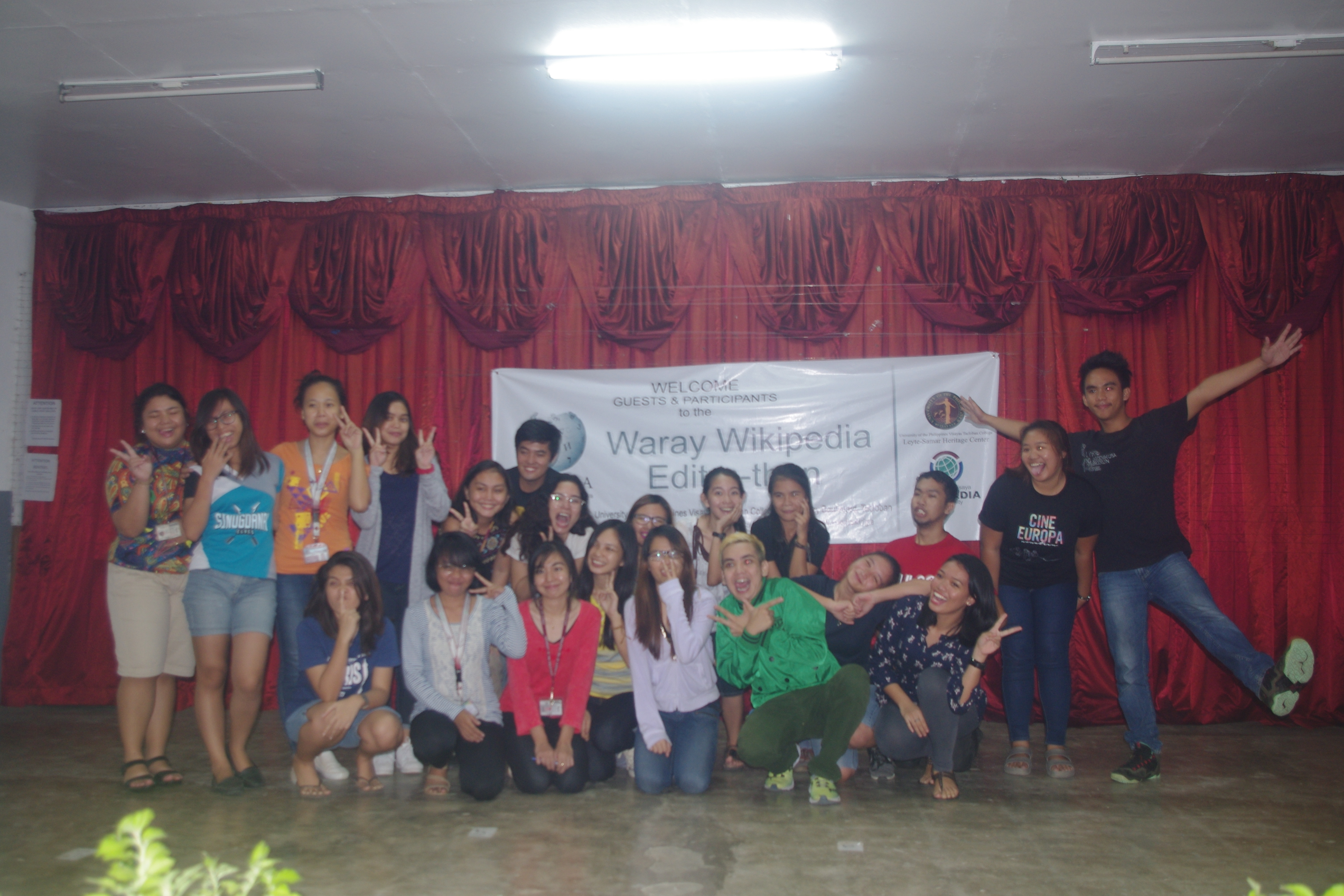
Waray students at a Wikipedia edit-a-thon in the University of the Philippines Visayas Tacloban College (2016)

=== Martial Culture ===
The Waray-Waray are often stereotyped as brave warriors, as in the popular phrase, Basta ang Waray, hindi uurong sa away, meaning "The Waray would never back down from a fight". Most of the negative connotation of this stereotype however, which depicted Warays as violent and callous, were caused by the notorious Waray-Waray gangs.

The ongoing New People Army Rebellion's main stronghold is held within Northern Samar, due to the region's history of resistance against colonialism and its strong cultural ties to their former warrior culture in their pre-colonial days as many NPA fighters are predominantly of Waray & Cebuano descent.

=== Contentment Culture ===
They are also known as contented people, so much so that, during the Spanish era, they were often called lazy, for being contented to live in simplicity as farmers, and for making tuba palm wine from coconut nectar. Warays are also known for their love of music, in particular the Kuratsa, a courtship dance.

== Culture and traditions ==
=== Language ===
The Waray people speak Waray, a major Visayan language. Many also speak English, Tagalog, Bicolano and/or Cebuano as their second languages. Some people of Waray descent speak Waray as their second or third language, especially among emigrants to Metro Manila, other parts of the Philippines (especially in Mindanao), and elsewhere in the world.

The term Waray means "nothing" in the Waray language. It is unclear how it became the language's name. According to the Sanghiran sang Binisaya (Council for the Visayan Language), the formal name of the language is Lineyte-Samarnon or Binisaya. Although, the colloquial term "Waray" eventually became the official term.

Waray is predominantly spoken on Samar Island with Cebuano spoken in some areas of the island. Each province in Samar Island has a distinct variant of Waray that can be distinguished by its vocabulary, tone, and accent variations. Each variant has its own name; estehanon refers to Eastern Samar Waray, nortehanon refers to Northern Samar Waray, and westehanon (also called Kinalbayog/Calbayognon) refers to (Western) Samar Waray. Warays who live in these provinces may also be identified with those names.

=== Traditions ===
Many Waray traditions can be traced to pre-colonial times. For example, Waray-Waray Cha-Cha from the Old Spanish Cabecera, the Kuratsa Dance, or Kuratsa de Mayor is a very popular traditional dance of the Waray-Waray at many social gatherings, especially weddings. It is very common throughout Samar. Initially thought to have originated from the la cucaracha (cockroach dance) of Mexico, it was later confirmed by the National Commission for Culture and the Arts that the dance was indeed Waray in origin, not Mexican. The dance depicts a courtship dance which exemplifies the movements of the rooster and the hen, which were prized commodities for the Waray people. Traditionally, the dance is played together with a rondalla or a live string band. The music used for the dance is complex, having a wide variety depending on the wishes of the musicians. In some cases, the rondalla also sings while the performers dance to the music.

In Waray tradition, a sarayaw or social dancing event is never complete without the kuratsa. The dance is so integral to Waray culture that it is also exhibited in birthdays, weddings, baptisms, and even political and sports events. Traditionally, the dance area for the dancers are leveled, and not elevated, so that the spectators may surround them, whether the location is indoor or outdoor. To begin the dance, the parag-adu (the person who pairs the dancers) calls out the dancers first. The pairs then proceed to the paseo. The first dance move begins with the siki-siki (foot steps) or the tinikud-tikud (heel steps). Both of which are extremely rapid steps that keep both foot near each other. The couple who dances the Kuratsa are showered with money by the people around them. Both dancers afterwards wave their arms sideways or a little overhead, arms together or in alteration. Afterwards, the men will perform the sarakiki step, a rapid vibrating step performance that depicts the agility of the rooster.

It includes mincing, skipping, hopping, and jumping combinations. Despite being brisque and rapid, the men are expected to execute the steps in a graceful manner where they seem to glide in space. For the women, they are expected to perform that languorous and wavy mabalud-balud steps. The basic format of the women's steps is based on a sub-step known as duon, which means 'to put weight on'. The usage of the duon makes the dancers of the mabalud-balud bounce with grace, if properly done. The best dancers of the mabalu-balud should be light, fluid, and fine in execution. As partners, the pairs should be synchronized with the moves that are designated as dual in nature. The pair dramatize the romantic palanat, a chasing pair step. The palanat depicts the man as chasing the women in pursue of love. The women are seen to reject the man initially, as to test if the man is serious in his pursuit. Once the man is rejected, it is expected for the man to turn back in grief, while the women will follow the man as if looking if the man is really in grief, all while executing the palanat. Once the grief has been proven, the dance proceeds to the dagit (swoop down steps) and wali (lift steps). The man afterwards will kneel and roll around while the woman manifests her prestige with poise as she sways and circles towards her partner. To make it more elaborate, there is also a gapus-gapusay or tying steps.

In gapus-gapusay, the dancers are tied with kerchief at separate times. The tied partner is only released once the free partner immobilizes the sabwag, or dropping money on the scarf laid at the center of the ground. The sabwag notably depicts the dowry. Afterwards, both partners woo each other through steps that differentiate the man and the woman. The man uses the parayaw (showing off steps), while the woman uses the flirtatious lubay-lubay (hip sway steps). The dance traditionally ends with all dancers expected to exhibit finesse in the art form. The kuratsa is notably used in the Waray wedding ritual known as bakayaw. The bride and the groom are expected to dance the kuratsa, followed by the ninang and ninong (the principal sponsors of the marriage). During a bakayaw, people are mandated by tradition to throw money towards the dancing bride and groom. The thrown money is known as gala, and is collected and offered by the groom to the bride as the precursor of a married life. The friends and family of the couple usually throws a lot of money towards the couple as the Warays believe that the more money showered upon them, the more blessings shall arrive for the couple. In 2011, the performing art was cited by the National Commission for Culture and the Arts as one of the intangible cultural heritage of the Philippines under the performing arts category that the government may nominate in the UNESCO Intangible Cultural Heritage Lists.

== Education ==
Tacloban City in Leyte is home to a campus of the University of the Philippines Tacloban, Leyte Colleges, and Leyte Normal University. There are numerous state universities serving the region, including Eastern Samar State University, Eastern Visayas State University, Samar State University and the largest both in terms of land area and curricular offerings in the whole region, the University of Eastern Philippines located in Catarman, Northern Samar. There are also other colleges in (Western) Samar like St. Mary's College of Catbalogan, formerly Sacred Heart College and Samar College. Northwest Samar State University, formerly Tiburcio Tancinco Memorial Institute of Science and Technology and Samar State College of Agriculture and Forestry, offer courses that are needed in technology and business community.

== Livelihood ==
=== Crops ===
The most important crop and major source of income for many is the coconut. Other major agricultural products include rice and corn, while sugarcane, abaca, and tobacco are also grown. Cassava and camote (sweet potato) are grown as supplementary staple crops. Pineapple, banana, mangoes, and other fruit are grown year round, as are many vegetables and peanuts. A root crop known as palawan is also widely known in Samar and Leyte. Leyte is a big producer of bananas.

=== Farming and fishing ===
Farming and fishing provide much of the livelihood of the Waray-Waray. There is an impressive variety of seafood available.

Native wines are produced in the area, as in many places in the Philippines. The most common of these wines are tuba extracted from the coconut palm, "manyang" extracted from palm tree (common in the province of Northern Samar) and pangasi, made from fermented rice.

== Demographics ==
The Waray people form the majority of the population in the provinces of Eastern Samar, Northern Samar, and Samar while they form a significant population in Leyte, Southern Leyte, Biliran, and Sorsogon, as well as few parts of Mindanao. According to the Philippine census of 2010, the Waray population is 3,660,645. Encyclopædia Britannica estimates that the Waray people's population reached 4.2 million in early 21st century. Although, an updated 2020 Philippine census reveals that Warays only constitute around 4.1 million only, about 100,000 short of the Encyclopædia Britannica estimate.

== Notable Warays ==
- Francisco Alvarado - Waray language poet and playwright (Palo)
- Norberto Romualdez - former Supreme Court associate justice.
- Benjamin Romualdez - former governor of Leyte from 1967 to 1986 and Philippine ambassador to United States
- Jericho Petilla - current governor of Leyte
- Nieves Fernandez - Filipino guerrilla in WW2

== See also ==
- Tagalog people
- Kapampangan people
- Ilocano people
- Igorot people
- Pangasinan people
- Bicolano people
- Negrito
- Lowland Christian Filipinos
- Visayans
  - Aklanon people
  - Boholano people
  - Capiznon people
  - Cebuano people
  - Cuyunon people
  - Hiligaynon people
  - Karay-a people
  - Masbateño people
  - Porohanon people
  - Romblomanon people
  - Suludnon
- Lumad
- Moro people
