= Sulod language =

Austronesian language spoken in Philippines

Sulod
- Native to: Philippines
- Region: Panay
- Native speakers: (14,000 cited 1980)
- Language family: Austronesian: Malayo-Polynesian; Philippine; Central Philippine; Visayan; Western Visayan; Sulod

Language codes
- ISO 639-3: srg
- Glottolog: sulo1237

Sulod, also known as Ligbok, is a Central Philippine language of the Suludnon indigenous people who reside in the mountain area of central Panay in the Philippines. It is closely related to the Karay-a language.

Sulod is spoken in the clustered sitios of Buri, Maranat, Siya, and Takayan along the banks of the Panay River, between Mt. Kudkuran and Mt. Baloy in central Panay.

Below are verses from the first two stanzas of the second part of "Sugidanun I" ('First Narration') of the Sulodnon epic Hinilawod chanted by Hugan-an and recorded by Dr. F. Landa Jocano. The epic is in the original Sulodnon language.

"Sugidanun I": Pangayaw – 2. Himos

Yabon-yabon pay tun-og
Alimbu pa duyamig
Nagparibung domdom
Hangop abi sa domdom.
Ni Buyong Humadapnon:
"Ti, Taghuy, ku magsalakay
Abi ako magmamkaw
Ku magliali ako sa lawdon
Maglibot sa layagon
Bungayong ako sa sarakyan
Waay ako't panimbang,
Waay it panibin-sibin."

Mahinay tumindug
Mahinay tumimbayug
'I ginuong harangdon.
Kambay dato agtunan
Lubayon kamasuswon
Uwa si Labing Anyag
Sanglit may babaylan
Sanglit hay singday.

Translation:

The dew was still fresh
The morning breeze was cold
There he sat wondering
'Till an idea came to his mind.
Said Buyong Humadapnon:
"Well, Taghuy, were I to travel
Supposing I do embark
If I scour and cross the seas
Travel around, spread my sails
I would be alone in my vessel
I have no assistant
I have no companion."

And slowly he stood
Meditating he took to his feet
The respected master.
He went and approached
His younger sister
Uwa Labing Anyag
Because she was a babaylan.
And skilled in charms.

—F. Landa Jocano

== See also ==
- Hinilawod
