= Masbateño people =

Visayan ethnic group

The Masbateño people refers to the people who lived in the Masbate province of the Philippines, which is part of the Bicol Region. They are part of the wider Visayan ethnolinguistic group, who constitute the largest Filipino ethnolinguistic group.

== Demographics ==
The Masbateño 677,942 in 2010. They are the descendants of the Austronesian-immigrants who came from South China during the Iron Age who probably came to Masbate after reaching the more southern Visayan islands. Masbateños may be considered Visayans by language but are Bicolanos by region. They speak the Masbateño language, a Visayan language and almost all practice Roman Catholicism.

== Culture ==
Most of the people of Masbate speak Masbateño a language that is closely related to Hiligaynon and Capiznon. However, in various municipalities of the island, various other languages are spoken. In the vicinity of the towns of Cataingan, Palanas and Dimasalang, most residents speak Waray-Waray. In Pio Corpuz the people speak Cebuano while in Placer and in the west coast along coast of Mandaon, Hiligaynon (Ilonggo) and Capiznon are spoken. Bicolano is also spoken by the residents.

The province of Masbate is known as cattle country. The cattle breed found on the island was taken from herds in India that have flourished in the benign climate of the island. The province is the second largest supplier of cattle that is brought to Manila for slaughter. This industry has inspired the establishment of a 'Rodeo Filipino' on the third week of June. This festival features a week-long tournament of bull riding, cattle wrestling, lassoing, calf casting, post driving, carabao racing and a host of other ‘rodeo’ games. This unique observance is also accompanied by cattle raising contests, a trade fair and parades, much like the rodeos in the American West.

== See also ==
- Visayans
  - Aklanon people
  - Boholano people
  - Capiznon people
  - Cebuano people
  - Cuyunon people
  - Hiligaynon people
  - Karay-a people
  - Porohanon people
  - Romblomanon people
  - Suludnon
  - Waray people
