= Aklanon language =

Bisayan language spoken in the Philippines

Aklanon
- Akean
- Akeanon; Inakeanon
- Native to: Philippines
- Region: Aklan, northwestern Capiz, northern Antique, and southern Romblon
- Ethnicity: Aklanon
- Native speakers: 560,000 (2010)
- Language family: Austronesian: Malayo-Polynesian; Philippine; Central Philippine; Bisayan; Western Bisayan; Aklanon
- Dialects: Malaynon
- Writing system: Latin; Historically Baybayin

Official status
- Official language in: Regional language in the Philippines
- Regulated by: Komisyon sa Wikang Filipino

Language codes
- ISO 639-3: akl – Aklanon
- Glottolog: akla1240 Aklanon
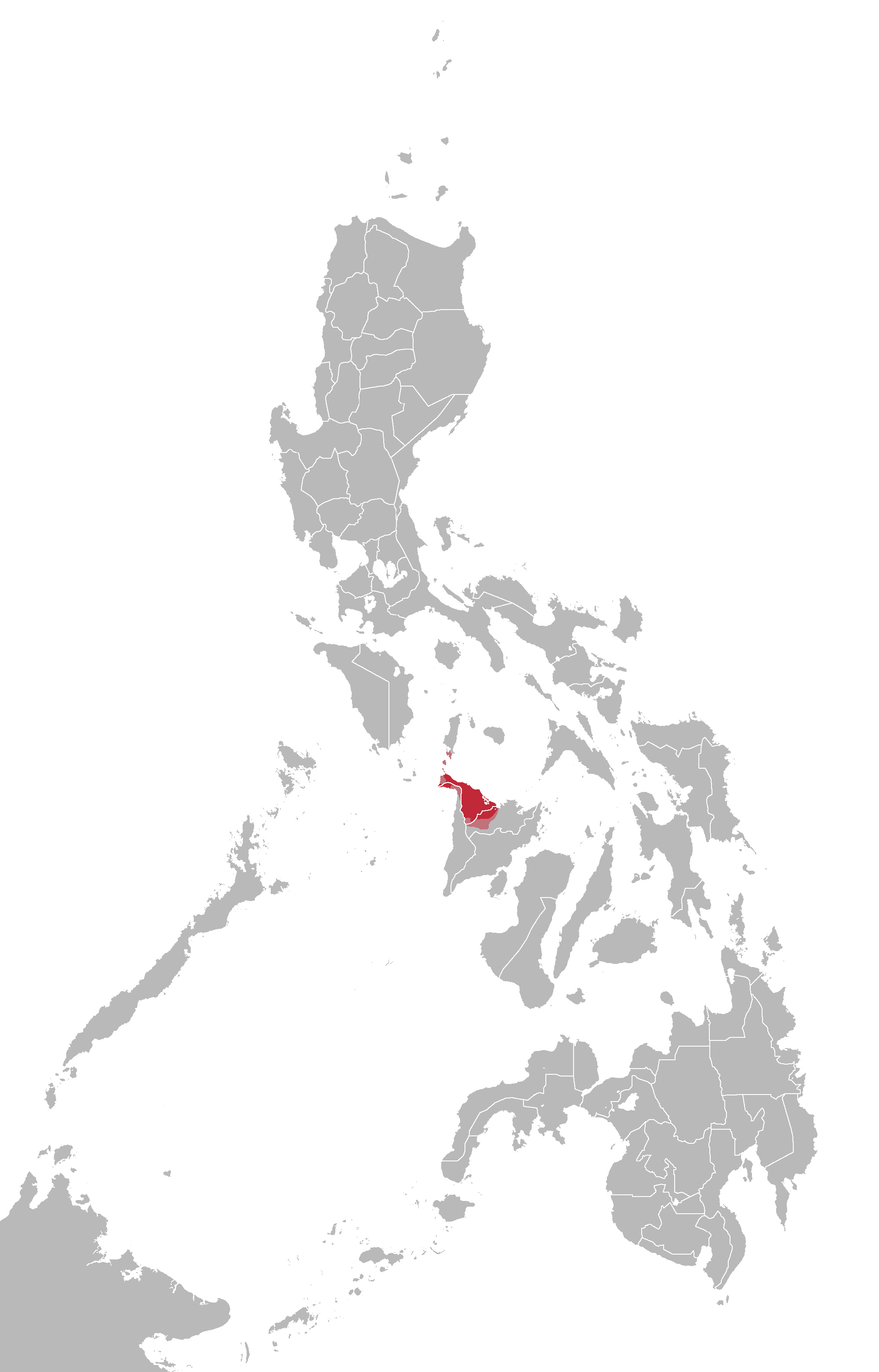
- Area where Aklanon is spoken

Aklanon, also known as Akeanon or Inakeanon, is an Austronesian language of the Bisayan subgroup spoken by the Aklanon people, the locals of the province of Aklan on the island of Panay in the Philippines. Its unique feature among other Bisayan languages is the close-mid back unrounded vowel [ɤ] occurring as part of diphthongs and traditionally written with the letter ⟨Ee⟩ such as in the autonyms Akean and Akeanon. However, this phoneme is also present in other but geographically scattered and distant Philippine languages, namely Itbayat, Isneg, Manobo, Samal and Kankanaey.

The Malaynon dialect is 93% lexically similar to Aklanon and has retained the "l" sounds, which elsewhere are often pronounced as "r".

== Phonology ==
Aklanon has 21 phonemes. There are 17 consonants: p, t, k, b, d, g, m, n, ng, s, h, l, r, w, y, the glottal stop ʔ, and the voiced velar fricative ɣ. There are six vowels: the three native vowels i, a, and u, which are typical for a Bisayan vowel inventory, the additional e and o for loanwords and common nouns, and a distinct phoneme argued by Zorc (2005) to be a close-mid back unrounded vowel [ɤ]. The voiced velar fricative /ɣ/ was also analyzed by Rentillo and Pototanon (2022) as having a voiced velar approximant [ɰ] as an allophone.

=== Vowels ===
Table of vowel phonemes of Aklanon
	Front	Central	Back	
	Front	Central	Unrounded	Rounded
Close	i			u
Mid	ɛ		ɤ	o
Open		a ~ ɐ		

=== Consonants ===
	Labial	Dental	Alveolar	Palato- alveolar	Palatal	Velar	Glottal
Nasal	m		n			ŋ	
Stop	p b	t d				k g	ʔ
Affricate			(t͡s) (d͡z)	(t͡ʃ) (d͡ʒ)			
Fricative	(f) (v)		s (z)	(ʃ)		ɣ	h
Approximant	w		l		j	(ɰ)	
Flap			ɾ ~ r				

/t͡ʃ, d͡ʒ/ from loanwords can also be heard as palatal stops [c, ɟ]. /l/ can also be heard as [ɫ] and can also alternate with [d].

== Common phrases ==
Akeanon	Malaynon	English
Hay	Hay	Hi/Hello
Mayad-ayad nga agahon	Mayad nga agahon	Good morning
Mayad-ayad nga hapon	Mayad nga hapon	Good afternoon
Mayad-ayad nga gabi-i	Mayad nga gabi-i	Good night
Mayad-ayad nga adlaw	Mayad nga adlaw	Good day
Saeamat	Salamat	Thanks
Mayad man	Mayad man	I am fine
Pangabay	Pangabay	Please
Hu-o	Hu-o	Yes
Bukon/ayaw/indi	Bukon/indi	No
Owa	Owa	None
Paalin?	Paiwan?	How?
Hin-uno?	San-o?	When?
Siin	Diin	Where?
Sin-o	Sin-o	Who?
Ano?	Iwan?	What?
Alin?	Diin?	Which?
Ham-an?	Basi?	Why?
Kamusta ka eon?	Kamusta kaw eon?	How are you?
Ano ing pangaean?	Ano imong ngaean?	What is your name?
Siin ka gaadto?	Diin 'kaw maayan?	Where are you going?
Hin-uno ka gapanaw?	San-o 'kaw mapanaw?	When are you leaving?
Anong oras eon?	Anong oras eon?	What time is it?
Tig-pila ea?	Tag-pila dya?	How much is this?
Man-o ra?/Pila daya?/Pila raya?	Pila dya?	What is the price? (monetary)
Bak-eon ko raya	Bakeon ko dya	I will buy this
Kagwapa ka gid-ing	Inay nga gwapa guid imo	You are beautiful
Kagwapo ka gid-ing	Inay nga gwapo guid imo	You are handsome
Kabuot ka gid-ing	Kabuoton guid imo	You are kind
Maalam ka gid-ing	Inay nga aeam guid imo	You are smart
Ta eon	Mus ta	Let's go
Dalia/Bakasa/Dasiga	Dasiga	Hurry up
Balik eon kita	Balik 'ta eon	Let's go back
Uwa tang kaeobot	Uwa takon kaeubot	I do not understand
Owa tang kasayud	Uwa takon kasayud	I do not know
Gusto ko ro maeamig nga tubi	Ila akon it tubi nga eamig	I'd like cold water
Gutom eon ako	Gutom akon	I am hungry
Taeon ma kaon	Kaon taeon	Let's eat
Kanami eo pagkaon	Sadya ang pagkaon	The food is delicious
Owa ako't kwarta	Uwa akon it kuarta	I have no money
Kaumangon kat ing	Umang kat imo	You are crazy
Gahinibayag ka gid-ing	Gakadlaw kat imo	You are laughing
Magamit ko it banyo	Pagamit bi ko it kasilyas	I need to use the toilet
Mapanaw eon kita	Panaw ta eon	We are going
Si-in dapit ing baeay?	Diin imong baeay?	Where is your house located?
Si-in ka gatinir?	Diin imo gauli?	Where are you staying?
Mag dahan ka	Andam imo	Take care

=== Philippine national proverb ===
Here is the Philippine national proverb in various languages.

- Tagalog: Ang hindi marunong lumingon sa pinanggalingan ay hindi makararating sa paroroonan.
- Akeanon: Ro uwa' gatan-aw sa anang ginhalinan hay indi makaabut sa anang ginapaeangpan.
- Malaynon: Ang indi kausoy magbalikid sa anang hinalinan hay indi makaabut sa anang paayanan.
- Kinaray-a: Ang indi kamaan magbalikid sa ginhalinan, indi makaabot sa paraagtunan.
- English: He who does not look back where he came from, will never reach his destination.

=== Numbers ===
Number	Akeanon/Malaynon	Hiligaynon	Tagalog	English
1	Isaea/Isya (Malaynon)	Isá	Isa	One
2	Daywa	Duhá	Dalawa	Two
3	Tatlo	Tátlo	Tatlo	Three
4	Ap-at	Ápat	Apat	Four
5	Li-má	Limá	Lima	Five
6	An-om	Ánum	Anim	Six
7	Pitó	Pitó	Pito	Seven
8	Waeo	Waló	Walo	Eight
9	Siyám	Siyám	Siyam	Nine
10	Púeo	Pulò/Napulò	Sampu	Ten

=== Literature ===
Note: All these poems were written by Melchor F. Cichon, an Aklanon poet.

- "Ambeth". Philippine Panorama, August 14, 1994.
- "Emergency Room". The Aklan Reporter, December 7, 1994, p. 10
- "Eva, Si Adan!" (Finalist Sa Unang Premyo Openiano A. Italia Competition, January 1993, Duenas, Iloilo)
- "Ham-at Madueom Ro Gabii Inay?" Philippine Panorama, March 27, 1994, p. 29. (First Aklanon poem published in the Philippine Panorama), also in The Aklan Reporter, April 6, 1994, p. 8.
- "Hin-uno Pa". The Aklan Reporter, February 23, 1994, p. 8. Also in Ani December 1993, p. 44
- "Inay". Philippine Collegian, October 4, 1973, p. 3 (First Aklanon poem in the Philippine Collegian)
- "Limog sa Idaeom". Ani December 1993, p. 48
- "Mamunit Ako Inay". The Aklan Reporter, December 28, 1994, p. 10
- "Manog-Uling". The Aklan Reporter July 29, 1992, p. 9. Also in Ani December 1993, p. 50
- "Owa't Kaso", Saeamat. Mantala 3:97 2000
- "Ro Bantay". The Aklan Reporter, September 6, 1995, p. 7
- "Competition", March 13, 1998, UPV Auditorium, Iloilo City
- "Sa Pilapil It Tangke". Ani December 1994, p. 46
- "Toto, Pumailaya Ka". Pagbutlak (First Aklanon in Pagbutlak)
- "Welga". Mantala 3:99 2000
