= Ratagnon people =

Ratagnon (also transliterated Datagnon or Latagnon) is one of the eight indigenous groups of Mangyan in the southernmost tip of Occidental Mindoro and the Mindoro Islands along the Sulu Sea, in the Philippines. The Ratagnon live in the southernmost part of the municipality of Magsaysay in Occidental Mindoro. Their language is similar to the Visayan Cuyunon language, spoken by the inhabitants of Cuyo Island in Northern Palawan.

The Ratagnon women wear a wrap-around cotton cloth from the waistline to the knees and some of the males still wear the traditional loincloth. The women's breast covering is made of woven nito (vine). They also wear accessories made of beads and copper wire. The males wear a jacket with simple embroidery during gala festivities and carry flint, tinder, and other paraphernalia for making fire. Both sexes wear coils of red-dyed rattan at the waistline. Like many of their native Mangyan neighbors, they also carry betel chew and its ingredients in bamboo containers. Today only around 310 people speak the Ratagnon language, which is nearly extinct, out of an ethnic population of 2,000 people.

== See also ==
- Ratagnon language
