= Romblomanon people =

The Romblomanon people are the indigenous inhabitants of Romblon province. They are part of the Visayan metaethnicity.

== Area ==
Romblomanons live mainly in the province of Romblon. However, due to population increase, which the island province's small area couldn't sustain, there are also significant numbers of Romblomanons in Occidental Mindoro, Oriental Mindoro, Masbate, Aklan, Palawan, Capiz, and possibly parts of Luzon and Mindanao.

== Demographics ==
Romblomanons number 157,398 in 2010, and are considered as Visayans. Romblomanons speak one of three languages, the Romblomanon language, Asi language, and the Onhan language. Due to proximity of Capiz and Aklan, most Romblomanons can speak Hiligaynon. Most are Roman Catholics.
