= Central Panay Mountain Range =

Mountain range in Panay, Philippines

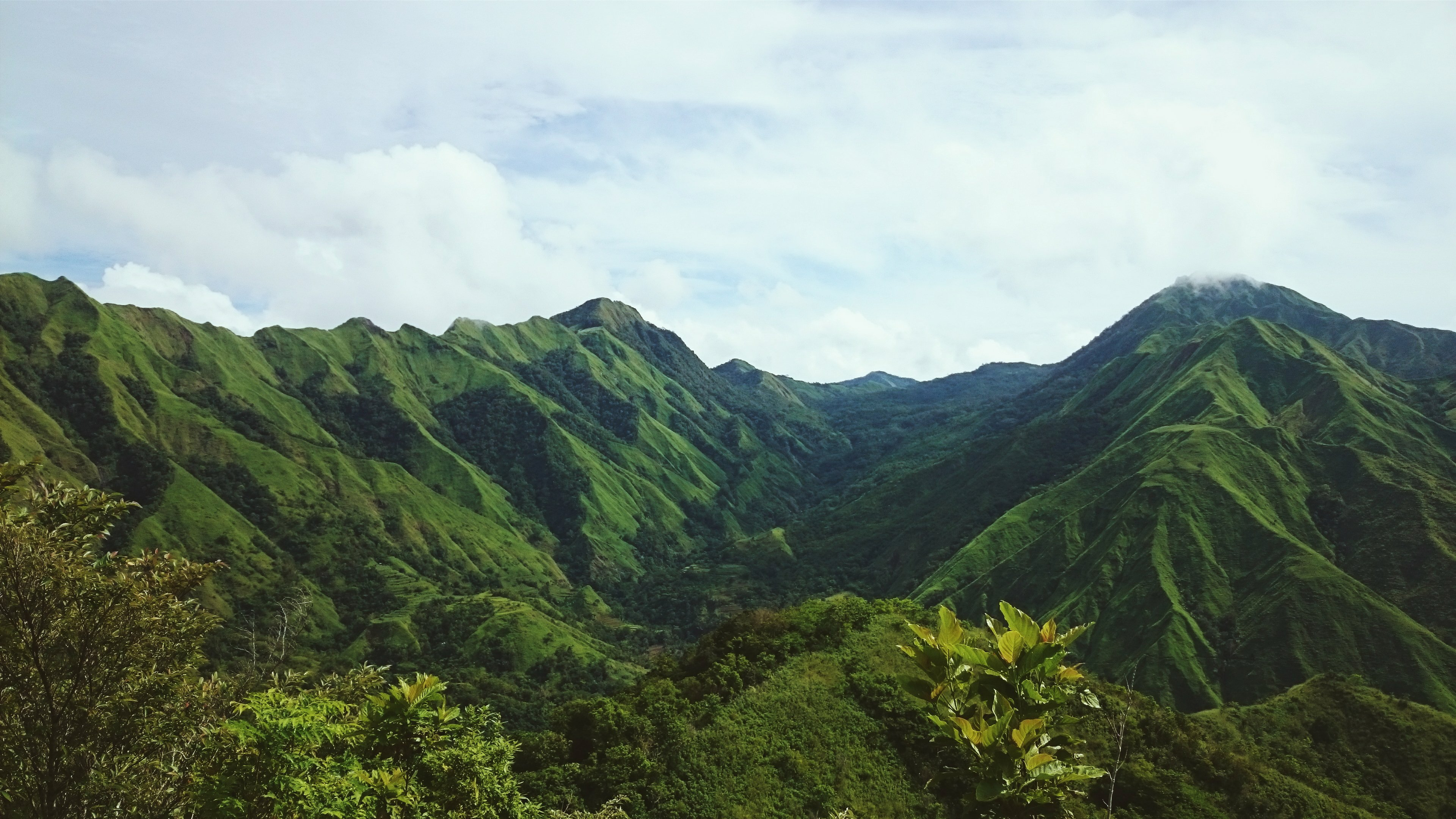
- Close-up view of the range as seen from Mount Napulak in Igbaras, Iloilo

Highest point
- Peak: Mount Madja-as
- Elevation: 2,117 m (6,946 ft)

Dimensions
- Length: 170 km (110 mi) north-south
- Width: 34 km (21 mi) east-west
- Area: 1,056 km^{2} (408 mi^{2})

Geography
- Location within Philippines Location within Visayas
- Country: Philippines
- Province: Aklan, Antique, Capiz, Iloilo
- Range coordinates: 11°09′00″N 122°13′59″E

The Central Panay Mountain Range is the longest and largest mountain range on Panay Island and in the Visayas region of the Philippines. It stretches approximately 170 km (110 mi) north–south and about 34 km (21 mi) east–west. Its highest peak is Mount Madja-as, with an elevation of 2,117 m (6,946 ft) above sea level. The range extends across western Panay, from the vicinity of Ibajay, Aklan in the north to Anini-y, Antique in the south. It covers much of the eastern portion of Antique and extends into the western areas of Iloilo, Capiz, and Aklan.

The mountain range is known for its rich biodiversity, including mossy forests, relatively undisturbed watersheds, and numerous endemic species of flora and fauna. It is also characterized by extensive river systems, waterfalls, and traditional rice terraces found in some upland communities.

== Geography ==
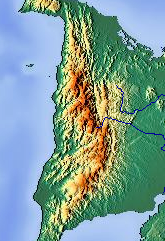
Central Panay Mountain Range relief map

The Central Panay Mountain Range is the largest mountain range in the Visayas by length and area. It contains the highest peaks on Panay Island and serves as the headwaters of the island’s major river systems, including the Panay River, the longest river on Panay at 169 km (105 mi).

The range is known for its high biodiversity and varied ecosystems, ranging from lowland forests to montane and mossy forests. It also contains cultural landscapes such as clusters of rice terraces in parts of Antique, which are associated with upland farming communities.

=== Topography ===
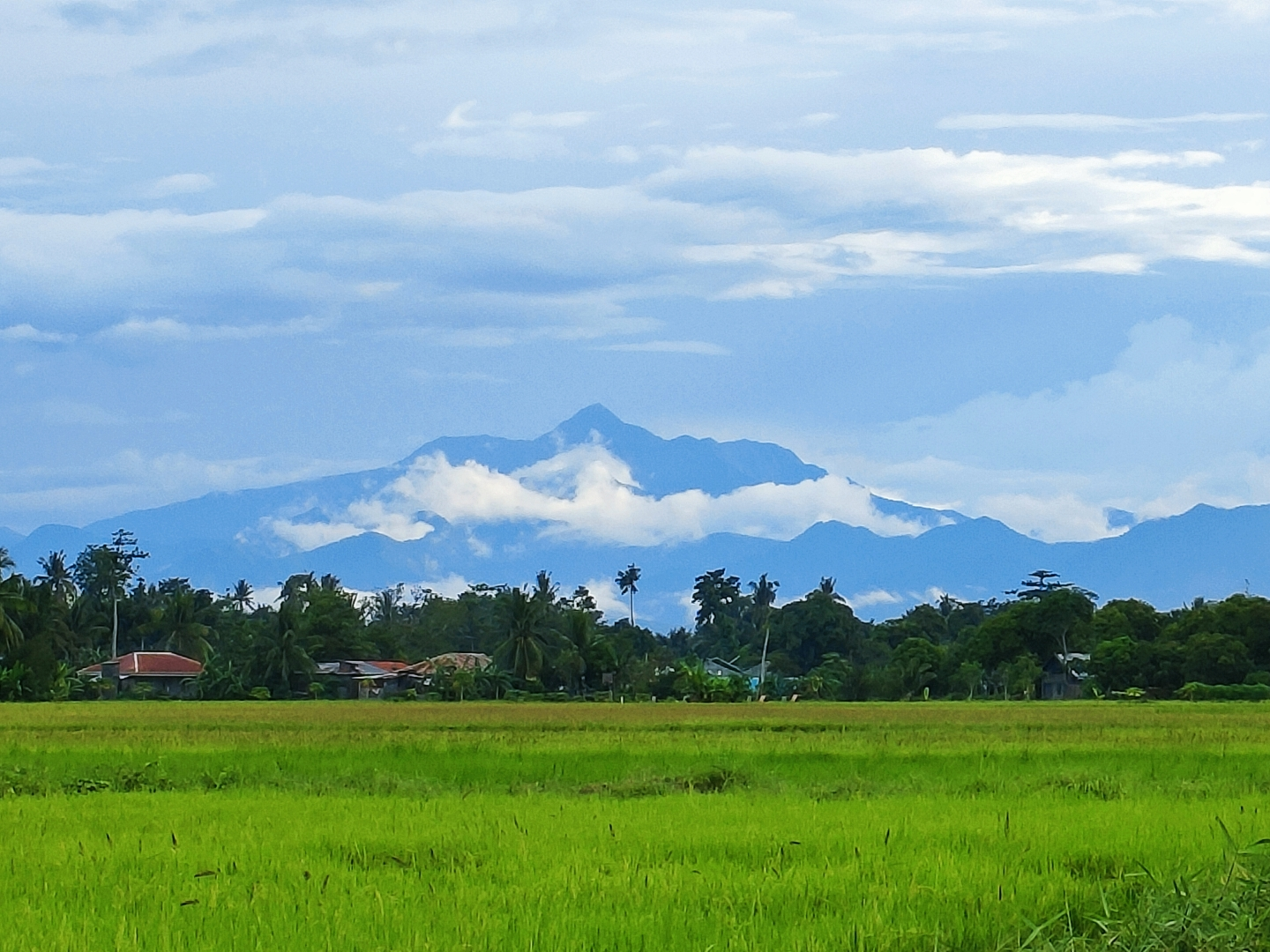
Mount Madja-as, the highest peak in Central Panay Mountain Range

List of highest peaks in Central Panay Mountain Range by elevation.

- Mount Madja-as – 6,946 ft (2,117 m)
- Mount Nangtud – 6,804 ft (2,074 m)
- E.B.J Peak – 6,512 ft (1,985 m)
- Mount Baloy – 6,424 ft (1,958 m)
- Mount Balabag – 5,630 ft (1,720 m)
- Mount Madi-ac – 5,630 ft (1,720 m)
- Mount Dumara – 5,446 ft (1,660 m)
- Mount Agbalanti – 5,187 ft (1,581 m)
- Mount Nausang – 5,138 ft (1,566 m)
- Mount Bucayan – 5,085 ft (1,550 m)
- Mount Kigas – 4,974 ft (1,516 m)
- Mount Igbanig – 4,813 ft (1,467 m)
- Mount Sipanag – 4,757 ft (1,450 m)
- Mount Inaman – 4,580 ft (1,400 m)
- Mount Tiguran – 4,524 ft (1,379 m)
- Mount Igdalig – 4,521 ft (1,378 m)
- Mount Dalagsaan – 4,474 ft (1,364 m)
- Mount Tigatay – 4,436 ft (1,352 m)
- Mount Tiran – 4,341 ft (1,323 m)
- Mount Napulac – 4,213 ft (1,284 m)
- Mount Sansanan – 4,209 ft (1,283 m)
- Mount Tiglayo – 4,075 ft (1,242 m)
- Mount Lingguhob – 3,960 ft (1,210 m)
- Mount Bantolinao – 3,960 ft (1,210 m)
- Mount Napulak – 3,940 ft (1,200 m)
- Mount Tibtib – 3,921 ft (1,195 m)
- Mount Tambara – 3,914 ft (1,193 m)
- Mount Ticbayot – 3,750 ft (1,140 m)
- Mount Sonogong – 3,648 ft (1,112 m)
- Mount Upao – 3,593 ft (1,095 m)
- Mount Patag – 3,543 ft (1,080 m)
- Mount Anoy – 3,507 ft (1,069 m)
- Mount Usigan – 3,497 ft (1,066 m)
- Mount Congcong – 3,432 ft (1,046 m)
- Mount Matarawis – 3,379 ft (1,030 m)
- Mount Balabag – 3,360 ft (1,020 m)
- Mount Tuyas – 3,343 ft (1,019 m)
- Mount Angas – 3,274 ft (998 m)
- Mount Acotay – 3,241 ft (988 m)
- Mount Palaypay – 3,238 ft (987 m)
- Mount Igabon – 3,228 ft (984 m)
- Mount Toctocan – 3,130 ft (950 m)
- Mount Tarayan – 3,084 ft (940 m)
- Mount Tulajon – 3,022 ft (921 m)
- Mount Tinayunga – 3,002 ft (915 m)
- Mount Amantara – 2,904 ft (885 m)
- Mount Tarawis – 2,887 ft (880 m)
- Mount Tuno – 2,841 ft (866 m)
- Mount Tigancal – 2,825 ft (861 m)
- Mount Ontahil – 2,789 ft (850 m)
- Mount Mingan – 2,756 ft (840 m)
- Mount Igsabu – 2,690 ft (820 m)
- Mount Agdulasan – 2,687 ft (819 m)
- Mount Mayos – 2,680 ft (820 m)
- Mount Bilbigan – 2,615 ft (797 m)
- Mount Agta – 2,592 ft (790 m)
- Mount Dalyang – 2,592 ft (790 m)
- Mount Tigbararing – 2,582 ft (787 m)
- Mount Katugpan – 2,559 ft (780 m)
- Mount Pola – 2,530 ft (770 m)
- Mount Tigdagano – 2,513 ft (766 m)
- Mount Cadayo – 2,484 ft (757 m)
- Mount Tagbagan – 2,480 ft (760 m)
- Mount Aningalan – 2,470 ft (750 m)
- Mount Punong – 2,428 ft (740 m)
- Mount Talapanan – 2,428 ft (740 m)
- Mount Manlagbo – 2,421 ft (738 m)
- Mount Igmatongtong – 2,362 ft (720 m)
- Mount Maasim – 2,336 ft (712 m)
- Mount Igkobe – 2,329 ft (710 m)
- Mount Iguiaua – 2,320 ft (710 m)
- Mount Igguiwig – 2,300 ft (700 m)
- Mount Bonbon – 2,231 ft (680 m)
- Mount Dimoros – 2,218 ft (676 m)
- Mount Igtiring – 2,198 ft (670 m)
- Mount Tigmaola – 2,057 ft (627 m)
- Mount Bangtong – 2,037 ft (621 m)
- Mount Lanas – 2,034 ft (620 m)
- Mount Malondong – 1,962 ft (598 m)
- Mount Banderahan – 1,936 ft (590 m)
- Mount Igdu-ao – 1,929 ft (588 m)
- Mount Intigban – 1,896 ft (578 m)
- Mount Caguman – 1,873 ft (571 m)
- Mount Igcoron – 1,870 ft (570 m)
- Mount Dangulao – 1,841 ft (561 m)
- Mount Pasguala – 1,834 ft (559 m)
- Mount Taratara – 1,755 ft (535 m)
- Mount Eupre – 1,673 ft (510 m)
- Mount Yabangan – 1,631 ft (497 m)
- Mount Pauican – 1,503 ft (458 m)
- Mount Patindog – 1,410 ft (430 m)
- Mount Mangarang – 1,352 ft (412 m)
- Mount Palulian – 1,325 ft (404 m)
- Mount Patindog II – 1,050 ft (320 m)
- Mount Binangbang – 1,050 ft (320 m)
- Mount Dumangsal – 787 ft (240 m)

=== River systems ===
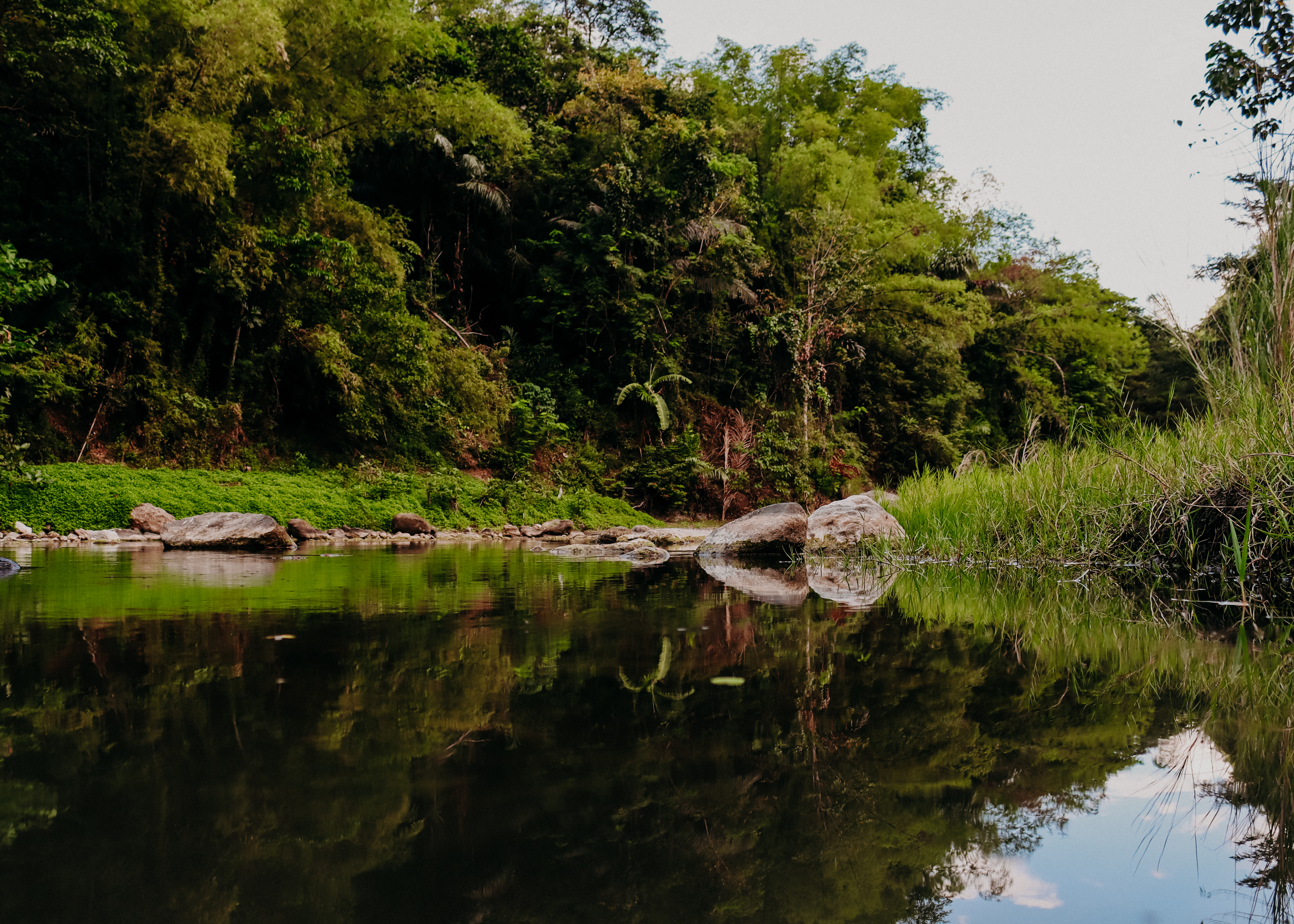
Tangyan River in Igbaras

List of rivers in Central Panay Mountain Range by length.

- Panay River – 169 km (105 miles)
- Jalaur River – 141 km (88 miles)
- Aklan River – 97 km (60 miles)
- Mambusao River – 77.3 km (48.0 miles)
- Sibalom River – 74.5 km (46.3 miles)
- Tigum River – 71.5 km (44.4 miles)
- Suage River – 64 km (40 miles)
- Badbaran River – 63.4 km (39.4 miles)
- Laglag River – 62 km (39 miles)
- Ma-ayon River – 58.9 km (36.6 miles)
- Paliwan River – 58.2 km (36.2 miles)
- Cangaranan River – 57.4 km (35.7 miles)
- Aganan River – 56 km (35 miles)
- Guimbal River – 46.9 km (29.1 miles)
- Ibajay River – 44.7 km (27.8 miles)
- Timbaban River – 42.7 km (26.5 miles)
- Barotac River – 39.8 km (24.7 miles)
- Dalanas River – 35.2 km (21.9 miles)
- Tipulu-an River – 33.1 km (20.6 miles)
- Dumarayray River – 32.6 km (20.3 miles)
- Cairawan River – 31.5 km (19.6 miles)
- Maninila River – 31.1 km (19.3 miles)
- Tangyan River – 30.5 km (19.0 miles)
- Ypayo River – 29.2 km (18.1 miles)
- Siuaragan River – 28.4 km (17.6 miles)
- Tapaz River – 27.1 km (16.8 miles)
- Tangalan River – 27 km (17 miles)
- Tibiao River – 26.4 km (16.4 miles)
- Mali-ao River – 26.3 km (16.3 miles)
- Cadi-an River – 25 km (16 miles)
- Lawigan River – 24.3 km (15.1 miles)
- Cata-an River – 23.4 km (14.5 miles)
- Tiolas River – 20.3 km (12.6 miles)
- Cabay-ang River – 19.5 km (12.1 miles)
- Tumagbok River – 19.5 km (12.1 miles)
- Paningayan River – 18.7 km (11.6 miles)
- Malandog River – 17.8 km (11.1 miles)
- Oyungan River – 16.9 km (10.5 miles)
- Kigas River – 16.2 km (10.1 miles)
- Bacong River – 16.1 km (10.0 miles)
- Bayunan River – 16 km (9.9 miles)
- Mao-it River – 15.8 km (9.8 miles)
- Baloy River – 15.4 km (9.6 miles)
- Carit-an River – 15.1 km (9.4 miles)
- Hamtic River – 14.8 km (9.2 miles)
- Casay River – 14.3 km (8.9 miles)
- Bucayan River – 14.1 km (8.8 miles)
- Guinsang-an River – 13.8 km (8.6 miles)
- Iba River – 13.1 km (8.1 miles)
- Naulid River – 12.7 km (7.9 miles)
- Cansilayan River – 12.5 km (7.8 miles)
- Bulanao River – 12.3 km (7.6 miles)
- Aras-Asan River – 11.5 km (7.1 miles)
- Inyawan River – 11.4 km (7.1 miles)
- Bugasong River – 11.4 km (7.1 miles)
- Mamara River – 11.3 km (7.0 miles)
- Unidos River – 10.6 km (6.6 miles)
- Panganta River – 10.4 km (6.5 miles)
- Paningayan River – 10.4 km (6.5 miles)
- Binangbang River – 10.4 km (6.5 miles)
- Baluon River – 10.1 km (6.3 miles)
- Bajay River – 10 km (6.2 miles)
- Abiera River – 8.7 km (5.4 miles)
- Dao River – 8.6 km (5.3 miles)
- Igpasungaw River – 8.2 km (5.1 miles)
- Memero River – 6.2 km (3.9 miles)
- Nalusdan River – 5.8 km (3.6 miles)
- Aguila River – 5.5 km (3.4 miles)
- Bitadnon River – 5.4 km (3.4 miles)
- Nalupa River – 5.3 km (3.3 miles)
- Igbarawan River – 5.2 km (3.2 miles)
- Laua-an River – 4.6 km (2.9 miles)

=== Waterfalls ===
- Tarugan Falls, Igbaras
- Nasuraan Falls, Libacao
- Tigmalmos Falls, Tibiao
- Lagsacan Falls, Igbaras
- Nadsadjan Falls, Igbaras
- Kamalasag Falls, Sebaste
- Guiritsan Falls, Igbaras
- Miagos Falls, Igbaras
- Sigbungon Falls, Barbaza
- Igpasungaw Falls, Sebaste
- Bulwang Falls, Sebaste
- Bolinao Falls, Valderrama
- Pangitanan Falls, Libertad
- Bugtong Bato Falls, Tibiao
- Macalbag Falls, Barbaza
- Bugsukan Falls, Tubungan
- Tarayan Falls, Laua-an
- Nawidwid Falls, Ibajay
- Mount Madjaas Waterfalls, Culasi
- Ring Falls, Panipiason, Madalag
- Sayay Falls, Barbaza
- Cadiao Falls, Barbaza
- Igcalaya Falls, Lambunao
- Ayo Falls, Igcabugao, Igbaras
- Libug Falls, Mount Madjaas, Culasi
- Agtuhangin Falls, Madalag
- Apok-Apok Falls, San Remigio
- Nabaya Falls, Bugasong
- Pangilatan Falls, Tapaz
- Bato Sumpit Falls, Tubungan
- Kiput Falls, Bgy. Passi, Igbaras
- Imoy Falls, Bucari, Leon
- Iglangit Falls, San Remigio
- Capnayan Falls, Laua-an
- Binokot Falls, Tapaz
- Abakaan Falls, Buri, Tapaz
- Kataw Falls, Simbola, Culasi
- Pula Falls, San Remigio
- Kawa-kawa Falls, Valderrama
- Pisak Falls, Pandan
- Panakayan Falls, Bugasong
- Halat Falls, Igsoro, Bugasong
- Kurudyanan Falls, Igsoro, Bugasong
- Madangga Falls, Panipiason, Madalag
- Yapo Falls, Barbaza
- Aningwan Falls, Tubungan

=== Natural Parks, Lakes and Rice Terraces ===
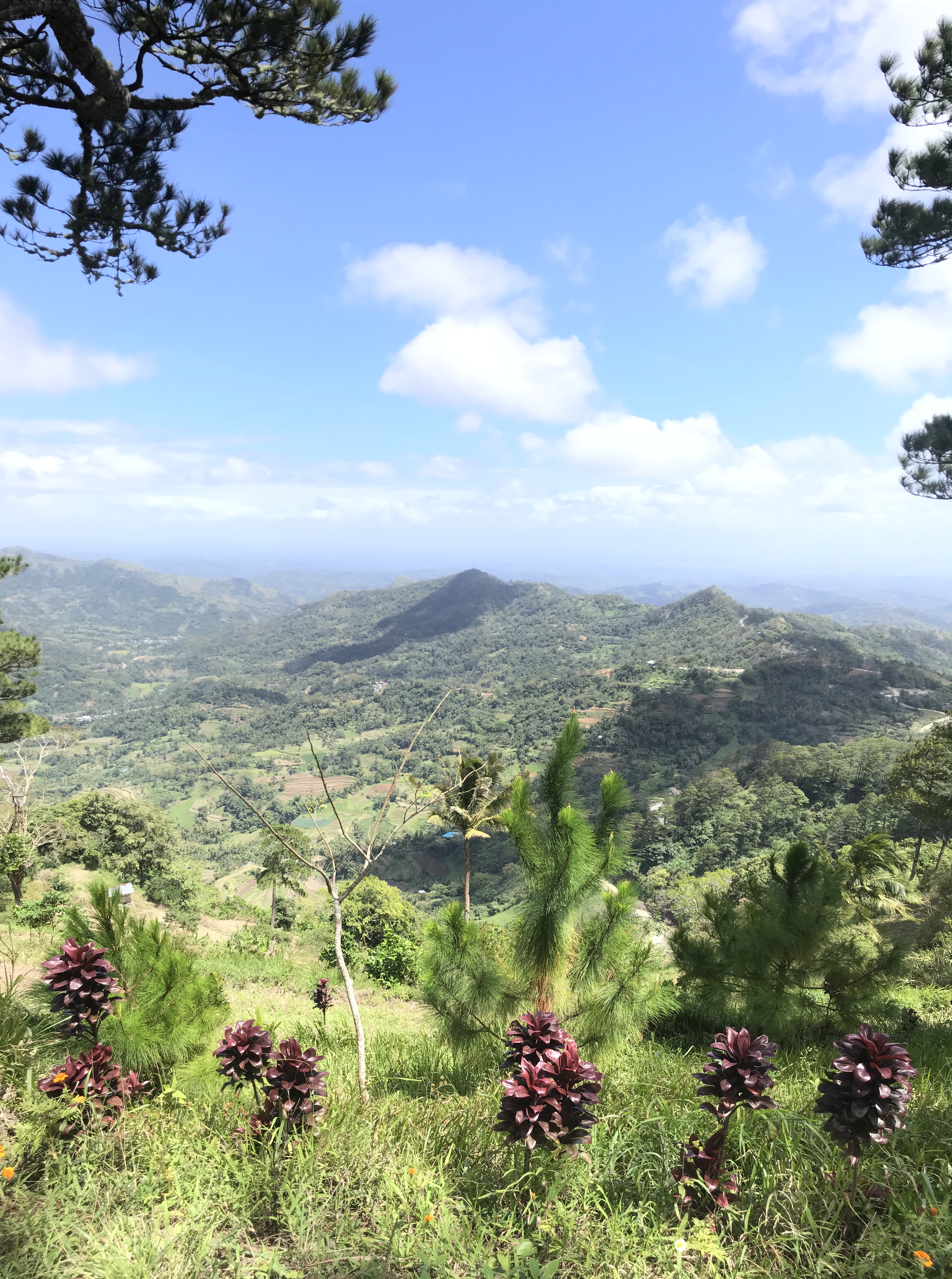
Bucari Pine Forest

- Sibalom Natural Park
- Aklan River Watershed Forest Reserve
- Aningalan Highlands
- Bucari Pine Forest
- Mount Napulak
- Tinagong Dagat
- Gen. Fullon Rice Terraces
- Tinagong Dagat
- Sinundolan Rice Terraces
- Laua-an Rice Terraces
- Bato Dungok Peak
- Tibiao Rice Terraces
- Bakiang Rice Terraces
- San Agustin Rice Terraces
- Lake Danao
- Lublub Rice Terraces
- Mayabay Rice Terraces

=== Caves ===
- Igbaclag Cave, San Remigio
- Kulapnitan Cave, Igbaras
- Matong Cave, Igbaras
- Bais Cave, Igbaras
- Igcabugao Cave, Igbaras
- Canyogan Cave, San Remigio

== Biodiversity ==
The Central Panay Mountain Range is one of the most important biodiversity areas in the Philippines and forms part of the Western Visayas Key Biodiversity Area. It contains one of the largest remaining continuous forest blocks on Panay Island, stretching from lowland dipterocarp forests up to montane and mossy forests at higher elevations. These forests serve as major watersheds for surrounding provinces, including Aklan, Antique, Capiz, and Iloilo.

The range is known for its high level of endemism, with many species found only in Panay or the Visayas. Forests in the area support a wide variety of plant life, including dipterocarp trees, ferns, orchids, and other species typical of Philippine rainforests. Higher elevations are dominated by mossy forest, where trees are shorter and often covered in epiphytes due to frequent cloud cover and high rainfall.

=== Flora ===
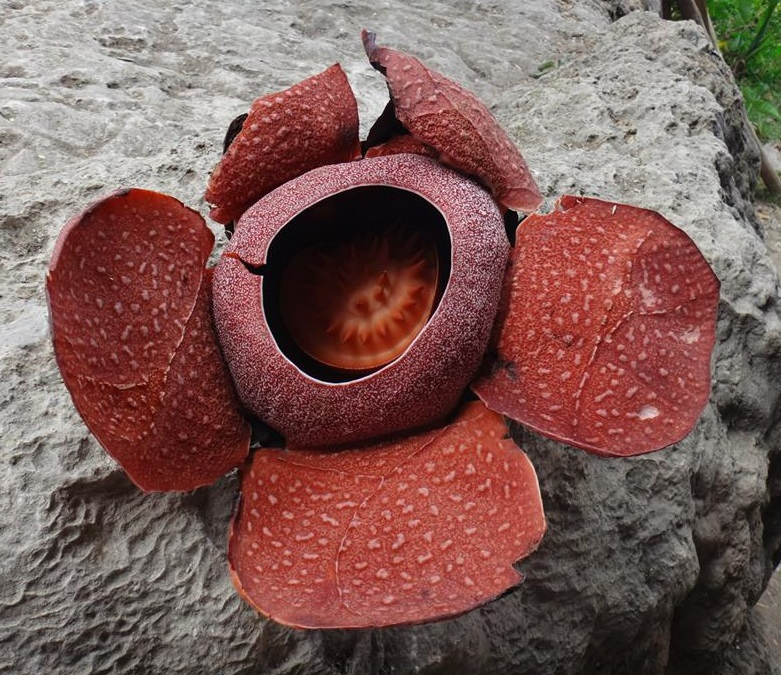
Rafflesia speciosa in Miagao

Vegetation across the mountain range is composed of diverse forest types, including lowland dipterocarp forest, secondary forest, and montane mossy forest at higher elevations. Common plant families include Dipterocarpaceae, Myrtaceae, and Fagaceae. Endemic and economically important plant species are present, including various medicinal plants used by local communities. The remaining forest cover also contains critical habitat for native orchids, ferns, and endemic tree species adapted to high rainfall and steep terrain.

=== Fauna ===
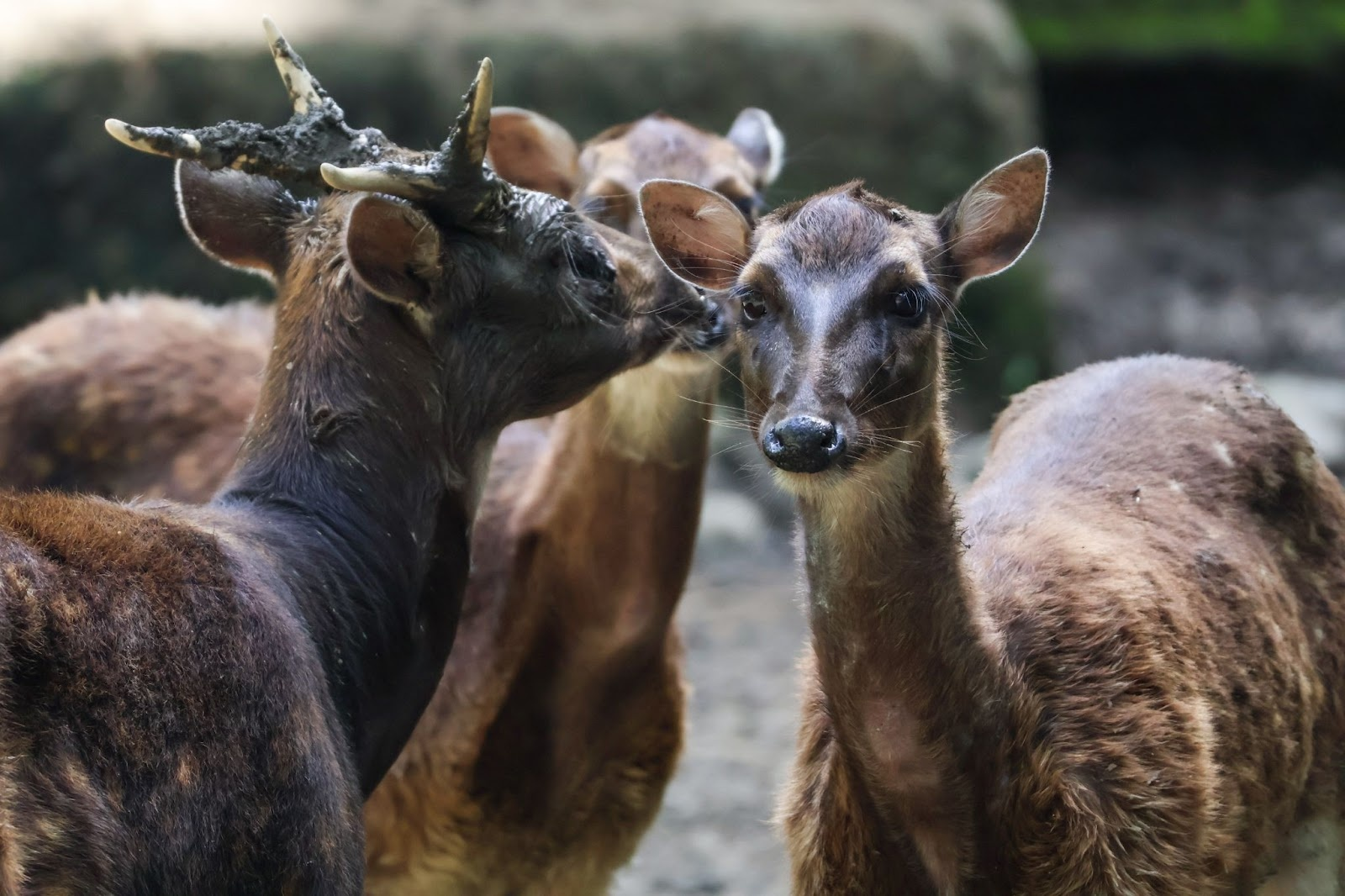
Visayan spotted deer in Iloilo

The mountain range is a center of endemism and conservation concern for Philippine wildlife. It provides habitat for several threatened and endemic species, including the Visayan warty pig (Sus cebifrons), Visayan spotted deer (Rusa alfredi), and the Rufous-headed hornbill (Rhabdotorrhinus waldeni), among others. Records from the Central Panay mountains show that many of the threatened and limited-range species found in the Negros and Panay Endemic Bird Area have been observed in the area.

Herpetofauna diversity is also significant. Recent studies document multiple endemic amphibians, including species restricted to Panay Island, such as forest frogs in the genus Platymantis. Surveys have recorded amphibian assemblages across streams, lowland forests, and montane habitats, highlighting the ecological importance of intact watershed systems in the range.

The river systems originating from the range, including major watersheds such as the Panay and Jalaur river systems, support freshwater biodiversity and act as ecological corridors linking upland and lowland ecosystems.

== People ==
The Central Panay Mountain Range is home to several Indigenous cultural communities, primarily the Ati and the Panay Bukidnon, who inhabit upland and forested areas across Antique, Iloilo, Capiz, and Aklan.

The Ati are among the earliest known inhabitants of Panay Island and are found in scattered communities across the mountains and forest margins. They are traditionally mobile forest-dwelling groups, although many now also live in more settled upland and river valley communities.

The Panay Bukidnon (also known in some literature as Sulod or Tumandok) are Indigenous peoples concentrated in the interior mountainous areas of Central Panay. Their communities are mainly found in upland barangays of Janiuay, Lambunao, Calinog, and Leon in Iloilo; Valderrama, Tibiao, Barbaza, Culasi, and San Remigio in Antique; Tapaz in Capiz; and Libacao in Aklan, where many settlements are located in interior forested and river valley areas.

The Panay Bukidnon traditionally relied on forest resources, shifting cultivation, hunting, and river systems for subsistence. Their cultural life includes oral epics such as the sugidanon, as well as distinct systems of leadership and customary law that remain practiced in some communities today.

== Gallery ==
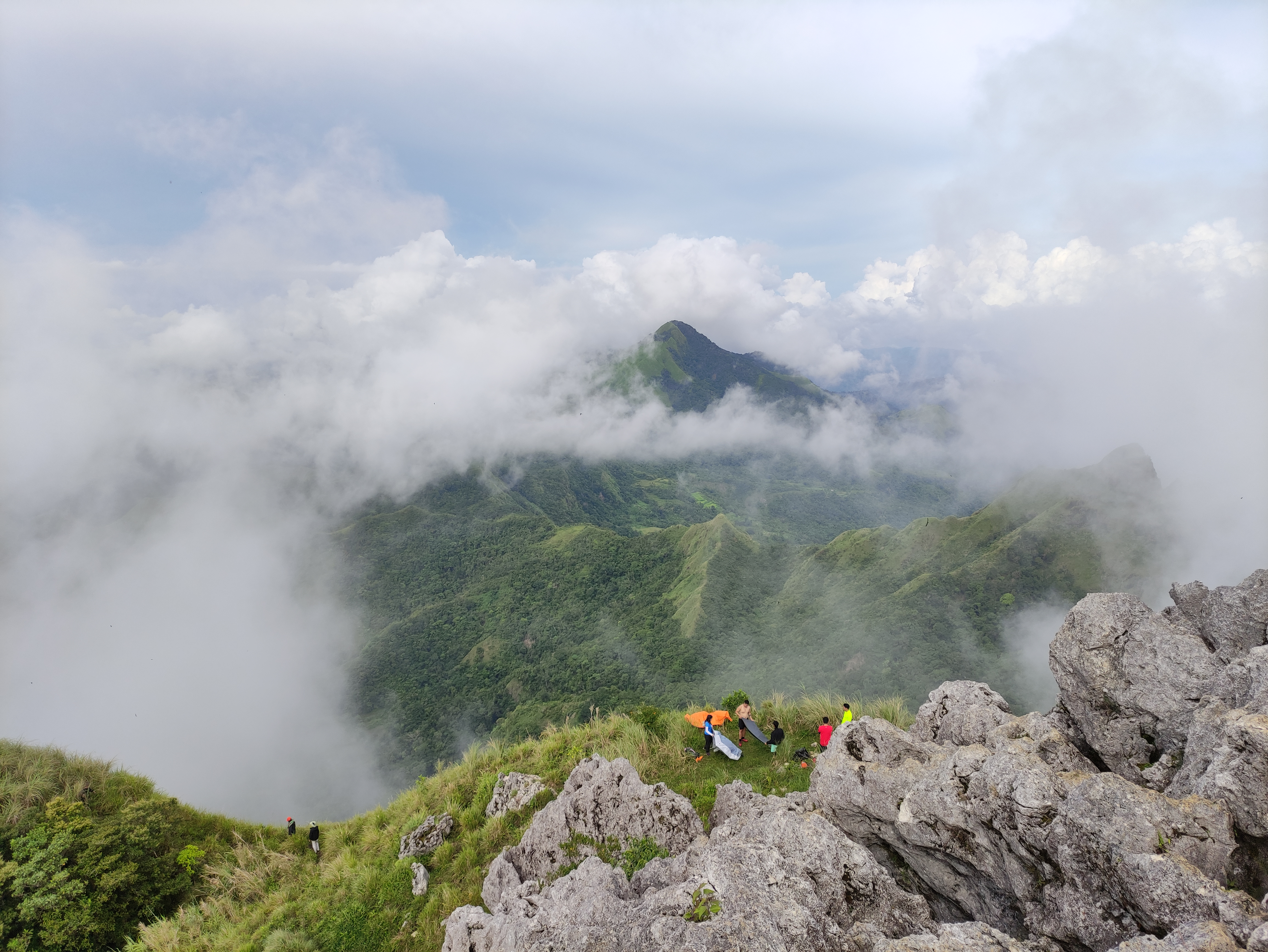
Mount Napulak

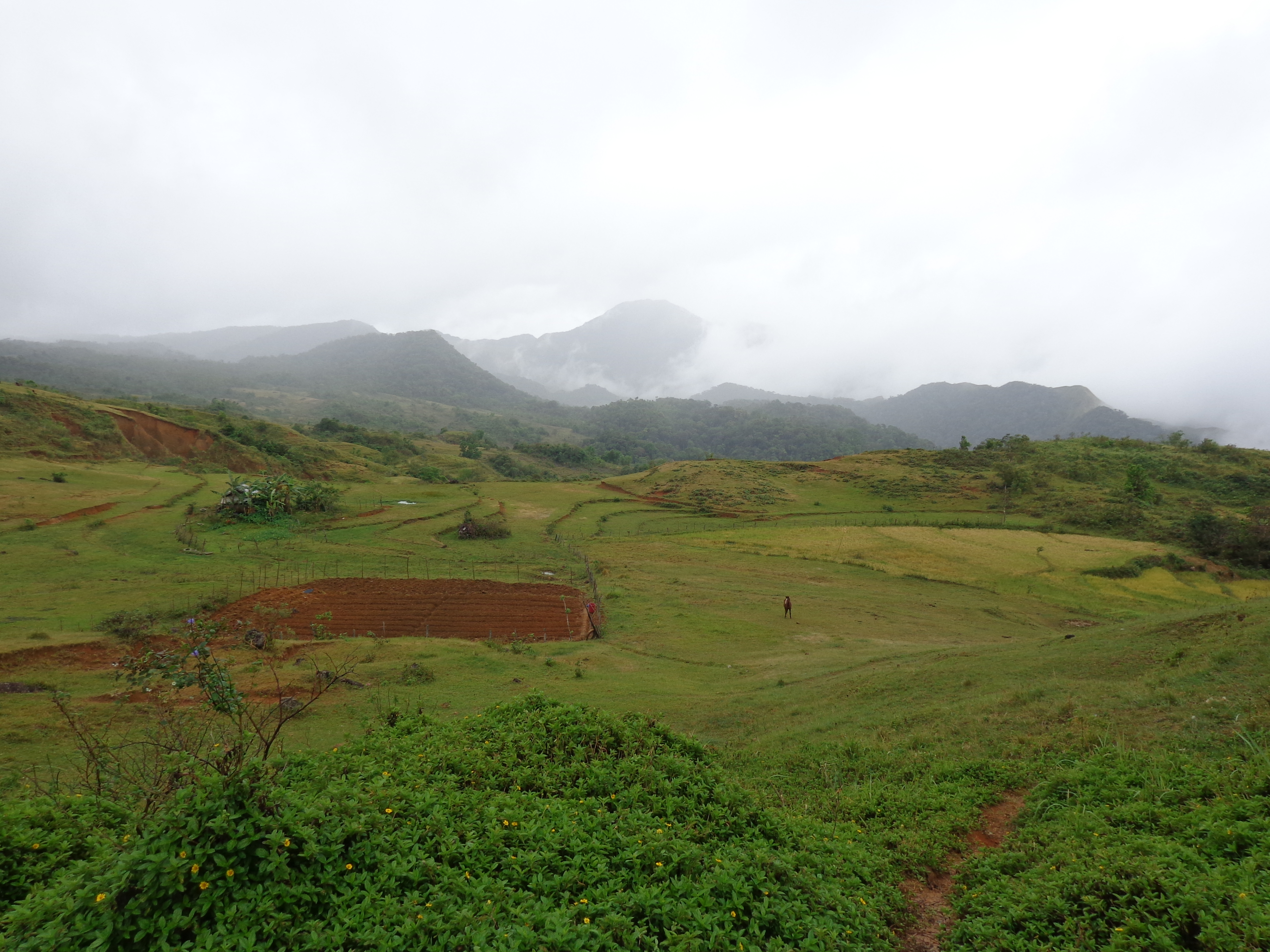
The mountain range in San Remegio, Antique

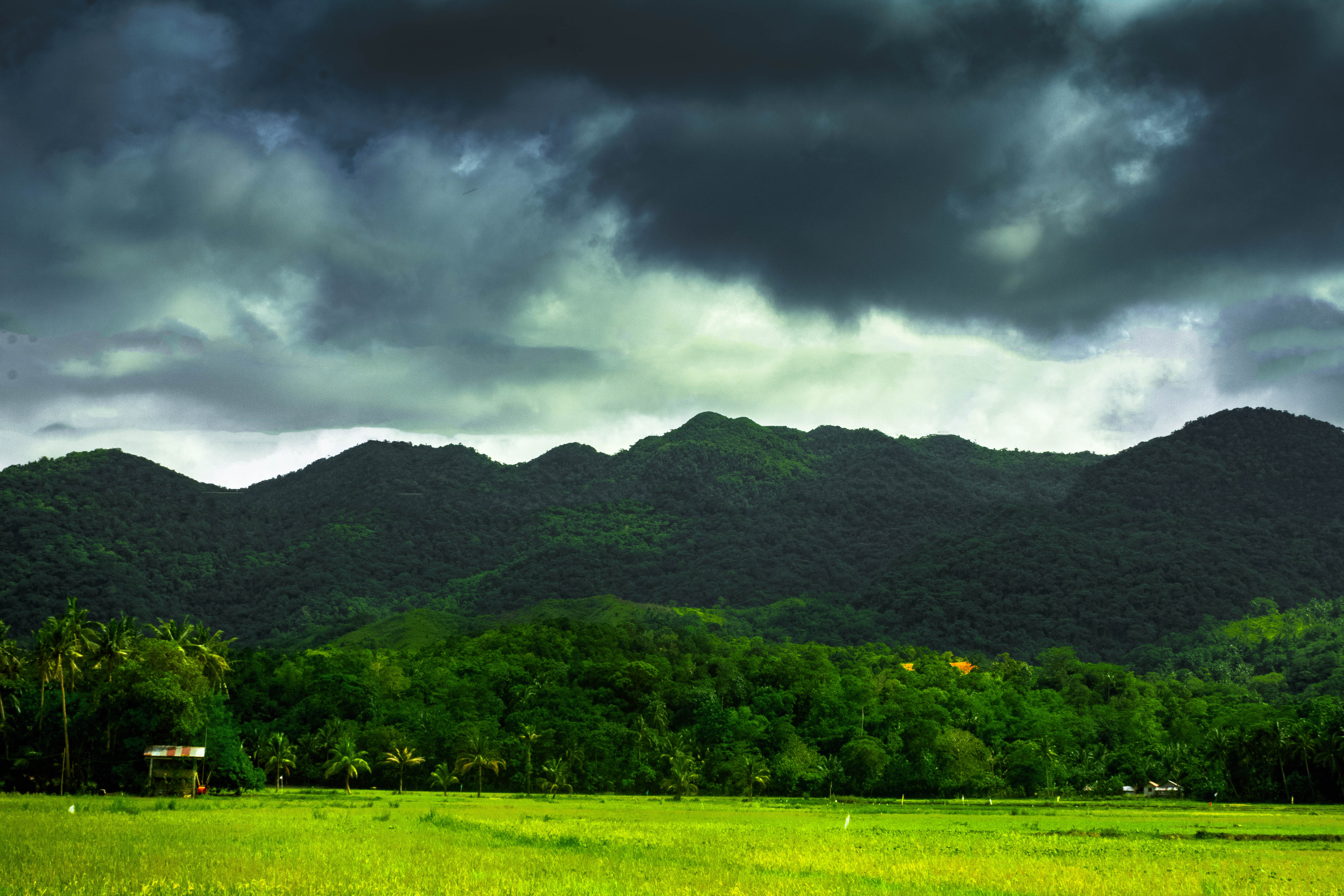
Northwest Panay Mountain Range in Libertad, Antique

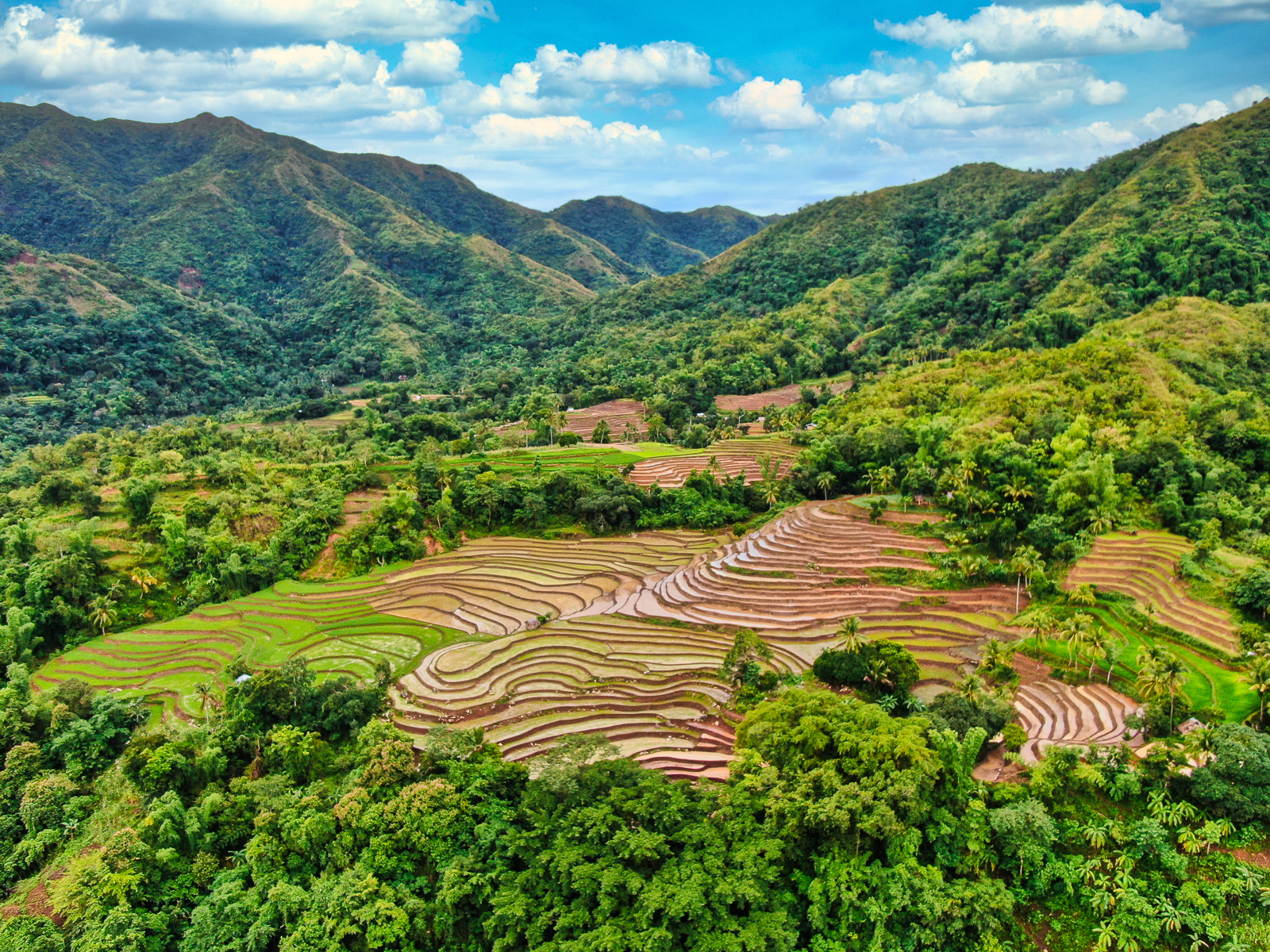
Tibiao Rice Terraces

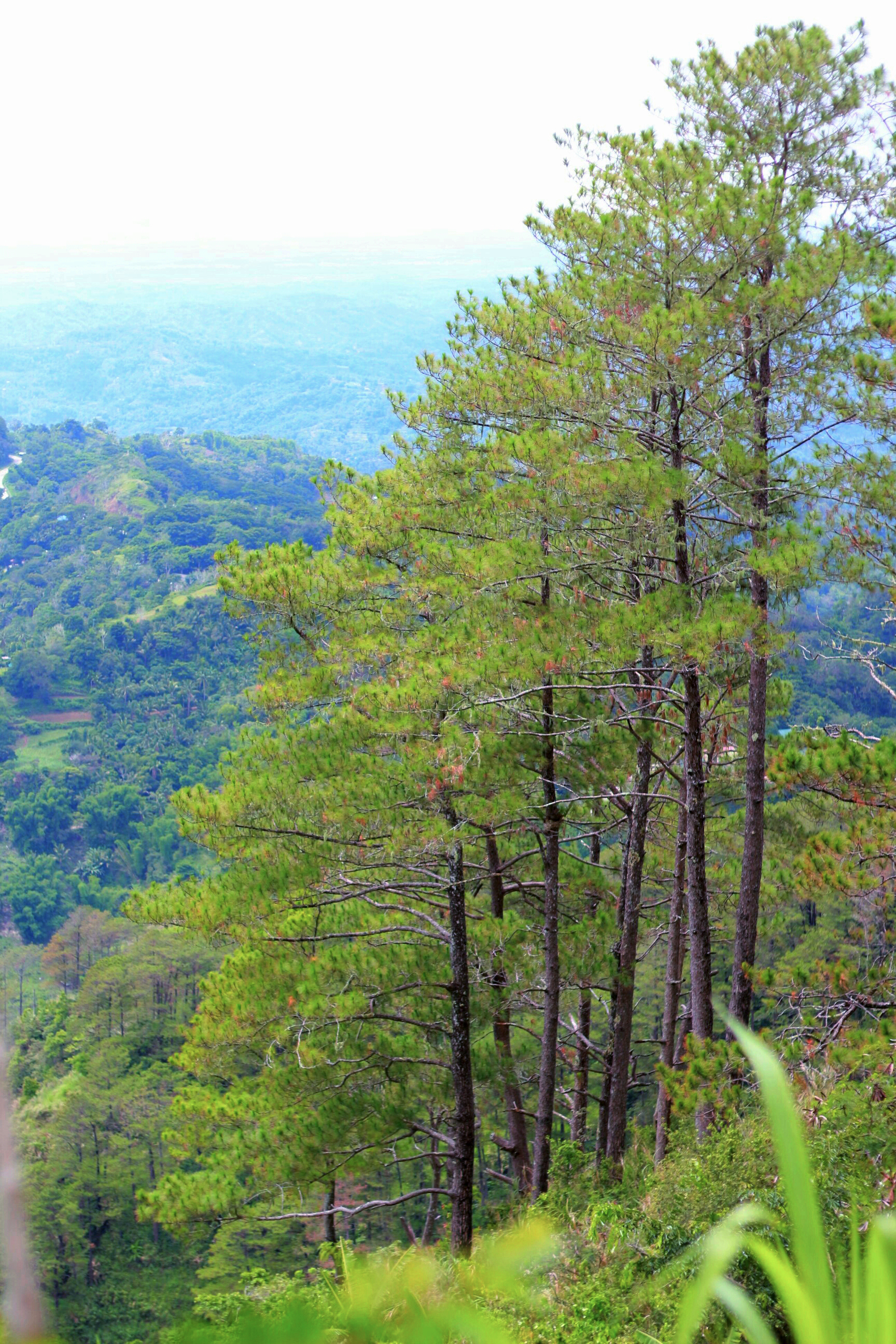
Bucari Pine Forest
