= Aklan River =

River in Aklan, Philippines

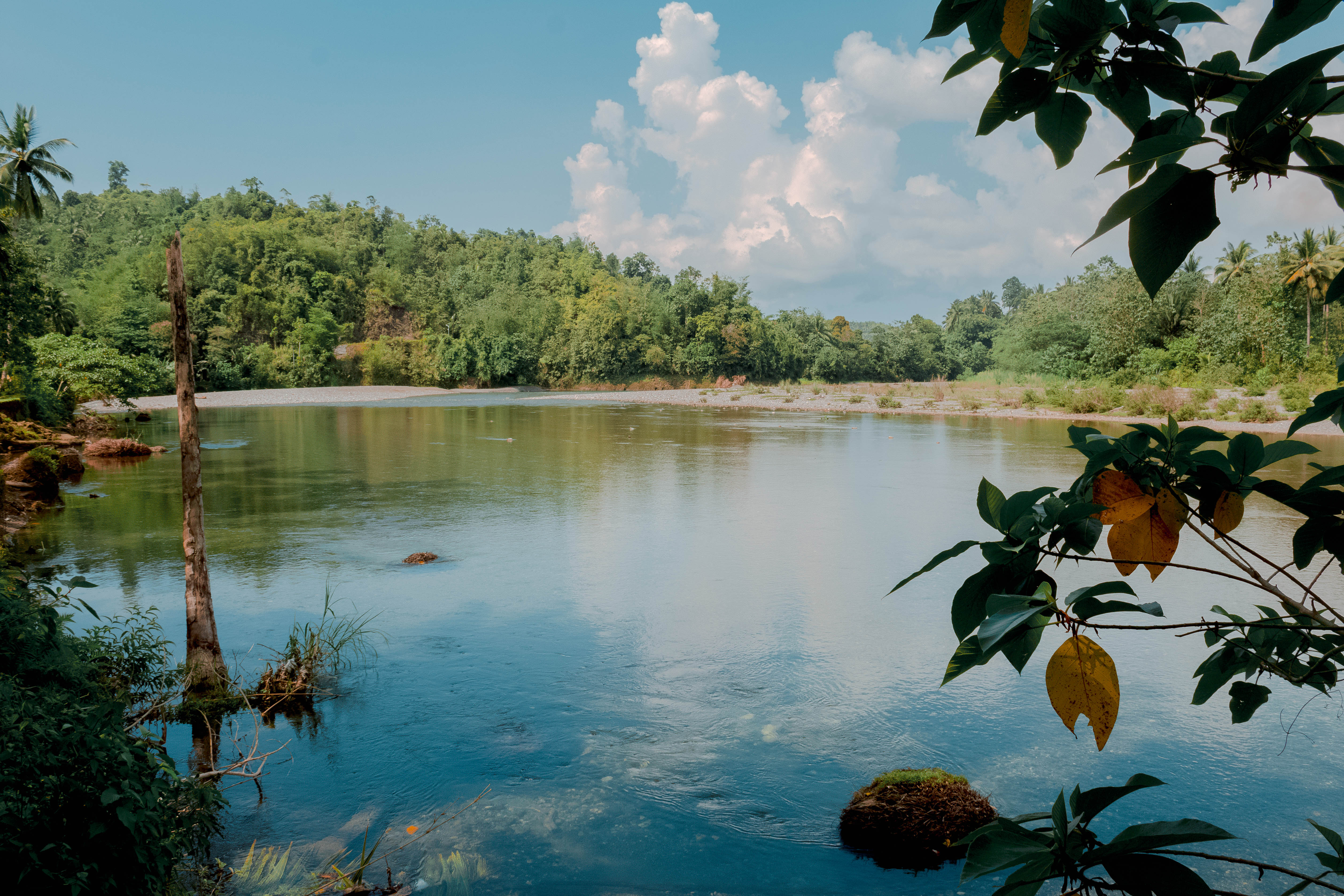
- Aklan River in Madalag, Aklan

- Aklan River mouth Aklan River (Philippines)

Location
- Country: Philippines
- Region: Western Visayas
- Province: Aklan
- City/municipality: Madalag; Malinao; Banga; Lezo; Numancia; Kalibo

Physical characteristics
- Source: Central Panay Mountain Range
  - location: Mount Baloy Tapaz, Capiz
- Mouth: Sibuyan Sea
  - location: Kalibo, Aklan
  - coordinates: 11°44′15″N 122°22′00″E
  - elevation: 0 m (0 ft)
- Length: 97 km (60 mi)
- Basin size: 908 km^{2} (351 sq mi)
- Discharge
  - average: 89 m^{3}/s (3,100 cu ft/s)
  - maximum: 1,057 m^{3}/s (37,300 cu ft/s)

Basin features
- Tributaries
  - left: Timbaban River; Dumarayray River

The Aklan River is the longest river in the province of Aklan, Philippines, and third-longest river on Panay island (after the Panay River in Capiz and Jalaur River in Iloilo). Its drainage basin is the third largest in Panay. The river source is located in the Central Panay Mountain Range on Mount Baloy in the western portion of Capiz in the vicinity of Tapaz. It flows northwards to the mountainous western portion of Jamindan, then northeastward to the town of Libacao in Aklan province. The river traverses the municipalities of Madalag, Malinao, Banga, Lezo, Numancia, and Kalibo before emptying to its mouth into Sibuyan Sea. The name of the river is where the term Aklan came from, and is derived from the word akae, which means to boil or to froth. Because of the swiftness of the river current, the water of the Aklan river seems to boil or froth. Akean therefore means "where there is boiling or frothing".

The two major tributaries of the river are the Timbaban River (Madalag River) and Dumarayray River. A portion of the river's basin is protected in the Aklan River Watershed Forest Reserve. This 23,185 hectares (57,290 acres) reserve in the municipalities of Madalag and Libacao was formed in 1990 through Proclamation No. 600, for purposes to protect, maintain, or improve the water yield and provide restraining mechanism for inappropriate forest exploitation and disruptive land-use.

== Tributaries ==
List of Aklan River tributaries in upstream order:

- Malinao River
- Timbaban River
  - Kinalanga River
- Dumalaylay River
- Dit-ana River

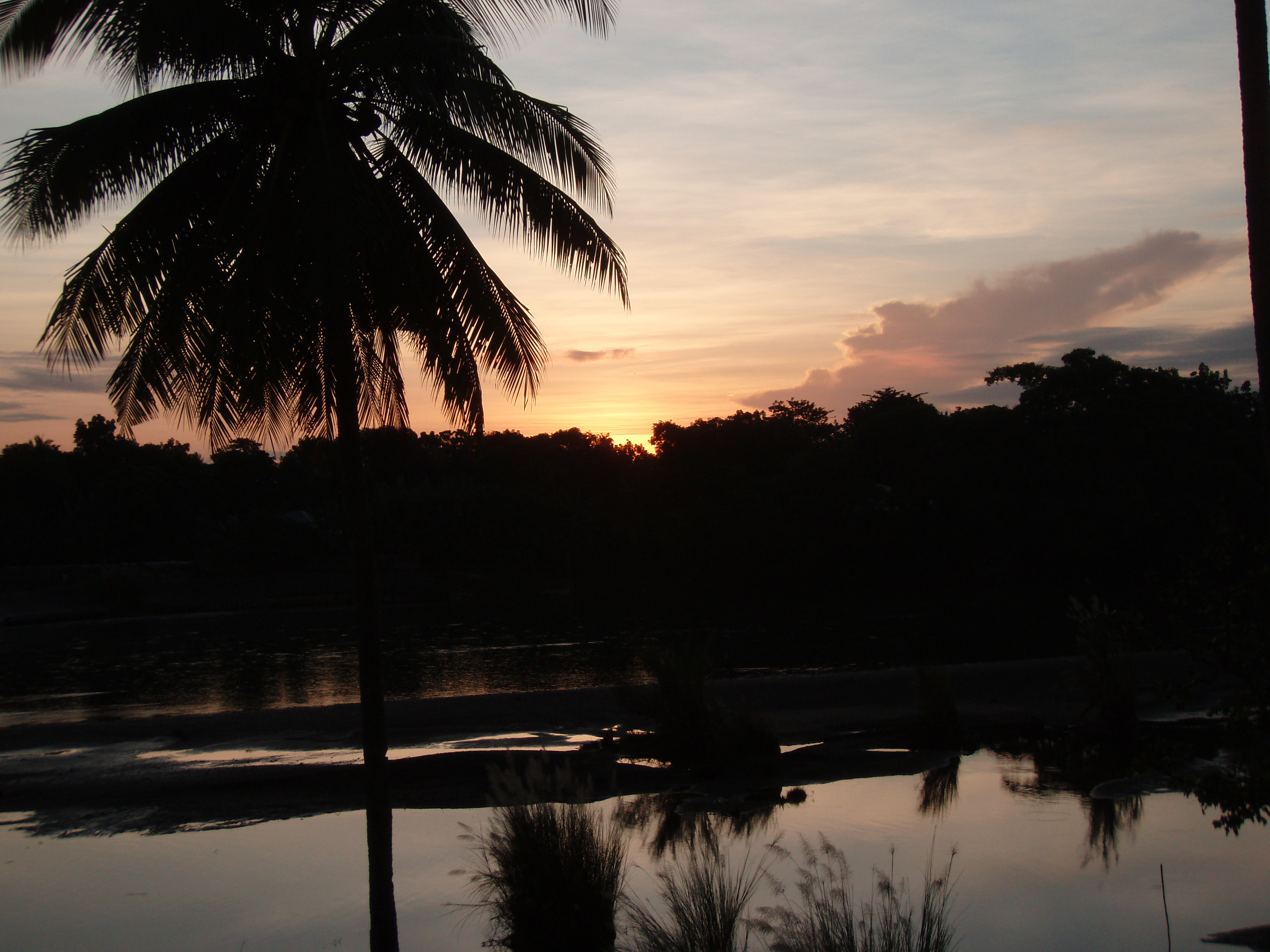
Sunrise over the Aklan River
