= Panay River =

River in Panay Island, Philippines

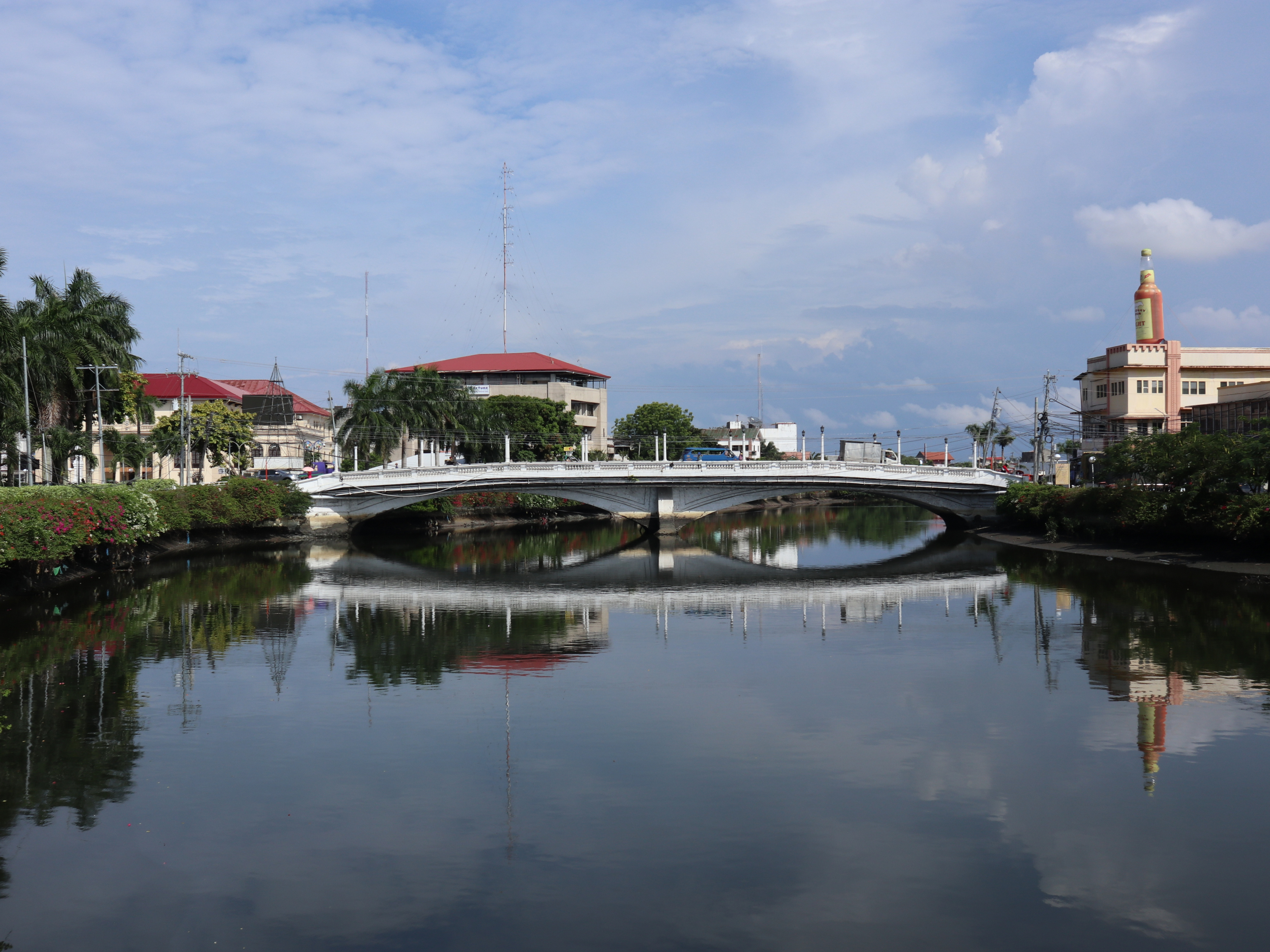
- Panay River in Roxas City

- Panay River mouth Panay River (Philippines)

Location
- Country: Philippines
- Region: Western Visayas
- Province: Capiz
- City/municipality: Tapaz; Dumalag; Cuartero; Dao; Panitan; Panay

Physical characteristics
- Source: Central Panay Mountain Range
  - location: Mount Angas, Tapaz, Capiz
- Mouth: Sibuyan Sea
  - location: Roxas City
  - coordinates: 11°35′05″N 122°42′57″E
  - elevation: 0 m (0 ft)
- Length: 152 kilometres (94 mi)
- Basin size: 2,203.76 km^{2} (850.88 mi^{2})
- Discharge
  - average: 119.75 m^{3}/s (4,229 cu ft/s)

Basin features
- Tributaries
  - left: Tapaz River; Mambusao River
  - right: Badbaran River; Maayon River

The Panay River (known as Pan-ay River) is the longest river on Panay Island in the Philippines, with a total length of approximately 152 kilometres (94 mi) and a drainage basin area of 2,203.76 square kilometres (850.88 sq mi). It drains almost the entire province of Capiz and northern portion of Iloilo province.

The source of the Panay River is on the slopes of Mount Igabon–Mount Angas Mountain Range. Starting in Tapaz, it runs southward and changing its direction toward east-northeast to Dumalag and Cuartero, then traversing north through the municipalities of Dao and Panitan. In Panay the river splits, with the primary branch emptying into the Sibuyan Sea at Roxas City.

== Tributaries ==
The main tributaries of the river are the Tapaz River and Mambusao River on the left and the Badbaran River and Maayon River on the right.

Panay River list of tributaries by length:

1. Mambusao River (sub-basin area 487.86 km^{2} (188.36 sq mi))
2. Badbaran River (sub-basin area 342.52 km^{2} (132.25 sq mi))
3. Ma-ayon River (sub-basin area 358.76 km^{2} (138.52 sq mi))
4. Tapaz River
