= Madalag =

Municipality in Aklan, Philippines

- Municipality
- Municipality of Madalag
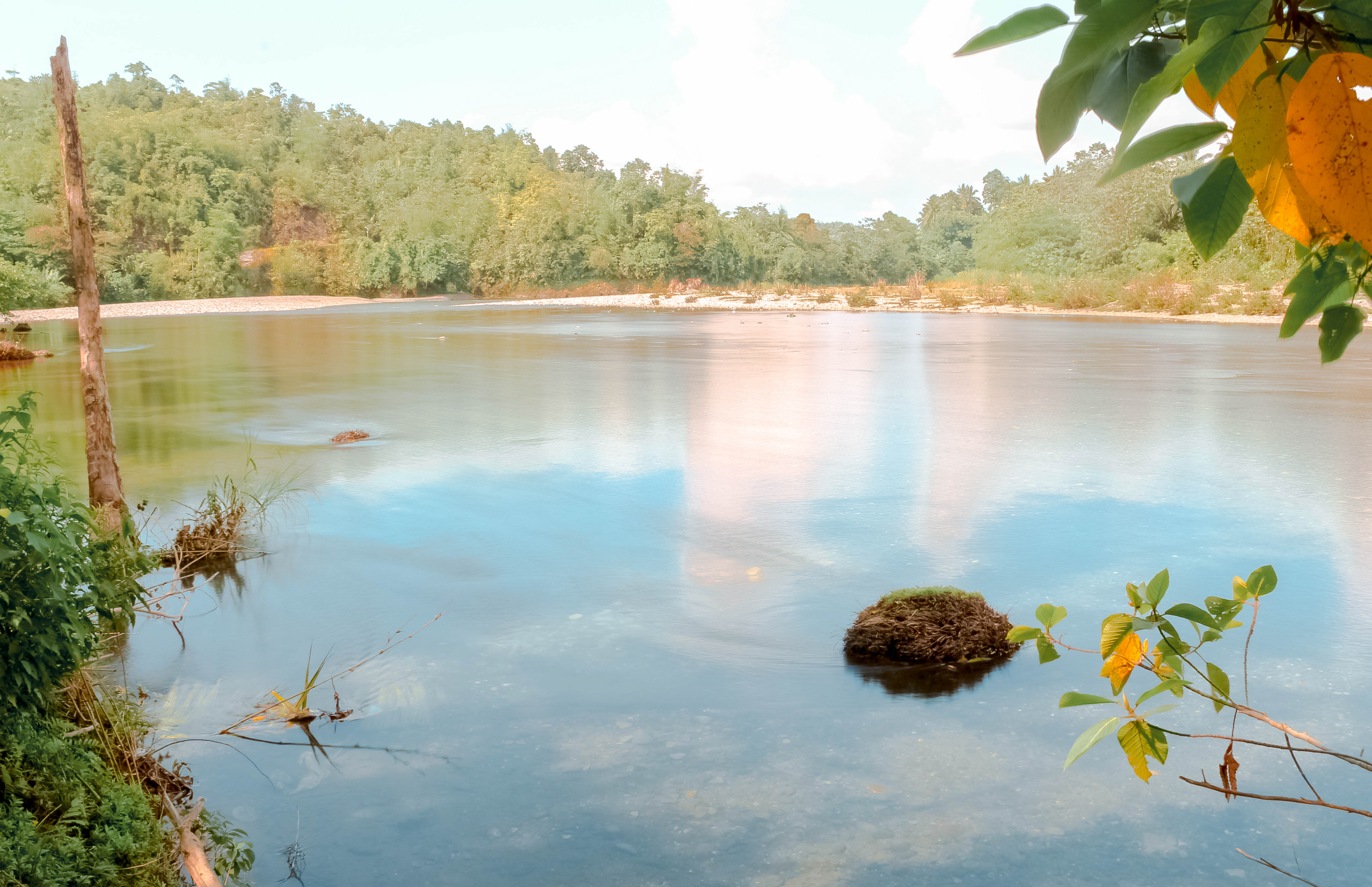
- Aklan River in Madalag

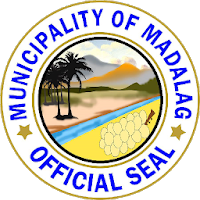
- Flag Seal
- Motto: Madalagnon Ako Banwa Ko Amligan Ko
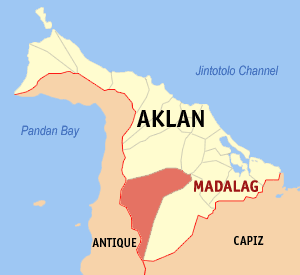
- Map of Aklan with Madalag highlighted
- Interactive map of Madalag
- Location within the Philippines
- Coordinates: 11°31′37″N 122°18′23″E
- Country: Philippines
- Region: Western Visayas
- Province: Aklan
- District: 1st district
- Founded: 1948
- Barangays: 25 (see Barangays)

Government
  - Type: Sangguniang Bayan
  - Mayor: Rex T. Gubatina
  - Vice Mayor: Alfonso A. Gubatina
  - Representative: Carlito S. Marquez
  - Municipal Council: Members: Jessie Tumaca; Pop Inosanto; Eudes Torres; Felzon Nagtalon; Anthony Nabor; Julius nadua; Allan Lim; Jan Navarrete
  - Electorate: 13,456 voters (2025)

Area
  - Total: 269.6 km^{2} (104.1 sq mi)
- Highest elevation (Mount Timbaban): 1,777 m (5,830 ft)

Population (2024 census)
  - Total: 19,043
  - Density: 70.63/km^{2} (182.9/sq mi)
  - Households: 4,638
- Demonym: Madalagnon

Economy
  - Income class: 3rd municipal income class
  - Poverty incidence: 14.79% (2023)
  - Revenue: ₱ 168.7 million (2024)
  - Assets: ₱ 516.1 million (2024)
  - Expenditure: ₱ 170.5 million (2024)
  - Liabilities: ₱ 43.49 million (2024)

Service provider
  - Electricity: Aklan Electric Cooperative (AKELCO)
- Time zone: UTC+8 (PST)
- ZIP code: 5603
- PSGC: 060410000
- IDD : area code: +63 (0)36
- Native languages: Aklanon; Hiligaynon; Tagalog

Madalag, officially the Municipality of Madalag (Aklanon: Banwa it Madalag; Hiligaynon: Banwa sang Madalag; Tagalog: Bayan ng Madalag), is a municipality in the province of Aklan, Philippines. It the largest municipality in terms of land area and also the most sparsely populated in the province. According to the 2024 census, it has a population of 19,043 people.

== Etymology ==
A local story explains that Madalag’s name came from the word “madaeag,” a term for yellowish or muddy water. When Spaniards reached the area, they asked residents for the name of the place. The people thought they were asking about the river and said “ro tubi madaeag,” describing the water. The visitors later adapted the name as Madalag, since the original word was difficult for them to pronounce.

== History ==
The town was formerly an arrabal and part of Libacao. In 1948, it was separated and constituted as a separate town, with the following barrios: Logohon, Singay, Balactasan, Cabangahan, Cabilawan, Pangitan, San Jose, Talimagao, Talangban, Alaminos, Catabana, Bakyang, Calicia, Mercedes, Maria Cristina, Dit-ana, Guinato-an, Tigbauan, Alas-as, Mamba, Medina, Panikyason, and Paningayan.

== Geography ==
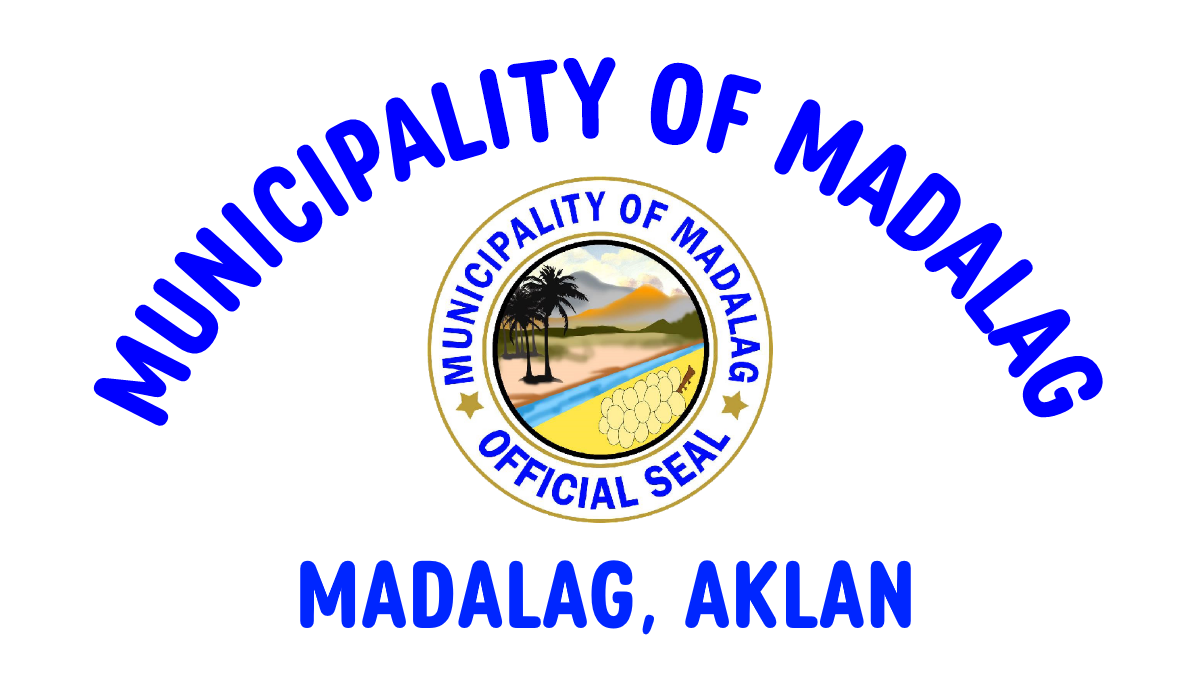
Variant flag of Madalag

According to the Philippine Statistics Authority, the municipality has a land area of 269.6 square kilometers (104.1 sq mi) constituting 14.80% of the 1,821.42-square-kilometer- (703.25 sq mi) total area of Aklan.

Madalag is situated in the south-central section of the province, bounded on the east by Balete, west by the Province of Antique, north by Malinao and Banga, and south by Libacao. It is 192 kilometers (119 mi) away from regional capital, Iloilo City, and 34 kilometers (21 mi) south from the provincial capital Kalibo.

=== Barangays ===
Madalag is politically subdivided into 25 barangays. Each barangay consists of puroks and some have sitios.

PSGC	Barangay	Population			±% p.a.	
		2024		2010		
060410001	Alaminos	6.6%	1,257	1,071	▴	1.12%
060410002	Alas-as	3.7%	710	684	▴	0.26%
060410003	Bacyang	2.7%	509	439	▴	1.03%
060410004	Balactasan	3.9%	735	722	▴	0.12%
060410005	Cabangahan	2.3%	433	494	▾	−0.91%
060410006	Cabilawan	2.6%	487	616	▾	−1.62%
060410007	Catabana	2.4%	448	513	▾	−0.94%
060410008	Dit-Ana	2.3%	441	395	▴	0.77%
060410009	Galicia	1.9%	363	362	▴	0.02%
060410010	Guinatu-an	2.3%	445	404	▴	0.67%
060410011	Logohon	2.6%	504	523	▾	−0.26%
060410012	Mamba	4.4%	830	756	▴	0.65%
060410013	Maria Cristina	4.7%	887	938	▾	−0.39%
060410014	Medina	5.8%	1,105	1,085	▴	0.13%
060410015	Mercedes	2.9%	546	543	▴	0.04%
060410016	Napnot	2.7%	517	789	▾	−2.89%
060410017	Pang-itan	4.8%	906	893	▴	0.10%
060410018	Paningayan	5.9%	1,127	1,352	▾	−1.26%
060410019	Panipiason	7.8%	1,484	1,326	▴	0.78%
060410020	Poblacion	9.3%	1,775	1,562	▴	0.89%
060410021	San Jose	4.9%	937	863	▴	0.57%
060410022	Singay	2.2%	413	450	▾	−0.59%
060410023	Talangban	2.7%	506	437	▴	1.02%
060410024	Talimagao	1.8%	347	345	▴	0.04%
060410025	Tigbawan	3.6%	677	606	▴	0.77%
	Total		19,043	18,168	▴	0.33%

=== Climate ===
Climate data for Madalag, Aklan
Month	Jan	Feb	Mar	Apr	May	Jun	Jul	Aug	Sep	Oct	Nov	Dec	Year
Mean daily maximum °C (°F)	27 (81)	28 (82)	30 (86)	32 (90)	32 (90)	30 (86)	29 (84)	29 (84)	29 (84)	29 (84)	29 (84)	28 (82)	29 (85)
Mean daily minimum °C (°F)	22 (72)	22 (72)	22 (72)	23 (73)	25 (77)	25 (77)	24 (75)	24 (75)	24 (75)	24 (75)	24 (75)	23 (73)	24 (74)
Average precipitation mm (inches)	47 (1.9)	33 (1.3)	39 (1.5)	48 (1.9)	98 (3.9)	150 (5.9)	169 (6.7)	147 (5.8)	163 (6.4)	172 (6.8)	118 (4.6)	80 (3.1)	1,264 (49.8)
Average rainy days	11.4	8.2	9.3	9.7	19.1	25.6	27.4	25.5	25.5	25.2	18.5	14.5	219.9
Source: Meteoblue (Use with caution: this is modeled/calculated data, not measured locally.)

Madalag has a Type III climate which is relatively dry from March to May and wet for the rest of the year.

=== Land use ===
Some 7,717.0251 hectares (19,069.184 acres) or 28.80% of Madalag land area is planted with high value crops leaving only about 17,772.1917 hectares (43,916.042 acres) (66.35) as timber land and 24.6342 hectares (60.872 acres) or .09% are utilized as dwelling areas majority of which are in the Poblacion.

=== Soil ===
There are four varied soil types found in the municipality. They are the San Miguel Clay Loam, Alimodian clay loam, Sapcan clay and Sigcay clay. San Miguel clay is found in barangay Panipiason and Medina. Alimodian clay is found in barangay San Jose, Ma. Cristina and Galicia. Sapian clay is found in the barangay of Mercedes, Bacyang and Alaminos. Sigcay clay is found in the Poblacion, Logohon and Cabilawan.

== Demographics ==
Population census of Madalag
Year	Pop.	±% p.a.
1903	3,476	—
1948	8,664	+2.05%
1960	10,883	+1.92%
1970	12,440	+1.34%
1975	14,209	+2.70%
1980	14,128	−0.11%
1990	15,166	+0.71%
1995	16,659	+1.77%
2000	17,441	+0.99%
2007	17,889	+0.35%
2010	18,168	+0.56%
2015	18,389	+0.23%
2020	18,890	+0.57%
2024	19,043	+0.19%
Source: Philippine Statistics Authority

In the 2024 census, Madalag had a population of 19,043 people. The population density was 71 inhabitants per square kilometre (180/sq mi).

Madalag being predominantly a rural community has a slow growing population. It had a total population of 17,889 persons in 2007, a reduction of .05 percent or 897 persons from the 1995 population, basically due to migration towards industrial and trade centers of the country such as Manila, Cebu, Iloilo and other highly urbanized provinces and municipalities.

The municipality has twenty-five component barangays with two barangays, Poblacion and Alaminos as urban area and the twenty-three remaining barangays as rural areas. Barangay Poblacion is the most populous with 1,775 residents, followed by Panipiason (1,484 residents) and Alaminos (1,257).

== Economy ==
Poverty incidence of Madalag (%)

Source: Philippine Statistics Authority

=== Agriculture ===
Madalag basically has an agricultural economy. Some 7,717.0251 hectares (19,069.184 acres) of the municipality land is devoted to agriculture. Farming and home industries are the main source of livelihood among the people. Rice is grown in almost all the twenty five (25) barangays. Corn is also planted in some upland areas. Other crops are in pineapple, camote and ube. The municipality also produces fruit trees, like lanzones, rambutan, marang and commercial crops such as coconut and abaca.

The hilly and mountainous areas produce high valued forest products such as narra, acacia, and mahogany and minor product like buri, rattan, bamboo, nipa sap and firewood.

=== Industry ===
The center of commercial activities in Madalag is situated along the 1.50-kilometer (0.93 mi) stretch of Navarette Street and at the Madalag Public Market located in the Poblacion.

The municipality has 93 commercials establishment dominated by the sari-sari stores (37 or 39%). The others establishment (26 or 28.60%) serve as outlet for bakery, carinderias and other recreational services.

== Infrastructure ==
=== Communication ===
The communication system is operated by mobile signals distributed by Smart, Globe and Dito, while the postal system is managed by the Philippine Postal Corporation. The post office is managed by a postal master, and a mail sorter/carrier. There are no mail distribution and collection centers in the barangays, hence the residents go to the Poblacion to post or receive their mails.

=== Power and energy ===
There are 100 households in the barangay Poblacion of Madalag served by electricity with only 5 percent of households not served by power. The remaining twenty-four have electrical power.

=== Transportation ===
The total length of all roads types within the geographical boundaries of the municipality is 38.50 kilometers (23.92 mi) in 2011. Of these lengths, ten percent are paved. A total of fifty percent of the road surface is earth fill while thirty percent is gravel surface. All barangays are accessible by roads except, Medina and Panipiason, that cannot be reach by four wheel vehicle. Generally, the barangays connected to the national road have better road condition compared to the interior barangays.

=== Water system ===
Water is supplied by the Poblacion Water District and Poblacion Spring Development. The other barangays are dependent from their Spring Development and artesian and shallow wells.

== Healthcare ==
Madalag has one rural health unit (RHU) and one municipal hospital (Don Leovigildo N. Diapo Sr Memorial Hospital).

== Education ==
The Madalag Schools District Office governs all educational institutions within the municipality. It oversees the management and operations of all private and public, from primary to secondary schools.

Madalag has 21 primary and 8 elementary schools with a total enrollment of 2,927 pupils and 108 teachers. It has three secondary public schools with a total enrollment of 1,368 students and 43 teachers.

=== Primary and elementary schools ===
- Alaminos Elementary School
- Alas-as Primary School
- Bacyang Primary School
- Balactasan Elementary School
- Cabangahan Primary School
- Cabilawan Primary School
- Catabana Primary School
- Daguitan (Ilaya) Primary School
- Dit-ana Primary School
- Galicia Primary School
- Guinatu-an Primary School
- Libas Primary School
- Logohon Primary School
- Madalag Elementary School
- Mamba Elementary School
- Mananggad Primary School
- Mercedes Primary School
- Napnot Primary School
- Pang-itan Elementary School
- Paningayan Elementary School
- Panipiason Primary School
- San Jose Elementary School
- Singay Primary School
- Talangban Primary School
- Talimagao Primary School
- Tigbawan Primary School

=== Secondary schools ===
- Agtughangin Integrated School
- Loreto N. Nedic National High School (Alaminos National High School)
- Ma. Cristina Integrated School
- Madalag National High School
- Madalag National High School (Mamba Ext)
- Medina Integrated School
