= Sebaste, Antique =

Municipality in Antique, Philippines

Sebaste
- Municipality
- Municipality of Sebaste
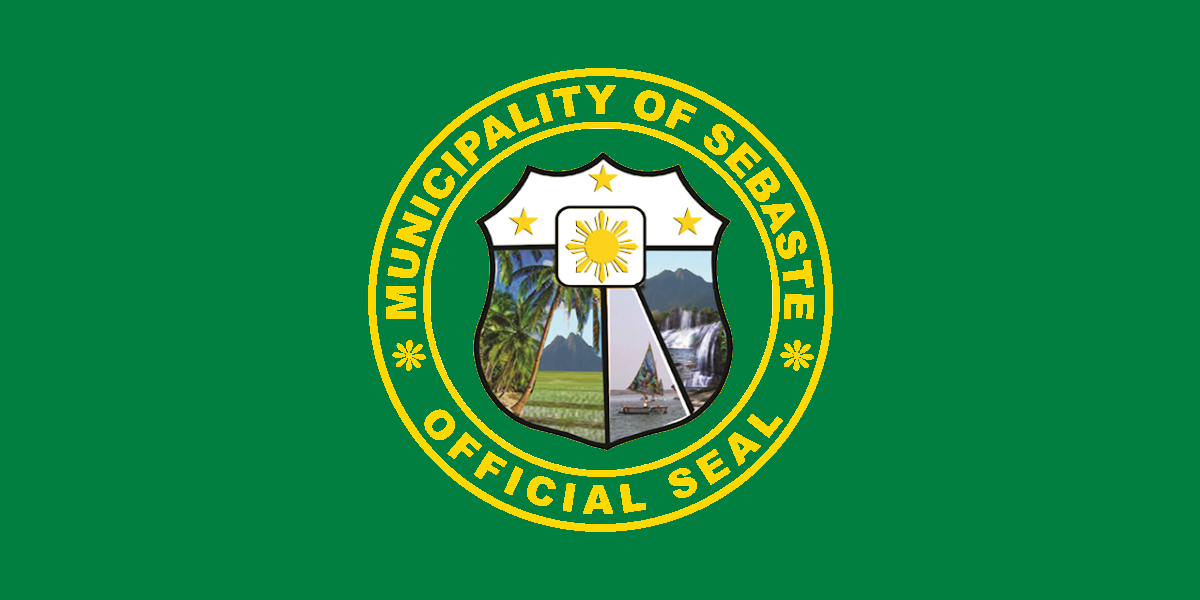
- Flag

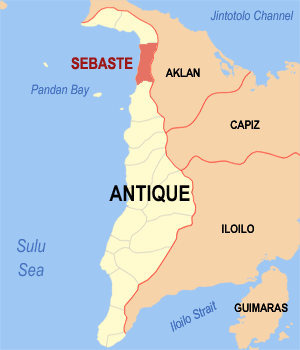
- Map of Antique with Sebaste highlighted
- Interactive map of Sebaste
- Location within the Philippines
- Coordinates: 11°35′24″N 122°05′40″E
- Country: Philippines
- Region: Western Visayas
- Province: Antique
- District: Lone district
- Barangays: 10 (see Barangays)

Government
  - Type: Sangguniang Bayan
  - Mayor: January C. Padpad
  - Vice Mayor: Jonathan A. Dioso
  - Representative: Anthony Agapito B. Legarda Jr.
  - Municipal Council: Members: Joey H. Padojinog; Roy De Los Reyes; Gerry F. Vellermosa; Niño Varona; Lea Lomugda; Felino O. Gauran; Noel C. Dimafiles; Jaff Rennon B. Azucena
  - Electorate: 12,865 voters (2025)

Area
  - Total: 111.64 km^{2} (43.10 sq mi)
- Elevation: 154 m (505 ft)
- Highest elevation (Mount Acotay): 988 m (3,241 ft)
- Lowest elevation: 0 m (0 ft)

Population (2024 census)
  - Total: 19,365
  - Density: 173.46/km^{2} (449.26/sq mi)
  - Households: 4,561

Economy
  - Income class: 3rd municipal income class
  - Poverty incidence: 15.11% (2023)
  - Revenue: ₱ 159.8 million (2024)
  - Assets: ₱ 479.6 million (2024)
  - Expenditure: ₱ 135.9 million (2024)
  - Liabilities: ₱ 236.6 million (2024)

Service provider
  - Electricity: Antique Electric Cooperative (ANTECO)
- Time zone: UTC+8 (PST)
- ZIP code: 5709
- PSGC: 060615000
- IDD : area code: +63 (0)36
- Native languages: Karay-a; Hiligaynon; Tagalog

Sebaste, officially the Municipality of Sebaste (Kinaray-a: Banwa kang Sebaste; Hiligaynon: Banwa sang Sebaste; Tagalog: Bayan ng Sebaste), is a municipality in the province of Antique, Philippines. According to the 2024 census, it has a population of 19,365 people.

== Geography ==
Sebaste is located at 11°35′24″N 122°05′40″E. It is 112 kilometres (70 mi) from the provincial capital, San Jose de Buenavista, and is 70 kilometres (43 mi) from Kalibo, the capital of Aklan.

According to the Philippine Statistics Authority, the municipality has a land area of 111.64 square kilometres (43.10 sq mi) constituting 4.09% of the 2,729.17-square-kilometre- (1,053.74 sq mi) total area of Antique.

=== Barangays ===
Sebaste is politically subdivided into 10 barangays. Each barangay consists of puroks and some have sitios.

PSGC	Barangay	Population			±% p.a.	
		2024		2010		
060615001	Abiera	14.6%	2,832	2,673	▴	0.40%
060615002	Aguila	7.4%	1,427	1,410	▴	0.08%
060615003	Alegre	3.0%	575	524	▴	0.65%
060615004	Aras-Asan	8.7%	1,693	1,643	▴	0.21%
060615005	Bacalan	12.8%	2,470	2,332	▴	0.40%
060615006	Callan	9.3%	1,797	1,689	▴	0.43%
060615010	Idio	11.5%	2,229	2,198	▴	0.10%
060615007	Nauhon	4.9%	957	899	▴	0.43%
060615008	P. Javier	1.4%	269	248	▴	0.57%
060615009	Poblacion	18.9%	3,658	3,654	▴	0.01%
	Total		19,365	17,270	▴	0.80%

=== Climate ===
Climate data for Sebaste, Antique
Month	Jan	Feb	Mar	Apr	May	Jun	Jul	Aug	Sep	Oct	Nov	Dec	Year
Mean daily maximum °C (°F)	28 (82)	29 (84)	30 (86)	32 (90)	32 (90)	31 (88)	30 (86)	30 (86)	29 (84)	29 (84)	29 (84)	28 (82)	30 (86)
Mean daily minimum °C (°F)	23 (73)	22 (72)	23 (73)	24 (75)	25 (77)	25 (77)	25 (77)	24 (75)	24 (75)	24 (75)	24 (75)	23 (73)	24 (75)
Average precipitation mm (inches)	47 (1.9)	33 (1.3)	39 (1.5)	48 (1.9)	98 (3.9)	150 (5.9)	169 (6.7)	147 (5.8)	163 (6.4)	172 (6.8)	118 (4.6)	80 (3.1)	1,264 (49.8)
Average rainy days	11.4	8.2	9.3	9.7	19.1	25.6	27.4	25.5	25.5	25.2	18.5	14.5	219.9
Source: Meteoblue

== Demographics ==
Population census of Sebaste
Year	Pop.	±% p.a.
1903	2,923	—
1970	8,773	+1.65%
1975	9,205	+0.97%
1980	10,369	+2.41%
1990	12,553	+1.93%
1995	12,438	−0.17%
2000	14,973	+4.06%
2007	15,840	+0.78%
2010	17,270	+3.20%
2015	17,907	+0.69%
2020	18,816	+1.05%
2024	19,365	+0.69%
Source: Philippine Statistics Authority

In the 2024 census, Sebaste had a population of 19,365 people. The population density was 170 inhabitants per square kilometre (440/sq mi).

=== Language ===
Kinaray-a is the dominant language of Sebaste while Hiligaynon is used as a secondary language.

== Economy ==
Poverty incidence of Sebaste (%)

Source: Philippine Statistics Authority

== Culture ==
Every February 3, the people of Sebaste celebrate the annual feast of their patron, Saint Blaise.

== Education ==
The Sebaste Schools District Office governs all educational institutions within the municipality. It oversees the management and operations of all private and public, from primary to secondary schools.

The municipality has 1 private high school (Saint Blaise High School) and 1 public high school (Sebaste High School/Sebaste National High School).

=== Primary and elementary schools ===
- Abiera Elementary School
- Aguila Elementary School
- Alegre Elementary School
- Aras-asan Elementary School
- Bacalan Elementary School
- Callan Elementary School
- Idio Elementary School
- Nauhon Elementary School
- P. Javier Primary School
- Sebaste Central School

=== Secondary schools ===
- Sebaste High School
- St. Blaise High School
