= San Remigio, Antique =

Municipality in Antique, Philippines

San Remigio
- Municipality
- Municipality of San Remigio
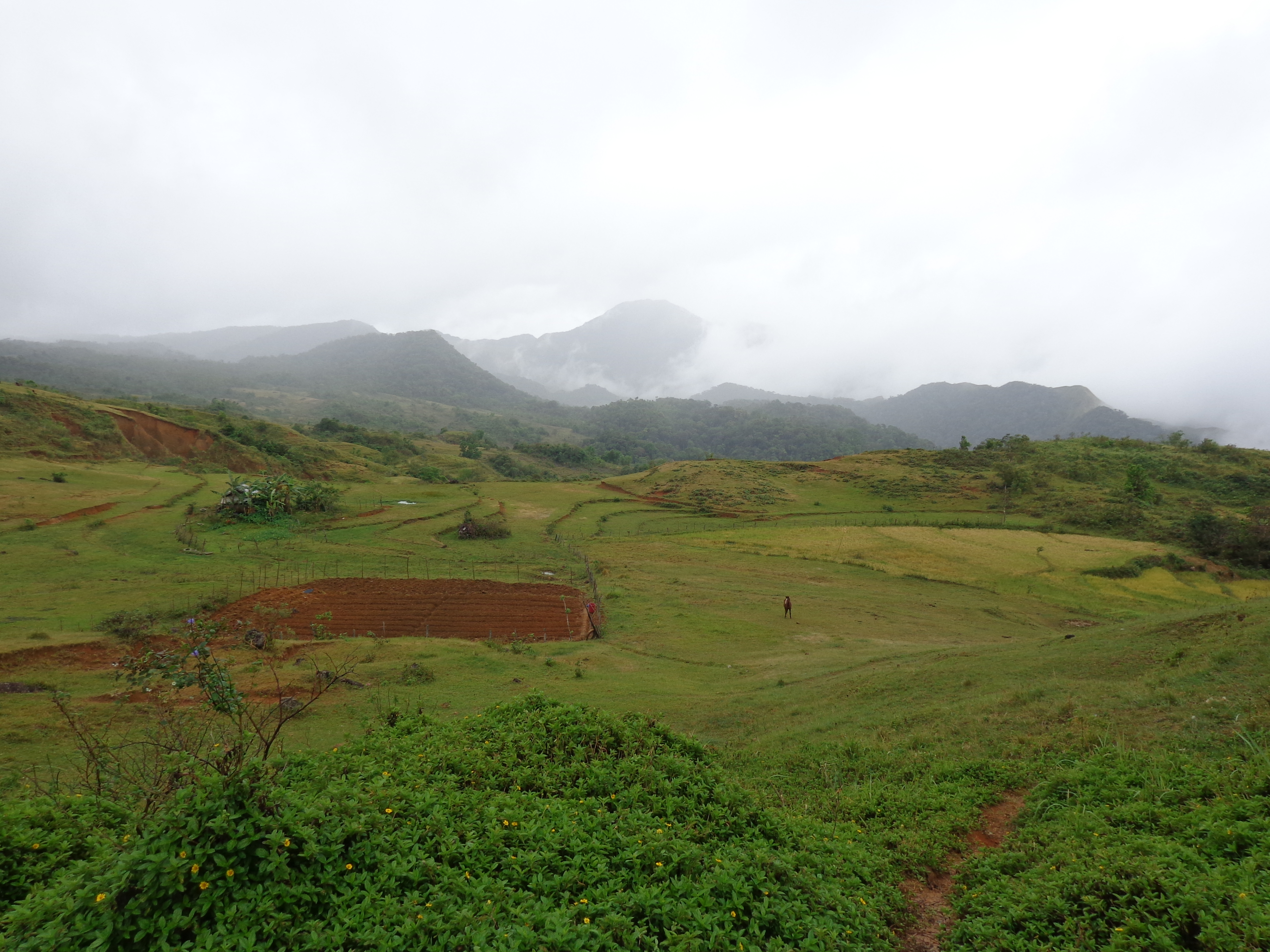
- Aningalan Highlands in San Remigio

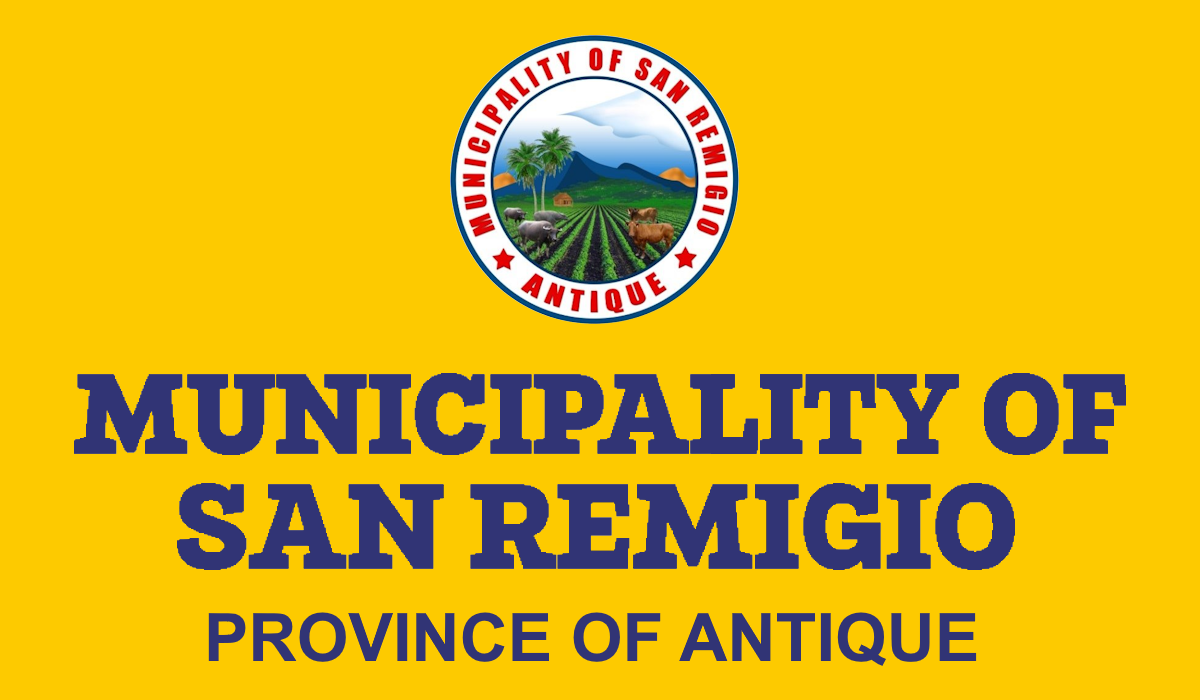
- Flag

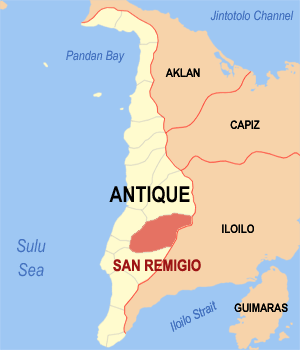
- Map of Antique with San Remigio highlighted
- Interactive map of San Remigio
- Location within the Philippines
- Coordinates: 10°49′59″N 122°05′15″E
- Country: Philippines
- Region: Western Visayas
- Province: Antique
- District: Lone district
- Founded: July 1, 1864
- Named for: Saint Remigius
- Barangays: 45 (see Barangays)

Government
  - Type: Sangguniang Bayan
  - Mayor: Margarito C. Mission Jr.
  - Vice Mayor: Eduardson G. Petinglay
  - Representative: Antonio Agapito B. Legarda Jr.
  - Municipal Council: Members: Jessie Jemar V. Fama; Felipe A. Victoriano; Rodolfo V. Medina Jr.; Sme J. Panes; Pedro O. Francisco Jr.; Goldwyn J. Cabigunda; Nanette E. Cabigunda; Rito G. Petinglay
  - Electorate: 24,188 voters (2025)

Area
  - Total: 406.98 km^{2} (157.14 sq mi)
- Elevation: 407 m (1,335 ft)
- Highest elevation (Mount Igdalig): 1,377 m (4,518 ft)
- Lowest elevation: 60 m (200 ft)

Population (2024 census)
  - Total: 36,170
  - Density: 88.87/km^{2} (230.2/sq mi)
  - Households: 7,911

Economy
  - Income class: 1st municipal income class
  - Poverty incidence: 33.46% (2023)
  - Revenue: ₱ 239.8 million (2024)
  - Assets: ₱ 639.4 million (2024)
  - Expenditure: ₱ 83.69 million (2024)
  - Liabilities: ₱ 149.6 million (2024)

Service provider
  - Electricity: Antique Electric Cooperative (ANTECO)
- Time zone: UTC+8 (PST)
- ZIP code: 5714
- PSGC: 060614000
- IDD : area code: +63 (0)36
- Native languages: Karay-a; Hiligaynon; Tagalog

San Remigio, officially the Municipality of San Remigio (Kinaray-a: Banwa kang San Remigio; Hiligaynon: Banwa sang San Remigio; Tagalog: Bayan ng San Remigio), is a municipality in the province of Antique, Philippines. According to the 2024 census, it has a population of 36,170 people. Making it 10th most populous municipality in the province of Antique and the largest municipality in terms of land area, with a total area of 406.98 square kilometers.

== History ==
On the morning of September 12, 1988, Mayor Gideon Cabigunda was traveling to meet with former members of the communist rebel group, the New People's Army (NPA), who had surrendered, when he and four of his security aides were assassinated by other NPA members. Romilo Sequrra, a 19-year-old rebel, later surrendered to authorities from the Philippine Air Force and admitted to being part of the group responsible for the assassination.

== Geography ==
San Remigio is located at 10°49′59″N 122°05′15″E. It is 21 kilometres (13 mi) north-east from the provincial capital, San Jose de Buenavista.

According to the Philippine Statistics Authority, the municipality has a land area of 406.98 square kilometres (157.14 sq mi) constituting 14.91% of the 2,729.17-square-kilometre- (1,053.74 sq mi) total area of Antique.

Almost 70% of its land area are mountainous and the remaining 30% comprise the flat lowland and rolling hills.

Agriculture occupies 47.815 square kilometres (18.461 sq mi) of land. Of this, 44.37 square kilometres (17.13 sq mi) is for food crops, 1.035 square kilometres (0.400 sq mi) is for permanent crops, and 2.41 square kilometres (0.93 sq mi) for commercial crops.

=== Barangays ===
San Remigio is politically subdivided into 45 barangays. Each barangay consists of puroks and some have sitios.

PSGC	Barangay	Population			±% p.a.	
		2024		2010		
060614001	Agricula	1.5%	547	494	▴	0.71%
060614002	Alegria	1.2%	431	422	▴	0.15%
060614003	Aningalan	1.7%	607	511	▴	1.20%
060614004	Atabay	0.5%	178	175	▴	0.12%
060614005	Bagumbayan	1.7%	612	484	▴	1.64%
060614006	Baladjay	1.8%	660	1,100	▾	−3.48%
060614007	Banbanan	0.7%	269	265	▴	0.10%
060614008	Barangbang	3.8%	1,362	1,150	▴	1.18%
060614009	Bawang	1.3%	470	441	▴	0.44%
060614010	Bugo	4.4%	1,600	1,586	▴	0.06%
060614011	Bulan-bulan	1.6%	565	541	▴	0.30%
060614012	Cabiawan	1.4%	502	449	▴	0.78%
060614013	Cabunga-an	1.3%	457	450	▴	0.11%
060614014	Cadolonan	2.6%	954	883	▴	0.54%
060614016	Carawisan I	1.5%	556	514	▴	0.55%
060614017	Carawisan II	1.6%	567	514	▴	0.68%
060614018	Carmelo I	1.3%	485	419	▴	1.02%
060614019	Carmelo II	1.1%	392	370	▴	0.40%
060614020	General Fullon	1.7%	630	613	▴	0.19%
060614021	General Luna	1.9%	672	603	▴	0.75%
060614023	Iguirindon	3.1%	1,117	1,064	▴	0.34%
060614024	Insubuan	0.8%	299	280	▴	0.46%
060614025	La Union	1.7%	629	504	▴	1.55%
060614026	Lapak	1.2%	427	425	▴	0.03%
060614027	Lumpatan	1.8%	646	602	▴	0.49%
060614028	Magdalena	1.8%	637	615	▴	0.24%
060614029	Maragubdub	1.9%	692	678	▴	0.14%
060614030	Nagbangi I (Amatong)	1.8%	664	700	▾	−0.37%
060614031	Nagbangi II	1.4%	491	484	▴	0.10%
060614033	Nasuli	1.4%	502	473	▴	0.41%
060614022	Orquia (Igcatumbal)	0.6%	218	207	▴	0.36%
060614034	Osorio I	2.1%	757	717	▴	0.38%
060614035	Osorio II	2.4%	865	843	▴	0.18%
060614036	Panpanan I	3.6%	1,302	1,350	▾	−0.25%
060614037	Panpanan II	1.3%	475	494	▾	−0.27%
060614015	Poblacion (Calag-itan)	5.1%	1,836	1,670	▴	0.66%
060614039	Ramon Magsaysay	1.9%	701	647	▴	0.56%
060614040	Rizal	0.8%	280	273	▴	0.18%
060614041	San Rafael	3.4%	1,228	1,187	▴	0.24%
060614042	Sinundolan	5.2%	1,875	1,856	▴	0.07%
060614043	Sumaray	1.4%	497	345	▴	2.57%
060614044	Trinidad	3.0%	1,092	1,056	▴	0.23%
060614045	Tubudan	1.7%	610	459	▴	1.99%
060614046	Vilvar	1.3%	477	446	▴	0.47%
060614047	Walker	3.0%	1,102	1,087	▴	0.10%
	Total		36,170	30,446	▴	1.20%

=== Climate ===
Climate data for San Remigio, Antique
Month	Jan	Feb	Mar	Apr	May	Jun	Jul	Aug	Sep	Oct	Nov	Dec	Year
Mean daily maximum °C (°F)	30 (86)	31 (88)	32 (90)	33 (91)	32 (90)	30 (86)	29 (84)	28 (82)	28 (82)	29 (84)	29 (84)	30 (86)	30 (86)
Mean daily minimum °C (°F)	21 (70)	21 (70)	21 (70)	23 (73)	24 (75)	24 (75)	24 (75)	24 (75)	24 (75)	23 (73)	22 (72)	21 (70)	23 (73)
Average precipitation mm (inches)	19 (0.7)	17 (0.7)	26 (1.0)	37 (1.5)	119 (4.7)	191 (7.5)	258 (10.2)	260 (10.2)	248 (9.8)	196 (7.7)	97 (3.8)	39 (1.5)	1,507 (59.3)
Average rainy days	7.2	5.2	8.3	11.9	22.3	26.5	28.3	28.2	27.3	26.4	18.7	11.8	222.1
Source: Meteoblue

== Demographics ==
Population census of San Remigio
Year	Pop.	±% p.a.
1903	4,361	—
1918	6,241	+2.42%
1939	10,035	+2.29%
1948	11,536	+1.56%
1960	13,293	+1.19%
1970	16,567	+2.22%
1975	17,134	+0.68%
1980	19,208	+2.31%
1990	21,682	+1.22%
1995	22,869	+1.00%
2000	26,079	+2.86%
2007	28,401	+1.18%
2010	30,446	+2.56%
2015	31,935	+0.91%
2020	34,045	+1.36%
2024	36,170	+1.46%
Source: Philippine Statistics Authority

In the 2024 census, San Remigio had a population of 36,170. The population density was 89 inhabitants per square kilometre (230/sq mi).

== Economy ==
Poverty incidence of San Remigio (%)

Source: Philippine Statistics Authority

The municipality of San Remigio produced a total of 13,074.02 metric tons of palay in an area of 41.87 square kilometres (16.17 sq mi) of which only 22.00% are irrigated and the rest are rain fed and upland area.

San Remigio has a road network of 187.452 kilometres (116.477 mi). Based on administrative classification, 42.696 kilometres (26.530 mi) are municipal roads and 136.124 kilometres (84.584 mi) are barangay roads. There are eleven bridges in the municipality with a total length of 321.391 kilometres (199.703 mi).

One major contributor to the economic activity of the town is the remittances of the overseas contract workers.

== Tourism ==
=== Natural attractions ===
San Remigio is host to natural attractions like the Igbaclag Cave, Bato Cueva, Kanyugan Cave, Magpungay Cave, Pula Falls, Timbaban Falls and Batuan Falls, the lakes of Maylumboy and Danao, the stone of Datu Sumakwel, Bato Bintana and White Castle Stone, and the mountain ranges of San Remigio. The rivers are rich with gem stones and the biggest flower Rafflesia can be seen in the upland barangays of Tubudan and La Union.

== Culture ==
=== Religious pilgrimage ===
Every April thousands of people from Antique and nearby provinces go to the Diocesan Shrine of St. Vincent Ferrer of the Iglesia Filipina Independiente in Barangay Baladjay. From April 1 until the last Sunday of April, which is the celebration of its feast day, masses are offered daily.

== Education ==
There are two schools district offices which govern all educational institutions within the municipality. They oversee the management and operations of all private and public, from primary to secondary schools. These are the:

- San Remigio I Schools District
- San Remigio II Schools District

=== Primary and elementary schools ===
- Agricula Elementary School
- Alegria Elementary School
- Aningalan Elementary School
- Atabay Primary School
- Bagumbayan Elementary School
- Banbanan Elementary School
- Barangbang Elementary School
- Bawang Elementary School
- Bugo Central School
- Bulan-Bulan Elementary School
- Cabiawan Elementary School
- Cabunga-an Elementary School
- Cacao Primary School
- Cadolonan Elementary School
- Calag-itan Central School
- Carawisan Elementary School
- Carmelo I Elementary School
- Carmelo II Elementary School
- General Fullon Elementary School
- General Luna Elementary School
- Gideon M. Cabigunda MS
- Iguirindon Elementary School
- Insubuan Elementary School
- La Union Elementary School
- Lapak Elementary School
- Magdalena Elementary School
- Mayor Antonio MS (Lumpatan Elementary School)
- Maragubdub Elementary School
- Nagbangi I Elementary School
- Nagbangi II Elementary School
- Orquia Primary School
- Osorio I Elementary School
- Osorio II Elementary School
- Panpanan I Elementary School
- Panpanan II Primary School
- Ramon Magsaysay Elementary School
- Rizal Elementary School
- San Rafael Elementary School
- San Remigio Elementary School
- Sinondolan Elementary School
- Sumaray Elementary School
- Trinidad Elementary School
- Tubudan Elementary School
- Walker-Libodon Elementary School
- Walker-Proper Elementary School

=== Secondary schools ===
- Barangbang National High School
- Gov. Evelio B. Javier Memorial National High School
- St. Vincent's High School
