= Libacao =

Municipality in Aklan, Philippines

- Municipality
- Municipality of Libacao
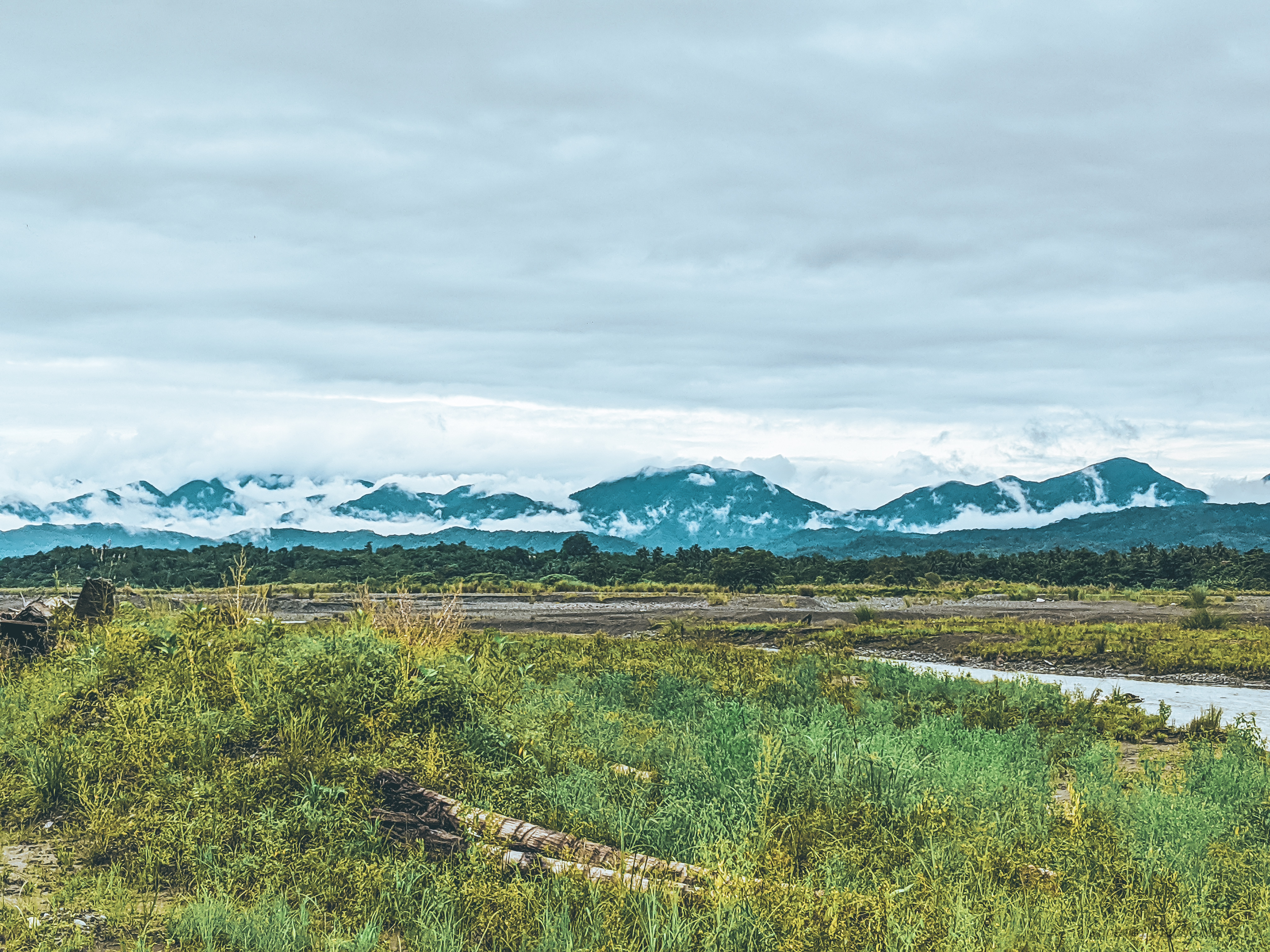

- Flag Seal
- Interactive map of Libacao
- Location within the Philippines
- Coordinates: 11°29′N 122°18′E
- Country: Philippines
- Region: Western Visayas
- Province: Aklan
- District: 1st district
- Barangays: 24 (see Barangays)

Government
  - Type: Sangguniang Bayan
  - Mayor: Bagto
  - Vice Mayor: Vincent I. Navarosa
  - Representative: Carlito S. Marquez
  - Municipal Council: Members: John Randy P. Zapata; Getulio M. Esto; Mila A. Lanciso; Teodoro N. Villorente Jr.; Robert Z. Navarrete; Napoleon N. Navarosa; Danilo Z. Zorilla; Bennette D. Teodosio
  - Electorate: 19,518 voters (2025)

Area
  - Total: 254.98 km^{2} (98.45 sq mi)
- Elevation: 410 m (1,350 ft)
- Highest elevation: 2,088 m (6,850 ft)
- Lowest elevation: 0 m (0 ft)

Population (2024 census)
  - Total: 28,525
  - Density: 111.87/km^{2} (289.75/sq mi)
  - Households: 7,086

Economy
  - Income class: 2nd municipal income class
  - Poverty incidence: 19.95% (2023)
  - Revenue: ₱ 186.1 million (2024)
  - Assets: ₱ 978.8 million (2024)
  - Expenditure: ₱ 138 million (2024)
  - Liabilities: ₱ 264.3 million (2024)

Service provider
  - Electricity: Aklan Electric Cooperative (AKELCO)
- Time zone: UTC+8 (PST)
- ZIP code: 5602
- PSGC: 060409000
- IDD : area code: +63 (0)36
- Native languages: Aklanon; Hiligaynon; Capisnon; Tagalog

Libacao, officially the Municipality of Libacao (Aklanon: Banwa it Libacao; Hiligaynon: Banwa sang Libacao; Tagalog: Bayan ng Libacao), is a municipality in the province of Aklan, Philippines. According to the 2024 census, it has a population of 28,525 people.

The town has the highest output in production of abaca fiber in Western Visayas among other towns in the province of Aklan.

== History ==
In 1948, the arrabal of Madalag was separated from Libacao and constituted as a separate town, with the following barrios: Logohon, Singay, Balactasan, Cabangahan, Cabilawan, Pangitan, San Jose, Talimagao, Talangban, Alaminos, Catabana, Bakyang, Calicia, Mercedes, Maria Cristina, Dit-ana, Guinato-an, Tigbauan, Alas-as, Mamba, Medina, Panipiason, and Paningayan.

== Geography ==
Libacao is located at 11°29′N 122°18′E. It is 31 kilometres (19 mi) from the provincial capital Kalibo.

According to the Philippine Statistics Authority, the municipality has a land area of 254.98 square kilometres (98.45 sq mi) constituting 14.00% of the 1,821.42-square-kilometre- (703.25 sq mi) total area of Aklan.

=== Climate ===
Climate data for Libacao, Aklan
Month	Jan	Feb	Mar	Apr	May	Jun	Jul	Aug	Sep	Oct	Nov	Dec	Year
Mean daily maximum °C (°F)	28 (82)	29 (84)	31 (88)	32 (90)	31 (88)	30 (86)	30 (86)	29 (84)	29 (84)	29 (84)	29 (84)	28 (82)	30 (85)
Mean daily minimum °C (°F)	22 (72)	22 (72)	22 (72)	23 (73)	25 (77)	25 (77)	25 (77)	25 (77)	25 (77)	24 (75)	23 (73)	23 (73)	24 (75)
Average precipitation mm (inches)	64 (2.5)	44 (1.7)	58 (2.3)	83 (3.3)	204 (8.0)	304 (12.0)	334 (13.1)	291 (11.5)	310 (12.2)	281 (11.1)	172 (6.8)	97 (3.8)	2,242 (88.3)
Average rainy days	12.5	8.9	11.3	14.1	24.2	28.0	29.6	28.2	28.1	28.1	20.2	15.2	248.4
Source: Meteoblue

=== Barangays ===
Libacao is politically subdivided into 24 barangays.However, there are boundaries issues with the municipalities of Jamindan and Tapaz, Capiz. The location of Brgy Dalagsa-an and Sitio Taroytoy (of Brgy Manika) are geographically located with in the Territorial Jurisdiction of Jamindan, Capiz and Sitio Maytaraw (of Brgy Dalagsa-an) is located in the Territorial Jurisdiction of Tapaz, Capiz. Each barangay consists of puroks and some have sitios.

PSGC	Barangay	Population			±% p.a.	
		2024		2010		
060409001	Agmailig	2.6%	736	755	▾	−0.18%
060409002	Alfonso XII	4.7%	1,331	1,323	▴	0.04%
060409003	Batobato	1.8%	501	453	▴	0.70%
060409004	Bonza	1.4%	395	333	▴	1.19%
060409005	Calacabian	3.0%	865	932	▾	−0.52%
060409006	Calamcan	2.2%	620	613	▴	0.08%
060409007	Can-Awan	1.7%	487	542	▾	−0.74%
060409008	Casit-an	1.2%	352	342	▴	0.20%
060409009	Dalagsa-an	6.7%	1,908	2,173	▾	−0.90%
060409010	Guadalupe	5.4%	1,529	1,412	▴	0.55%
060409011	Janlud	3.5%	1,011	740	▴	2.19%
060409012	Julita	6.9%	1,971	1,763	▴	0.78%
060409013	Luctoga	5.1%	1,442	1,451	▾	−0.04%
060409014	Magugba	2.1%	600	644	▾	−0.49%
060409015	Manika	7.3%	2,091	2,622	▾	−1.56%
060409016	Ogsip	3.2%	920	1,066	▾	−1.02%
060409017	Ortega	4.4%	1,248	1,309	▾	−0.33%
060409018	Oyang	3.7%	1,068	1,028	▴	0.27%
060409019	Pampango	5.1%	1,455	1,360	▴	0.47%
060409020	Pinonoy	2.5%	727	708	▴	0.18%
060409021	Poblacion	14.1%	4,010	3,661	▴	0.63%
060409022	Rivera	2.3%	648	596	▴	0.58%
060409023	Rosal	5.6%	1,591	1,476	▴	0.52%
060409024	Sibalew	2.6%	735	703	▴	0.31%
	Total		28,525	28,005	▴	0.13%

== Demographics ==
Population census of Libacao
Year	Pop.	±% p.a.
1903	4,876	—
1918	17,125	+8.74%
1939	20,253	+0.80%
1948	13,523	−4.39%
1960	14,913	+0.82%
1970	15,837	+0.60%
1975	20,243	+5.05%
1980	21,683	+1.38%
1990	21,429	−0.12%
1995	22,812	+1.18%
2000	25,983	+2.83%
2007	26,610	+0.33%
2010	28,005	+1.88%
2015	28,241	+0.16%
2020	28,272	+0.02%
2024	28,525	+0.21%
Source: Philippine Statistics Authority

In the 2024 census, Libacao had a population of 28,525 people. The population density was 110 inhabitants per square kilometre (280/sq mi).

== Economy ==
Poverty incidence of Libacao (%)

Source: Philippine Statistics Authority

The municipality produces Coconut as the town has a lot of mountains and plains which are suitable for growing coconut trees. Abaca fiber is also another product that Libacaonons produce.

== Tourism ==
The Nasuraan Falls and Kaeabnakan Falls are located in the remote barangay of Oyang. Nasuraan Falls is a 30 minutes ride and an hour trek from the main sitio. Mangayaw Falls is located at Sitio Mayubay in Barangay Guadalupe, considered the nearest falls from Poblacion with no entrance fee for visitors.

The Taroytoy is eyed to be the Summer Capital of Central Philippines.

Philippine Spotted Deer is a nocturnal and endangered species of deer located primarily in the rainforests of the Visayan islands of Panay and Negros though it once roamed other islands such as Cebu, Guimaras, Leyte, Masbate, and Samar.

The Libacao Wild River is longest Wild River in the Philippines.

Bamboo Raft Parade (BAESA PARADA) is a bamboo cruise parade along the Aklan river showcasing the local lifestyle, livelihood, culture, and products of the town.

== Education ==
The Libacao Schools District Office governs all educational institutions within the municipality. It oversees the management and operations of all private and public, from primary to secondary schools.

=== Primary and elementary schools ===
- Agbatuan Elementary School (Agbatuan (Primary School)
- Agmailig Elementary School
- Alfonso XII Elementary School
- Batobato Primary School
- Belen Primary School
- Bonza Primary School
- Bueosangay Primary School
- Calacabian Elementary School
- Calamcan Elementary School
- Casit-an Primary School
- Christ the King School
- Guadalupe Elementary School
- Janlud Elementary School
- Julita Elementary School
- Libacao Central Elementary School
- Libacao Christian Learning Center
- Loctuga Elementary School
- Magugba Primary School
- Manika Elementary School
- Marapayao Primary School
- Maytaraw Primary School
- Ogsip Primary School
- Oyang Primary School
- Pampango Elementary School
- Pinonoy Primary School
- Rivera Primary School
- Rosal Elementary School
- Sibalew Primary School
- St. Catherine of Alexandria Catholic School
- Taroytoy Elementary School (Tarotoy Primary School)

=== Secondary schools ===
- Alfonso XII National High School
- Dalagsaan Integrated School
- Guadalupe National High School
- Libacao National Forestry Vocational High School
- Loctuga National High School
- Ortega Integrated School
