= Valderrama, Antique =

Municipality in Antique, Philippines

Valderrama
- Municipality
- Municipality of Valderrama
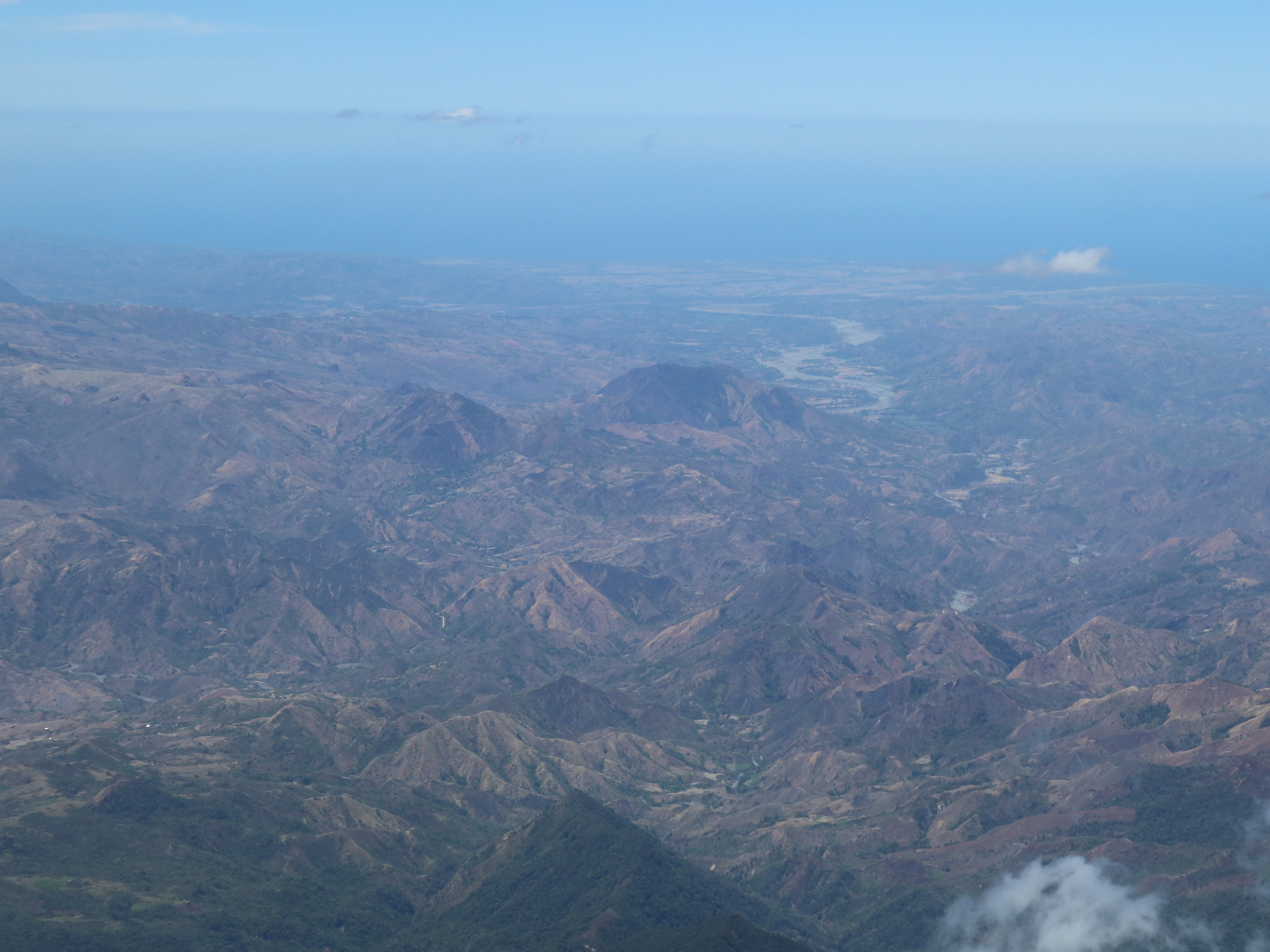

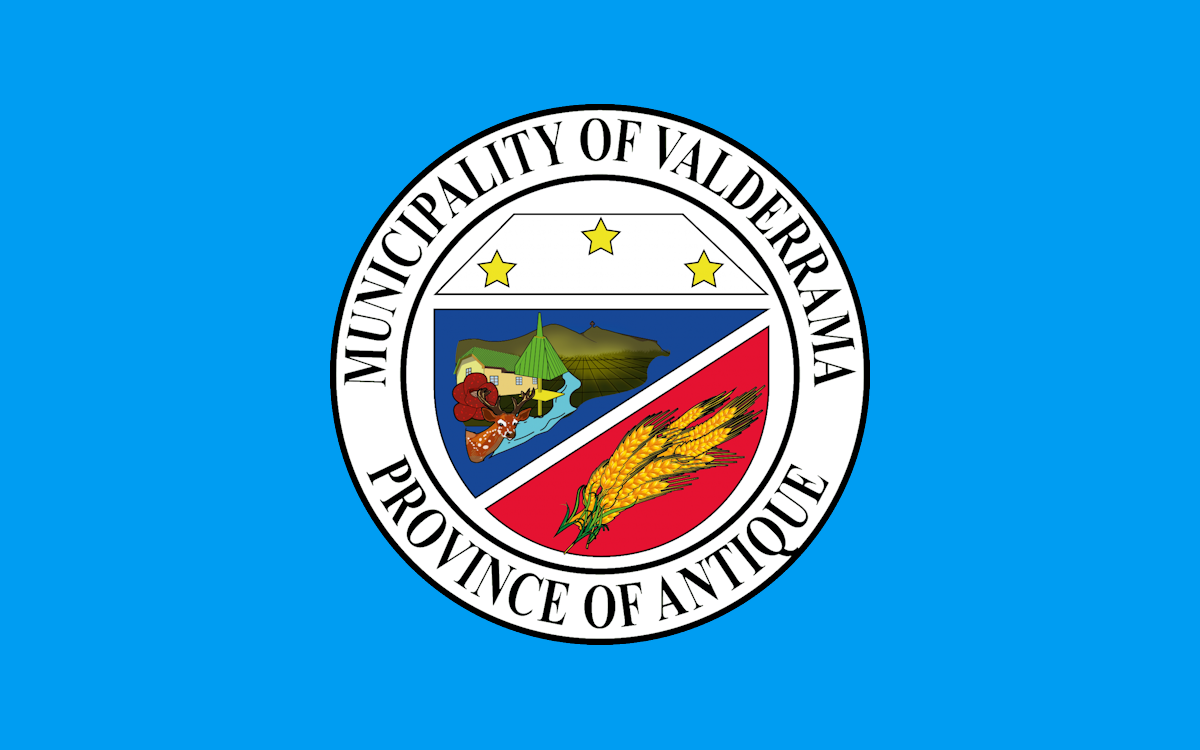
- Flag

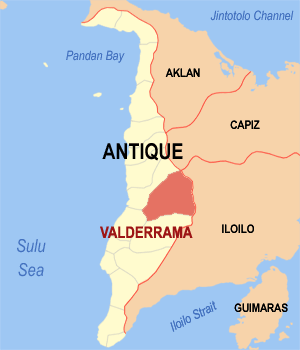
- Map of Antique with Valderrama highlighted
- Interactive map of Valderrama
- Location within the Philippines
- Coordinates: 11°00′13″N 122°07′46″E
- Country: Philippines
- Region: Western Visayas
- Province: Antique
- District: Lone district
- Founded: 1865
- Named for: Manuel Blanco Valderrama
- Barangays: 22 (see Barangays)

Government
  - Type: Sangguniang Bayan
  - Mayor: Jocelyn L. Posadas
  - Vice Mayor: Christopher B. Maguad
  - Representative: Anthony Agapito B. Legarda Jr.
  - Municipal Council: Members: Mark Alvin C. Bingco; John Vincent J. Bingco; Pedro P. Labanon; Josefino Q. Castillon; Luisito B. Bayog; Luisito B. Bayog; May Jacqueline P. Otadoy; Jose Mervin T. Gonzales
  - Electorate: 14,530 voters (2025)

Area
  - Total: 273.79 km^{2} (105.71 sq mi)
- Elevation: 479 m (1,572 ft)
- Highest elevation (Mount Baloy): 1,960 m (6,430 ft)
- Lowest elevation: 25 m (82 ft)

Population (2024 census)
  - Total: 20,762
  - Density: 75.832/km^{2} (196.40/sq mi)
  - Households: 4,750

Economy
  - Income class: 2nd municipal income class
  - Poverty incidence: 28.1% (2023)
  - Revenue: ₱ 176.5 million (2024)
  - Assets: ₱ 414.4 million (2024)
  - Expenditure: ₱ 96.47 million (2024)
  - Liabilities: ₱ 88.03 million (2024)

Service provider
  - Electricity: Antique Electric Cooperative (ANTECO)
- Time zone: UTC+8 (PST)
- ZIP code: 5703
- PSGC: 060618000
- IDD : area code: +63 (0)36
- Native languages: Karay-a; Sulod; Hiligaynon; Tagalog
- Website: valderramaantique.gov.ph

Valderrama, officially the Municipality of Valderrama (Kinaray-a: Banwa kang Valderrama; Hiligaynon: Banwa sang Valderrama; Tagalog: Bayan ng Valderrama), is a municipality in the province of Antique, Philippines. According to the 2024 census, it has a population of 20,762 people. It is the second largest municipality in terms of land area, with a total area of 273.79 square kilometers.

It is a lively town in the province of Antique, known for its strong culture and natural charm. It is home to the Panubason Festival, a celebration of local harvest and traditions. The town highlights its clean rivers, mountain views, and active community life, making it a bright spot in the upland area of the province.

== Etymology ==
The municipality was named after Spanish captain-general (governor) ad interim Manuel Blanco de Valderrama.

== History ==
In 1865, when Caberi-an became a separate town after the work of a Spanish official named Manuel Blanco Valderrama. The people showed their gratitude by giving honor to his surname as the new pueblo Valderrama. He later rose in rank and served as interim Governor General of the Philippines from 1873 to 1874.

== Geography ==
Valderrama is 53 kilometres (33 mi) from the provincial capital, San Jose de Buenavista.

According to the Philippine Statistics Authority, the municipality has a land area of 273.79 square kilometres (105.71 sq mi) constituting 10.03% of the 2,729.17-square-kilometre- (1,053.74 sq mi) total area of Antique.

=== Barangays ===
Valderrama is politically subdivided into 22 barangays. Each barangay consists of puroks and some have sitios.

PSGC	Barangay	Population			±% p.a.	
		2024		2010		
060618022	Alon	1.1%	222	219	▴	0.09%
060618001	Bakiang	2.8%	588	569	▴	0.23%
060618002	Binanogan	3.2%	673	534	▴	1.62%
060618003	Borocboroc	3.9%	820	840	▾	−0.17%
060618004	Bugnay	4.6%	953	936	▴	0.12%
060618005	Buluangan I	8.7%	1,800	1,563	▴	0.98%
060618006	Buluangan II	2.3%	479	463	▴	0.24%
060618007	Bunsod	3.7%	772	779	▾	−0.06%
060618008	Busog	1.2%	259	255	▴	0.11%
060618009	Cananghan	1.3%	274	265	▴	0.23%
060618010	Canipayan	2.8%	587	579	▴	0.10%
060618011	Cansilayan	1.3%	269	268	▴	0.03%
060618012	Culyat	0.8%	162	149	▴	0.58%
060618013	Iglinab	4.5%	925	884	▴	0.32%
060618014	Igmasandig	1.3%	273	271	▴	0.05%
060618015	Lublub	4.8%	991	1,016	▾	−0.17%
060618016	Manlacbo	5.3%	1,092	1,040	▴	0.34%
060618017	Pandanan	9.6%	1,993	1,809	▴	0.67%
060618018	San Agustin	5.9%	1,232	1,310	▾	−0.43%
060618019	Takas (Poblacion)	9.0%	1,878	1,869	▴	0.03%
060618020	Tigmamale	4.2%	871	851	▴	0.16%
060618021	Ubos (Poblacion)	9.7%	2,011	1,973	▴	0.13%
	Total		20,762	18,442	▴	0.83%

=== Climate ===
Climate data for Valderrama, Antique
Month	Jan	Feb	Mar	Apr	May	Jun	Jul	Aug	Sep	Oct	Nov	Dec	Year
Mean daily maximum °C (°F)	28 (82)	30 (86)	31 (88)	33 (91)	32 (90)	30 (86)	29 (84)	29 (84)	29 (84)	29 (84)	29 (84)	29 (84)	30 (86)
Mean daily minimum °C (°F)	22 (72)	22 (72)	22 (72)	24 (75)	25 (77)	25 (77)	25 (77)	25 (77)	25 (77)	24 (75)	24 (75)	23 (73)	24 (75)
Average precipitation mm (inches)	64 (2.5)	44 (1.7)	58 (2.3)	83 (3.3)	204 (8.0)	304 (12.0)	334 (13.1)	291 (11.5)	310 (12.2)	281 (11.1)	172 (6.8)	97 (3.8)	2,242 (88.3)
Average rainy days	12.5	8.9	11.3	14.1	24.2	28.0	29.6	28.2	28.1	28.1	20.2	15.2	248.4
Source: Meteoblue (modeled/calculated data, not measured locally)

=== Land ===
The rice terraces of the Iraynun-Bukidnon are divided into three terraced fields, namely, Lublub rice terraces, Baking rice terraces, and San Agustin rice terraces. All of the rice terrace clusters have been researched on by the National Commission for Culture and the Arts and various scholars from the University of the Philippines. There have been campaigns to nominate the Iraynun-Bukidnon Rice Terraces, along with the central Panay mountain range, into the UNESCO World Heritage List.

== Demographics ==
Population census of Valderrama

Year	Pop.	±% p.a.
1903	4,885	—
1918	5,424	+0.70%
1939	7,742	+1.71%
1948	9,388	+2.17%
1960	8,683	−0.65%
1970	9,821	+1.24%
1975	11,936	+3.99%
1980	12,968	+1.67%

Year	Pop.	±% p.a.
1990	14,197	+0.91%
1995	15,433	+1.58%
2000	17,874	+3.20%
2007	18,878	+0.76%
2010	18,442	−0.85%
2015	19,124	+0.69%
2020	19,971	+0.92%
2024	20,762	+0.94%

Source: Philippine Statistics Authority

In the 2024 census, Valderrama had a population of 20,762 people. The population density was 76 inhabitants per square kilometre (200/sq mi).

=== Language ===
The area is home to the indigenous Iraynun-Bukidnon, speakers of a dialect of the Kiniray-a language, who have crafted the only rice terrace clusters in the Visayas through indigenous knowledge and sheer vernacular capabilities.

== Economy ==
Poverty incidence of Valderrama (%)

Source: Philippine Statistics Authority

== Government ==
The newly-elected Mayor Jocelyn Posadas took her oath on June 21, 2016, after winning the elections May 9, 2016. The new set of the municipality's government officials are Josefino Castillón as Vice Mayor and 8 Sangguniang Bayan (SB) Members: Richel Pagayônan, Pedro Labánon, Jose Mervin Gonzales, Keking Otadoy, Mary Joyce Roquero, Christopher Maguad, Anthony Gade and Budak Pon-an.

== Education ==
The Valderrama Schools District Office governs all educational institutions within the municipality. It oversees the management and operations of all private and public, from primary to secondary schools.

=== Primary and elementary schools ===
- Alon Primary School
- Bakiang Elementary School
- Binanogan Elementary School
- Borocboroc Elementary School
- Bugnay Elementary School
- Buluangan I Elementary School
- Buluangan II Elementary School
- Bunsod Elementary School
- Busog Primary School
- Cananghan Primary School
- Canipayan Elementary School
- Cansilayan Elementary School
- Culyat Primary School
- Iglinab Elementary School
- Igmasandig Primary School
- Lublub Elementary School
- Manlacbo Elementary School
- Pandanan Elementary School
- San Agustin Elementary School
- St. Luke Parochial Kindergarten School
- Tigmamale Elementary School
- Valderama Central Elementary School

=== Secondary schools ===
- St. Luke's Academy
- Valderrama National High School
