= Cebuano people =

Ethnolinguistic group of the Philippines

Katawhang Sugbuanon
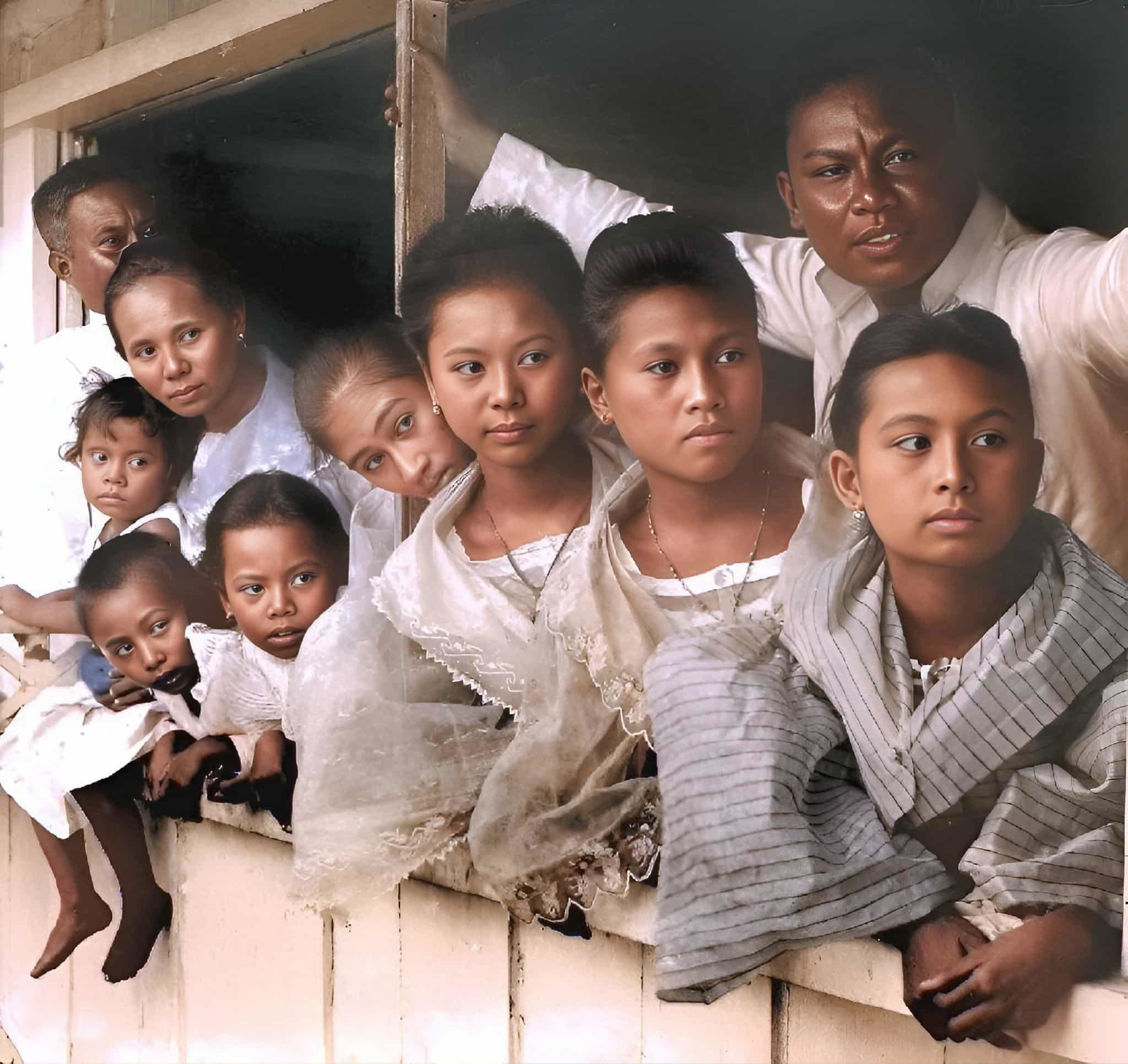
- Cebuano family early 1900's.

Total population
- 24,206,520 (2020)

Regions with significant populations
- Philippines (Central Visayas, Negros Oriental, Masbate, western parts of Eastern Visayas, and almost all parts of Mindanao) Significant diaspora in: United States; Canada; Australia; United Kingdom; New Zealand; Singapore United Arab Emirates

Languages
- Native; Cebuano; Also; Hiligaynon, Waray, Filipino, English

Religion
- Predominantly; Christianity (majority Roman Catholicism • minority Aglipayan , Protestantism); Historically; Hinduism

Related ethnic groups
- Other Visayan peoples; (Hiligaynon; Boholano; Masbateño; Waray; Butuanon; Aklanon; Surigaonon; Capiznon; Cuyonon; Ratagnon; Karay-a; Romblomanon; Suludnon); Other Austronesian peoples

The Cebuano people (Cebuano: Sugboanon) are the largest subgroup of the larger ethnolinguistic group Visayans. They originate from the region of Central Visayas, including Cebu, Siquijor, Bohol, Negros Oriental, western and southern Leyte, western Samar, Masbate, and large parts of Mindanao.

In general, "Cebuano" is a demonym that refers to the native speakers of the Cebuano language in various regions in the Philippine archipelago. In the narrower definition, Cebuano (Cebuano: Sugbuanon) refers to the native inhabitants of Cebu Island.

== History ==
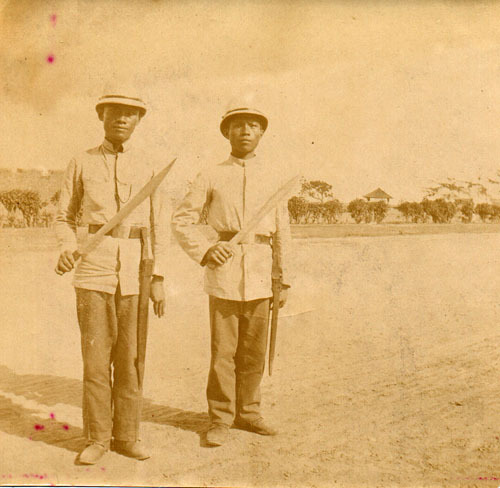
Cebuano men who served as guards in the early 20th century during the American period.

The earliest European record of Cebuanos was by Antonio Pigafetta of the Magellan expedition. He provided some descriptions of their customs as well as samples of the Cebuano language. Ferdinand Magellan was killed in Cebu during the Battle of Mactan against the forces of Lapulapu.

Later early Spanish colonists referred to the Cebuanos (and other Visayans) as the pintados ("the painted ones"), due to their widespread practice of tattooing to record battle exploits.

They are crucial for being part of the 300 Visayans that conquered the Island of Luzon, and especially Manila with Spanish Empire together with 90 Spaniards. They are also a crucial part of the native middleman for the trade between China and Spain. For the early years of the Spanish era in the Philippines.

Cebuanos have migrated for centuries, with the most significant waves occurring during the early to mid-20th century due to economic hardship, displacement, and government-sponsored resettlement programs that encouraged settlement in Mindanao.

Cebuano migration to Mindanao accelerated in the 1930s and 1950s due to economic unrest in the Visayas and government-sponsored land settlement programs, making Cebuano the dominant language in many parts of Mindanao. Migrants often moved in groups from their home towns, bringing their language and culture with them. This influx of Cebuano speakers, alongside migrations from other Visayan islands like Bohol and Panay, led to the widespread adoption of Cebuano as the lingua franca across Mindanao.

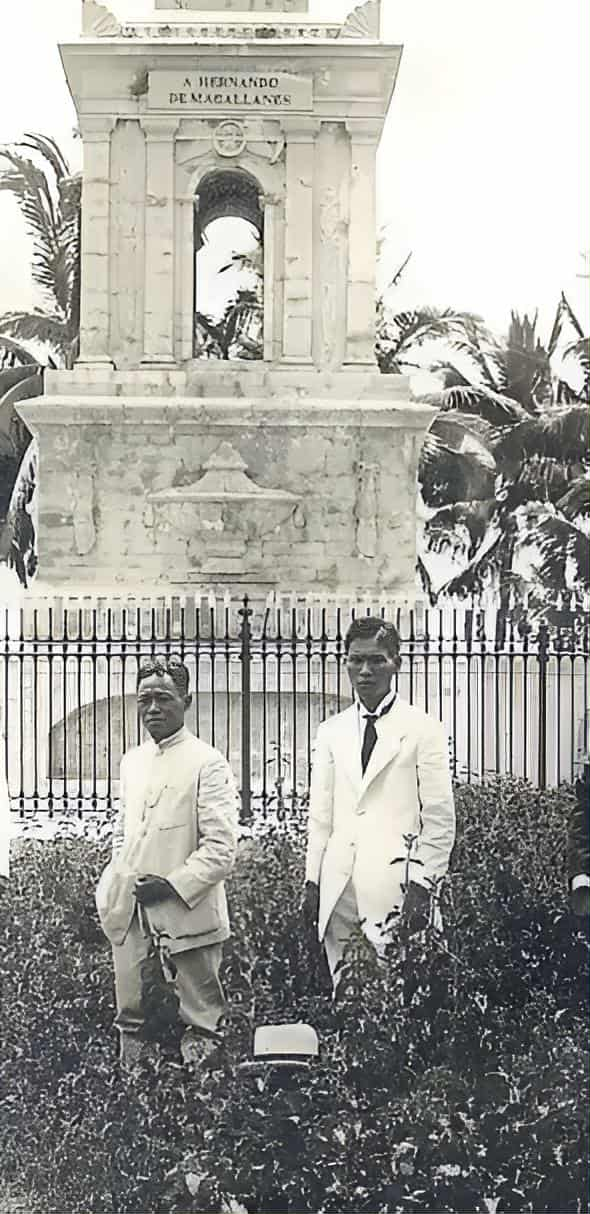
Two locals of Cebu posing near Magellan shrine.

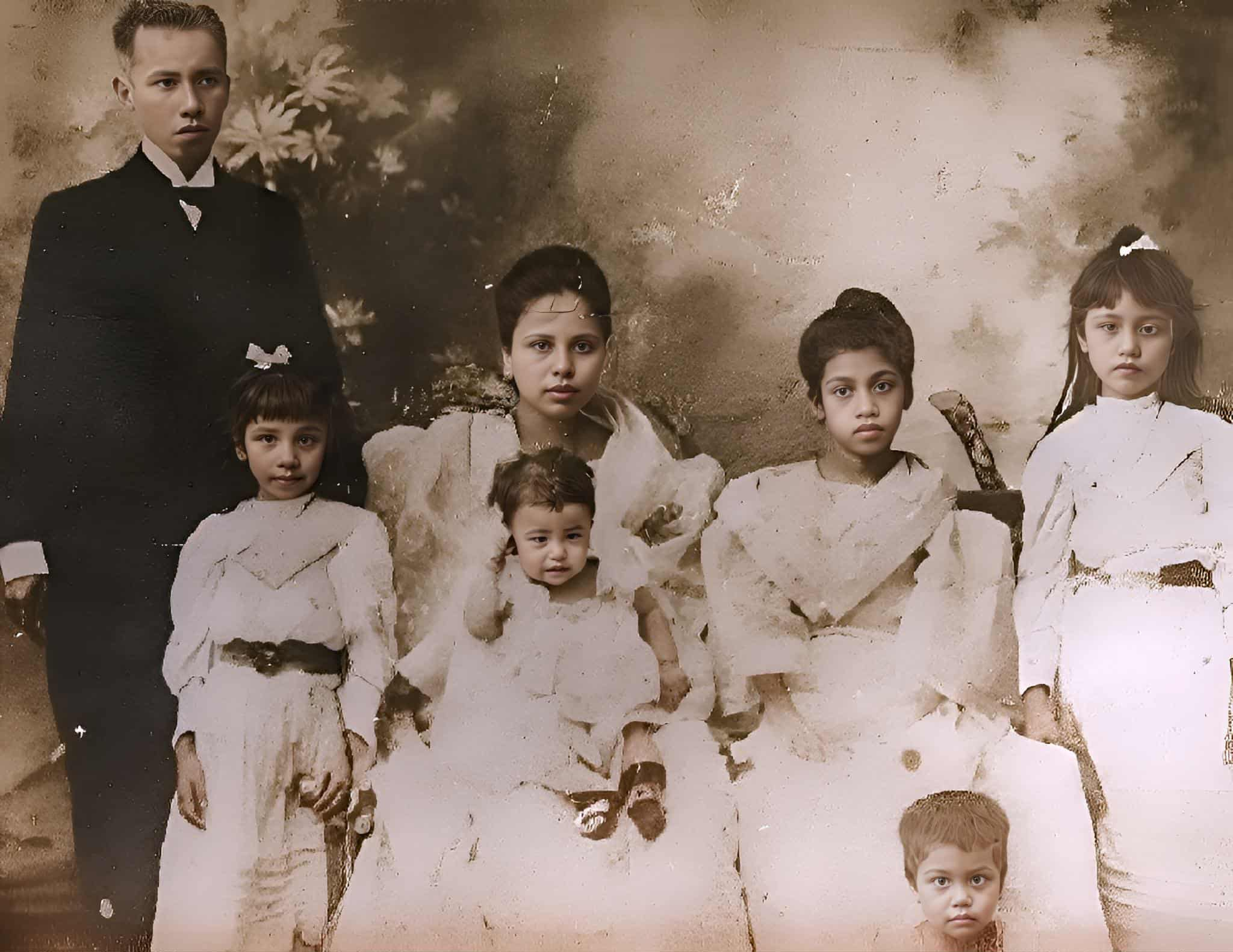
The Cebuano, Dr. Espina family 1900's

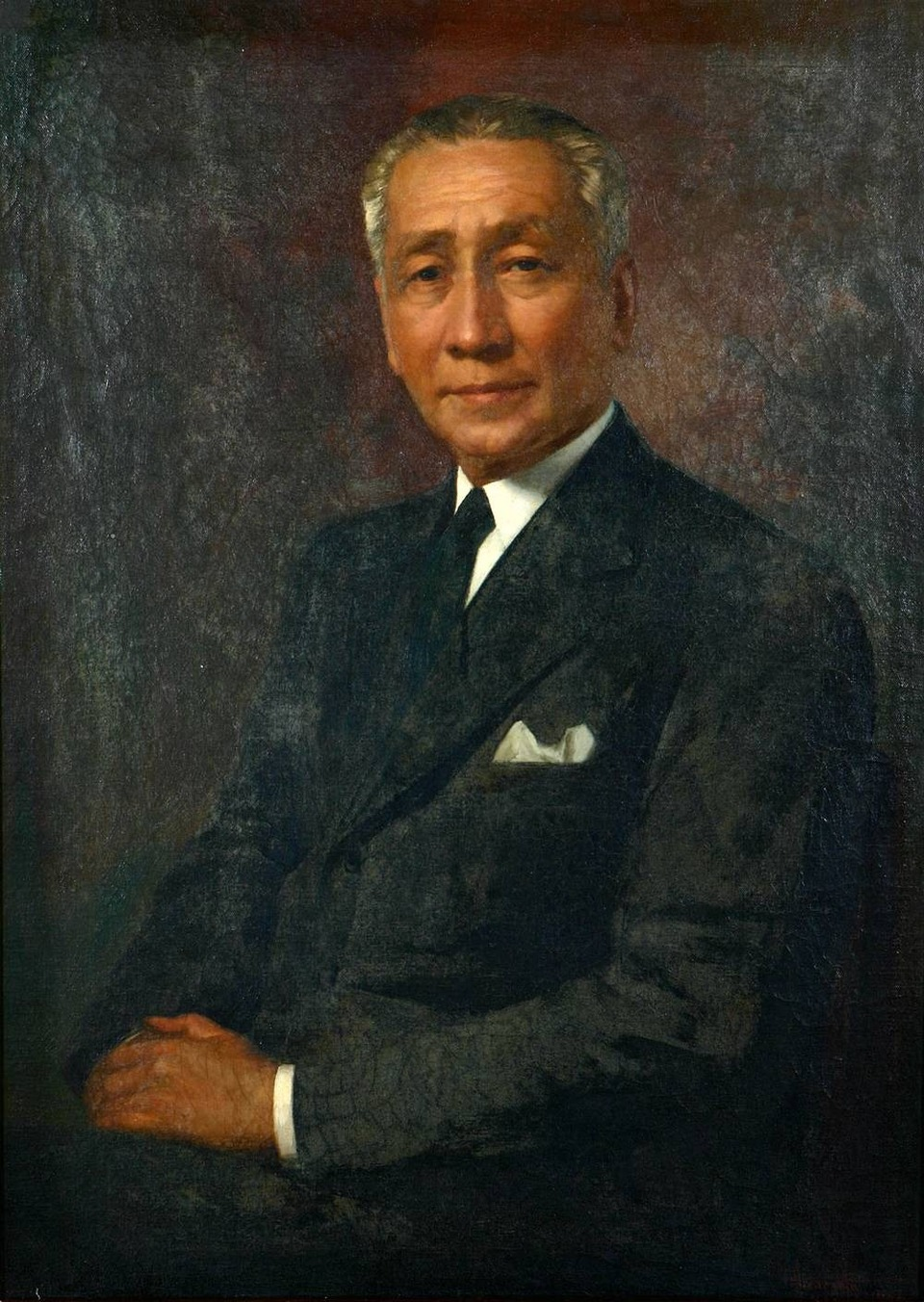
Sergio Osmeña the Fourth President of the Philippines.

== Culture and festivities ==
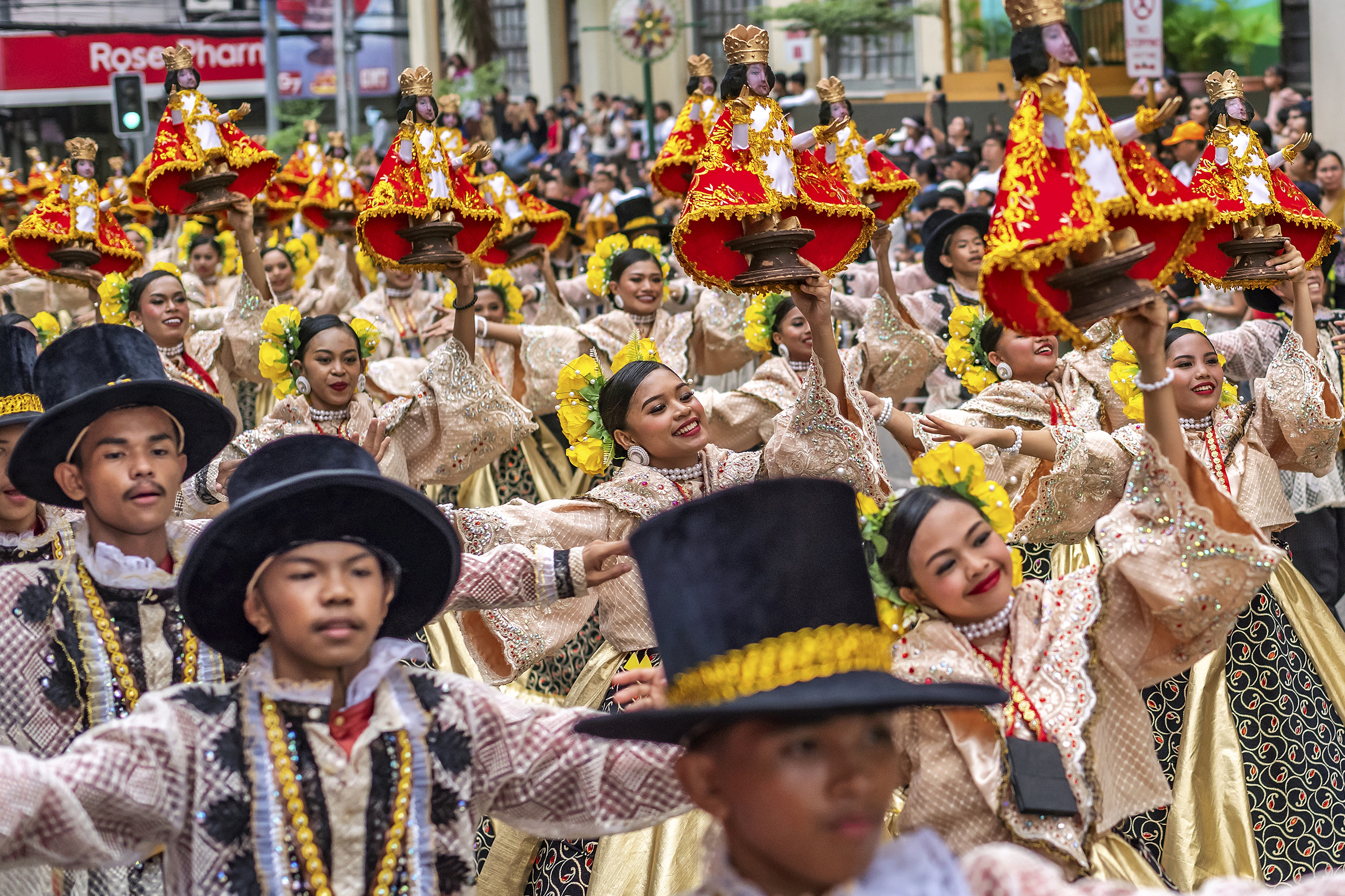
The Sinulog Festival, which is held annually on the third Sunday of January in Cebu City.

Part of the dominant culture in the Philippines known as the Lowland Christians. Known to be the first Filipinos to convert to Christianity, the majority of Cebuanos are Roman Catholic, with many in rural areas synchronizing Catholicism with indigenous Bisayan folk religion. A minority of Cebuanos (specifically those in Mindanao) are Roman Catholic, or in mixed Chinese-Cebuano families, incorporate Catholic beliefs with aspects of Buddhism or Taoism.

Among the island's notable festivities are the Sinulog festival, which is a mixture of Christian and native cultural elements, celebrated annually every third week of January.

== Language ==
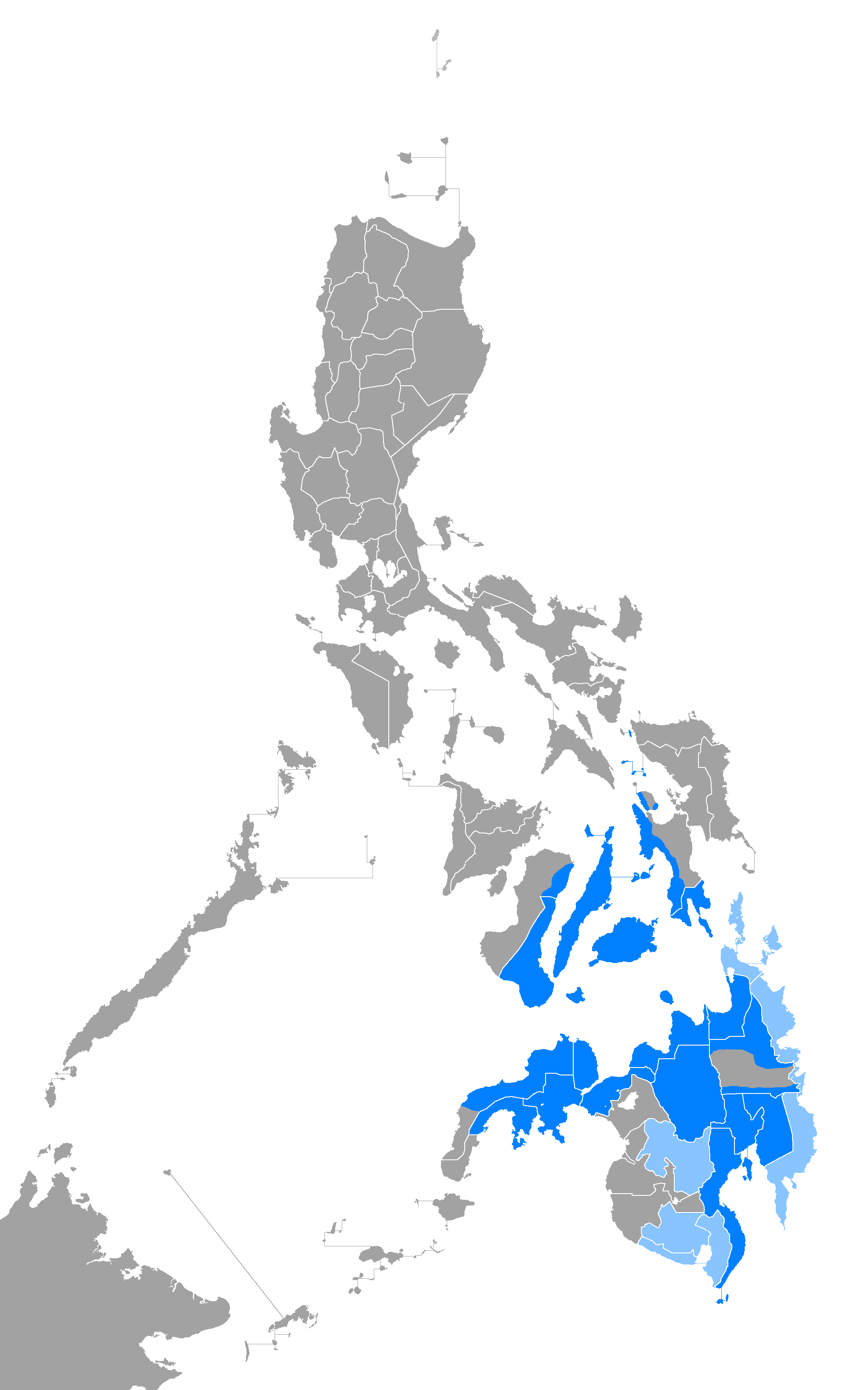
Map of the distribution Cebuano people.

The Cebuano language is spoken by more than twenty million people in the Philippines and is the most widely spoken of the Visayan languages. Most speakers of Cebuano are found in Cebu, Bohol, Siquijor, southeastern Masbate, Biliran, Western and Southern Leyte, eastern Negros and most of Mindanao except Bangsamoro Autonomous Region in Muslim Mindanao. Like with other Filipino ethnolinguistic groups, Tagalog (Filipino) and English are also spoken by Cebuanos as second languages.

Despite being one of the largest ethnic groups, Cebuanos outside their homeland tend to fluently learn the languages native in areas where they settled and assimilated, along with their native language. Hiligaynon is spoken and understood by the Cebuanos living in Negros Occidental and Soccsksargen. They often speak a mixture of Cebuano and Hiligaynon in Sagay and neighboring municipalities of Negros Occidental facing Iloilo and Cebu and municipalities bordering Negros Oriental, Bukidnon and Davao del Sur. Cebuano residents in Zamboanga City and Caraga Region are fluent in Zamboanga Chavacano, Butuanon and Surigaonon respectively, with the two latter are related to Cebuano. They have also varying fluencies in various Lumad languages, the Danao languages, Tausug (linguistically related to Cebuano), Yakan, and Sama, in which these languages are native to the areas where Cebuanos also inhabit, coexist with and even assimilated to the natives, and to the lesser extent, Ilocano (a language originated in Ilocandia), which is also spoken in Soccsksargen and various parts of Bukidnon, Misamis Oriental, Caraga, Zamboanga Sibugay and Davao Region. Cebuanos in Masbate and Eastern Visayas can also speak Masbateño, one of the Bicol languages and Waray.

== See also ==
- Demographics of the Philippines
- Ethnic groups in the Philippines
- Cebu
- Cebuano language
- Rajahnate of Cebu
- Tagalog people
- Kapampangan people
- Ilocano people
- Ivatan people
- Igorot people
- Pangasinan people
- Bicolano people
- Negrito
- Visayan people
  - Aklanon people
  - Boholano people
  - Capiznon people
  - Cuyunon people
  - Eskaya people
  - Hiligaynon people
  - Karay-a people
  - Masbateño people
  - Porohanon people
  - Romblomanon people
  - Suludnon
  - Waray people
- Lumad
- Moro people
