= Lapulapu Memorial Shrine and Museum =

Proposed museum in Lapu-Lapu City, Philippines

General information
- Status: Proposed
- Location: Mactan Shrine, Lapu-Lapu City, Philippines
- Named for: Lapulapu
- Groundbreaking: April 27, 2021
- Estimated completion: 2023

The Lapulapu Memorial Shrine and Museum is a proposed museum and monument to Lapulapu to be built at Mactan Shrine in Lapu-Lapu City, Philippines.

== History ==
As a preparation for the 2021 Quincentennial Commemorations in the Philippines, the Mactan Shrine park in Lapu-Lapu City was renovated. By September 2019, the initial plans for the shrine called for the replacement of the 20 m (66 ft) bronze statue of Lapulapu with a larger monument depicting the Battle of Mactan; the bronze statue is planned to be reinstalled in a courtyard of a museum to be built within the area. At around this time a design competition for the monument which was supposed to be launched the following month was being planned.

By 2020, the government abandoned plans to replace the existing Lapulapu statue. In July 2020, it was announced that the National Quincentennial Committee (NQC) will have three flagship projects for the Quincentennial which includes the construction of the Lapulapu Memorial Shrine and Museum. The NQC launched the national monument design competition in September 2020 with the winning design announced in early 2021.

The groundbreaking ceremony for the Lapulapu Memorial Shrine and Museum was held virtually due to the COVID-19 pandemic. Actual construction is planned for 2022 with the museum projected to open in 2023.

However, the project is not yet complete as of April 2023 due to budget constraints. Lapu-Lapu City mayor Junard Chan asked financial assistance from the National Historical Commission of the Philippines (NHCP), but the agency failed to allocate a budget. Chan approached Department of Tourism Secretary Christina Frasco for a budget to build the museum.

== Architecture and design ==
=== Museum structure ===
The Lapulapu Memorial Shrine and Museum would be built along the shore of Barangay Mactan with the structure extending over water. The structure's roof is made to resemble a sakayan, to signify the Philippines' "common maritime heritage". The left and right portions of the structure would host the museum's galleries and function rooms while the middle portion is an open hallway where the Lapulapu national monument would be placed.

=== National monument ===
Lapulapu National Monument
- Location: Lapulapu Memorial Shrine and Museum
- Designer: Rex Sicat Jr.
- Dedicated to: Lapulapu

The Lapulapu Memorial Shrine and Museum will house the Lapulapu National Monument. The design of the monument will be based on the winning entry of the Lapulapu National Monument Design Competition launched by the NQC in September 2020 entitled The Watch of Mactan. The Watch of Mactan was a design by Tarlac-based architect Rex Sicat Jr. which featured a sculpture of Lapulapu on top of a trapezoidal pedestal acting as a sentry with sculptures of three warriors in a mangatang stance and figures of a mother and child at its base.

The sculpture reportedly will be 9.55 meters (31.3 ft). However, President Rodrigo Duterte made his stance known that Lapulapu's statue should be taller than 30-meter (98 ft) Magellan Monument.
