= 2021 Quincentennial Commemorations in the Philippines =

500th anniversary of Magellan's landing and Lapu-Lapu's victory

- Date: March 16, 2021 – April 27, 2022
- Location: Primarily in the Philippines (some events held outside the country)
- Type: Series of commemorations
- Theme: "Victory and Humanity"
- Organized by: National Quincentennial Committee
- Website: nqc.gov.ph (Archived)

The 2021 Quincentennial Commemorations in the Philippines (2021 QCP) was a series of observances organized to mark the 500th anniversary of various events in the Philippines, notably the introduction of Christianity in the Philippines, the role of the country in the Magellan–Elcano circumnavigation, and the victory of Lapulapu in the Battle of Mactan.

== Background ==
Executive Order No. 103 signed by President Rodrigo Duterte on January 28, 2020

The Philippine national government aims to commemorate the 500th anniversary of the Filipinos' first contact with the Spanish in 1521 from a Filipino-centric point of view in 2021. The National Quincentennial Committee (NQC) was formed for this purpose in May 2018, when President Rodrigo Duterte issued Executive Order (EO) No. 55. President Duterte issued EO 103 on January 28, 2020, formalizing the intent for the commemorations to be "Filipino-centric" and expanded the membership and scope of the NQC.

The 2021 QCP was meant to commemorate three main events. The NQC has also released official names for the quincentennial for the three events.

- 500th anniversary of the introduction of Christianity in the Philippines – Due to the arrival of the Spanish marking the introduction of Christianity in the Philippines, which became the dominant religion in the country.
- 500th anniversary of the Philippine part in the first circumnavigation of the world – Commemorates the stopover of the Magellan–Elcano circumnavigation in the Philippines. The NQC specifically advises against naming the event as the "arrival of Magellan" in the Philippines or the Western characterization of the event as the "discovery" of the Philippines.
- 500th anniversary of the Victory at Mactan – Which commemorates the victory of Lapulapu in the Philippines in the Battle of Mactan. While the NQC recognizes that Lapulapu and his contemporaries were not technically Filipinos, its position is that they are still worthy of recognition since modern-day Filipinos are their descendants. The NQC commemorates their "ideals, their sacrifices, their struggles" and holds them as a sources of inspirations.

The Catholic Bishops' Conference of the Philippines (CBCP) has involvement in events related to the quincentennial related to the Christianity in the Philippines. Bishop Pablo Virgilio David, representing the CBCP, rejects the notion that celebrating the 500th anniversary of the introduction of the Philippines as also celebrating the Spanish colonization of the islands, citing continued prevalence of the religion long after colonization, and asserts that Filipino ancestors were intelligent enough to accept what is good and reject what is evil among the introductions made by the Spanish in the Philippines.

Despite the COVID-19 pandemic, the 2021 QCP was held albeit modified to comply with protocols imposed in response to the health crisis. About 50 projects related to the quincentennial were either canceled or indefinitely postponed.

== Marketing ==
=== Branding ===
The logo for the 2021 QCP was adopted on August 14, 2019. The theme for the event was "Victory and Humanity". A brand manual has been released which tackles branding guidelines for the event which is intended to serve as a reference for participating local government units. In official communications in relation to the event, the NQC refers to Lapulapu as "Lapulapu" without the hyphen, which is the preferred spelling for the native leader by the National Historical Commission of the Philippines. The main basis for the spelling choice was Antonio Pigafetta's chronicle of the Magellan-Elcano circumnavigation which referred to the Mactan leader as "Cilapulapu" where "Ci" is believed to be the local honorific "Si" derived from the Indic honorific "Sri".

=== Music ===
An official soundtrack was released for the event called the Limandaan: The 2021 Quincentennial Commemorations in the Philippines which contains nine Original Pilipino Music (OPM) songs including "Bagani" the main theme song of the occasion. The soundtrack was encouraged to be played in public spaces by the government as part of the observances for the commemorations.

=== Other ===
The Bangko Sentral ng Pilipinas, the Philippines' central bank, released a commemorative ₱5,000 banknote and medal featuring Lapu Lapu.

== Events ==
=== First circumnavigation and Victory at Mactan ===
- December 14, 2019 – Start of the 500-day countdown to the 500th anniversary of the Victory at Mactan.
- January 17, 2021 – Start of the 100-day countdown for the 500th anniversary of the Victory at Mactan.
  - The Philippine flag at the Mactan Shrine was permanently hoisted starting from this date becoming one of the few sites in the country required to do so.
  - Quincentennial logo unveiling at the Rizal Park in Manila.
- March 16, 2021:
  - Commemoration of the arrival of Ferdinand Magellan and the commencement of the quincentennial celebrations in Guiuan, Eastern Samar.
  - The Spanish training ship Juan Sebastián de Elcano visited Guiuan in Eastern Samar, the Suluan and Homonhon islands and Cebu, coinciding with the points visited by the historic Magellan-Elcano expedition in the Philippines, until March 22.

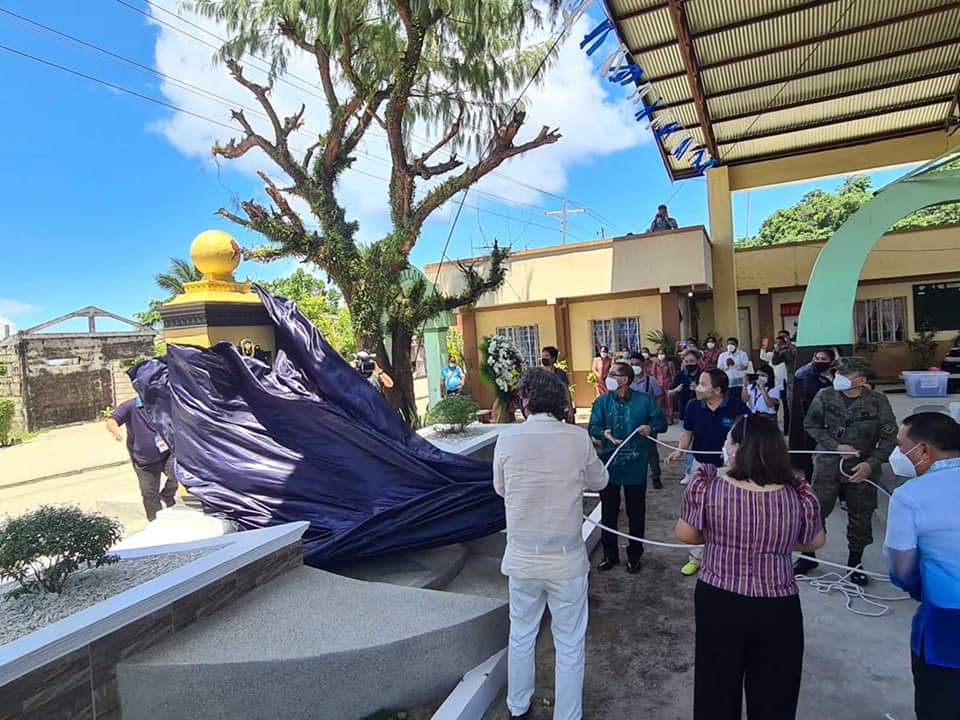
Unveiling of the Quincentennial Marker in Suluan Island.

- March 18 – October 28, 2021: Thirty-four Quincentennial markers were unveiled in different sites in the Philippines.
- April 27, 2021: Commemoration of the Battle of Mactan and the groundbreaking of the Lapulapu Memorial Shrine and Museum.
- April 27, 2022: President Rodrigo Duterte closes the quincentennial celebrations in Mactan.

== Competitions ==
=== Art competition ===
The Quincentennial Art Competition was launched in July 2020. The competition was made open to Philippine-based Filipino citizens of at least 18-years of age. The competition had four categories with separate themes. A grand winner and two winners of minor awards were conferred for each of the four themes.

Themes

- Sovereignty – Commemoration of the Victory of Mactan
- Magnanimity – Depiction of the compassion of Filipino ancestors to members of the Magellan–Elcano expedition
- Unity – Blood compact between the rajah of Mazaua and Ferdinand Magellan
- Legacy – First Baptism, Presentation of the Santo Niño in Cebu.

Grand winners

- Sovereignty – Hindi Pasisiil by Matthius Garcia
- Magnanimity – The Presence of Goodwill by Teodie Boylie Perez
- Unity – Blood Compact: Reimagined by Herbert Pinpiño
- Legacy – Presentation of the Icon by Bernardo A. Maac

=== Monument competition ===
The Lapulapu Monument Design Competition was launched by the NHCP on September 14, 2020, to determine the design of a Lapulapu monument to be erected as the centerpiece of the Lapulapu Memorial Shrine and Museum. The shrine and museum structure itself will be built along the shore of the Mactan Shrine and the monument itself will be distinct from the existing bronze statue of Lapulapu.

The winner of the competition was The Watch of Mactan by Tarlac-based architecture firm Sicat Design Services with Rex B. Sicat Jr. as its principal proponent.

== See also ==
- Philippine Centennial
