= List of Quincentennial historical markers in the Philippines =

Quincentennial historical markers
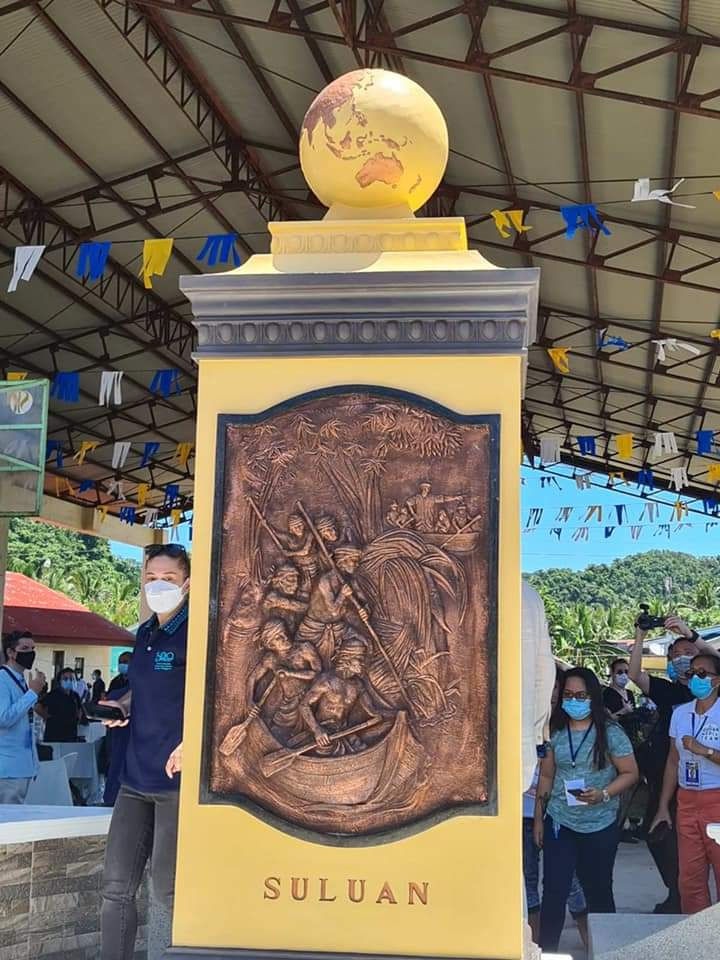
- The Suluan Quincentennial marker
- Location: 34 different sites in the Philippines
- Designer: Relief: Jonas Roces and Francis Apiles (based on sketches by muralist Derrick Macutay)
- Type: Historical markers
- Dedicated date: Magellan-Elcano expedition in the Philippine archipelago

The following is a list of Quincentennial historical markers unveiled by the National Historical Commission and the National Quincentennial Committee as part of the 2021 Quincentennial Commemorations in the Philippines (QCP).

== Background ==
=== Sites ===
Thirty-four historical markers were unveiled in several sites in the Philippines as part of the 2021 Quincentennial Commemorations in the country. The markers were installed on site with the help of the Department of the Interior and Local Government (DILG) and the Armed Forces of the Philippines. Of these markers, ten were installed in Eastern Visayas. The first unveiled was the Suluan marker in the island of the same name in Guiuan, Eastern Samar on March 16, 2021, with the last marker scheduled to be unveiled on October 28, 2021.

=== Design ===
The markers were created through the coordination of the National Historical Commission of the Philippines (NHCP) and the National Quincentennial Committee (NQC), the latter being the main government-run organizing body for the 2021 Quincentennial. The markers collectively depict select events of the Magellan-Elcano voyage in the Philippine archipelago. Each marker consist of a pedestal with a globe motif on top as a finial. The obliquity of the globe element was also certified by the Philippine Space Agency. On one side of the pedestal is the commemoration plaque and on another side is a dust marble relief which has a design dependent on the specific site of the marker. The reliefs are made by sculptors Jonas Roces and Francis Apiles and are based on sketches by muralist Derrick Macutay. The NHCP described the designs as a deviation from typical "orientalist" depictions by foreigners of pre-colonial Filipinos as savages. The markers are an attempt to depict events of the expedition from a Filipino point of view.

The "Samar" marker is unique because aside from the usual pedestal and markers, it also has a Spanish-language marker on a separate pedestal. The marker was a gift from Spain through then-Ambasador Jorge Moragas.

== List ==
Order number	Marker title	Marker location	Date(s) of commemorated event	Date when marker was unveiled	Marker photo
1	Samar	Calicoan Island, Guiuan, Eastern Samar	March 16, 1521	March 18, 2021	
2	Suluan	Suluan, Guiuan, Eastern Samar	March 16, 1521	March 16, 2021	
3	Homonhon	Homonhon Island, Guiuan, Eastern Samar	March 17, 1521	March 17, 2021	
4	Gibusong	Gibusong, Loreto, Dinagat Islands	March 25, 1521	March 25, 2021	
5	Hinunangan	Hinunangan, Southern Leyte	March 25, 1521	March 25, 2021	
6	Limasawa (Mazaua)	Limasawa, Southern Leyte	March 27 – April 4, 1521	March 31, 2021	
7	Leyte	Brgy. Combado, Maasin, Southern Leyte	April 1521	April 4, 2021	
8	Canigao	Canigao Island, Matalom, Leyte	April 1521	April 5, 2021	
9	Baybay	Punta Church, Brgy. Punta, Baybay, Leyte	April 1521	April 5, 2021	
10	Gatighan	Himokilan Island, Hindang, Leyte	April 1521	April 5, 2021	
11	Ponson	Ponson Island, Pilar, Cebu	April 1521	April 6, 2021	
12	Poro	Mactang Beach, Brgy. Esperanza, Poro (Poro Island), Cebu	April 1521	April 6, 2021	
13	Ticobon	San Francisco (Pacijan Island), Cebu	April 1521	April 6, 2021	
14	Cebu	Plaza Sugbo, Brgy. Central, Cebu City	April 7 – May 1, 1521	April 7, 2021	
15	Mactan	Mactan Shrine, Mactan Island, Lapu-Lapu City	April 27, 1521	April 27, 2021	
16	Bohol	Brgy. Punta Cruz, Maribojoc, Bohol	May 2, 1521	June 17, 2021	
17	Panilongon (Negros)	Rizal Boulevard, Dumaguete	May 1521	May 4, 2021	
18	Kipit	Brgy. Kipit, Labason, Zamboanga del Norte	May 1521	May 7, 2021	
19	Cagayan (Mapun)	Isla Keana, Brgy. Iruk-Iruk, Mapun, Tawi-Tawi	No recorded date	September 6, 2021	
20	Palawan	Sitio Marikit, Barangay San Juan, Aborlan, Palawan	No recorded date	September 22, 2021	
21	Tagusao (Dyguazam/Tegozzao)	Sitio Tagusao, Brgy. Barong-Barong, Brooke's Point, Palawan	No recorded date	October 19, 2021	
22	Balabac	Brgy. Poblacion V, Balabac, Palawan	No recorded date	October 11, 2021	
23	Palawan Cape	Buliluyan Elementary School, Brgy. Buliluyan, Bataraza, Palawan	No recorded date	November 9, 2021	
24	Sulu	Jolo, Sulu	October 1521	October 24, 2021	
25	Tagima (Basilan)	Fuego Fuego Beach Front, Barangay Tabiawan, Isabela, Basilan	October 1521	November 11, 2021	
26	Cawit	Cawit Elementary School, Brgy. Cawit, Zamboanga City	October 1521	December 27, 2021	
27	Subanin	Zamboanga City	October 1521	March 21, 2022	
28	Manalipa	Brgy. Manalipa, Zamboanga City	October 1521	March 21, 2022	
29	Katubigan ng Golpo ng Moro	Pagadian City Fish Port, Pagadian City	October 1521	December 22, 2021	
30	Maguindanao	Old Cotabato City Hall Museum, Cotabato City	October 1521	October 19, 2021	
31	Benaian	Brgy. Kamangan, Maasim, Sarangani	October 1521		
32	Batulaki	Brgy. Batulaki, Glan, Sarangani	October 26, 1521	October 26, 2021	
33	Candighar (Balut)	Municipal Compound, Brgy. Mabila, Balut Island, Sarangani, Davao Occidental	October 27, 1521	October 27, 2021	
34	Sarangani	Sitio Upper Pali, Brgy. Camalig, Sarangani Island, Sarangani, Davao Occidental	October 28, 1521	October 28, 2021	

== See also ==
- Historical markers of the Philippines
