= Lapulapu =

Datu of Mactan (fl. 1521)

- Imaginary posthumous portrait of Lapulapu in his elder years, by Carlo Caacbay for the National Historical Commission of the Philippines, 2019

Datu of Mactan (one of two)

Lapulapu (fl. 1521), also spelled Lapu-Lapu, and whose name was first recorded as Çilapulapu, was a Datu of Mactan, an island now part of the Philippines.

Lapulapu is known for the 1521 Battle of Mactan, where he and his forces defeated Spanish expeditionary troops led by Portuguese explorer Ferdinand Magellan, who was killed in the battle. Magellan's death ended his voyage of circumnavigation and delayed Spanish expansion into the archipelago until the expedition of Miguel López de Legazpi in 1565.

Lapulapu is widely commemorated in Philippine historiography and popular tradition as a symbol of resistance to Spanish colonization. Monuments to Lapulapu have been erected throughout the Philippines in his honor. The Philippine National Police (PNP) and the Bureau of Fire Protection (BFP) use his image as part of their official seals.

Besides being a rival of another datu of Mactan named Zula (it being unclear if they were equal co-rulers or not) and also of Rajah Humabon of neighboring Cebu, very little is reliably known about his life. The only existing primary source mentioning him by name is the account of Antonio Pigafetta, and according to historian Resil B. Mojares, no European who left a primary record of Magellan's voyage "actually saw him, knew what he looked like, heard him speak (his recorded words of defiance and pride are all indirect), or mentioned that he was present in the battle of Mactan that made him famous."

== Battle of Mactan ==
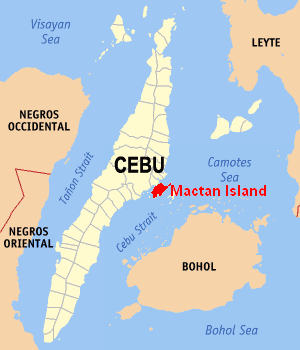
Location of Mactan in Cebu

Lapulapu was one of the two chiefs of Mactan before the Spanish arrived in the archipelago, the other being Zula. When Portuguese explorer Ferdinand Magellan arrived in the Philippines in the service of Spain, Zula was one of those who gave tribute to the Spanish king while Lapulapu refused. In the midnight of April 27, 1521, Magellan led a force of around 60 Spaniards and 20 to 30 war boats (karakoa) of Humabon's warriors from Cebu. They arrived in Mactan three hours before dawn. However, because of the presence of rock outcroppings and coral reefs, Magellan's ships could not land on the shores of Mactan. Their ships were forced to anchor "two crossbow flights" away from the beach. According to Antonio Pigafetta, they faced around 1,500 warriors of Lapulapu armed with large cutlass iron swords called "Kampilan (Scimitar)" and large shields, (Note: Including what Pigafetta described as a "large cutlass", traditionally illustrated as the two-handed kampilan. This may possibly have been another sword type because Pigafetta further says it resembled "a scimitar, only being larger", and the kampilan is straight while the scimitar is curved.) bows, and "bamboo" spears. (Note: Bangkaw, a light spear weapon that can be thrown. It is actually made of fire-hardened rattan, which superficially resembles bamboo, and is usually tipped with metal heads.)

Magellan repeated his offer not to attack them if Lapulapu swore fealty to Rajah Humabon, obeyed the Spanish king, and paid tribute, which Lapulapu again rejected. At the taunting request of Lapulapu, the battle did not begin until morning. Magellan, perhaps hoping to impress Humabon's warriors with the superiority of European armor and weapons, told Humabon's warriors to remain in their ships. Magellan and 49 of the heavily armored Spaniards (armed with lances, swords, crossbows, and muskets) waded ashore to meet Lapulapu's forces. They set fire to a few houses on the shore in an attempt to scare them. Instead, Lapulapu's warriors became infuriated and charged. Two Spaniards were killed immediately in the fighting, and Magellan was wounded in the leg with a poisoned arrow. He ordered a retreat, which most of his men followed except for a few who remained to protect him. Magellan was recognized as the captain by the natives, and became the focus of the attack. Outnumbered and encumbered by their armor, Magellan's forces were quickly overwhelmed and killed along with Magellan. Some remaining survivors escaped to their waiting ships.

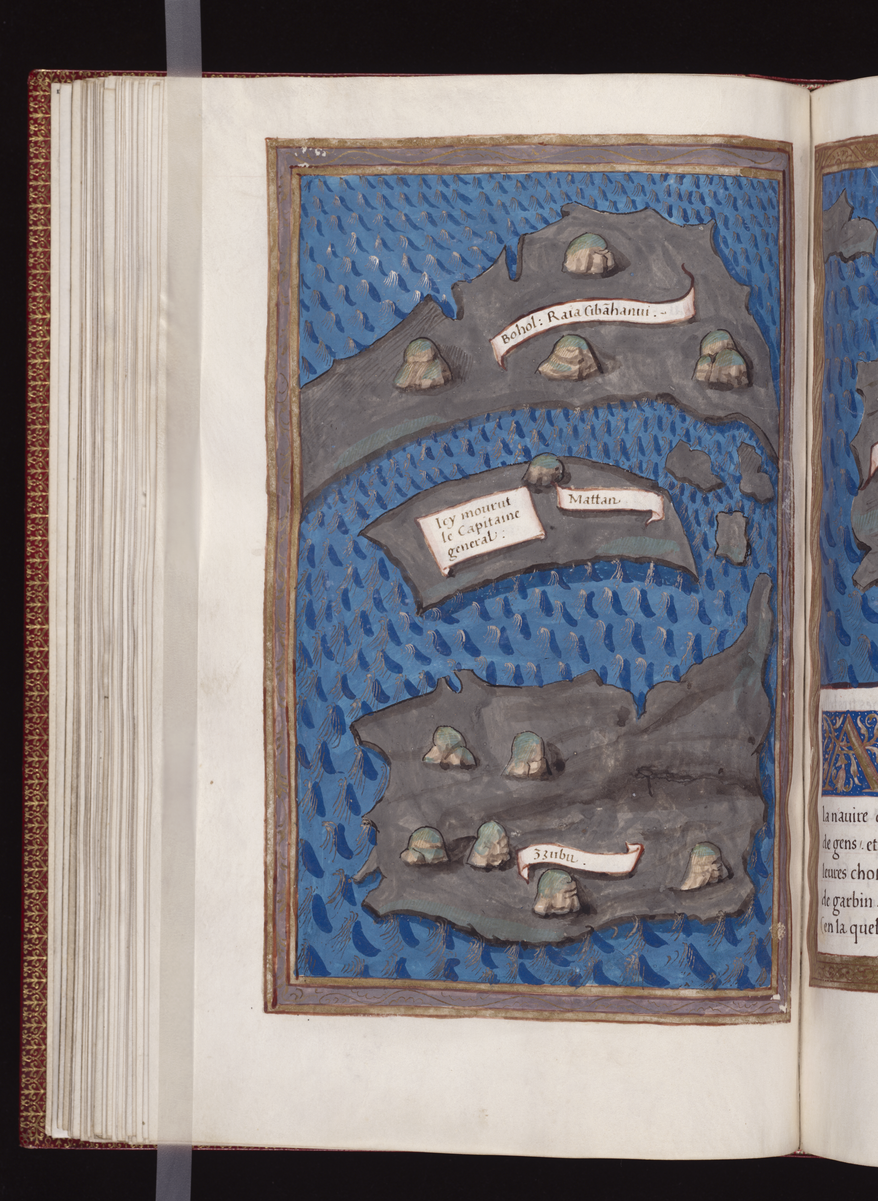
Illustration from Antonio Pigafetta's journal showing Cebu, Mactan, and Bohol; with a label indicating that the "Capitaine general" died on Mactan (c. 1525)

The historian William Henry Scott believes that Lapulapu's hostility may have been the result of a mistaken assumption by Magellan. Magellan assumed that ancient Filipino society was structured in the same way as European society (i.e. with royalty ruling over a region). While this may have been true in the Islamic sultanates in Mindanao, the Visayan societies were structured along a loose federation of city-states (more accurately, a chiefdom). The most powerful datu in such a federation has limited power over another member datu, but no direct control over the subjects or lands of the other datu.

Thus Magellan believed that since Rajah Humabon was the king of Cebu, he was the king of Mactan as well. But the island of Mactan, the dominion of Lapulapu and Zula, was in a location that enabled them to intercept trade ships entering the harbor of Cebu, Humabon's domain. Thus, it was more likely that Lapulapu was actually more powerful than Humabon, or at least was the undisputed ruler of Mactan. Humabon was married to Lapulapu's niece. When Magellan demanded that Lapulapu submit as his King Humabon had done, Lapulapu purportedly replied that: "he was unwilling to come and do reverence to one whom he had been commanding for so long a time".

The battle left the expedition with too few men to crew three ships, so they abandoned the Concepción. The remaining ships – the Trinidad and the Victoria – sailed to the Spice Islands in present-day Indonesia. From there, the expedition split into two groups. The Trinidad, commanded by Gonzalo Gómez de Espinosa tried to sail eastward across the Pacific Ocean to the Isthmus of Panama. Disease and shipwreck disrupted Espinoza's voyage and most of the crew died. Survivors of the Trinidad returned to the Spice Islands, where the Portuguese imprisoned them. The Victoria continued sailing westward, commanded by Juan Sebastián Elcano, and managed to return to Sanlúcar de Barrameda, Spain in 1522. In 1529, King Charles I of Spain relinquished all claim over the Spice Islands to Portugal in the treaty of Zaragoza. However, the treaty did not stop the colonization of the Philippine archipelago from New Spain.

After Magellan's voyage, subsequent expeditions were dispatched to the islands. Five expeditions were sent: Loaisa (1525), Cabot (1526), Saavedra (1527), Villalobos (1542), and Legazpi (1564). The Legazpi expedition was the most successful, resulting in the colonization of the islands.

== Name ==
The earliest record of Lapulapu's name comes from Venetian diarist Antonio Pigafetta who accompanied Magellan's expedition. Pigafetta noted the names of two Datus of the island of Matan (Mactan), the chiefs Zula and Çilapulapu. Pigafetta's account of Magellan's voyage, which contains the only mention of Lapulapu by name in an undisputed primary source, exists in several variant manuscripts and print editions, the earliest dating to around 1524.

In an annotation for his 1890 edition of Antonio de Morga's 1609 Sucesos de las islas Filipinas, José Rizal spells the name as Si Lapulapu. This supplements a passage where Morga mentions Magellan's death in Mactan, but does not mention the Mactan leader by name. In Philippine languages, si (plural siná) is an article used to indicate personal names. Thus Si Lapulapu, as rendered by Rizal, was subsequently interpreted by others to mean this way (though Rizal never explicitly asserts this himself) and the Si was dropped, eventually cementing the Mactan leader's name in Filipino culture as Lapulapu, Lapu-lapu, or Lapu-Lapu (e.g. Siya si Lapulapu "He is Lapulapu" vs. Siya si Si Lapulapu "He is Si Lapulapu"). However, this meaning for Si or Çi in Lapulapu's recorded name is doubtful because not all names recorded by Pigafetta contain it, as would be the case if it were. In an annotation of his 1800 edition of Pigafetta's account, Carlo Amoretti surmised that the Si or Çi found in several native names recorded by Pigafetta was an honorific title. E. P. Patanñe (1999) thus proposes that this usage of Si was derived from a corruption of the Sanskrit title Sri.

In 1604, Fr. Prudencio de Sandoval in his Historia de la Vida y Hechos del Emperador Carlos V spelled the name as Calipulapo, perhaps through transposing the first A and I and misreading the Ç. This further became Cali Pulaco in the 1614 poem Que Dios le perdone (May God Forgive Him) by mestizo de sangley poet Carlos Calao. This rendition, spelled as Kalipulako, was later adopted as one of the pseudonyms of the Philippine hero Mariano Ponce during the Propaganda Movement. The 1898 Philippine Declaration of Independence of Cavite II el Viejo, also mentions Lapulapu under the name Rey Kalipulako de Manktan [sic] (King Kalipulako of Mactan). This name variation has further led to claims that Lapulapu was a Caliph and thus Muslim, whereas Pigafetta notes that the region was not Islamized.

In 2019, the National Historical Commission of the Philippines' National Quincentennial Committee, tasked with handling preparations for the 500th anniversary commemoration of Magellan's arrival, stated that Lapulapu without the hyphen is the correct spelling of the Mactan ruler's name, being based on Pigafetta's original spelling, which they took to be Çilapulapu (approximately rendered as "Silapulapu", not "Kilapulapu", in equivalent Philippine orthography). The committee agreed with previous scholarship that the Si in his name reported by Pigafetta probably was an indigenous form of the Hindu honorific Sri, so Lapulapu would probably have been called Si Lapulapu.

In 2021, President Rodrigo Duterte signed Executive Order No. 152, officially calling to change the rendering of the Filipino hero's name from "Lapu-Lapu" to "Lapulapu", to conform with earlier references. This executive order now requires government and non-government entities to adopt the name "Lapulapu" in all references pertaining to him.

== Origins ==
There is no reliable written record of Lapulapu's origins, but the Cebuano oral tradition holds that the Sugbuanons of Opong was once ruled by a Datu named Mangal and later succeeded by his son named Lapulapu.

== Religion ==
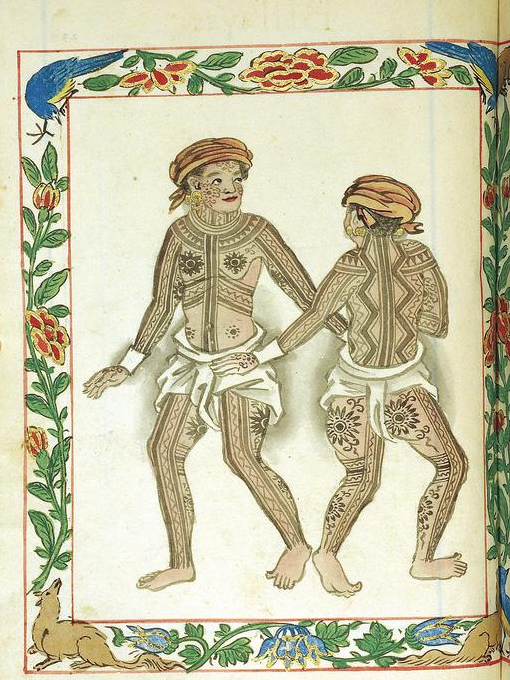
Depiction of the Visayan Pintados in the Boxer Codex (c. 1595)

The historical record strongly suggests that Lapulapu was an adherent of Visayan indigenous animistic anito beliefs. The inhabitants of the Sulu Archipelago believe that Lapulapu was a Muslim belonging to the Tausūg or the Sama-Bajau people of Mindanao, a claim made by the now dissolved Sultanate of Sulu that many historians negate. Moreover, prominent Cebuano anthropologist José Eleazar Bersales says that Cebu was never islamized, referenced from an excavation in Boljoon in southern Cebu. Direct evidences such as accounts of Pigafetta and the native oral tradition did not indicate Lapulapu as a Muslim but a Visayan animist and a Sugbuanon native.

Cebuanos were predominantly animist at the time of the arrival of the Spanish. Visayans were noted for their widespread practice of tattooing; hence, Spaniards referred to them as the Pintados. Pigafetta, who recorded Magellan's encounter with the Cebuanos, explicitly described Rajah Humabon as tattooed. He also records the consumption of pork, dog meat, and palm wine (arak) by the Cebuanos, as well as the common custom of penile piercings (tugbuk or sakra). Tattooing, body modification, pork, dog meat, and alcohol are all ḥarām (forbidden) in Islam.

The supreme deity of the Visayans, as explicitly recorded by contemporary historians, was identified as Abba by Pigafetta and Kan-Laon (also spelled Laon) by the Jesuit historian Pedro Chirino in 1604, comparable to the Tagalog "Bathala". There is no mention of Islam. This is in contrast to the other locations visited by the Magellan expedition where Pigafetta readily identifies the Muslims whom they encountered; he would call them Moros after the Muslim Moors of medieval Spain and northern Africa, to distinguish them from the polytheistic "heathens". In fact, during the mass baptism of the Cebuanos to Christianity, he clearly identifies them as "heathens," not Moros:

We set up the cross there for those people were heathen. Had they been Moros, we would have erected a column there as a token of greater hardness, for the Moros are much harder to convert than the heathen.

— Antonio Pigafetta, Primo viaggio intorno al mondo (c. 1525)

== Aginid ==
The book Aginid, Bayok sa Atong Tawarik ("Glide on, Odes to Our History") published in 1952 by Jovito Abellana supposedly records the oral chronicles from the reign of the last king of Cebu, Rajah Tupas (d. 1565). However, its historicity is disputed as its provenance cannot be traced to earlier than Abellana. Most Filipino historians thus regard it as a hoax akin to the Maragtas and the Code of Kalantiaw, other disputed pre-Hispanic Philippine writings, or more generously, a work of imaginative historical fiction that takes major liberties and should not be treated as authoritative.

The supposed Aginid chronicle gives Lapulapu the full name Lapulapu Dimantag, for di-mataga ("cannot be hacked"), which is also the surname of a prominent family in Mactan. The Aginid also calls him an orang laut ("man of the sea") and an outsider who settled in Cebu from Borneo. The Oponganon-Cebuano oral tradition effectively disputes this claim, saying his father was Datu Mangal of Mactan, indicating that Lapulapu a native of Opong.

The supposed Aginid chronicle records the founding of the kingdom of Cebu by Sri Lumay (also known as Rajamuda Lumaya), who was a half-Tamil and half-Malay from Sumatra. His sons, Sri Alho and Sri Ukob, ruled the neighboring communities of Sialo and Nahalin, respectively. The islands they were in were collectively known as Pulua Kang Dayang or Kangdaya (literally "[the islands] of the lady"). Sri Lumay was known for his strict policies in defending against Moro raiders and slavers from Mindanao. His use of scorched earth tactics to repel invaders gave rise to the name Kang Sri Lumayng Sugbo (literally "that of Sri Lumay's great fire") to the town, which was later shortened to Sugbo ("conflagration"). Upon his death in a battle against the raiders, Sri Lumay was succeeded by his youngest son, Sri Bantug, who ruled from the region of Singhapala (literally "lion city"), now Mabolo in modern Cebu City. Sri Bantug died of a disease during an epidemic and was succeeded by his son Rajah Humabon (also known as Sri Humabon or Rajah Humabara). During Humabon's reign, the region had become an important trading center. The harbors of Sugbo became known colloquially as sinibuayng hingpit ("the place for trading"), shortened to sibu or sibo ("to trade"), from which the modern name "Cebu" originates. (In reality, the name Cebu comes from sugbó or sugbú, meaning "to wade or dive into water".)

According to the Aginid, this was the period in which Lapulapu (as Lapulapu Dimantag) was first recorded as arriving from "Borneo" (Sabah). He asked Humabon for a place to settle, and the king offered him the region of Mandawili (now Mandaue), including the island known as Opong (or Opon), hoping that Lapulapu's people would cultivate the land. They were successful in this, and the influx of farm produce from Mandawili enriched the trade port of Sugbo further. The relationship between Lapulapu and Humabon later deteriorated when Lapulapu turned to piracy. He began raiding merchant ships passing the island of Opong, affecting trade in Sugbo. The island thus earned the name Mangatang ("those who lie in wait"), later evolving to "Mactan".

The Aginid chronicle also records that Humabon had actually purposefully goaded the Spaniards into fighting Lapulapu, who was his enemy at that time. However, the men of Humabon who accompanied Magellan did not engage in battle with Lapulapu, though they helped with recovering the wounded Spaniards. Humabon later poisoned and killed 27 Spanish sailors during a feast. According to the Aginid, this was because they had started raping the local women. It was also possibly to aid Magellan's Malay slave interpreter, Enrique of Malacca, in gaining his freedom. The Spanish were refusing to release him, even though Magellan explicitly willed that he be set free upon his death. A discourse by Giovanni Battista Ramusio also claims that Enrique warned the Chief of "Subuth" that the Spaniards were plotting to capture the king and that this led to the murder of the Spaniards at the banquet. Enrique stayed in Cebu with Humabon while the Spanish escaped to Bohol.

According to the Aginid, Lapulapu and Humabon restored friendly relations after the Battle of Mactan. Lapulapu later decided to return to Borneo with his family and 17 of his men. Nothing more is known of him after this.

== Legacy ==
=== Recognition as a Filipino hero ===
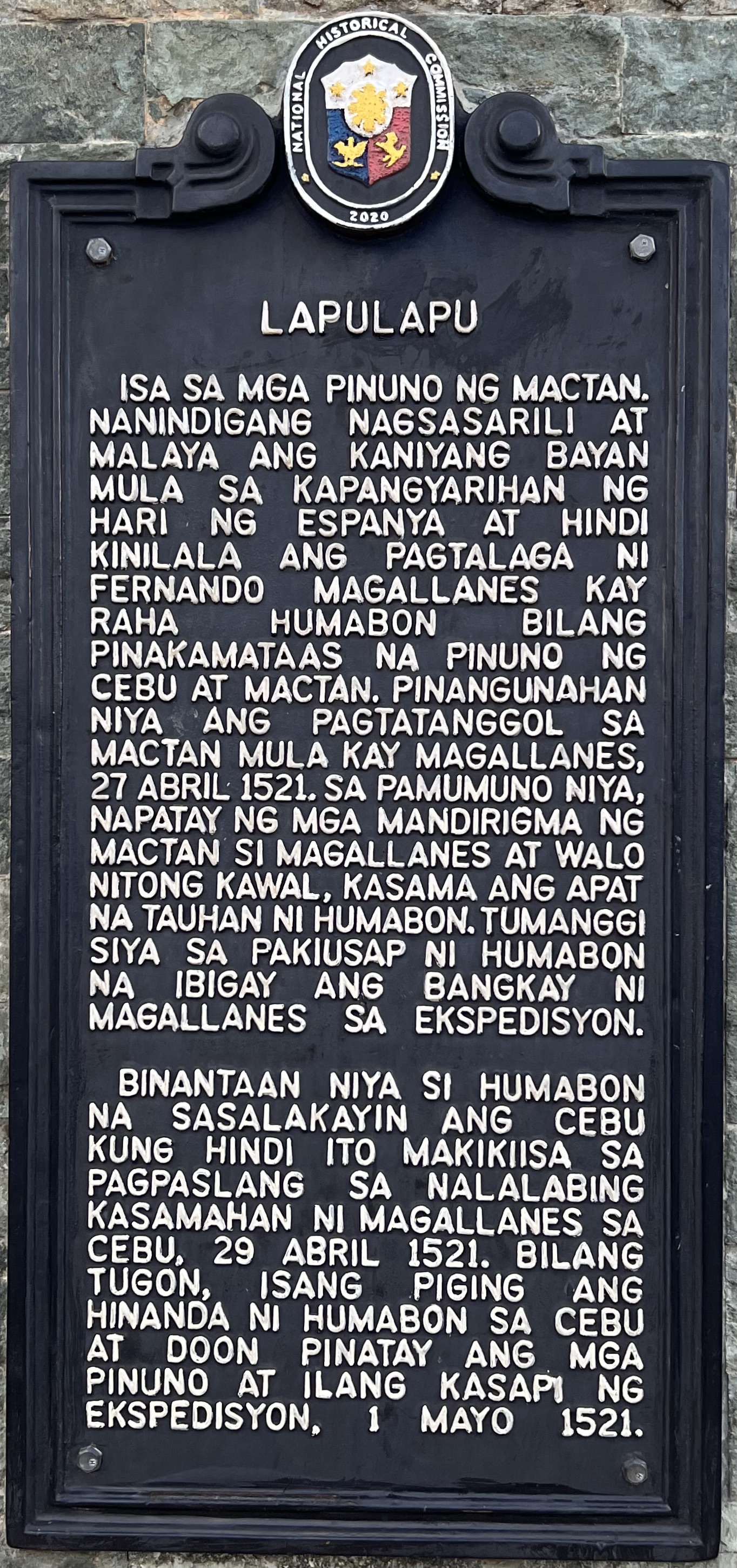
Left: Lapu-Lapu NHC marker at the Mactan Shrine, Lapu-Lapu City, Cebu

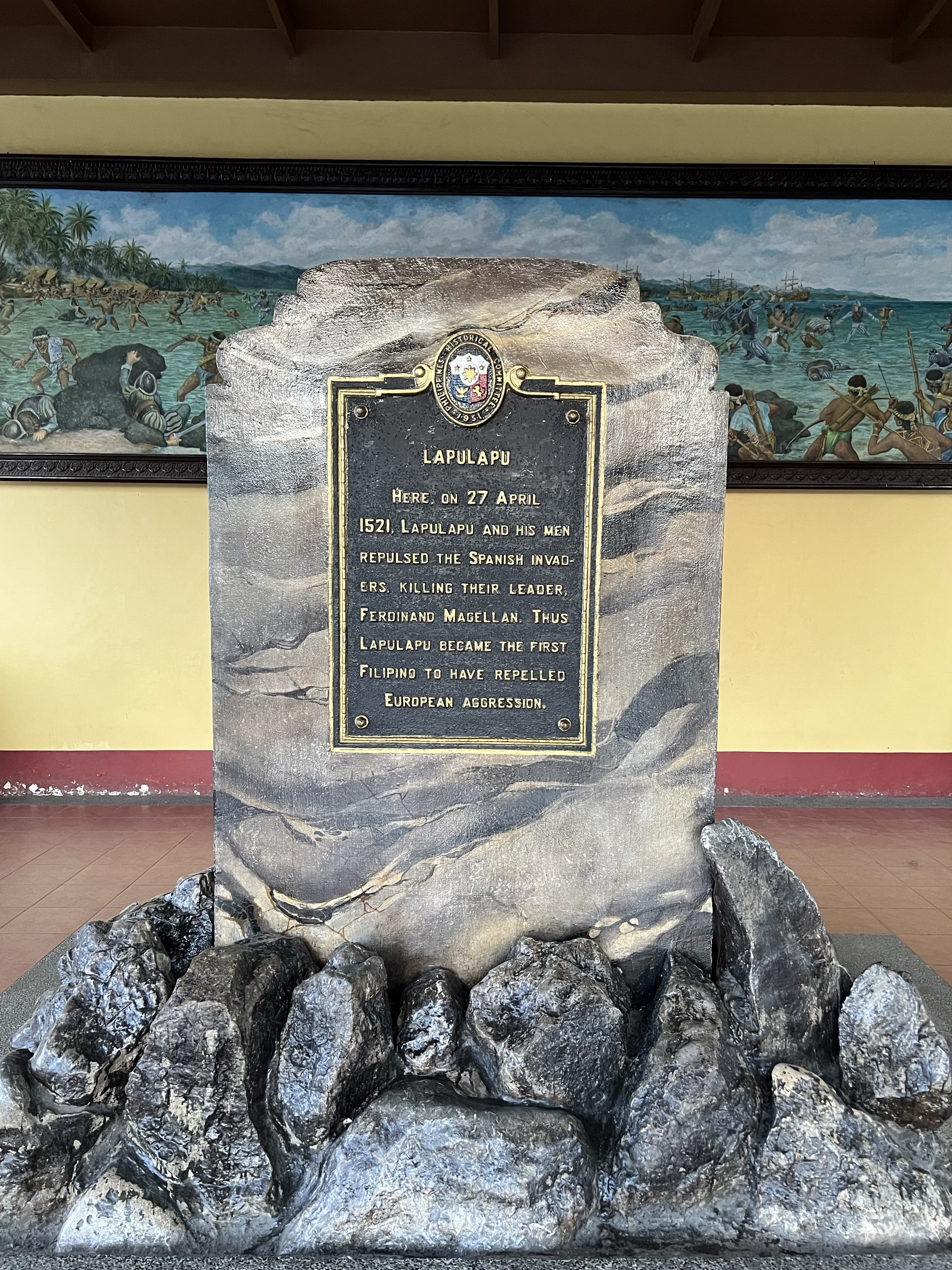
Right: NHC marker commemorating the spot where Lapu-Lapu and his men repulsed the Spanish invaders

Lapulapu is regarded, retroactively, as the first Filipino hero.

On April 27, 2017, President Rodrigo Duterte declared April 27 (the date when the Battle of Mactan happened) as Lapu-Lapu Day for honoring as the first hero in the country who defeated foreign rule. Duterte also signed Executive Order No. 17 creating the Order of Lapu-Lapu which recognizes the services of government workers and private citizens in relation to the campaigns and advocacies of the President. During the First Regular Season of the 14th Congress of the Philippines, Senator Richard Gordon introduced a bill proposing to declare April 27 as an official Philippine national holiday to be known as Adlaw ni Lapu-Lapu, (Cebuano, "Day of Lapu-Lapu").

The government of British Columbia, Canada, officially recognised April 27 as Lapu-Lapu Day in 2023, acknowledging the cultural contributions of the Filipino Canadians, one of the largest immigrant groups in the province. Each year, Lapu-Lapu Day is celebrated by Filipino Canadians in Vancouver.

On April 27, 2024, Lapu-Lapu Day, 300 practitioners of the Philippine martial art arnis performed a historical reenactment of the Battle of Mactan at Mactan Shrine, witnessed by Mayor Junard Chan.

=== Commemorations ===
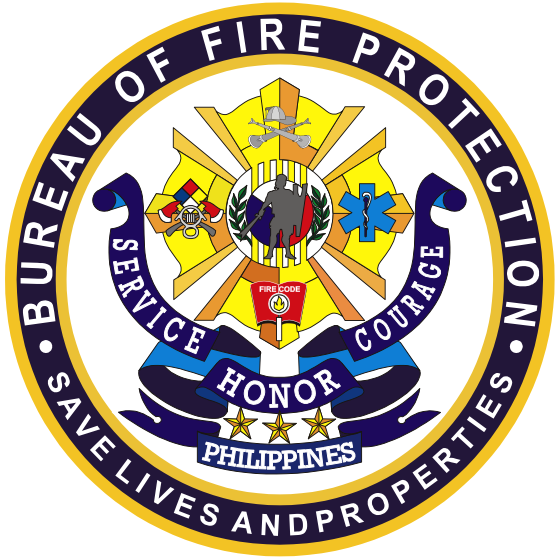
Left: Lapulapu's profile on the obverse of a Philippine 1-centavo coin from the Pilipino Series. Middle and Right: Lapulapu is a central figure in the seal of the Philippine National Police and the Bureau of Fire Protection.

In 1969, the government erected Mactan Shrine in his honor on Mactan Island. The town of Opon in Cebu was renamed to Lapu-Lapu City. A large statue of him, donated by South Korea, stands in the middle of Agrifina Circle in Rizal Park in Manila, replacing a fountain and rollerskating rink. Lapulapu appears on the official seal of the Philippine National Police. His face was used as the main design on the 1-centavo coin that was circulated in the Philippines from 1967 to 1994.

In the United States, a street in South of Market, San Francisco is named after Lapulapu. That street and others in the immediate neighborhood were renamed by the San Francisco Board of Supervisors with names derived from historical Filipino heroes on August 31, 1979.

On January 18, 2021, the Bangko Sentral ng Pilipinas, in cooperation with the Quincentennial Commemorations in the Philippines, launches the 5,000-Piso commemorative non-circulating banknote, in honor of his heroism.

=== In urban legend and folklore ===
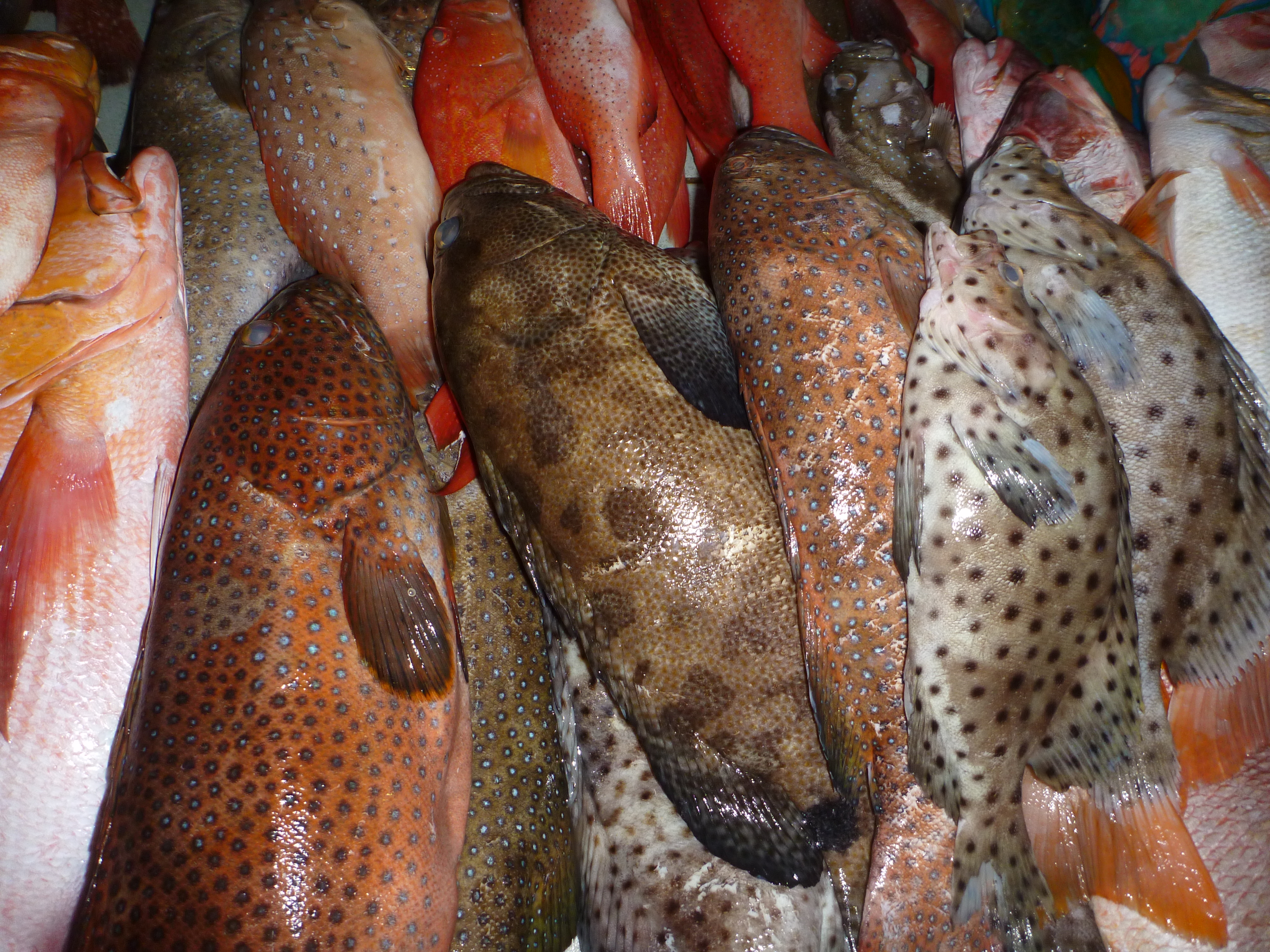
Lapulapu fish, which is a namesake of the Mactan chief

According to local legend, Lapulapu never died but was turned into stone, and has since then been guarding the seas of Mactan. Fisherfolk in Mactan would throw coins at a stone shaped like a man as a means to "ask permission" from Lapulapu to fish "in his territory". Thus, the grouper fish was named after Lapulapu. Another urban legend concerns the statue of Lapulapu erected in 1933 at the center of the town plaza of Lapu-Lapu when the city was still a municipality with the name Opon. The statue faced the old town hall, where mayors used to hold office; Lapulapu was shown with a crossbow in the stance of shooting an enemy. Superstitious citizens proposed to replace this crossbow with a sword, after three consecutive mayors of Opon (Rito dela Serna, Gregorio dela Serna and Simeon Amodia) each died of heart attack. The statue was modified during the administration of Mayor Mariano Dimataga who took office in 1938.
