= Mactan Shrine =

Public park and memorial in the Philippines

- Liberty Shrine; Lapulapu Monument
- The Lapu-Lapu monument at Mactan Shrine

- Location within Metro Cebu
- Type: Memorial park
- Location: Lapu-Lapu City, Philippines
- Coordinates: 10°18′40″N 124°0′55″E
- Established: 1969 (as a national shrine)
- Public transit: 23 MI-01A Punta Engaño

Mactan Shrine, also known as Liberty Shrine or Lapulapu Monument, is a memorial park on the island of Mactan in Lapu-Lapu City, Philippines. It hosts two monuments—the Magellan Monument, which is dedicated to Portuguese born explorer Ferdinand Magellan, and the Lapu Lapu Monument, a bronze statue which commemorates Lapu Lapu, a native leader who defeated Spanish soldiers led by Magellan in the 1521 Battle of Mactan.

== History ==
The Mactan Shrine in Lapu-Lapu City was established in 1969 as national shrine through Republic Act No. 5695 during the administration of President Ferdinand Marcos. The site is believed to be the approximate location of the historic Battle of Mactan, which saw the defeat of the Spaniards led by explorer Ferdinand Magellan against Lapu-Lapu, the datu of Mactan and his forces. The legislation included the Magellan Monument, a structure which was erected back in the Spanish colonial era in 1866. Republic Act No. 5695 also mandated for a monument for Lapu Lapu, who is regarded as hero for his role in the historic battle in 1521 as well as the erection of a Liberty House, a facility which would exhibit memorabilia showcasing the Philippines' history prior to the arrival of the Spanish. In 1981, a bronze statue depicting Lapu-Lapu was erected within the shrine.

In National Historical Commission of the Philippines (NHCP) announced that it would improve the Mactan Shrine in 2019. Reports of plans for the Lapu-Lapu statue received negative reception but the NHCP gave an assurance that the statue won't be relocated. The following year, the National Historical Commission of the Philippines (NHCP) as part of the National Quincentennial Committee which was formed to commemorate the 500th anniversary of the Battle of Mactan unveiled a design for a new Lapu-Lapu Shrine which and launched a design competition for a new Lapu-Lapu monument which will serve as a centerpiece of the structure. The NHCP also launched a bidding in relation to the restoration of the Magellan Shrine.

In preparation for the 2021 Quincentennial Commemorations in the Philippines, the conservation work was done on the Magellan Monument and the Lapulapu sculpture was repainted. Starting January 17, 2021, the mast at the shrine will permanently hoist the Philippine flag.

=== Kadaugan sa Mactan ===
On April 27, 2024, "Lapulapu Day", 300 “eskrimadores,” with "Lapu-Lapu Arnis de Abanico" performed a historical reenactment of “Kadaugan sa Mactan” at Mactan Shrine as witnessed by Mayor Junard Chan.

== Monuments ==
- Lapulapu Monument – A 6 m (20 ft) bronze statue depicting noted native leader, Lapu-Lapu
- Magellan Monument – A stone obelisk built in 1866 dedicated to explorer Ferdinand Magellan who is noted for leading the majority of the first circumnavigation of the Earth.
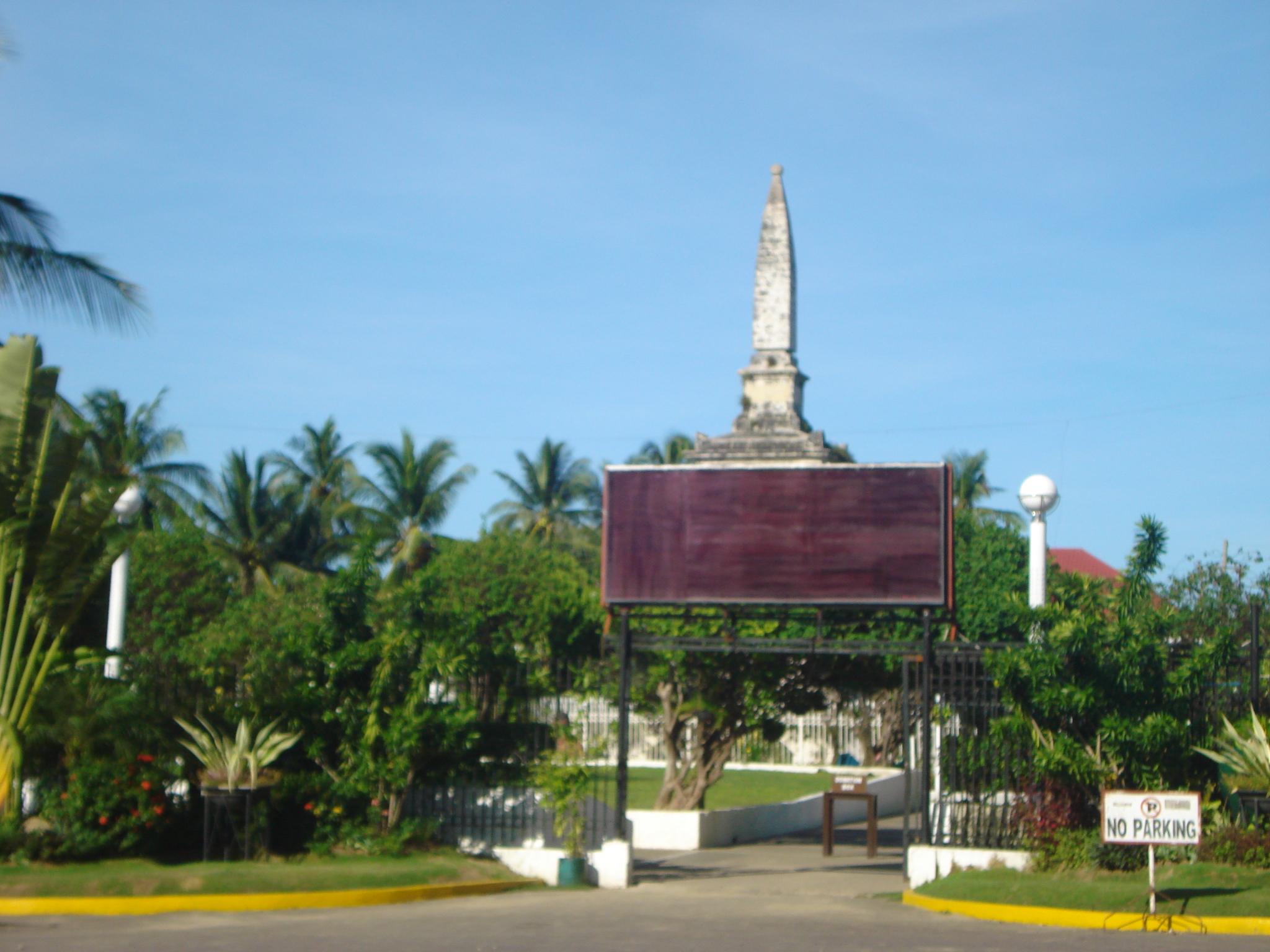
Mactan Shrine entrance

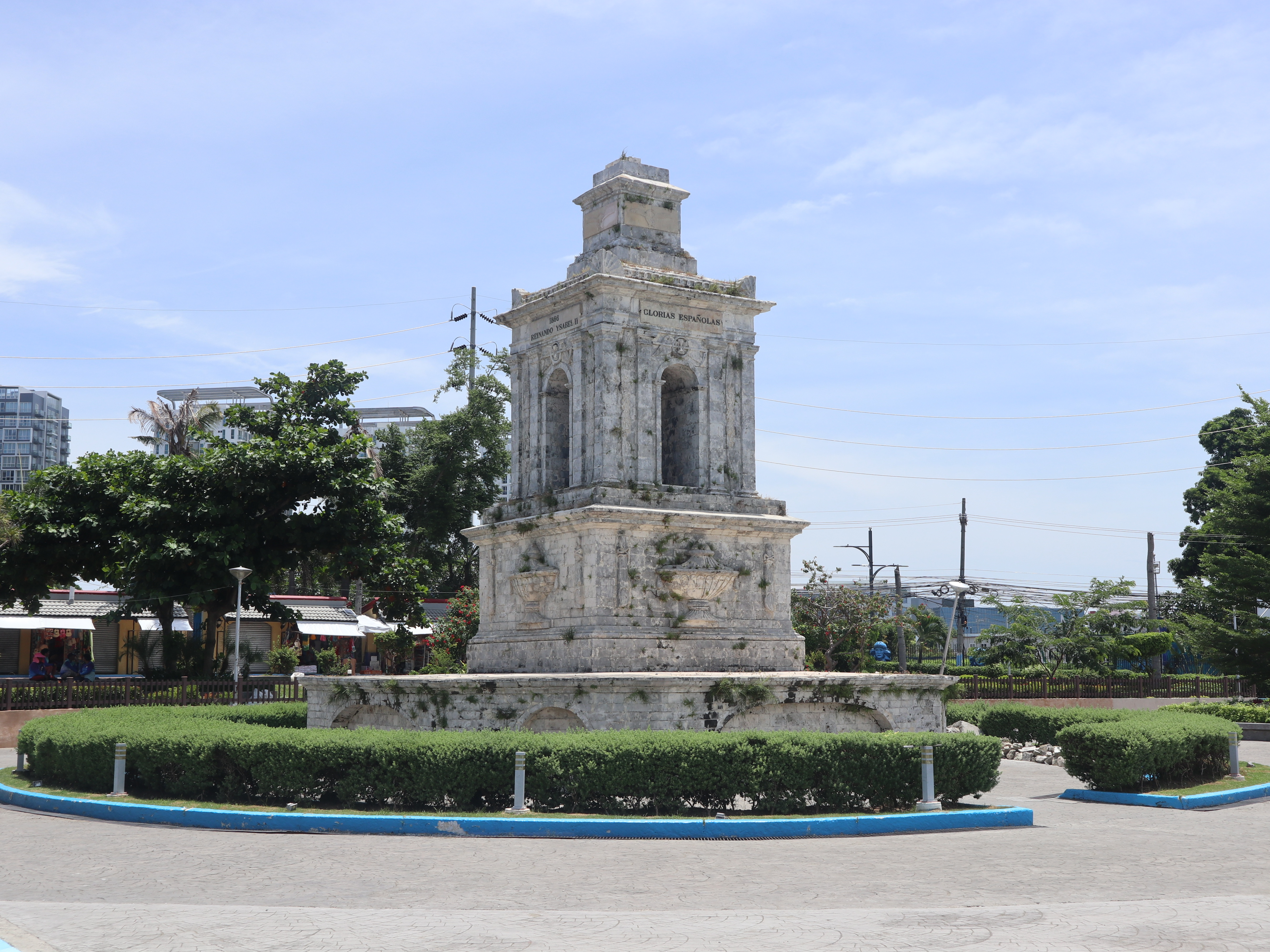
Magellan Monument in 2022, after it was partially damaged by Typhoon Odette

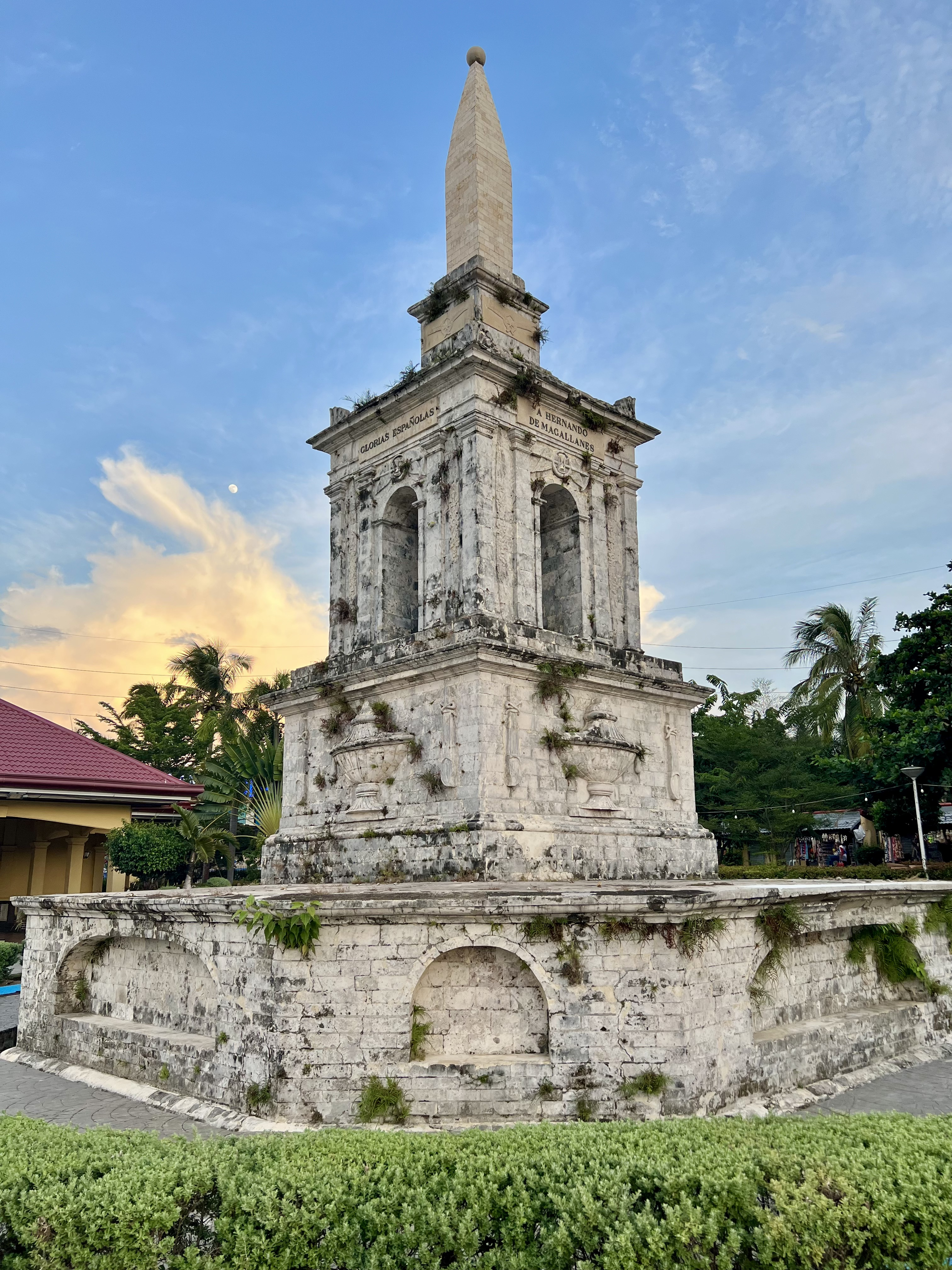
Magellan Monument in 2026

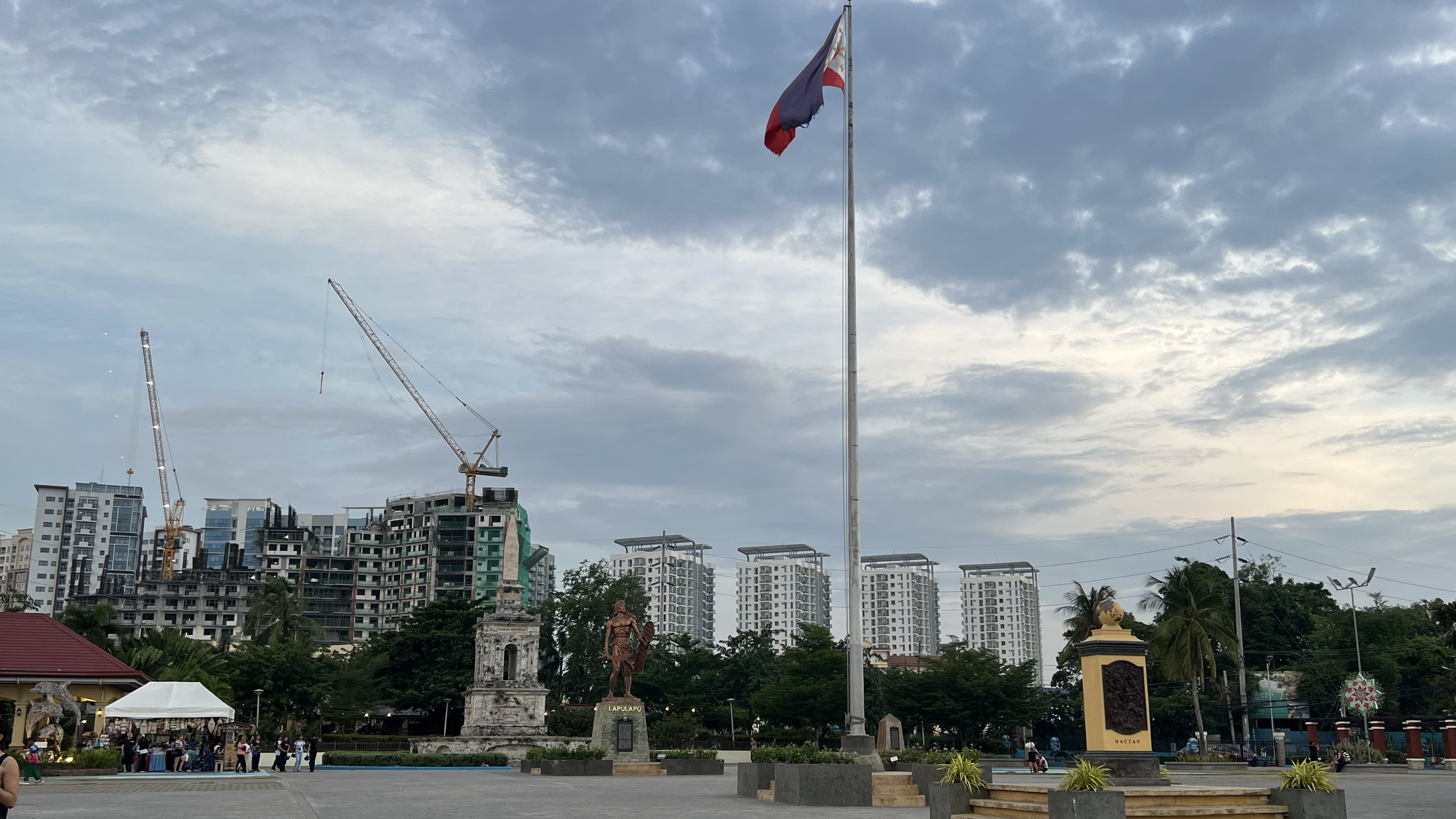
The shrine in 2026, with the Magellan Monument (left), Lapu-Lapu monument (center), and Philippine Quincentennial Marker (right)

== National Historical Commission (NHC) Markers ==
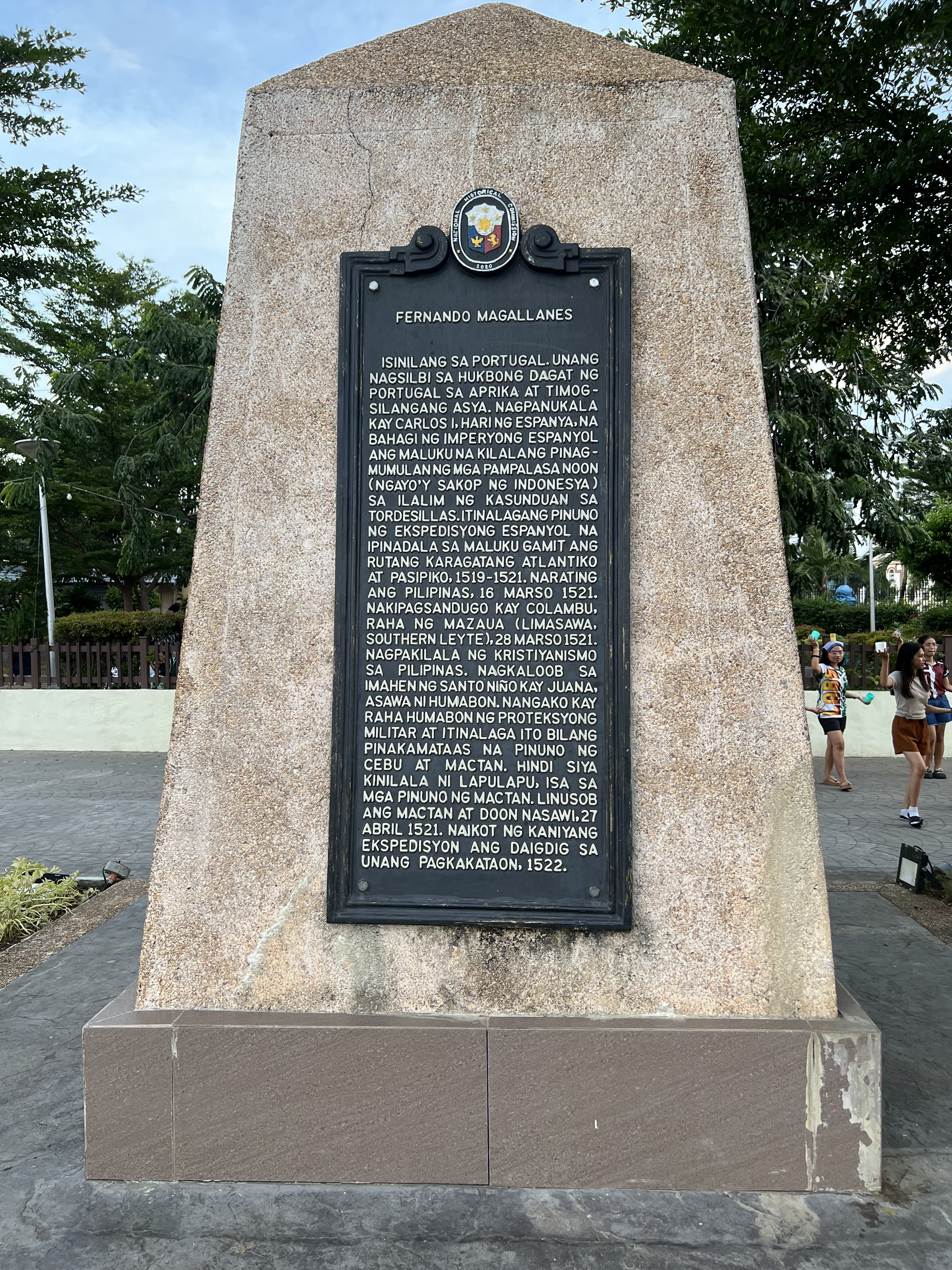
NHC plaque commemorating Ferdinand Magellan

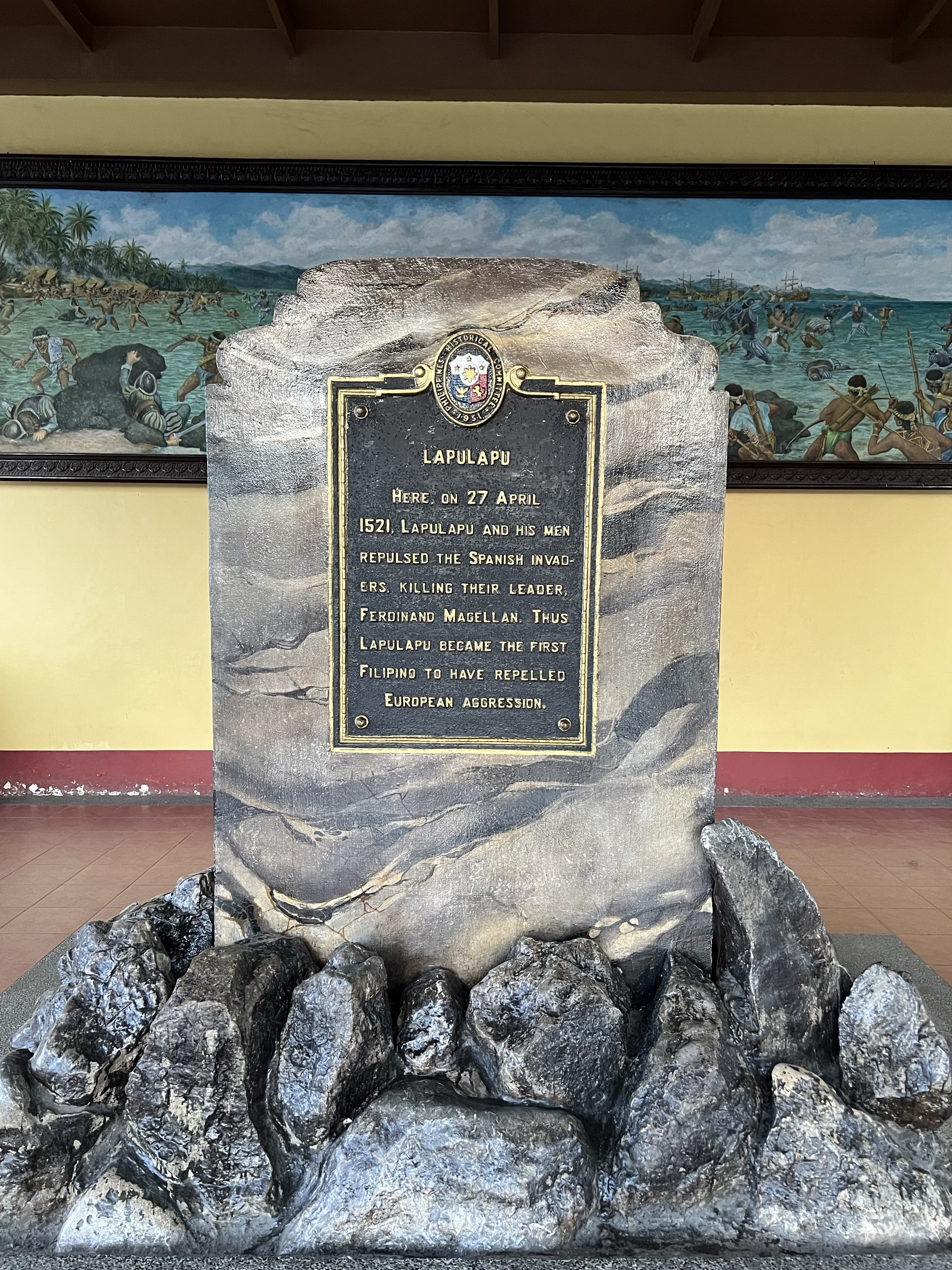
Plaque commemorating the site where Lapulapu and his men repulsed the Spanish invaders

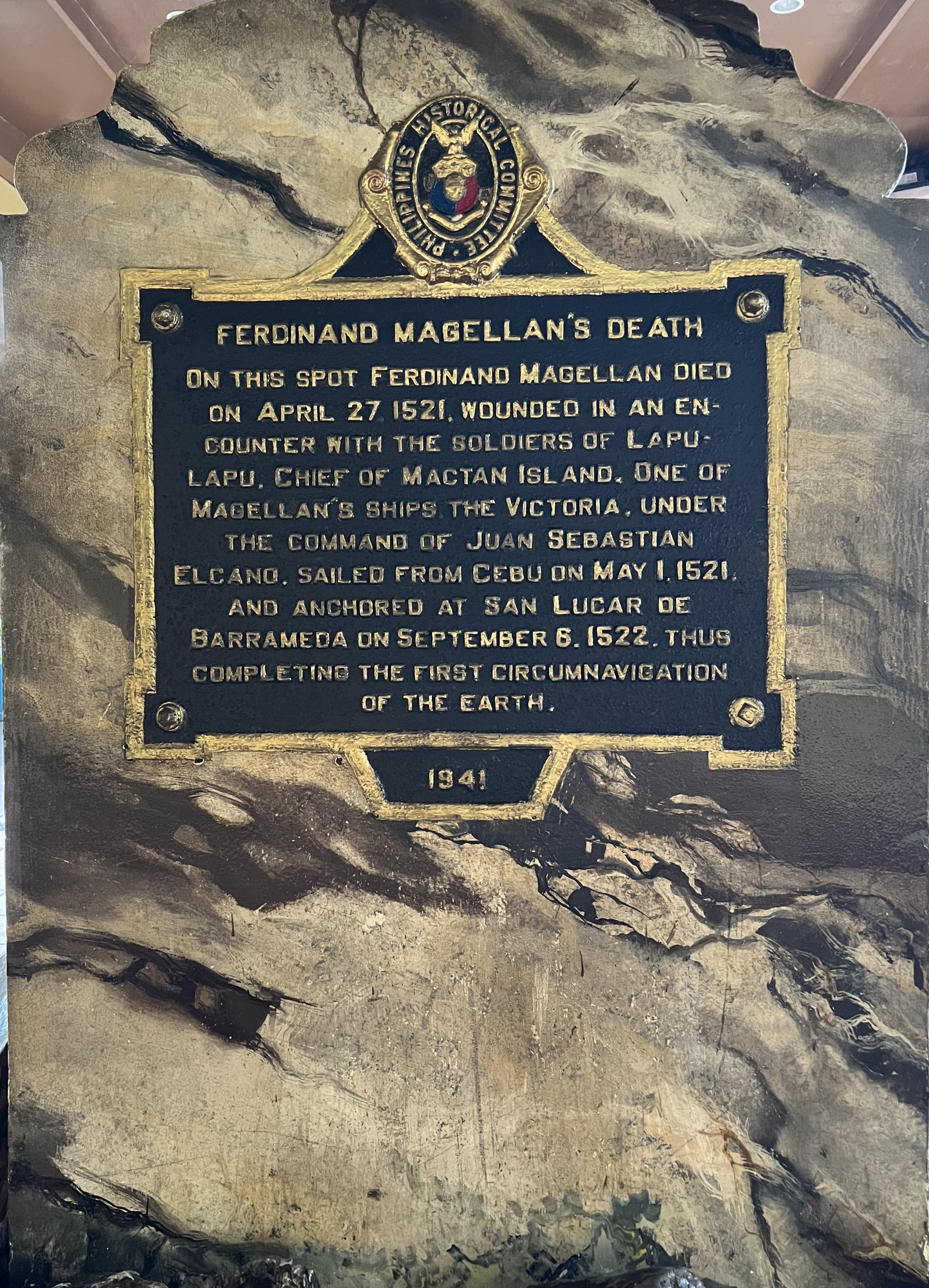
Plaque commemorating the site where Ferdinand Magellan was killed

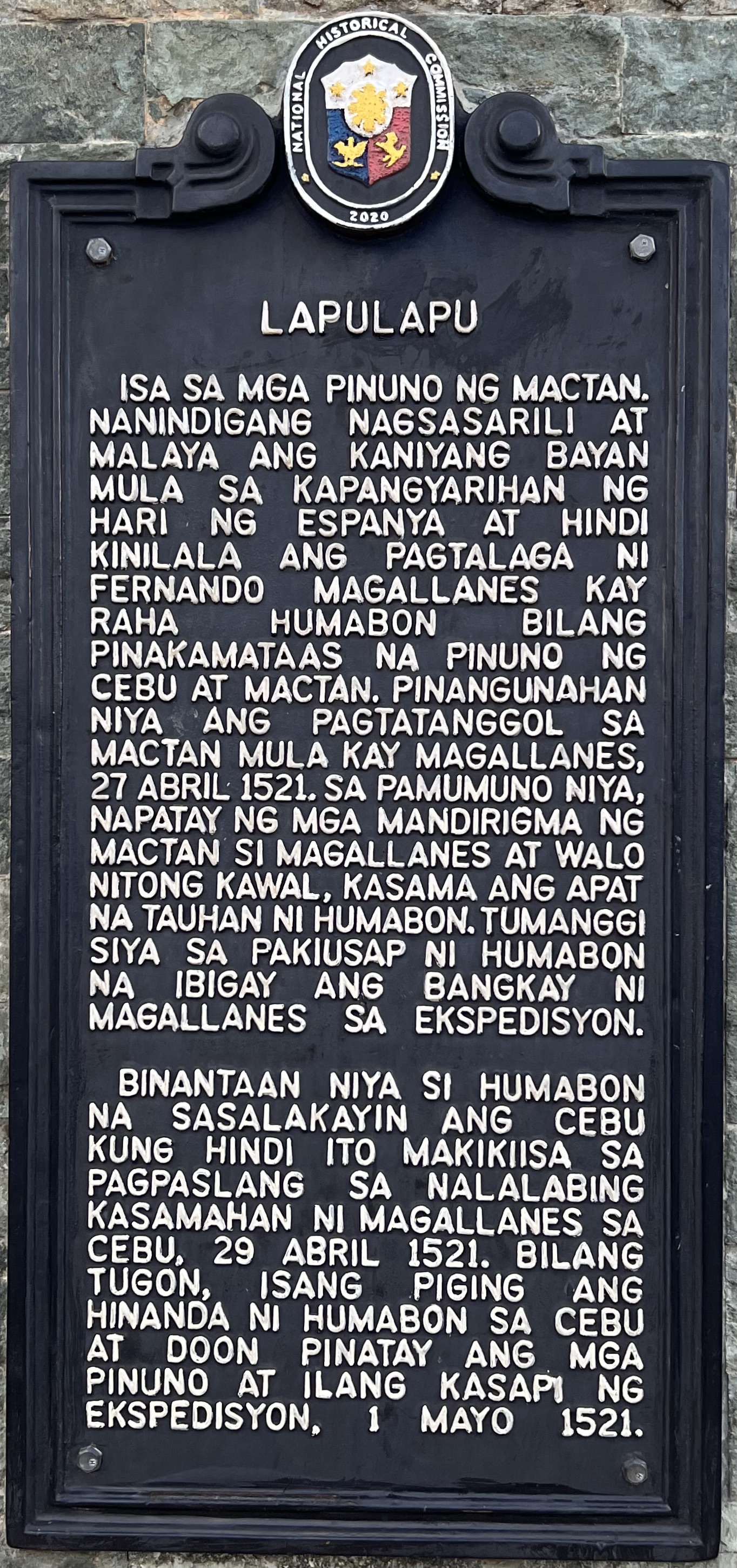
Plaque located at the base of the Lapulapu Monument

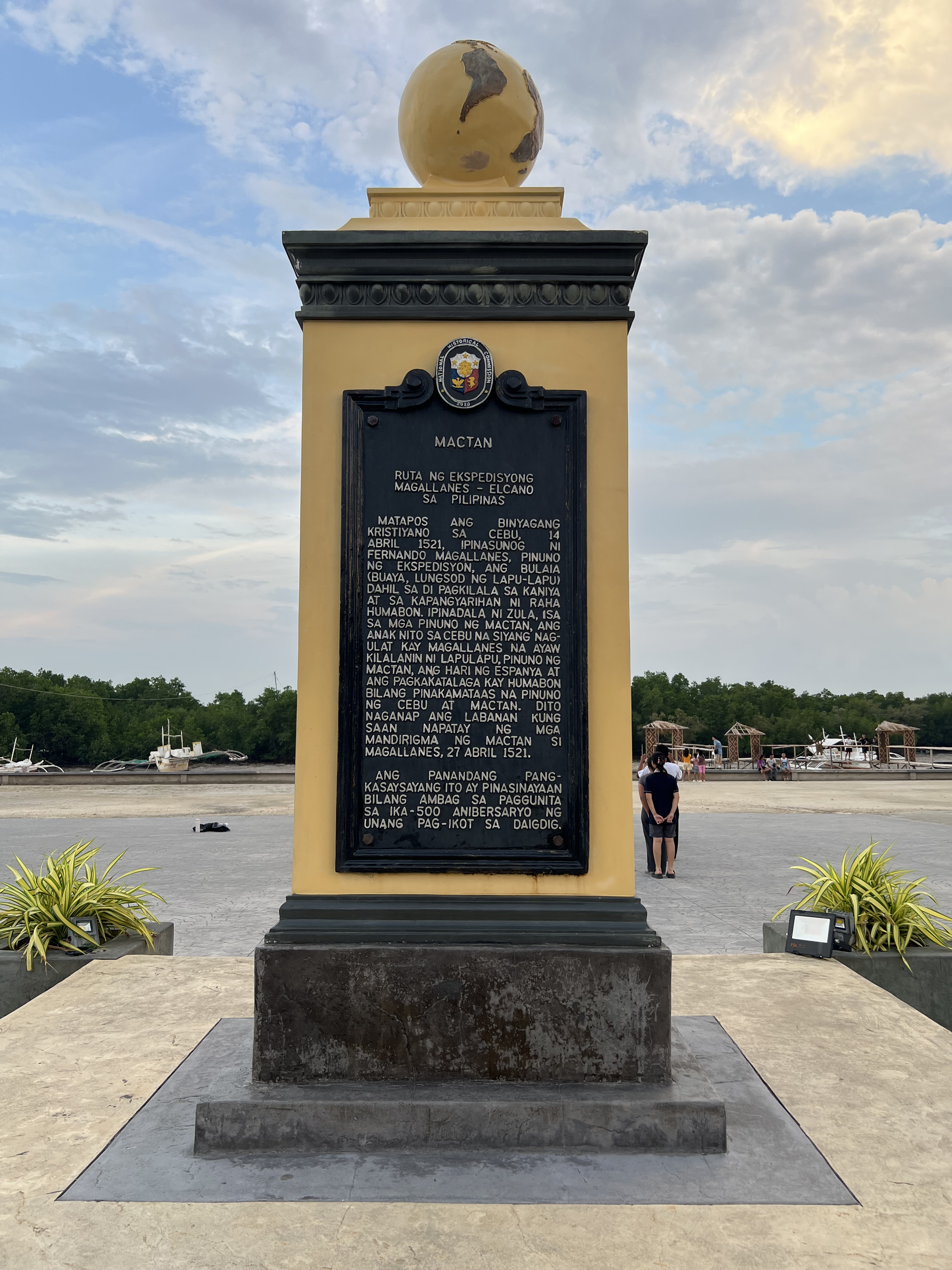
Philippine Quincentennial Marker

== Future monument and museum ==
The Lapu-Lapu Memorial Shrine and Museum is a proposed structure to be built inside the Mactan Shrine. The structure will be built on the shore adjacent to the Mactan Shrine. A new Lapu-Lapu monument will be built inside the structure with the winning entry of a design competition to be used a basis for the monument's design. The existing Lapu-Lapu statue will be kept intact. The groundbreaking is scheduled to take place on April 27, 2021.
