= Battle of Mactan =

1521 battle between Ferdinand Magellan and Lapulapu

Coordinates: 10.3106°N 124.0151°E

- Part of Magellan-Elcano expedition
| Date | April 27, 1521 |
| Location | Mactan Island, Cebu, Philippines |
| Result | Mactan victory |

Belligerents
| Kedatuan of Mactan | Spanish Empire; Rajahnate of Cebu |

Commanders and leaders
| Lapulapu | Ferdinand Magellan †; Humabon; Zula |

Strength
| 1,500 (Pigafetta's account)–3,000 | 60 Europeans (Pigafetta's account) (49 engaged, 11 left in boats); large number of natives on the Spanish side |

Casualties and losses
| 15 dead | 12 dead |

Location map

The Battle of Mactan (Filipino: Labanan sa Mactan; Spanish: Batalla de Mactán) was fought on a beach in Mactan Island (now part of Cebu, Philippines) between Spanish forces led by the Portuguese explorer Ferdinand Magellan, along with local allies, and Lapulapu, a chieftain of the island, on the early morning of April 27, 1521. Magellan, a Portuguese-born commander serving the Spanish Empire who led an expedition that ultimately circumnavigated the world for the first time, commanded a small Spanish contingent in an effort to subdue Mactan under the Spanish crown. The sheer number of Lapulapu's forces, compounded with issues associated with the location and the armor, ultimately resulted in a disastrous defeat for the Europeans and the death of Magellan. Surviving members of Magellan's crew continued the expedition under the command of Juan Sebastian de Elcano, who completed the journey in September 1522.

The battle's exact details are lost to history, with Antonio Pigafetta's account as the only source of much of the information known today. It is remembered in the Philippines as the first battle won by a native Filipino against Spanish forces, with Lapulapu being hailed as the country's first national hero. The Spanish Empire would continue to send expeditions to the archipelago with little to no success until Miguel Lopez de Legazpi's expedition to Cebu and Manila in 1565, starting a 333-year Spanish rule on the archipelago.

== Background ==
Magellan's expedition had left Spain in August 1519 on a mission to find a westward route to the Moluccas or Spice Islands. On March 16, 1521 (Julian calendar), Magellan sighted the mountains of what is now Samar, marking the first documented arrival of Europeans in the archipelago. The following day Magellan ordered his men to anchor their ships on the shores of Homonhon Island.

Magellan befriended Rajah Kolambu and Rajah Siagu, king of Limasawa, who guided him to Cebu, where he met Rajah Humabon, the Rajah of Cebu. Rajah Humabon and his queen were baptized into the Catholic faith, taking the Christian names Carlos, in honor of King Charles I of Spain, and Juana, in honor of King Charles' mother, Joanna the Mad. To commemorate this event, Magellan gave Juana the Santo Niño, an image of the infant Jesus, as a symbol of their new alliance and held their first Mass on the coast.

As a result of Magellan's influence with Rajah Humabon, an order was issued to each of the nearby chiefs to provide food supplies for the ships and to convert to Christianity. Most chiefs obeyed, but Datu Lapulapu, one of the two chiefs on the island of Mactan, refused to accept the authority of Rajah Humabon in these matters. This opposition proved influential. Antonio Pigafetta, Magellan's voyage chronicler, wrote that Zula, the island's other chief, sent one of his sons to Magellan with gifts but Lapulapu prevented the journey and refused to swear fealty to Spain.

Rajah Humabon and Datu Zula suggested that Magellan go to Mactan to force the Datu's compliance. Magellan saw an opportunity to strengthen the existing friendship ties with the ruler of the Visayan region and agreed to help him subdue the resistant Lapulapu.

== Battle ==
Upon landing, Magellan's small force was immediately attacked by the natives with a heavy barrage of ranged weapons, consisting of arrows, iron-tipped "bamboo" throwing spears (probably rattan bangkaw), fire-hardened sticks, and even stones. They surrounded Magellan's landing party, attacking from the front and both flanks. The heavy armor of the Spaniards largely protected them from this barrage, inflicting only a handful of fatalities on the Europeans, but it was heavily demoralizing on the troops.

The musketeers and crossbowmen on the boat tried to provide support by firing from the boats. Though the light armor and the shields of the natives were vulnerable to European projectile weapons, the barrage had little effect, as they were firing from an extreme distance and the natives easily avoided them. Also due to the distance, Magellan could not command them to stop and save their ammunition, and the musketeers and crossbowmen continued firing for half an hour until their ammunition was exhausted.

Magellan, hoping to ease the attack, set fire to some of the houses, but this only enraged the natives. Magellan was finally hit with a poisoned arrow through his unarmored legs, whereupon the natives charged the Europeans for close-quarters combat.

Many of the warriors specifically attacked Magellan. In the struggle, he was wounded in the arm with a spear and in the leg by a large native sword (likely a kampilan). Those who stood beside him were easily overpowered and killed, while others who tried to help him were hacked with spears and swords. With this advantage, Lapulapu's troops finally overwhelmed and killed Magellan. Pigafetta and a few others managed to escape.

According to Pigafetta, several of Magellan's men were killed in battle, and a number of native converts to Catholicism who had come to their aid were immediately killed by the warriors.

Magellan's allies, Humabon and Zula, were said to not have participated in the battle, at Magellan's bidding. They watched from a distance.

== Magellan's death according to Antonio Pigafetta's journal ==
The only known primary source of the Magellan expedition, Primo viaggio intorno al mondo (English: First Voyage Around the World), contains Pigafetta's personal recount and vivid description of Ferdinand Magellan's death.

A manuscript of the original copy of Primo viaggio intorno al mondo – written by Pigafetta between 1522–1525

As related in EyeWitness to history, Pigafetta writes that Magellan, in an attempt to show his power and frighten the local Mactan tribes into obedience, took most of his men to storm the beach and attack the natives, ordering the men on his ship to fire upon the natives with muskets and cannons. However, he had not taken into account the reef between the ship and the beach; the shots fell short.

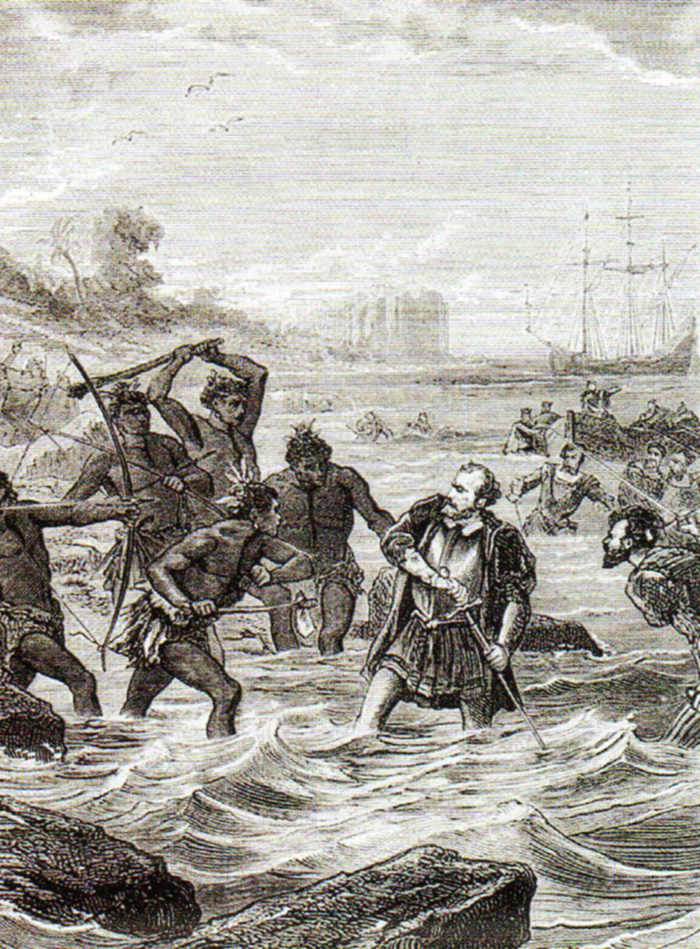
Ferdinand Magellan's final stand

Upon seeing this, the furious Mactans fired arrows back at Magellan. His response was to send a few men to burn down the natives' houses, but this only further enraged the natives, who then rushed Magellan's men and hurled spears and arrows at the Spaniards' vulnerable legs. Amidst the chaos, Magellan's right leg was wounded with a poisoned arrow. He ordered his men to retreat, but they ignored him and continued the battle.

With both parties refusing to back down, the battle lasted for over an hour. After Magellan sustained a significant injury to his arm, the natives focused their attack on him. After being wounded in his left leg, Magellan collapsed. Multiple Mactan warriors then rushed him with spears and killed him.

=== Aftermath ===
Datu Lapulapu's warriors recovered Magellan's body. Humabon demanded the bodies of Magellan and of some of his crew in return for as much merchandise as the warriors wished, but they refused. Some of the soldiers who survived the battle and returned to Cebu were poisoned at a feast given by Humabon.

Juan Sebastián Elcano succeeded Magellan as commander of the expedition. After the betrayal by Humabon, he ordered an immediate departure. Elcano and his fleet sailed west and reached Spain in 1522, completing the first circumnavigation of the world.

== In Philippine culture ==
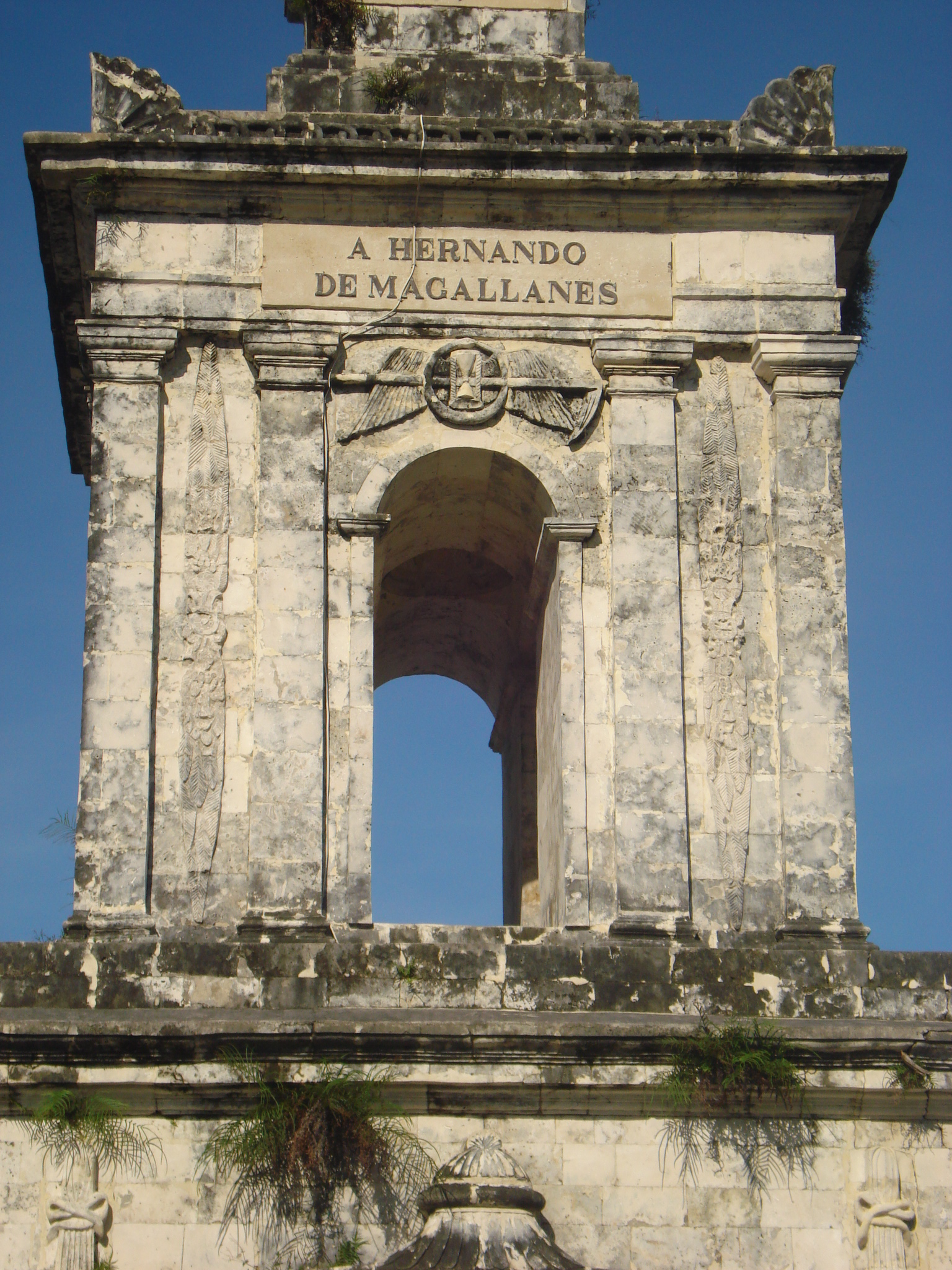
The memorial to Magellan built by the Spanish.

In Philippine history, the "victory of Mactan" is considered to have delayed the Spanish colonization of the Philippines by 44 years until the conquest by Miguel López de Legazpi in 1564–1565. Today, Lapulapu is retroactively honored as the first "Philippine national hero" to resist foreign rule.

Lapulapu is remembered by a number of commemorations: statues on the island of Mactan and at the Cebu Provincial Capitol, a city bearing his name, and a local variety of Red Grouper fish. Kapampangan actor-turned-politician Lito Lapid starred in a film called Lapu-Lapu, and novelty singer Yoyoy Villame wrote a folk song entitled "Magellan" that tells a humorously distorted story of the Battle of Mactan.

There is a spot in Mactan Island called the "Mactan shrine" where the historic battle is reenacted along the mangrove shorelines of the shrine during its anniversary and culminated with the Rampada Festival, a festival reenacting the victory celebration of Mactan after the battle. Appropriately called the "Victory of Mactan" (Cebuano: Kadaugan sa Mactan), the reenactment is considered as a grand celebration for Cebuanos and one of Cebu's prime festivals together with the Sinulog of Cebu. Usually, during the re-enactment, Filipino celebrities, especially of Cebuano origin, play Lapu-Lapu, his wife Reyna Bulakna, and Ferdinand Magellan.

In 2017, in honoring Lapulapu as the first hero who resisted foreign rule in the country, the date April 27 when the battle took place was declared by President Rodrigo Duterte as Lapulapu Day.
