= Culasi =

Municipality in Antique, Philippines

- Municipality
- Municipality of Culasi
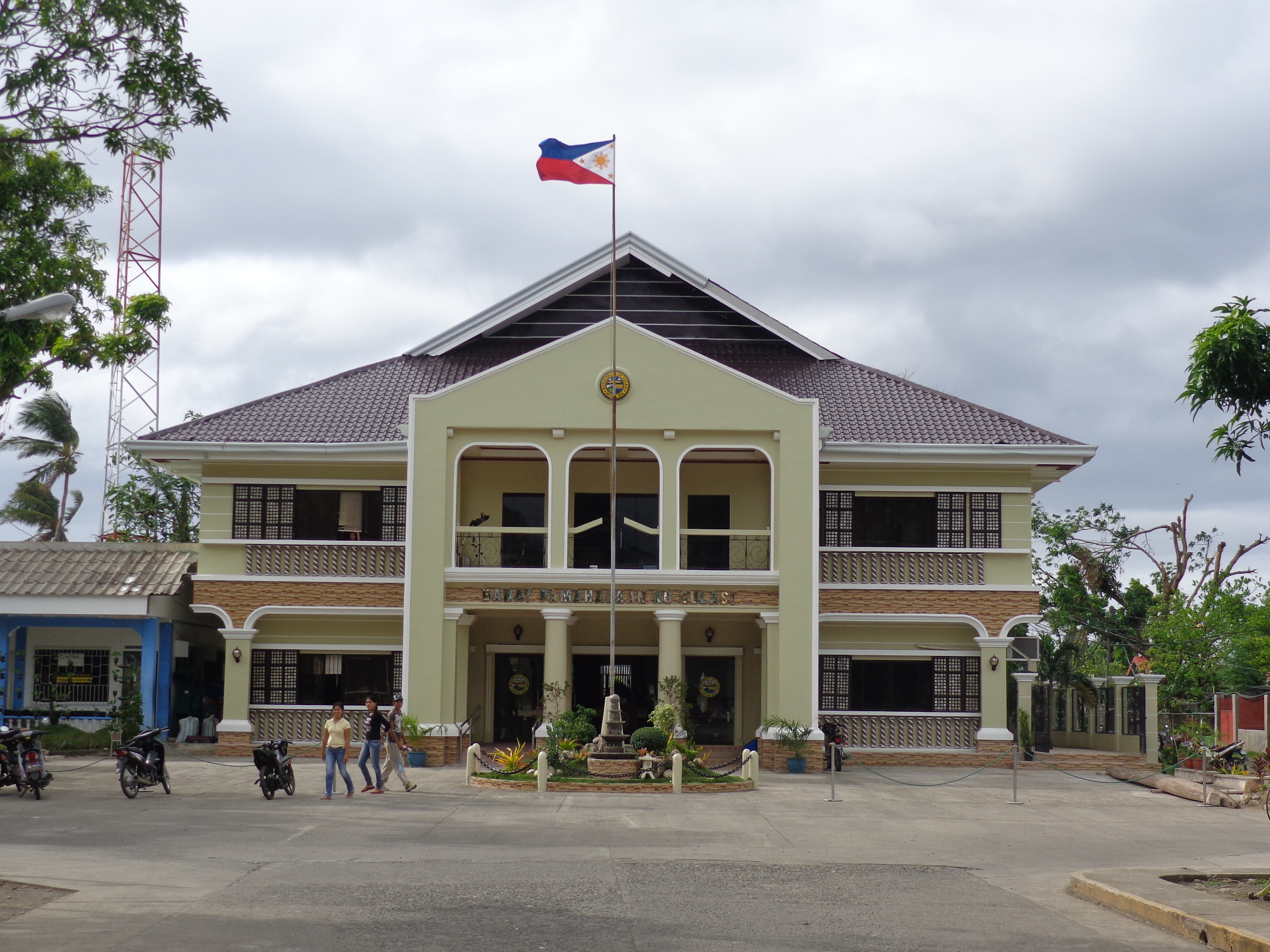
- Municipal Hall of Culasi

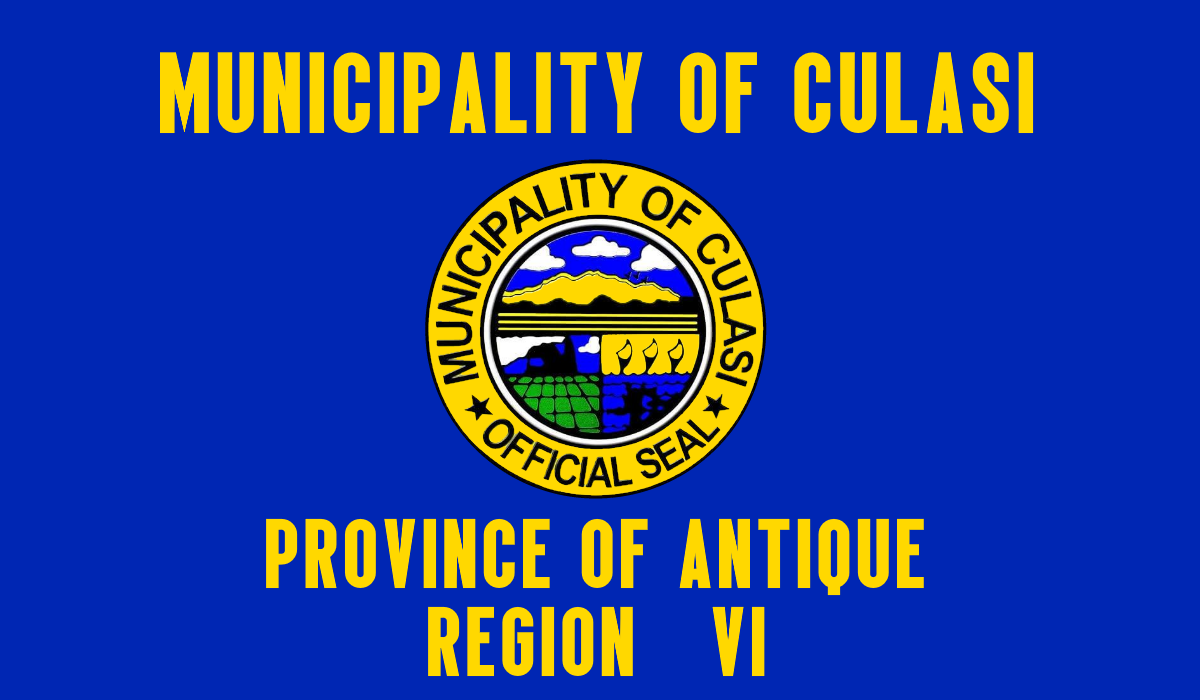
- Flag

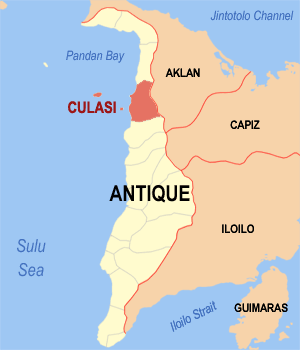
- Map of Antique with Culasi highlighted
- Interactive map of Culasi
- Location within the Philippines
- Coordinates: 11°25′38″N 122°03′22″E
- Country: Philippines
- Region: Western Visayas
- Province: Antique
- District: Lone district
- Barangays: 44 (see Barangays)

Government
  - Type: Sangguniang Bayan
  - Mayor: Joel A. Lomugdang
  - Vice Mayor: Pete Joseph L. Rivera
  - Representative: Antonio Legarda Jr.
  - Municipal Council: Members: May C. alorro; Larry John B. Alocilja; Erwin Sumugat; Alissia Dy Buco; July Dimacutac; Larry James D. Salazar; Rosene M. AlvareZ
  - Electorate: 29,441 voters (Philippine general election, 2025)

Area
  - Total: 228.56 km^{2} (88.25 sq mi)
- Elevation: 103 m (338 ft)
- Highest elevation (Mount Madja-as): 2,117 m (6,946 ft)
- Lowest elevation: 0 m (0 ft)

Population (2024 census)
  - Total: 46,442
  - Density: 203.19/km^{2} (526.27/sq mi)
  - Households: 11,075

Economy
  - Income class: 1st municipal income class
  - Poverty incidence: 18.89% (2023)
  - Revenue: ₱ 236.2 million (2024)
  - Assets: ₱ 886.4 million (2024)
  - Expenditure: ₱ 81.46 million (2024)
  - Liabilities: ₱ 383.8 million (2024)

Service provider
  - Electricity: Antique Electric Cooperative (ANTECO)
- Time zone: UTC+8 (PST)
- ZIP code: 5708
- PSGC: 0600606000
- IDD : area code: +63 (0)36
- Native languages: Karay-a; Hiligaynon; Ati; Tagalog
- Website: culasiantique.gov.ph

Culasi, officially the Municipality of Culasi (Kinaray-a: Banwa kang Culasi; Hiligaynon: Banwa sang Culasi; Tagalog: Bayan ng Culasi), is a 1st class municipality in the province of Antique, Philippines. According to the 2024 census, it has a population of 46,442 people, making it fourth most populous municipality in the province of Antique and third largest municipality in terms of land area, with a total area of 228.56 square kilometers.

It is known as the home of majestic Mount Madja-as, the highest peak in Panay. It is also famous for its mossy forest, sea of clouds and 14 waterfalls, with an elevation of 6,946 ft (2,117 m) above sea level. Madja-as is an enchanted mountain sacred to ancient Visayans as it is home to the god of death, Sidapa, and god of meteors, Bulalakaw.

== Etymology ==
The name Culasi or Kulasi was derived from the local term for a species of mangrove Lumnitzera racemosa which grow abundantly in the vicinity's river basin.

== History ==
=== Spanish colonial times ===
During the Spanish colonial times, Culasi was known by its old name "Bacong". Now, Bacong is only one of its barangays. Bacong was one of the four visitas or towns established by the Spaniards. The others were Nalupa (now Barbaza), Bugason (now Bugasong), and Hamtik (now Hamtic).

The 1905 census revealed that Culasi had the biggest Chinese population in Antique, so much so that it had a barrio named "Villa de Hong Kong" in their honor. It is now part of the Poblacion.

=== 1981 Bacong Bridge Massacre ===
One of the significant events of the Philippines's Martial Law era was the Bacong Bridge Massacre, which took place in Culasi on December 19, 1981. Sometimes also known as the Culasi incident, it involved the Philippine Constabulary killing 5 protester-farmers at the Bacong River bridge in Barangay Malacañang, Culasi, Antique. The victims were identified as Leopoldo A. Anos, Aquilino M. Castillo, Fortunato M. Dalisay, Remegildo P. Dalisay, and Joel B. Plaquino.

== Geography ==
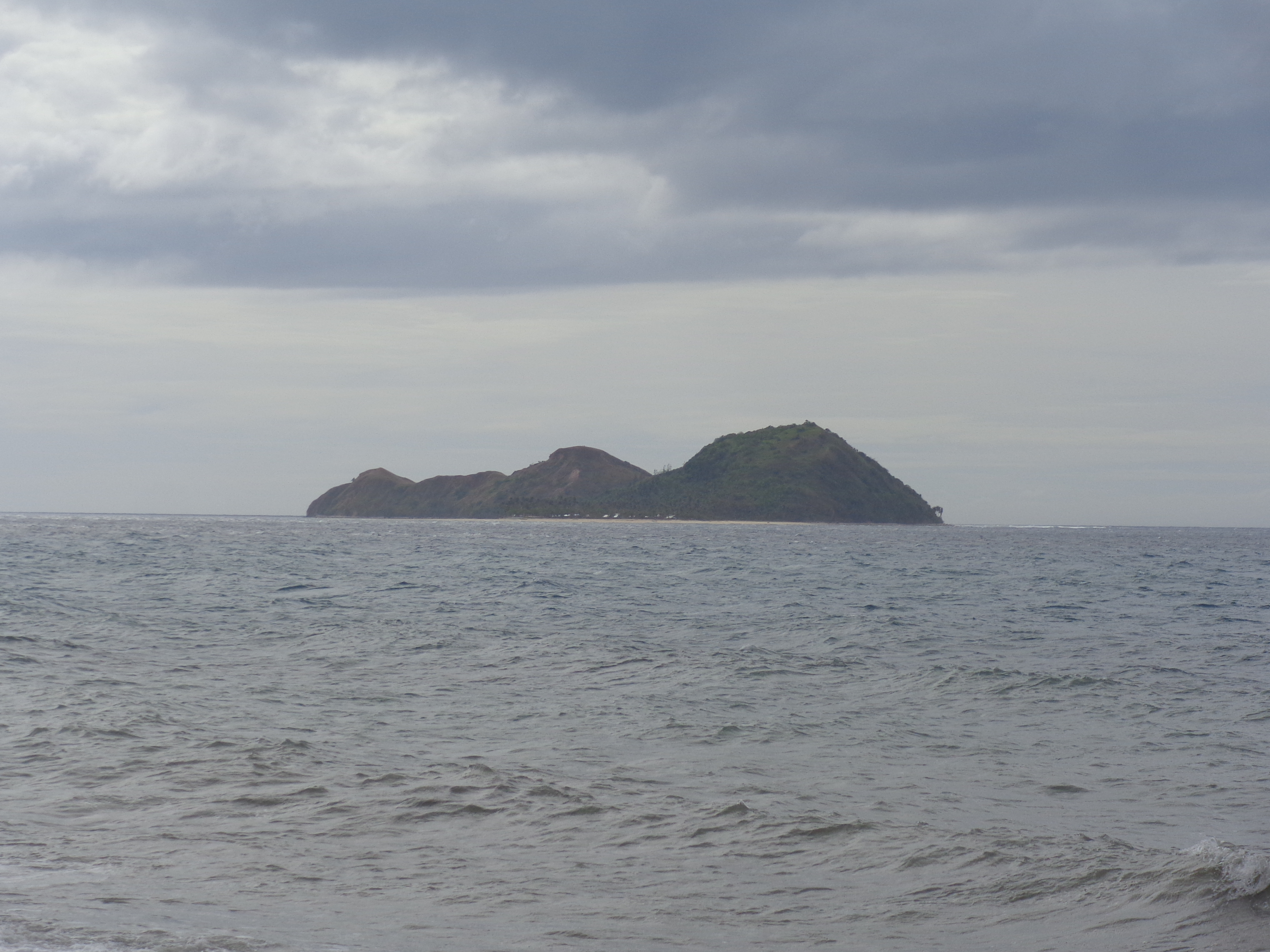
Mararison Island seen from Culasi

Culasi is 92 kilometres (57 mi) north from San Jose de Buenavista, the capital of Antique, and 90 kilometres (56 mi) south from Kalibo, the capital of Aklan.

According to the Philippine Statistics Authority, the municipality has a land area of 228.56 square kilometres (88.25 sq mi) constituting 8.37% of the 2,729.17-square-kilometre- (1,053.74 sq mi) total area of Antique.

Located in the northern portion of the province, it is bounded on the north by Sebaste, south by Tibiao, west by the Sulu Sea and east by Mount Madja-as and the Municipality of Madalag, Aklan, just beyond. Its territory includes Maniguin (or Maningning / Hammerhead) and Batbatan Islands.

Excluding the outlying islands, its northernmost point is located at 11°32’05" latitude and 122°05’00" longitude. Its easternmost point is located at 11°30’50" latitude and 122°10’05" longitude. Its southernmost point is located at 11°21’04" latitude and 122°02’08" longitude and the westernmost point is at 11°31’05" latitude and 122°03’08" longitude.

=== Barangays ===
Culasi is politically subdivided into 44 barangays. Each barangay consists of puroks and some have sitios.

These barangays are classified into 3 island, 11 upland, 16 coastal and 14 interior/lowland barangays.

PSGC	Barangay	Population			±% p.a.	
		2024		2010		
060606001	Alojipan	1.0%	462	446	▴	0.25%
060606002	Bagacay	3.2%	1,480	1,462	▴	0.09%
060606003	Balac-balac	1.4%	660	601	▴	0.65%
060606005	Batbatan Island	6.1%	2,851	2,407	▴	1.19%
060606007	Batonan Norte	1.3%	620	608	▴	0.14%
060606008	Batonan Sur	1.6%	749	730	▴	0.18%
060606009	Bita	0.9%	431	410	▴	0.35%
060606010	Bitadton Norte	1.7%	788	711	▴	0.72%
060606011	Bitadton Sur	4.7%	2,166	2,075	▴	0.30%
060606012	Buenavista	1.6%	726	683	▴	0.43%
060606013	Buhi	1.3%	619	582	▴	0.43%
060606014	Camancijan	4.2%	1,938	1,901	▴	0.13%
060606015	Caridad	1.9%	882	828	▴	0.44%
060606016	Carit-an	1.4%	628	518	▴	1.35%
060606032	Centro Norte (Poblacion)	4.6%	2,114	1,947	▴	0.57%
060606031	Centro Poblacion	5.3%	2,477	2,668	▾	−0.52%
060606033	Centro Sur (Poblacion)	3.6%	1,654	1,791	▾	−0.55%
060606017	Condes	0.9%	420	389	▴	0.54%
060606018	Esperanza	2.4%	1,132	1,029	▴	0.67%
060606019	Fe	1.7%	770	678	▴	0.89%
060606020	Flores	1.8%	822	804	▴	0.15%
060606021	Jalandoni	3.2%	1,485	1,384	▴	0.49%
060606022	Janlagasi	0.5%	215	204	▴	0.37%
060606023	Lamputong	1.4%	628	617	▴	0.12%
060606024	Lipata	4.2%	1,962	1,831	▴	0.48%
060606004	Magsaysay (Balua)	1.2%	578	524	▴	0.69%
060606025	Malacañang	3.4%	1,572	1,466	▴	0.49%
060606026	Malalison Island	1.4%	649	584	▴	0.74%
060606027	Maniguin	1.5%	719	643	▴	0.78%
060606028	Naba	3.5%	1,628	999	▴	3.46%
060606029	Osorio	1.1%	524	485	▴	0.54%
060606030	Paningayan	0.8%	354	330	▴	0.49%
060606034	Salde	0.4%	203	121	▴	3.67%
060606036	San Antonio	2.1%	962	1,664	▾	−3.75%
060606037	San Gregorio	1.0%	476	450	▴	0.39%
060606038	San Juan	1.6%	751	632	▴	1.21%
060606039	San Luis	1.5%	715	696	▴	0.19%
060606040	San Pascual	0.9%	416	384	▴	0.56%
060606041	San Vicente	0.9%	396	390	▴	0.11%
060606042	Simbola	0.5%	229	201	▴	0.91%
060606043	Tigbobolo	1.0%	460	423	▴	0.59%
060606044	Tinabusan	0.4%	177	167	▴	0.41%
060606045	Tomao	1.6%	751	667	▴	0.83%
060606046	Valderama	2.1%	989	956	▴	0.24%
	Total		46,442	39,086	▴	1.21%

=== Climate ===
Climate data for Culasi, Antique
Month	Jan	Feb	Mar	Apr	May	Jun	Jul	Aug	Sep	Oct	Nov	Dec	Year
Mean daily maximum °C (°F)	29 (84)	30 (86)	31 (88)	33 (91)	32 (90)	30 (86)	29 (84)	29 (84)	29 (84)	29 (84)	29 (84)	29 (84)	30 (86)
Mean daily minimum °C (°F)	22 (72)	22 (72)	22 (72)	24 (75)	25 (77)	25 (77)	25 (77)	25 (77)	25 (77)	24 (75)	24 (75)	23 (73)	24 (75)
Average precipitation mm (inches)	64 (2.5)	44 (1.7)	58 (2.3)	83 (3.3)	204 (8.0)	304 (12.0)	334 (13.1)	291 (11.5)	310 (12.2)	281 (11.1)	172 (6.8)	97 (3.8)	2,242 (88.3)
Average rainy days	12.5	8.9	11.3	14.1	24.2	28.0	29.6	28.2	28.1	28.1	20.2	15.2	248.4
Source: Meteoblue (modeled/calculated data, not measured locally)

Culasi has two distinct seasons, the rainy and dry. Rainy season occurs in the months of May to November and dry season for the rest of the year. Areas like the mountainous barangays of Flores and Osorio located at the southern portion of the municipality are characterized by a relatively cool temperature which is highly suited for coffee. The higher precipitation acquired may be caused by high mountain range or because of its high topography.

=== Islands land area ===
- Batbatan Island 4.64 km^{2} (1.79 sq mi)
- Maniguin Island 1.21 km^{2} (0.47 sq mi)
- Mararison Island 0.55 km^{2} (0.21 sq mi)

=== Topography ===
Culasi has a slope of 8°. Eastern height ranges from 200 metres (660 ft) to 2,117 metres (6,946 ft) at the summit of Mount Madia-as, it is the highest point in Panay. It has unbroken mountain range from barangay Batonan Sur in the south to barangay Salde in the northernmost. From the peak of Madia-as Mountain it gradually flattens down to a narrow strip of the coastal plain. Land area roughly covers 82.92% upland and above lowland comprises 17.08% of the land area with a slope of 18% and below. Forest areas comprise almost half of the total land area covering 12,078 hectares (29,850 acres).

== Demographics ==
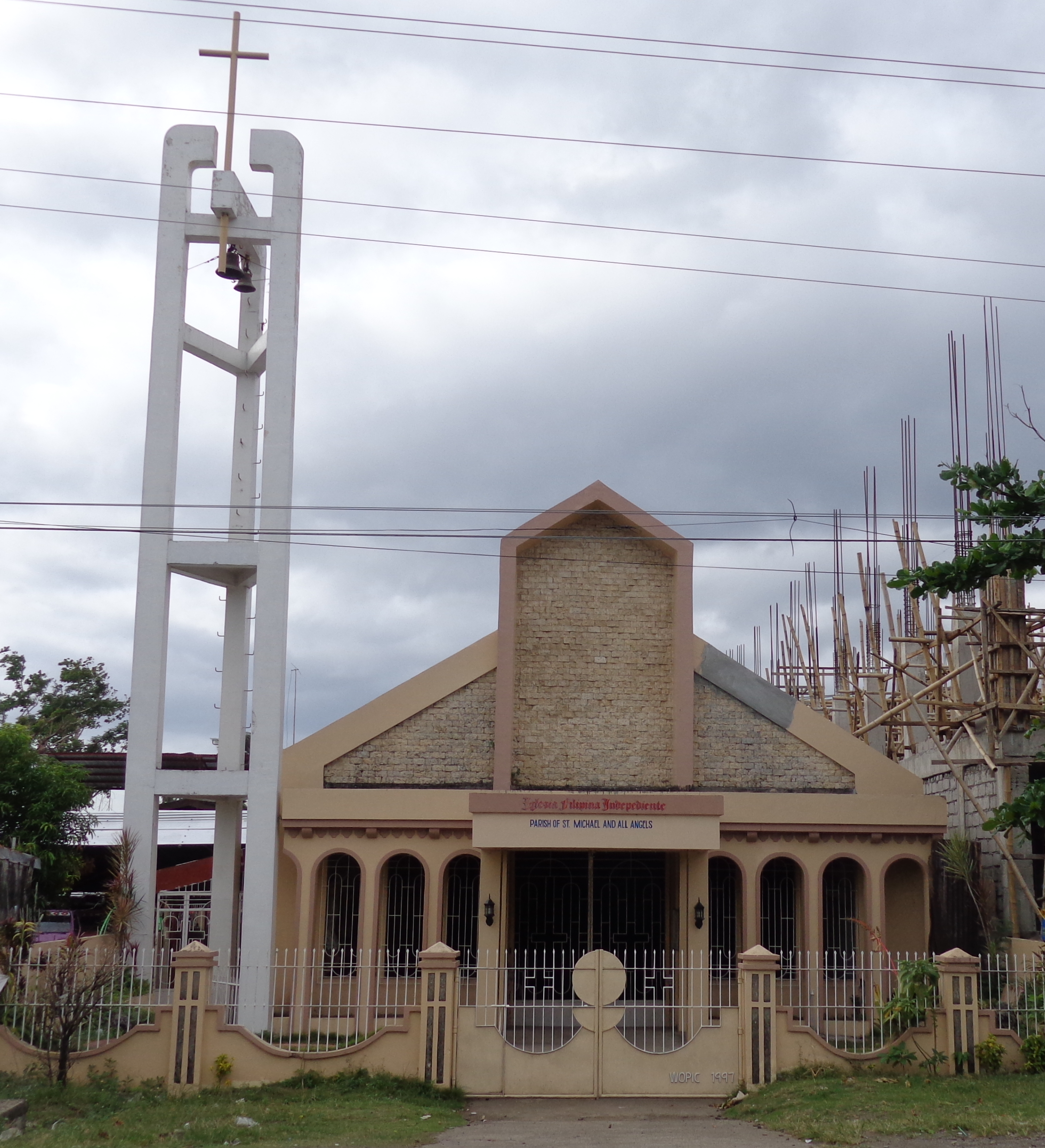
Saint Michael and All Angels Parish Church of the Iglesia Filipina Independiente

Population census of Culasi

Year	Pop.	±% p.a.
1903	10,966	—
1918	15,790	+2.46%
1939	19,019	+0.89%
1948	20,601	+0.89%
1960	23,923	+1.25%
1970	22,621	−0.56%
1975	23,584	+0.84%
1980	25,674	+1.71%

Year	Pop.	±% p.a.
1990	29,719	+1.47%
1995	30,431	+0.44%
2000	34,732	+2.87%
2007	37,100	+0.91%
2010	39,086	+1.92%
2015	41,228	+1.02%
2020	44,494	+1.62%
2024	46,442	+1.03%

Source: Philippine Statistics Authority

In the 2024 census, Culasi had a population of 46,442 people. The population density was 190 inhabitants per square kilometre (490/sq mi).

== Economy ==
Poverty incidence of Culasi

Source: Philippine Statistics Authority

Farming and fishing are the major livelihood where the Culasinhon depend their living.

=== Natural resources ===
The rolling hills of Mount Madja-as are rich in manganese, copper and coal found in Timbaban. Other metallic mineral deposits are white clay and pebbles in the island barangays of Malalison and Batbatan. Sand and gravel is being extracted in various rivers and used for infrastructure. Another metallic mineral is the limestone deposit found in Sitio Bula, Camancijan and is used for agricultural and industrial purpose. Limestone is used in the production of cement.

Most treasured one is the oil deposit in Maniguin Island explored by the Philippine National Oil Corporation (PNOC). Several companies drilled oil deposit in Maniguin with black coal. Maniguin has a potential reserve of 28 to 250 million barrels (4.5 to 40 million cubic metres) of oil, based on the PNOC drilling project report.

== Infrastructure ==
=== Communication ===
Landline service is provided by Panay Telephone. Mobile service include Smart Communications, Globe Telecom, and Dito Telecommunity. Postal Services are provided by PhilPost.

== Education ==
The Culasi Schools District Office governs all educational institutions within the municipality. It oversees the management and operations of all private and public, from primary to secondary schools.

=== Pre-schools ===
- Culasi Christian Learning Center
- Culasi Cooperative Learning Center
- Day Care Centers
- Saint Michael Parochial Kindergarten School
- Seaside Baptist Learning Center

=== Primary and elementary schools ===
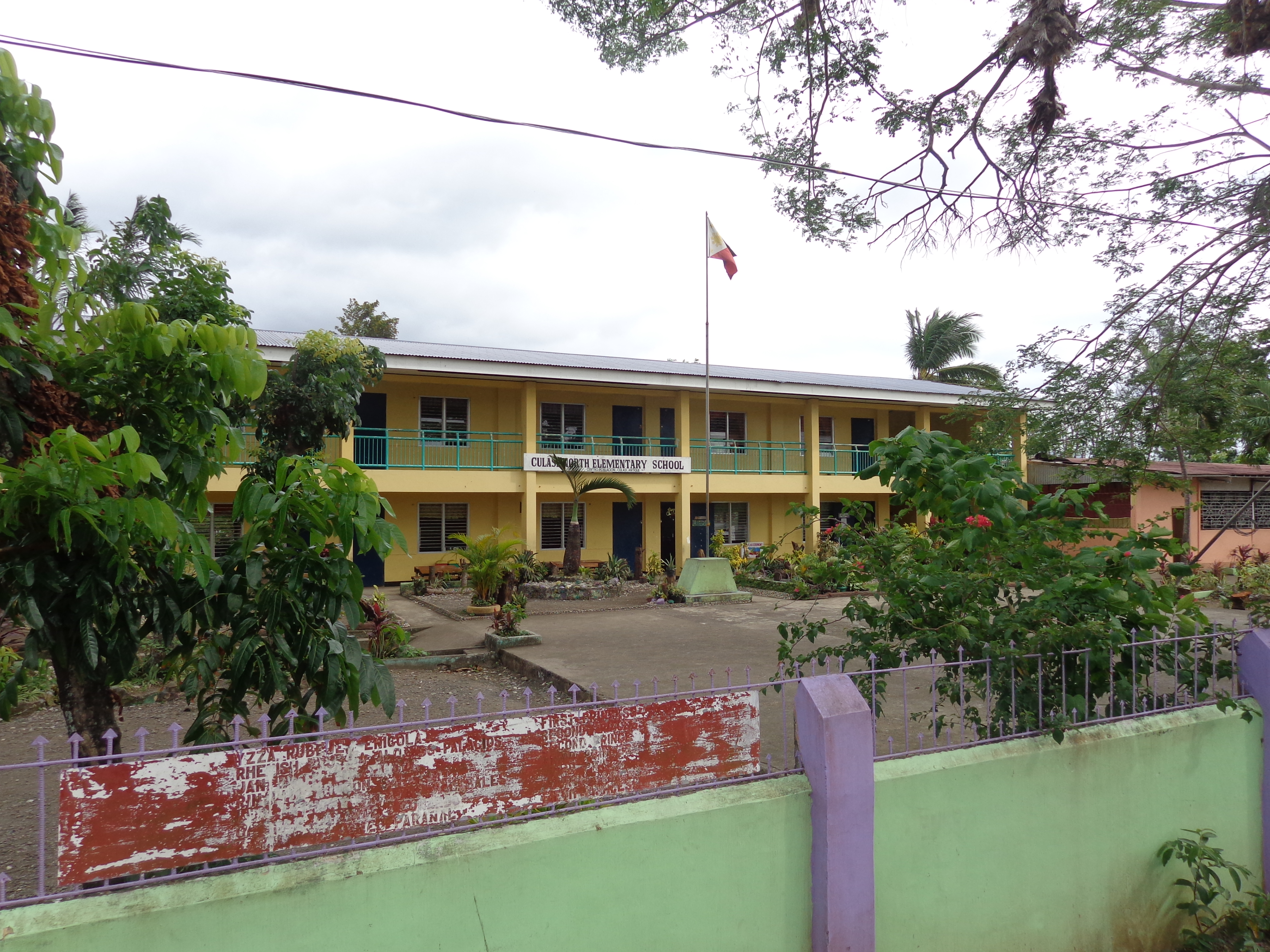
Culasi North Elementary School

- Alojipan Primary School
- Bagacay Elementary School
- Balac-Balac Primary School
- Batbatan Elementary School
- Batonan Norte Elementary School
- Batonan Sur Primary School
- Bitadton Elementary School
- Buenavista Elementary School
- Buhi Elementary School
- Camancijan Elementary School
- Carit-an Elementary School
- Culasi Central School
- Culasi North Elementary School
- Esperanza Elementary School
- Fe-Caridad Elementary School
- Flores Elementary School
- Kawit Elementary School
- Kawit Integrated School
- Light Bearer's Fundamental Baptist Learning Center
- Mag-ayad Primary School
- Magsaysay Elementary School
- Malacañang Elementary School
- Malalison Elementary School
- Maniguin Elementary School
- Naba Primary School
- Osorio Elementary School
- Paningayan Primary School
- Saint Michael the Archangel Grade School
- San Antonio Elementary School
- San Juan Elementary School
- San Luis-Condes Elementary School
- San Pascual Primary School
- San Vicente Elementary School
- Tomao Primary School
- Valderrama Elementary School

=== Secondary schools ===
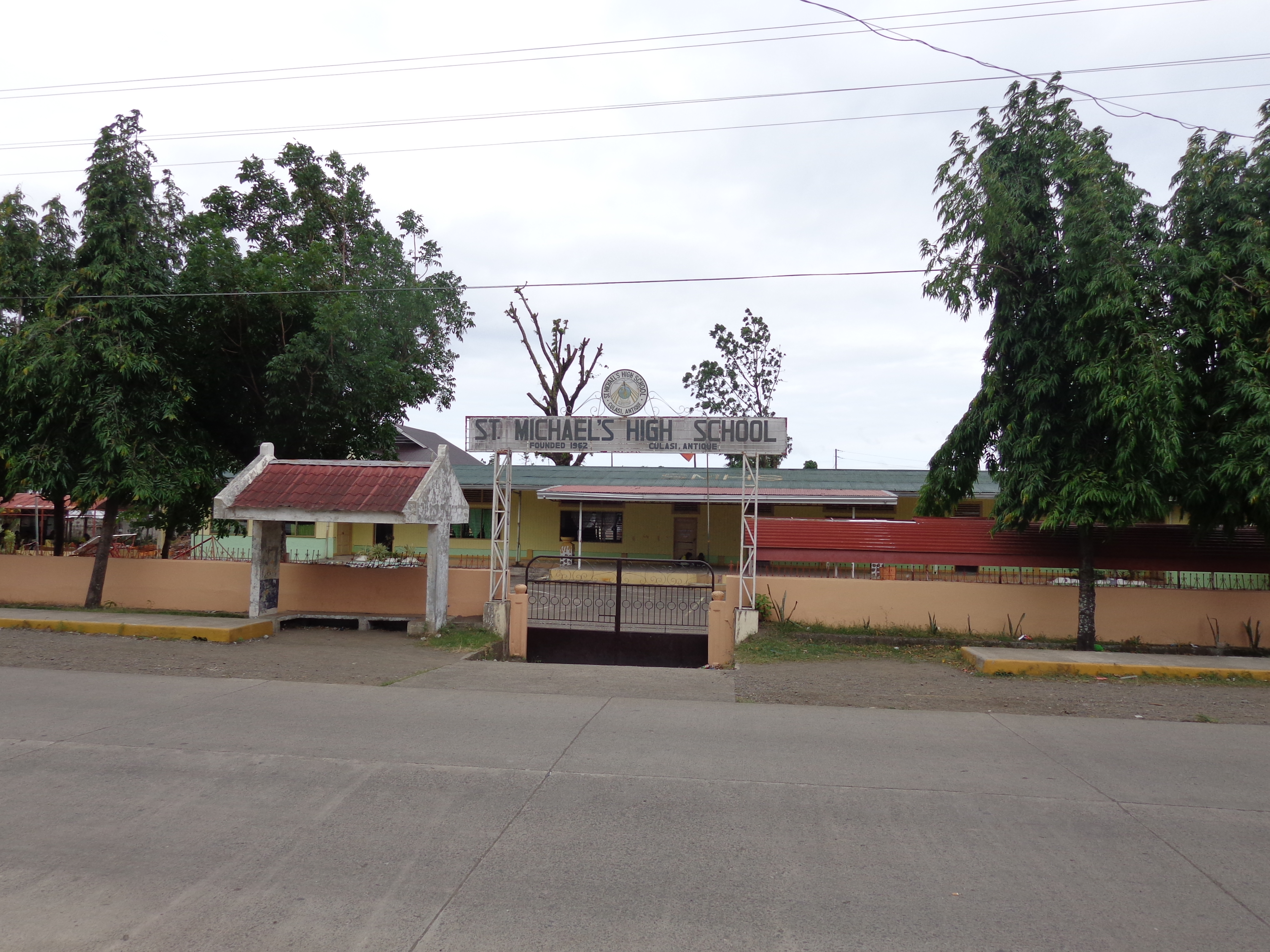
Saint Michael High School of Culasi

- Bitadton National High School
- Kawit Integrated School
- Lipata - Lamputong Integrated School
- Northern Antique Vocational School
- Saint Michael High School
- San Antonio National High School

=== Higher educational institution ===
- Vicente A. Javier Memorial Community College

== Media ==
=== FM radio ===
- 95.9 Sweet FM Xanthone Broadcasting
- 101.1 Radyo Natin DYRE-FM Manila Broadcasting Company & Madjaas Communication Service

=== Cable TV ===
- Kalibo Cable TV
