= Panay =

Island in the Philippines

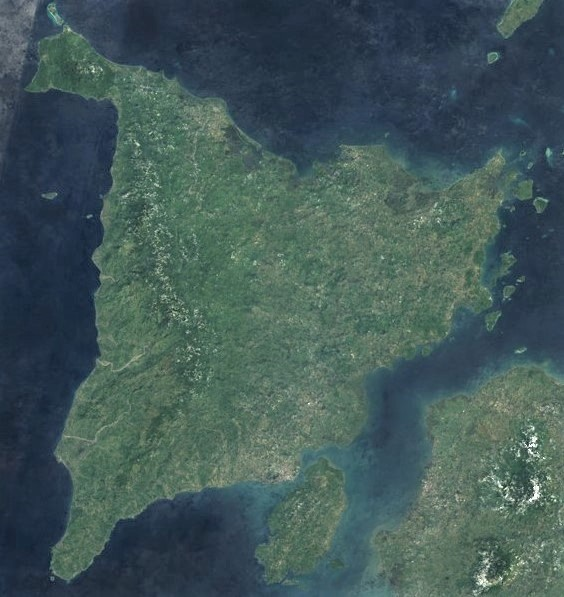
- Panay island satellite image captured by Sentinel-2 in 2016

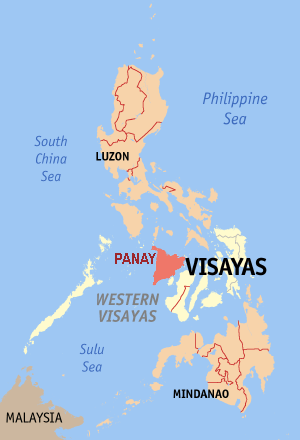
- Location within the Philippines
- Etymology: Ati ani nipay, 'harvest hairy grass'

Geography
- Location: Southeast Asia
- Coordinates: 11°09′N 122°29′E
- Archipelago: Visayas
- Adjacent to: Cuyo East Pass; Guimaras Strait; Iloilo Strait; Jintotolo Channel; Panay Gulf; Sibuyan Sea; Sulu Sea; Visayan Sea
- Area: 12,011 km^{2} (4,637 sq mi)
- Area rank: 67th
- Highest elevation: 2,117 m (6946 ft)
- Highest point: Mount Madja-as

Administration
- Philippines
- Region: Western Visayas
- Provinces: Aklan; Antique; Capiz; Iloilo
- Largest settlement: Iloilo City (pop. 473,728)

Demographics
- Demonym: Panayan/Panayanon
- Population: 4,669,037 (2024)
- Population rank: 24th
- Pop. density: 358/km^{2} (927/sq mi)
- Languages: Bisayan languages (Hiligaynon, Capiznon, Aklanon, Karay-a, Sulod, Ratagnon, Cuyonon, Caluyanon); Ati; Filipino; English (Filipino English, Bislish); Filipino Sign
- Ethnic groups: Visayans (Hiligaynon, Karay-a, Capiznon, Aklanon, Caluyanon); Ati; Suludnon

Additional information
- Time zone: Philippine Standard Time (UTC+8)

Panay is the sixth-largest and fourth-most populous island in the Philippines, with a total land area of 12,011 km^{2} (4,637 sq mi) and a total population of 4,669,037 as of 2024 census, similar to Sicily or Bali. Panay comprises 4.4 percent of the entire population of the country. The City of Iloilo is its largest settlement, with a total population of 473,728 inhabitants as of the 2024 census.

Panay is a triangular island, located in the western part of the Visayas. It is about 160 km (99 mi) across. It is divided into four provinces: Aklan, Antique, Capiz, and Iloilo, all in the Western Visayas Region. Just off the mid-southeastern coast lies the island-province of Guimaras. It is located southeast of the island of Mindoro and northwest of Negros across the Guimaras Strait. To the north and northeast is the Sibuyan Sea, Jintotolo Channel and the island-provinces of Romblon and Masbate; to the west and southwest is the Sulu Sea and the Palawan archipelago and to the south is Panay Gulf. Panay is the only main island in the Visayas whose provinces does not bear the name of their island.

Panay is bisected by the Central Panay Mountain Range, its longest mountain chain. The island has many rivers, the longest being the Panay River at a length of 168 kilometres (104 mi), followed by the Jalaur, Aklan, Sibalom, Iloilo and Bugang rivers. Standing at about 2,117 m (6,946 ft), the dormant Mount Madja-as (situated in Culasi, Antique) is the highest point of the island, with Mount Nangtud (located between Barbaza, Antique and Jamindan, Capiz) following next at 2,073 m (6,801 ft).

The island lent its name to several United States Navy vessels including USS Panay (PR-5), sunk in 1937 by the Japanese in the USS Panay incident.

== Etymology ==
In the past, Panay was called Simsiman. The community is located at the shores of the Ulian River and was linked by a creek. The creek provided salt to the Ati people as well as animals which lick the salt out of the salty water. Coming from the root word "simsim", "simsimin" means "to lick something to eat or to drink", thus the place was called Simsiman.

The native Ati called the island Aninipay from words "ani" to harvest and "nipay", a hairy grass abundant in the whole Panay.

== History ==
=== Precolonial era ===
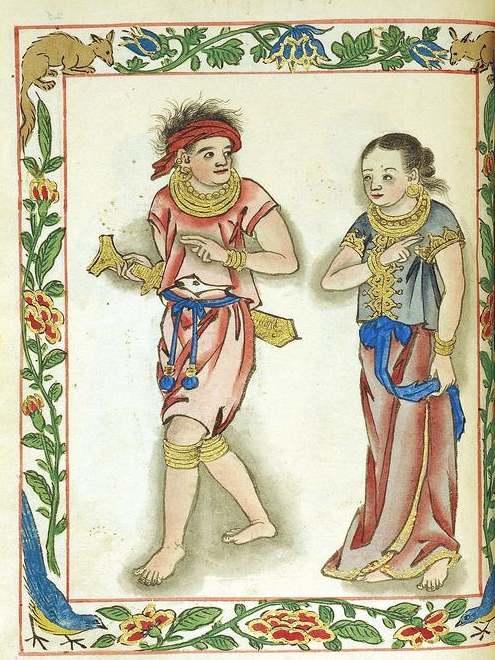
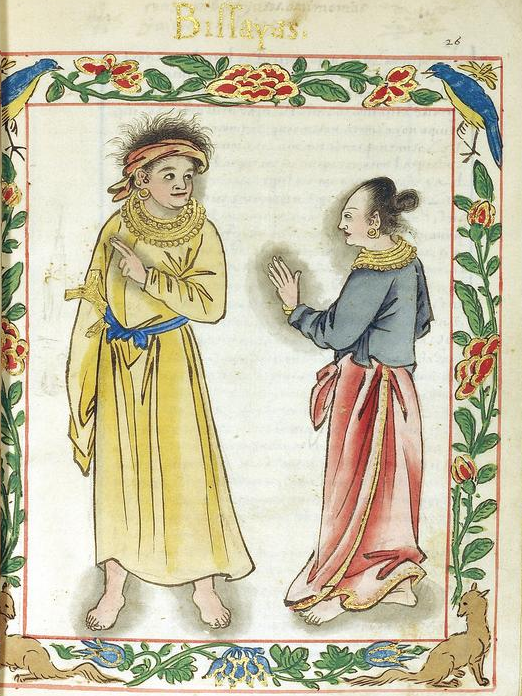
Left to right: Images from the Boxer Codex illustrating members of the ancient Visayan kadatuan or tumao class from Panay: [1] couple from the nobility, and [2] a royal couple.

No pre-Hispanic written accounts of Iloilo and Panay island exist today. Oral traditions, in the form of recited epics like the Hinilawod, have survived to a small degree. A few recordings of these epic poems exist. The most notable are the works of noted Filipino anthropologist Felipe Jocano.

While no current archaeological evidence exists describing pre-Hispanic Panay, an original work by Pedro Alcantara Monteclaro published in 1907 called Maragtas details the alleged accounts of the founding of the various pre-Hispanic polities on Panay Island. The book is based on oral and written accounts available to the author at the time. The author made no claim for the historical accuracy of the accounts. Noted anthropologist and historian William Henry Scott initially concluded in his dissertation that it was a myth, but in a revised version admitted its credibility is debatable and concluded it was most likely based on real folk legends.

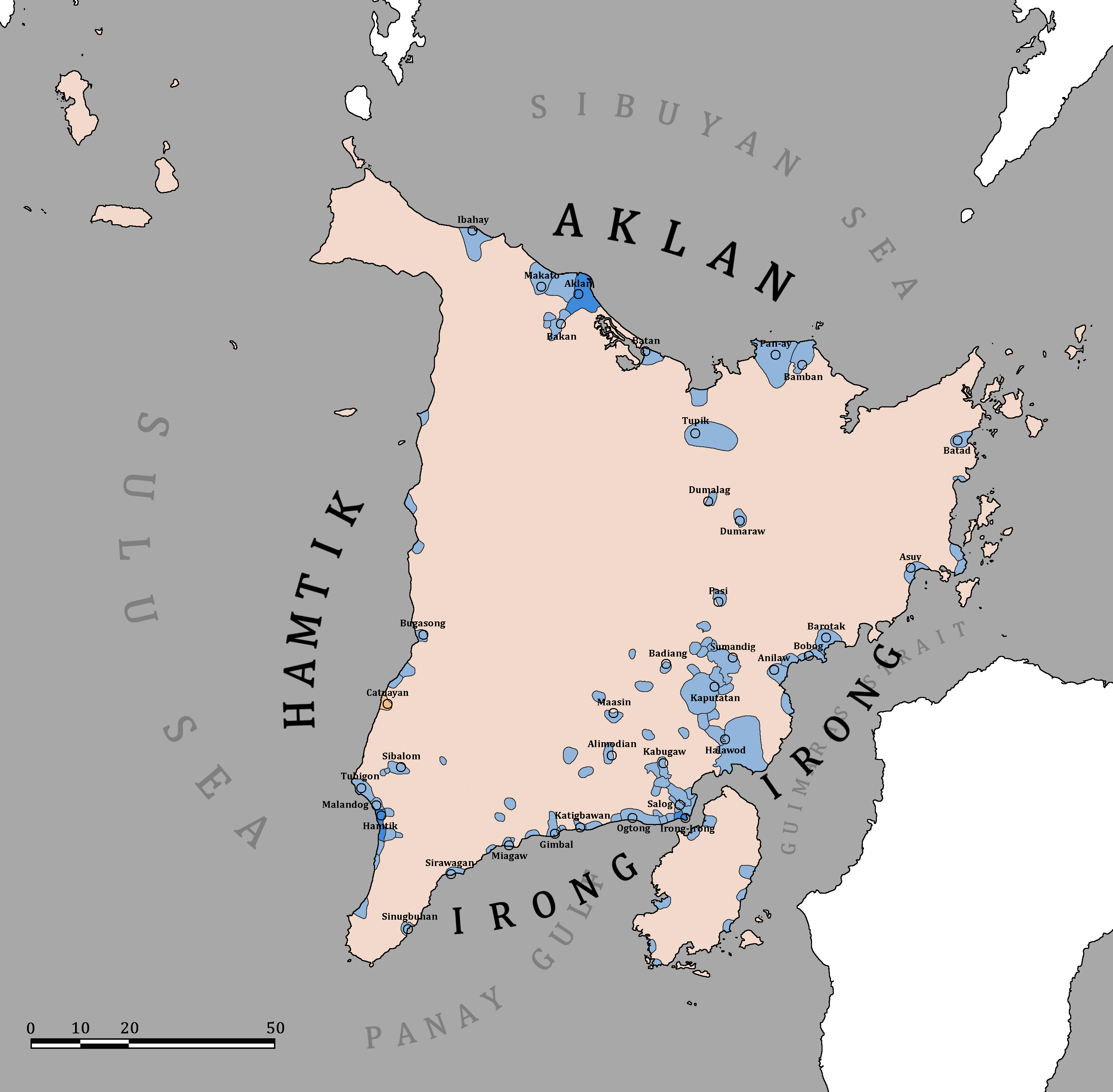
A map showing the Confederation of Madja-as.

According to Maragtas, Madja-as was founded after ten datus fled Borneo and landed on Panay Island. The book then goes on to detail their subsequent purchase of the coastal lands in which they settled from the native Ati people. There were other datus who settled in Southern Luzon and Negros Island, but Madja-as was the center and other barangays within the Kedatuan took turns in being the capital. Then, the Kedatuan of Madja-as, recruiting natives from the Philippines; and the immigrants from Borneo, went back and waged a successful war against Rajah or Sultan Makatunao, whose oppression forced the ten Datus to flee. Afterwards, the treasures and loot from the conquest and sacking of Borneo, were carried back to the newly founded towns of the Datus in the various islands scattered in the archipelago.

An old manuscript Margitas of uncertain date (discovered by the anthropologist H. Otley Beyer) gives interesting details about the laws, government, social customs, and religious beliefs of the early Visayans, who settled Panay within the first half of the thirteenth century. The term Visayan was first applied only to them and to their settlements eastward in the island of Negros, and northward in the smaller islands, which now compose the province of Romblon. In fact, even at the early part of Spanish colonialization of the Philippines, the Spaniards used the term Visayan only for these areas. While the people of Cebu, Bohol, and Leyte were for a long time known only as Pintados. The name Visayan was later extended to them because, as several of the early writers state, their languages are closely allied to the Visayan dialect of Panay.

Gabriel Ribera, captain of the Spanish royal infantry in the Philippine Islands, also distinguished Panay from the rest of the Pintados Islands. In his report (dated 20 March 1579) regarding a campaign to pacify the natives living along the rivers of Mindanao (a mission he received from Dr. Francisco de Sande, Governor and Captain-General of the Archipelago), Ribera mentioned that his aim was to make the inhabitants of that island "vassals of King Don Felipe… as are all the natives of the island of Panay, the Pintados Islands, and those of the island of Luzon…"

During the early part of the colonial period in the Archipelago, the Spaniards led by Miguel López de Legazpi transferred their camp from Cebu to Panay in 1569. On 5 June 1569, Guido de Lavezaris, the royal treasurer in the Archipelago, wrote to Philip II reporting about the Portuguese attack to Cebu in the preceding autumn. A letter from another official, Andres de Mirandaola (dated three days later, 8 June), also described briefly this encounter with the Portuguese. The danger of another attack led the Spaniards to remove their camp from Cebu to Panay, which they considered a safer place. Legazpi himself, in his report to the Viceroy in New Spain (dated 1 July 1569), mentioned the same reason for the relocation of Spaniards to Panay. It was in Panay that the conquest of Luzon was planned, and later launched on 8 May 1570.

=== The account of early Spanish explorers ===
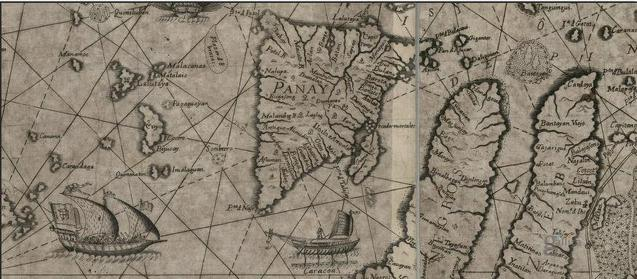
A 1734 map of Panay

During the early part of the Spanish colonization of the Philippines, the Spanish Augustinian Friar Gaspar de San Agustín, O.S.A. described Panay as: "…very similar to that of Sicily in its triangular form, as well as in it fertility and abundance of provision. It is the most populated island after Manila and Mindanao, and one of the largest (with over a hundred leagues of coastline). In terms of fertility and abundance, it is the first. […] It is very beautiful, very pleasant, and full of coconut palms… Near the river Alaguer (Halaur), which empties into the sea two leagues from the town of Dumangas…, in the ancient times, there was a trading center and a court of the most illustrious nobility in the whole island." Padre Francisco Colin (1592–1660), an early Jesuit missionary and Provincial of his Order in the Philippines also records in the chronicles of the Society of Jesus (published later in 1663 as Labor euangelica) that Panay is the island which is most abundant and fertile.

The first Spanish settlement in Panay island and the second oldest Spanish settlement in the Philippines was established by the Miguel López de Legazpi expedition in Panay, Capiz at the banks of the Panay River in northern Panay, the name of which was extended to the whole Panay island. López de Legazpi transferred the capital there from Cebu since it had abundant provisions and was better protected from Portuguese attacks before the capital was once again transferred to Manila. Of the conquistadors from Spanish-Mexico, the following were granted encomiendas in Panay: Gabriel de Ribera, Luis de la Haya, Pedro Sarmiento, and Francisco de Rivera.

Miguel de Luarca, who was among the first Spanish settlers in the Island, made one of the earliest account about Panay and its people according to a Westerner's point of view. In June 1582, while he was in Arévalo (Iloilo), he wrote in his Relación de las Yslas Filipinas the following observations:

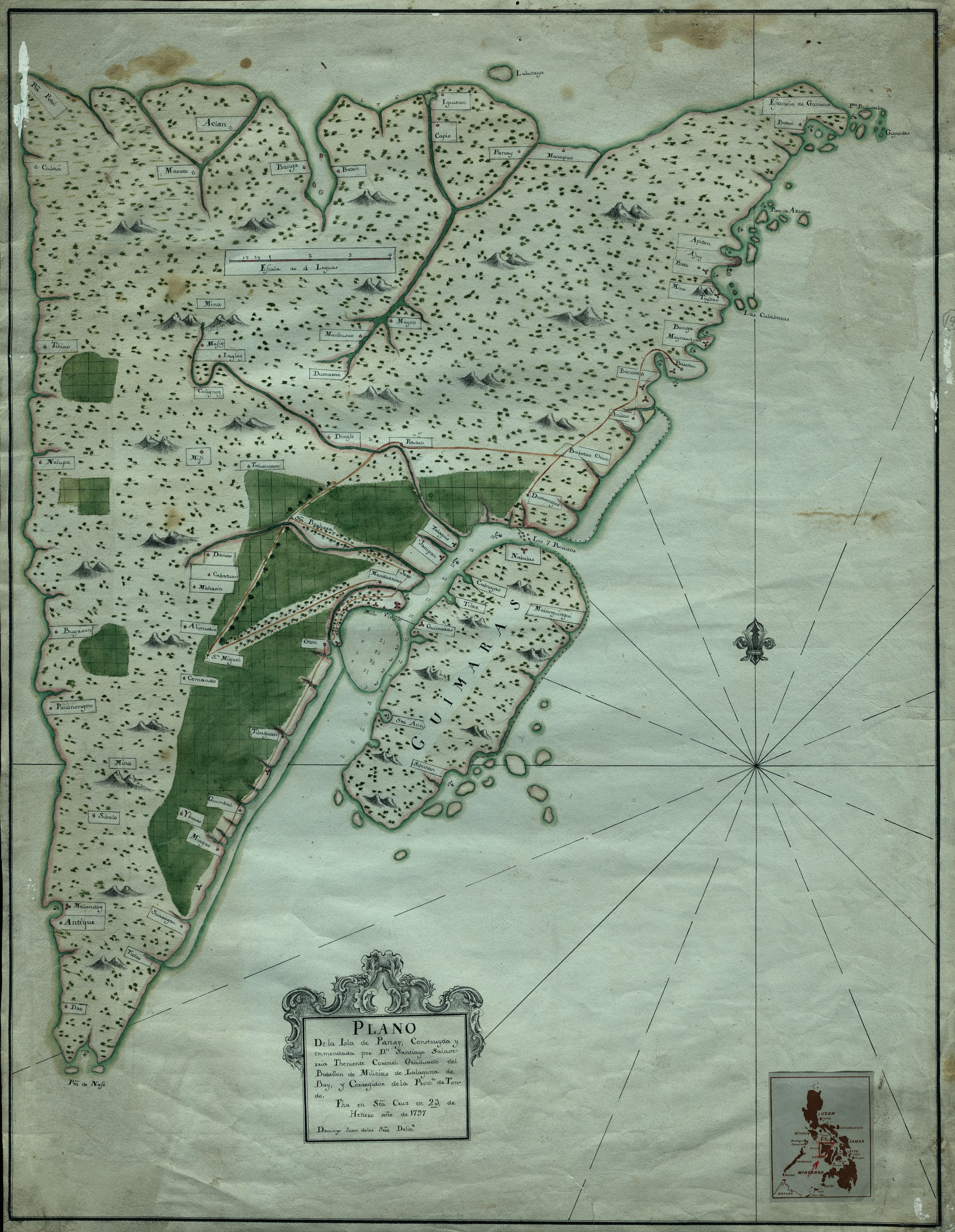
Map of Panay, with data about the bastions of its coastlines, 1797, drawn under the direction of Don Santiago Salaverria, Teniente Coronel graduado de Batallon de Milicias de la Laguna de Bay, y Corregidor de la Provincia de Tondo.

The island is the most fertile and well-provisioned, except the island of Luzon: for it is exceedingly fertile, and abounds in rice, swine, fowls, wax, honey, cotton and abacá fiber.

"The villages are very close together, and the people are peaceful and open to conversion. The land is healthful and well-provisioned, so that the Spaniards who are stricken in other islands go thither to recover their health."

"The natives are healthy and clean, and although the island of Cebu is also healthful and had a good climate, most of its inhabitants are always afflicted with the itch and buboes. In the island of Panay, the natives declare that no one of them had ever been afflicted with buboes until the people from Bohol – who, as we said above, abandoned Bohol on account of the people of Maluco – came to settle in Panay, and gave the disease to some of the natives. For these reasons the governor, Don Gonzalo Ronquillo, founded the town of Arévalo, on the south side of this island; for the island runs north and south, and on that side live the majority of the people, and the villages are near this town, and the land here is more fertile." This probably explains why there are reference of presence of Pintados in the Island.

"The island of Panay provides the city of Manila and other places with a large quantity of rice and meat…"... "As the island contains great abundance of timber and provisions, it has almost continuously had a shipyard on it, as is the case of the town of Arévalo, for galleys and fragatas. Here the ship 'Visaya' was launched."

Another Spanish chronicler in the early Spanish period, Dr. Antonio de Morga (1609) is also responsible for recording other Visayan customs. Customs such as Visayans' affinity for singing among their warrior-castes as well as the playing of gongs and bells in naval battles.

Their customary method of trading was by bartering one thing for another, such as food, cloth, cattle, fowls, lands, houses, fields, slaves, fishing-grounds, and palm-trees (both nipa and wild). Sometimes a price intervened, which was paid in gold, as agreed upon, or in metal bells brought from China. These bells they regard as precious jewels; they resemble large pans and are very sonorous. They play upon these at their feasts, and carry them to the war in their boats instead of drums and other instruments.

The early Dutch fleet commander Cornelis Matelieff de Jonge called at Panay in 1607. He mentions a town named "Oton" on the island where there were "18 Spanish soldiers with a number of other Spanish inhabitants so that there may be 40 whites in all". He explained that "a lot of rice and meat is produced there, with which they [i.e. the Spanish] supply Manila."

According to Stephanie J. Mawson, using recruitment records found in Mexico, in addition to the 40 Caucasian Spaniards who then lived in Oton, there were an additional set of 66 Mexican soldiers of Mulatto, Mestizo or Native American descent sentried there during the year 1603. However, the Dutch visitor, Cornelis Matelieff de Jongedid, did not count them in since they were not pure whites like him.

Iloilo City in Panay was awarded by the Queen of Spain the title: "La Muy Leal y Noble Ciudad de Iloilo" (The Most Loyal and Noble City) for being the most loyal and noble city in the Spanish Empire since it clung on to Spain amidst the Philippine revolution the last nation to revolt against Spain in the Spanish Empire.

=== Colonial rule (1565–1898) ===
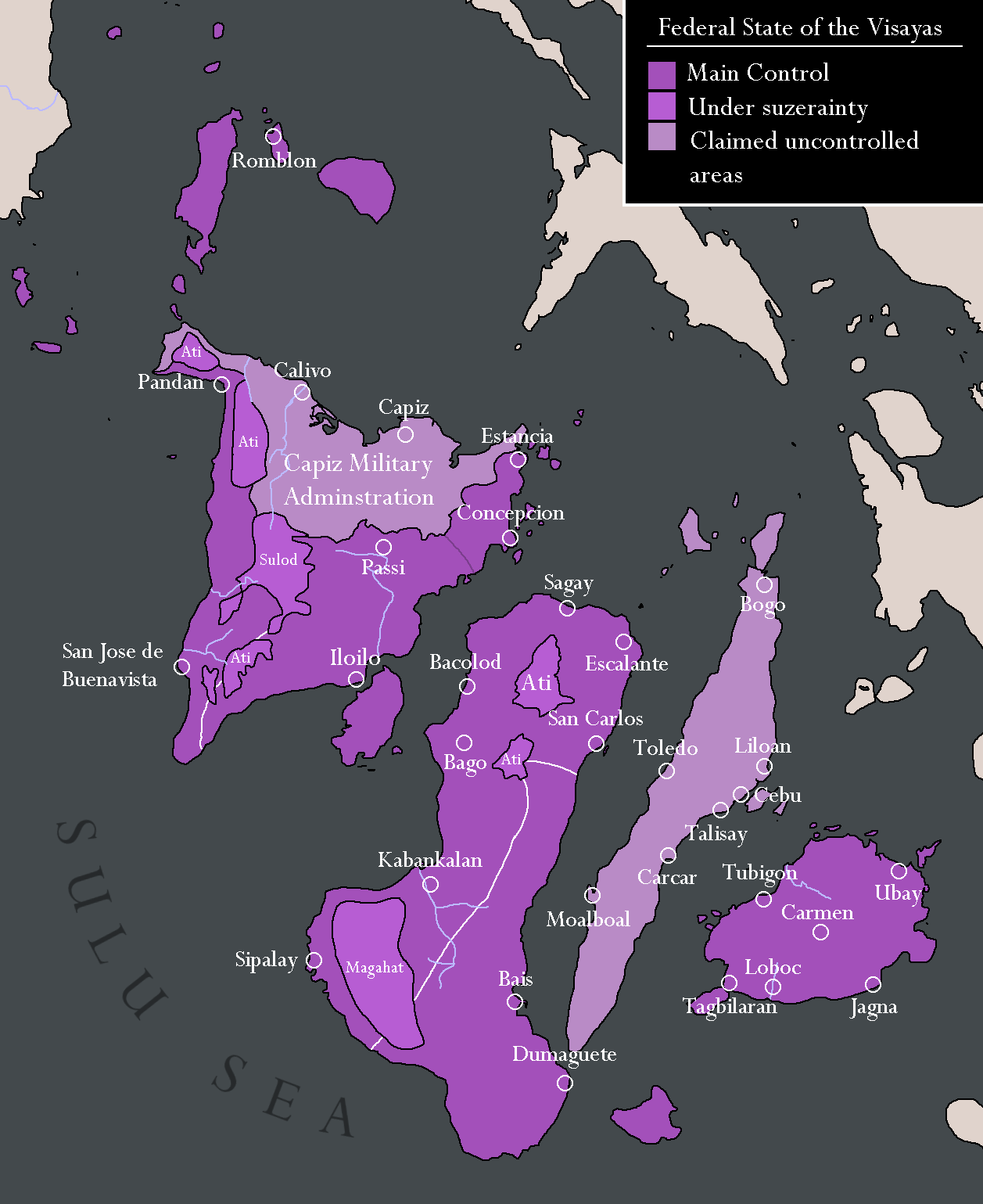
Map of the short-lived Federal State of the Visayas, centered on Panay Island. The island served as the focus of the revolutionary state in the central Philippine archipelago, with Iloilo City designated as the capital of the Visayas.

The Spaniards landed in Batan (in Panay's northeastern territory, which is currently called Province of Aklan), in 1565. Following the Spanish conquest, the locals became Christians. Father Andres Urdaneta baptized thousands of Aklanons in 1565, and consequently these settlements were named Calivo.

Legazpi then parceled Aklan to his men. Antonio Flores became encomiendero for all settlements along the Aklan River and he was also appointed in charge of pacification and religious instruction. Pedro Sarmiento; was appointed for Batan, Francisco de Rivera; for Mambusao, Gaspar Ruiz de Morales; and for Panay town, Pedro Guillen de Lievana.

Later (in 1569), Miguel López de Legazpi transferred the Spanish headquarters from Cebu to Panay. On 5 June 1569, Guido de Lavezaris, the royal treasurer in the Archipelago, wrote to Philip II reporting about the Portuguese attack to Cebu in the preceding autumn. A letter from another official, Andres de Mirandaola (dated three days later - 8 June), also described briefly this encounter with the Portuguese. The danger of another attack led the Spaniards to remove their camp from Cebu to Panay, which they considered a safer place. Legazpi himself, in his report to the Viceroy in New Spain (dated 1 July 1569), mentioned the same reason for the relocation of Spaniards to Panay. It was in Panay that the conquest of Luzon was planned, and launched on 8 May 1570.

In 1572, the island was organized into two provinces: jurisdictions of Panay (Capiz and Aklan) and Oton (Iloilo and Antique).

In 1693, the town of Capiz, known as El Puerto de Capiz was finally created.

In 1716, Capiz was organized into a separate politico-military province with the transfer of the capital from the town of Panay, Under its jurisdiction were the neighboring islands of Campo, Romblon, Tablas, and Sibuyan.

In 1796, Panay island was divided into three provinces: Iloilo, Antique, and Capiz (which included Aklan and Romblon).

In 1853, The island now comprising Romblon province and Maestre de Campo was organized into separate politico-military “comandancia” administered from Capiz.

In 1898, The Spanish educated Panay Island and were replaced by the revolutionary forces, who were in turn overthrown by the American the following year.

=== World War II ===
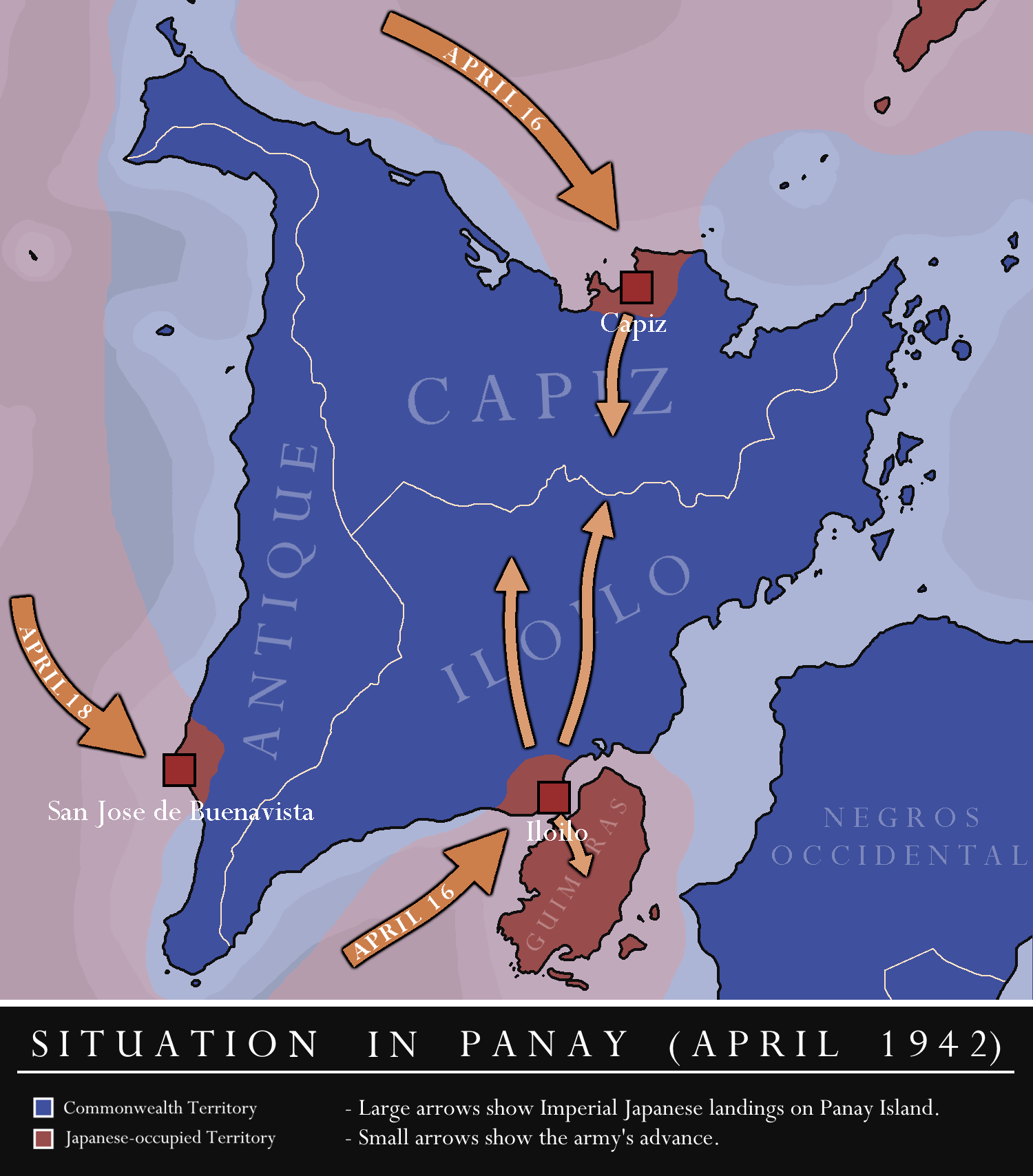
Map showing the Japanese invasion of Panay during World War II.

On April 16, 1942, Imperial Japanese Army forces landed at San Jose de Buenavista, Capiz City (now the city of Roxas), and Iloilo City during World War II in order to secure Panay and the rest of Visayas. Guerrilla forces under Colonel Macario Peralta Jr. later liberated most of the island and eventually captured the city of Capiz on December 20, 1944. Peralta's forces therefore achieved the liberation from Japanese occupation of all of Capiz Province before Allied forces landed at Iloilo City on March 18, 1945, and mopped up the remaining Japanese forces in the island.

=== Modern period ===
Aklan (Akean) became an independent province through Republic Act No. 1414 signed by Philippine President Ramon Magsaysay on April 25, 1956, separating Aklan from Capiz. The original towns were Altavas, Balete, Batan, Banga, Buruanga, Ibajay, Kalibo, Lezo, Libacao, Madalag, Malay, Makato, Malinao, Nabas, New Washington, Numancia, and Tangalan, then all part of the province of Capiz. The province was inaugurated on November 8, 1956. Jose Raz Menez was appointed the first governor of Aklan by President Magsaysay and he served until December 30, 1959. In 1960, Godofredo P. Ramos became the first elected governor but upon resigning to run for Congress he was succeeded by the vice governor, Virgilio S. Patricio. In 1964, José B. Legaspi succeeded Patricio and he held office for two consecutive terms from 1964 to 1971.

== Geography ==
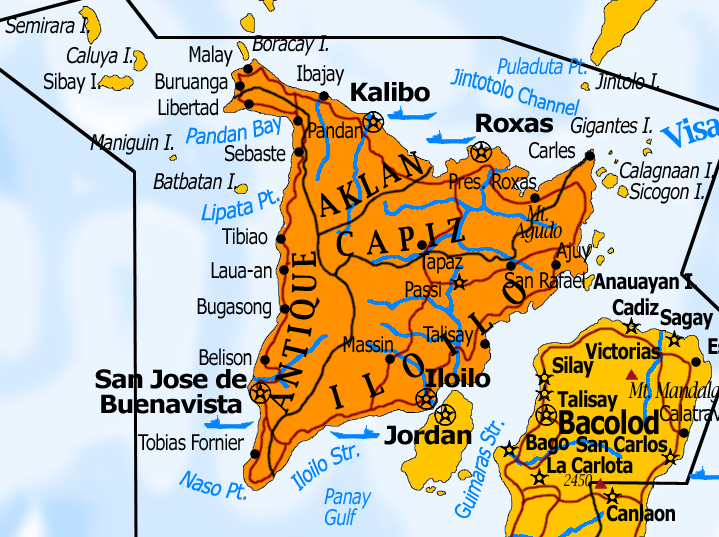
Map of Panay Island.

Panay island is the sixth largest island in the Philippines by area, with a total land area of 12,011 km^{2} (4,637 sq mi), similar to Jamaica or Samar. Mount Madja-as is the highest point in Panay with an elevation of 2,117 metres (6,946 ft) above sea level, located in town of Culasi in the northern province of Antique. Central Panay Mountain Range is the longest and largest mountain range in the island with a total length of 170 km (110 mi) north-south. Panay River is the longest river in the island with a total length of 169 km (105 mi) located in the province of Capiz.

Boracay Island, a popular tourist destination known for its long white sand shore, is located 0.86 km (0.53 mi; 0.46 nmi) off the northwest tip of Panay Island. It is part of Aklan province under the jurisdiction of the municipality of Malay.

=== Topography ===
The highest mountain is Mount Madja-as, at 6,946 ft (2,117 m).

=== Rivers ===
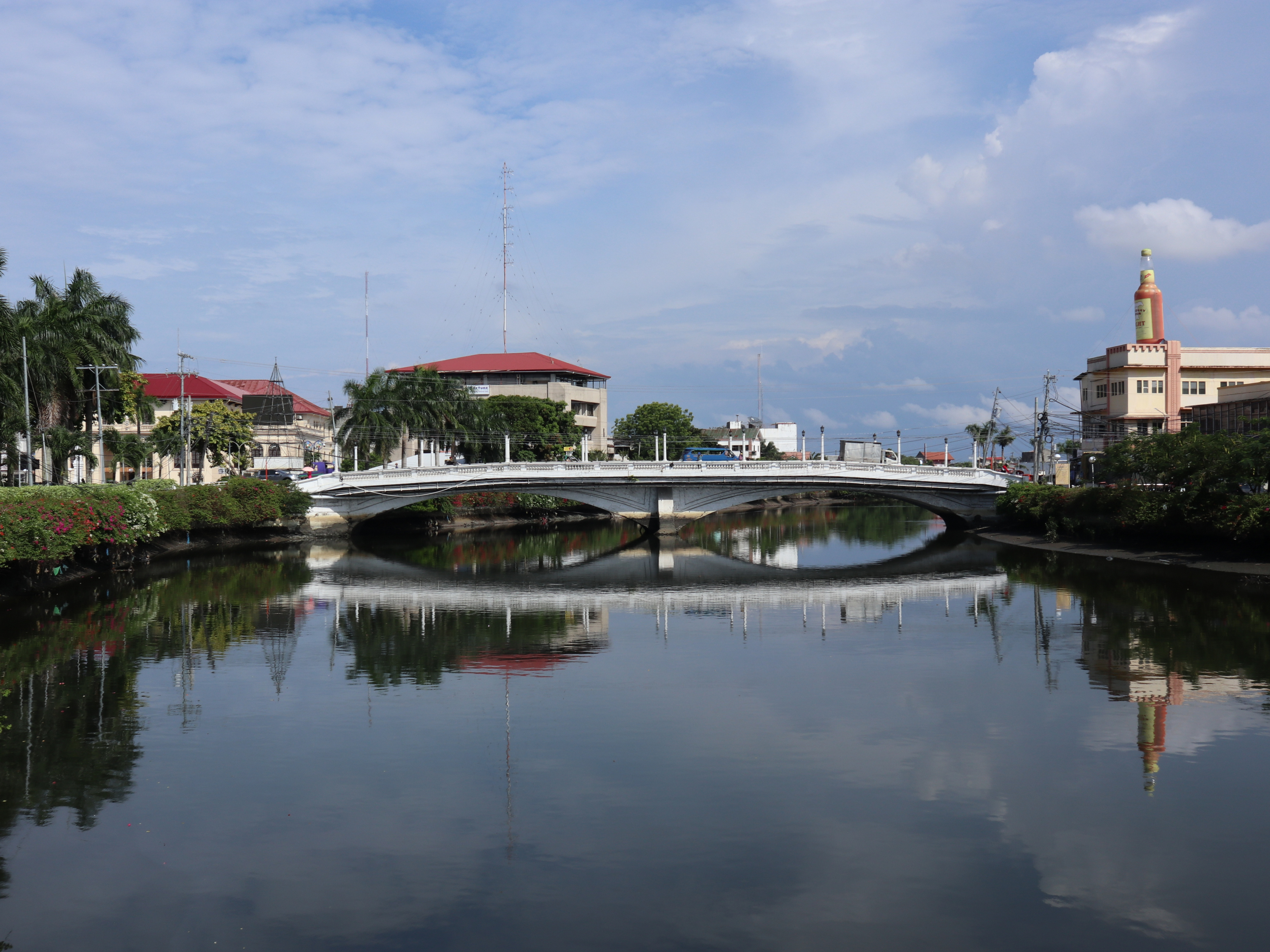
Panay River in Roxas City

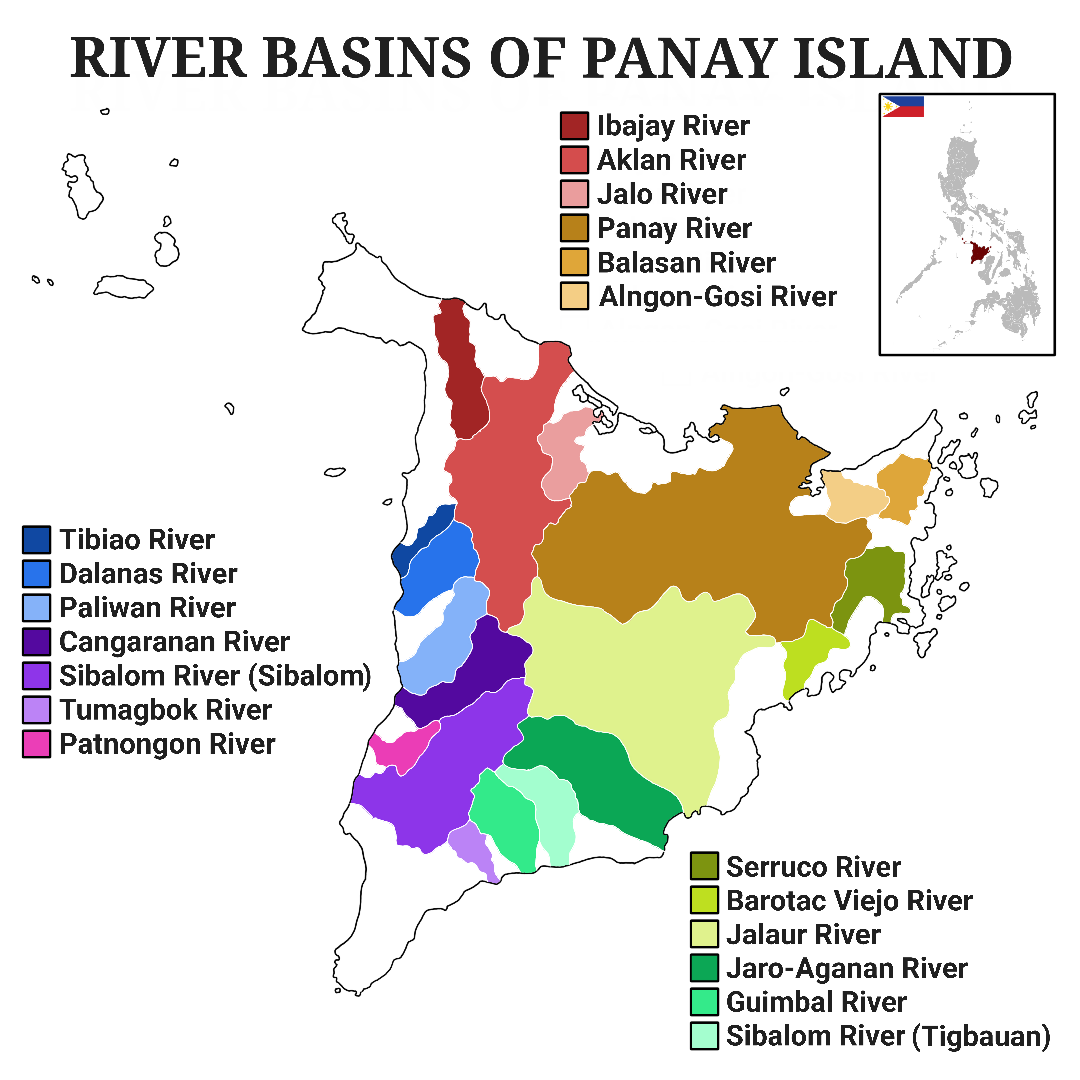
Map of major river basins in Panay

Major rivers in Panay include:

- Jalaur River
- Iloilo River
- Batiano River
- Panay River
- Aklan River
- Sibalom River
- Tipulu-an River
- Mao-it River
- Bugang River

== Demographics ==
Population of Panay

| Year | Pop. | ±% |
|---|---|---|
| 1903 | 747,452 | — |
| 1918 | 923,443 | +23.5% |
| 1939 | 1,310,174 | +41.9% |
| 1948 | 1,451,062 | +10.8% |
| 1960 | 1,688,422 | +16.4% |
| 1970 | 2,041,530 | +20.9% |
| 1975 | 2,276,083 | +11.5% |
| 1980 | 2,502,932 | +10.0% |

| Year | Pop. | ±% |
|---|---|---|
| 1990 | 3,018,435 | +20.6% |
| 1995 | 3,216,282 | +6.6% |
| 2000 | 3,503,865 | +8.9% |
| 2007 | 3,822,639 | +9.1% |
| 2010 | 4,031,636 | +5.5% |
| 2015 | 4,302,634 | +6.7% |
| 2020 | 4,542,926 | +5.6% |

Source: Philippine Statistics Authority

Languages Spoken as a Primary (2000)
| Language | Speakers |
| Hiligaynon | 1,225,595 (34.98%) |
| Kinaray-a | 868,177 (24.78%) |
| Capiznon | 660,540 (18.85%) |
| Aklanon | 579,096 (16.53%) |
| Other Visayan languages | 78,836 (2.25%) |
| Others | 91,621 (2.61%) |

Panay is the most ethnically and linguistically diverse major island in the Visayas, being native to four vibrant non-indigenous ethnolinguistic groups (Hiligaynon/Ilonggo, Karay-a, Capiznon, Aklanon), and two indigenous groups (Suludnon, Ati) or minorities. However, the ethnic and linguistic boundaries within the island do not correspond to its administrative divisions. Only the province of Antique is monolingual, which only speaks Kinaray-a as its primary language. The lingua franca of the island is Hiligaynon, native to Iloilo City and the northeastern coastal strip lining the province of Iloilo. For local administrative, educational, and commercial purposes, English and Tagalog are also widely used.

== Administrative divisions ==
The island is covered by 4 provinces, 1 highly urbanized city, 2 component cities, 92 municipalities (93 municipalities if the associated islands of Caluya are included), and 3,291 barangays, all under the jurisdiction of the Western Visayas region.

| Province or HUC | Population (2020) | Land area | Population Density | Capital | Barangays | Municipalities or Districts | Cities | Location |
|---|---|---|---|---|---|---|---|---|
| Aklan | 615,475 | 1,821.42 km^{2} (703.25 sq mi) | 340/km^{2} (880/sq mi) | Kalibo | 327 | 17 towns: Altavas; Balete; Banga; Batan; Buruanga; Ibajay; Kalibo; Lezo; Libacao; Madalag; Makato; Malay; Malinao; Nabas; New Washington; Numancia; Tangalan | — | |
| Antique | 612,974 | 2,729.17 km^{2} (1,053.74 sq mi) | 220/km^{2} (570/sq mi) | San Jose de Buenavista | 590 | 18 towns: Anini-y; Barbaza; Belison; Bugasong; Caluya*; Culasi; Hamtic; Laua-an; Libertad; Pandan; Patnongon; San Jose de Buenavista; San Remigio; Sebaste; Sibalom; Tibiao; Tobias Fornier; Valderrama | — | |
| Capiz | 804,952 | 2,594.64 km^{2} (1,001.80 sq mi) | 310/km^{2} (800/sq mi) | Roxas City | 473 | 16 towns: Cuartero; Dao; Dumalag; Dumarao; Ivisan; Jamindan; Maayon; Mambusao; Panay; Panitan; Pilar; Pontevedra; President Roxas; Sapian; Sigma; Tapaz | Roxas City | |
| Iloilo | 2,051,899 | 5,000.83 km^{2} (1,930.83 sq mi) | 410/km^{2} (1,100/sq mi) | Iloilo City | 1,721 | 42 towns: Ajuy; Alimodian; Anilao; Badiangan; Balasan; Banate; Barotac Nuevo; Barotac Viejo; Batad; Bingawan; Cabatuan; Calinog; Carles; Concepcion; Dingle; Dueñas; Dumangas; Estancia; Guimbal; Igbaras; Janiuay; Lambunao; Leganes; Lemery; Leon; Maasin; Miagao; Mina; New Lucena; Oton; Pavia; Pototan; San Dionisio; San Enrique; San Joaquin; San Miguel; San Rafael; Santa Barbara; Sara; Tigbauan; Tubungan; Zarraga | Iloilo; Passi | |
| Iloilo City | 457,626 | 78.34 km^{2} (30.25 sq mi) | 5,800/km^{2} (15,000/sq mi) | — | 180 | 7 districts: Arevalo; City Proper; Jaro; La Paz; Lapuz; Mandurriao; Molo | — | |
| Total | 4,542,926 | 12,011 km^{2} (4,637 sq mi) | 380/km^{2} (980/sq mi) | — | 3,291 | 93 towns | 3 cities (1 highly urbanized city) | |
Notes: The municipality of Caluya in Antique province is covered by separate islands which are included under the island group of Panay. Iloilo figures excluded the highly urbanized city of Iloilo.

== Transportation ==
=== Road ===
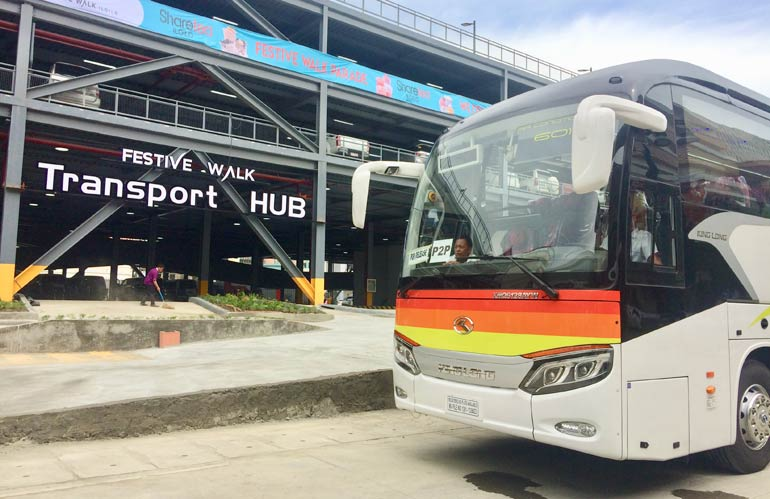
Premium Point-to-Point (P2P) Bus servicing Iloilo City to Iloilo International, Kalibo International, and Caticlan Airports and vice versa.

All the provinces in Panay are interconnected by major inter-provincial roads. Iloilo City is served mostly by passenger jeepneys, white metered taxis and tricycles within the city limits. The primary transportation vehicle used within Roxas City, Kalibo, San Jose de Buenavista and other cities and municipalities in Panay is the tricycle. Travel between cities and municipalities is typically by jeepney, vans and Ceres operated buses. In March 2019, the Land Transportation Franchising and Regulatory Board announced the opening of a new Premium Point-to-Point Bus Service in Iloilo City with express bus services to the airports in Cabatuan, Kalibo and Boracay (Caticlan).

Iloilo is one of the few cities in the Philippines that recently initiated to adopt the mini-bus-like type modern PUJ or modern Jeepneys in contrast to the President Rodrigo Duterte's administration to phase out the old dilapidated jeepneys as the mode of mass public transportation in the Philippines.

The Iloilo-Capiz-Aklan Expressway (ICAEx) is also being proposed, which might reduce travel time between provinces in Panay. It will connect Iloilo City and Malay, Aklan through Passi City, Roxas City and Kalibo, Aklan.

=== Airports ===
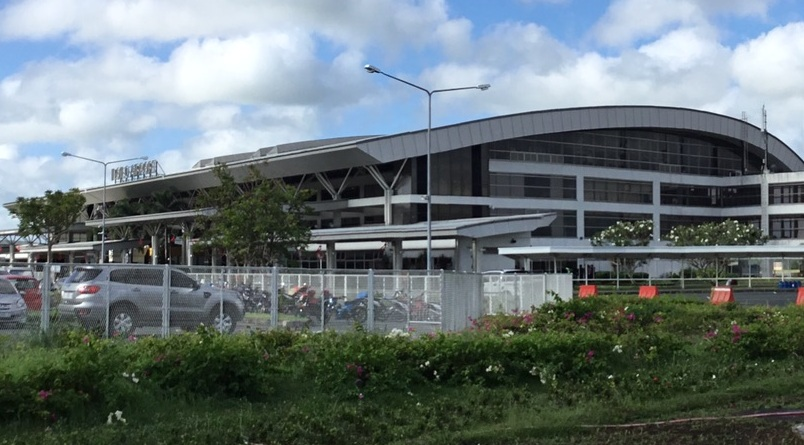
Iloilo International Airport, primary gateway into the region.

Panay Island is now served by five airports. The Iloilo International Airport, located in Cabatuan, Iloilo, serves the general area of Iloilo-Guimaras Metropolitan as well the whole province of Iloilo, and is also considered to be the primary gateway into the region. The Kalibo International Airport is one of the two airports serving Boracay, the other being Godofredo P. Ramos Airport (also known as Caticlan Airport) in the municipality of Malay. The Roxas Airport is a domestic airport serving the general area of Roxas City and the province of Capiz. The Evelio Javier Airport (Antique Airport) is the only airport serving the province of Antique located in San Jose. The other, Semirara Airport in Caluya is a municipal airport.

==== International ====
- Iloilo International Airport
- Kalibo International Airport

==== Domestic ====
- Godofredo P. Ramos Airport (Caticlan Airport)
- Roxas Airport
- Evelio Javier Airport (Antique Airport)

=== Rail ===
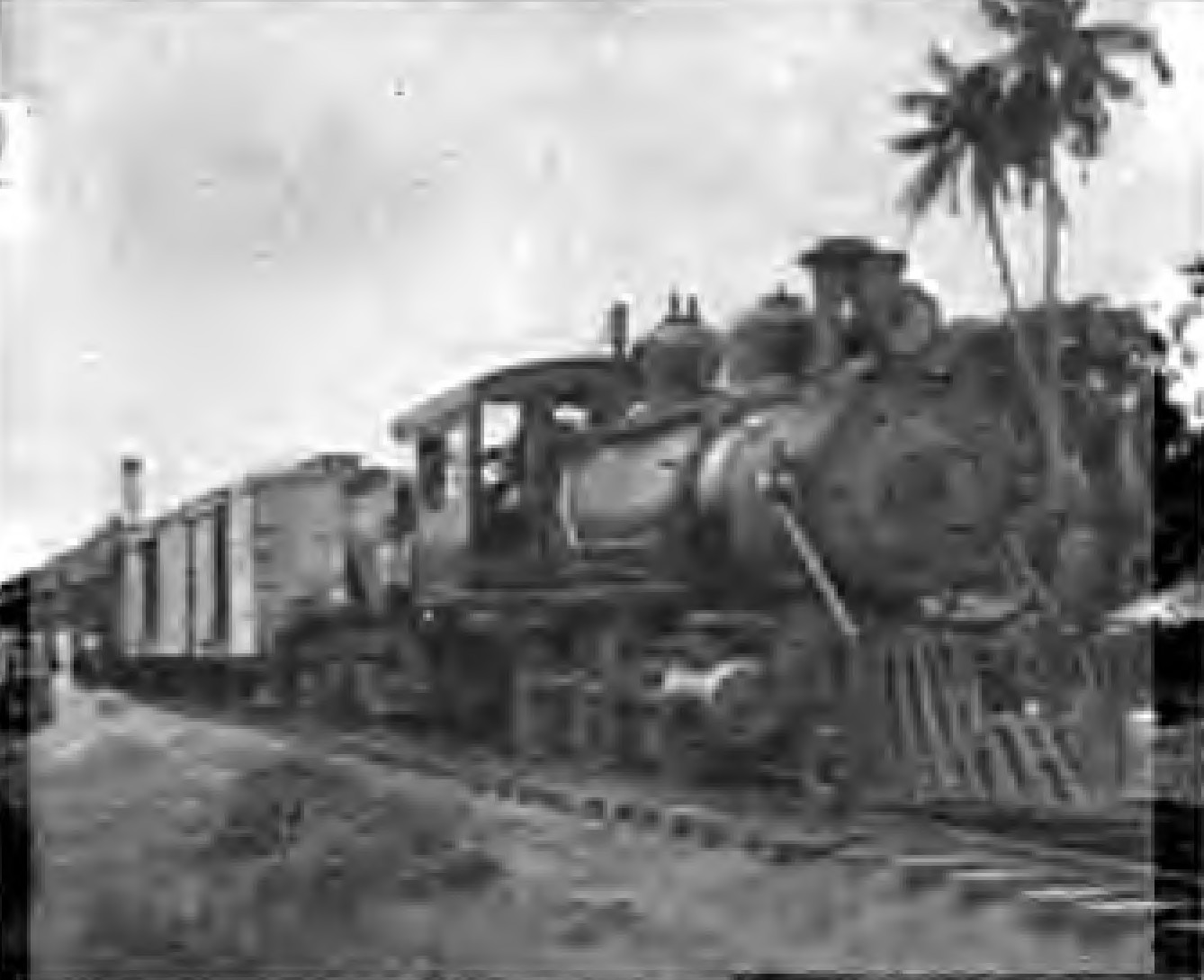
Panay Railway in 1917, provided an important means of transportation for passengers and goods between Iloilo City and Roxas City, two major urban centers on Panay.

Proposals to re-connect again Iloilo-Roxas, Iloilo-Kalibo, Iloilo-Malay (Aklan) and Iloilo-San Jose (Antique) from the Iloilo City via rail was included in the revival of the currently defunct Panay Railways network which has a station in Santa Barbara town proper.

== See also ==
- Sultanate of Panay
- Macario Peralta, Jr.
- Panay Railways
- Church of Panay
