= Mount Nangtud =

Mountain in the Philippines

- Location within Visayas Location within Philippines

Highest point
- Elevation: 2,074 m (6,804 ft)
- Prominence: 921 m (3,022 ft)
- Listing: Second-highest peak in Panay; Third-highest mountain in the Visayas
- Coordinates: 11°16′03″N 122°12′26″E

Geography
- Country: Philippines
- Region: Western Visayas
- Province: Capiz, Antique (disputed border)
- Parent range: Central Panay Mountain Range

Geology
- Mountain type: Fold mountain

Climbing
- First ascent: 1977-Expedition organized by: Gov. Evelio B. Javier
- Easiest route: Lombuyan Trail, Barbaza, Antique; The only established route and used by hikers.

Mount Nangtud is the second highest peak on the island of Panay, in the Philippines and third highest mountain in the Visayas, after Mount Kanlaon and Mount Madja-as. With an elevation of 2,074 m (6,804 ft) above sea level, it is located geographically within Jamindan, Capiz bordering with Barbaza, Antique. Mount Nangtud is famous for its "sea of clouds" and rich for its diverse flora and fauna and mossy forest. It is part of the Central Panay Mountain Range, the longest and largest mountain range in Panay and Western Visayas.

" Knife Edge Trail " is the most famous and scenic trail in Mount Nangtud. Because of its geographic location on Panay island, it is technically one of the most challenging mountain to climb in the Visayas, with 8/9 difficulty, alongside Mount Baloy, Mount Madja-as and Mount Kanlaon.

The nearest peaks are Mount Kigas, Mount Dumara, Mount Bucayan, Mount Sipanag, Mount Dalangnan, Mount Nausang, Mount Balabag and overlooking Mount Madja-as to the northwest and Mount Baloy to the southeast.

== Geography ==
Mount Nangtud is Panay island's second highest peak after Mount Madja-as. It is located in Central Panay Mountain Range of Jamindan, Capiz in the border of Barbaza, Antique.

Mount Nangtud is the source of Paliwan River, Kigas River, Bucayan River and the tributaries of Aklan River.
