= Barbaza =

Municipality in Antique, Philippines

- Municipality
- Municipality of Barbaza
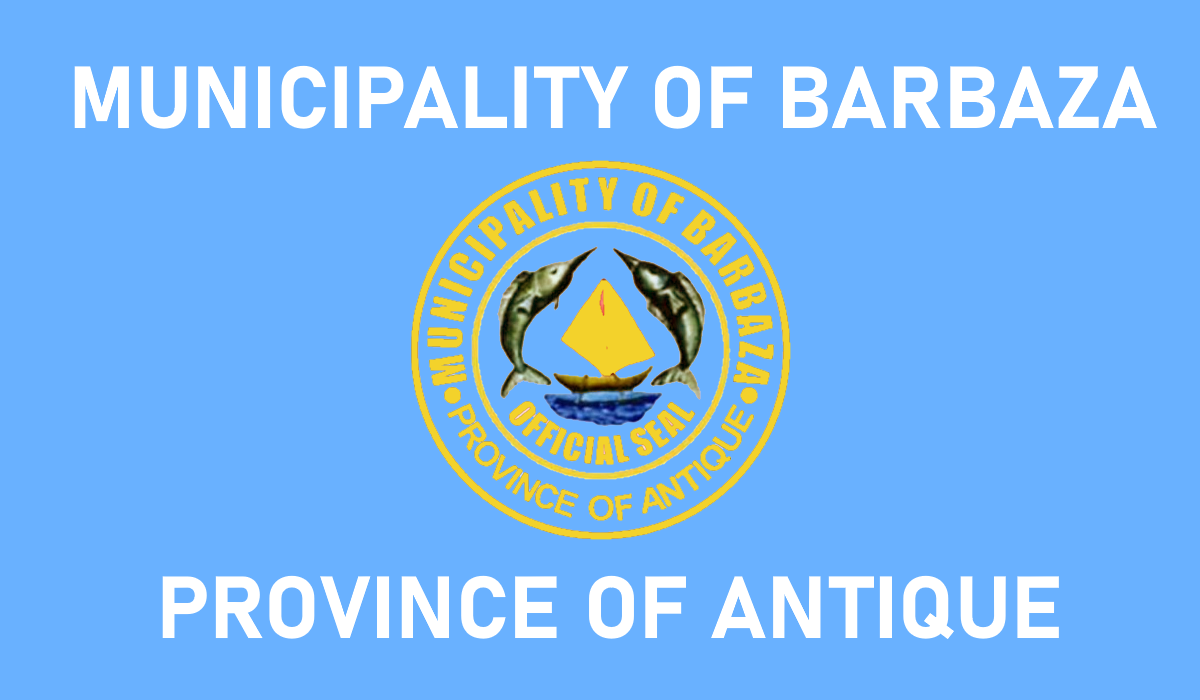
- Flag

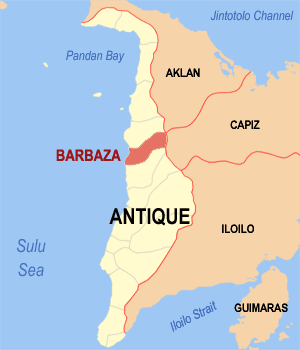
- Map of Antique with Barbaza highlighted
- Interactive map of Barbaza
- Location in the Philippines
- Coordinates: 11°11′46″N 122°02′20″E
- Country: Philippines
- Region: Western Visayas
- Province: Antique
- District: Lone district
- Barangays: 39 (see Barangays)

Government
  - Type: Sangguniang Bayan
  - Mayor: Roberto C. Necor
  - Vice Mayor: Emmanuel R. Andres
  - Representative: AA Legarda
  - Municipal Council: Members: Gerry C. Necor; Detlef Immanuel P. Juanitas; Romeo J. Genovata Jr.; Magnirico Esparar; Pablito A. Manalo; Limuel Esparagoza; Roberto P. Grajo; Antonio Bajala; Danny Remo LNB President; Steve Ivan Palacios SK Fed President
  - Electorate: 16,101 voters (2025)

Area
  - Total: 154.36 km^{2} (59.60 sq mi)
- Elevation: 10 m (33 ft)
- Highest elevation (Mount Nangtud): 2,074 m (6,804 ft)
- Lowest elevation: 0 m (0 ft)

Population (2024 census)
  - Total: 24,925
  - Density: 161.47/km^{2} (418.21/sq mi)
  - Households: 6,034

Economy
  - Income class: 3rd municipal income class
  - Poverty incidence: 17.97% (2023)
  - Revenue: ₱ 152.8 million (2024)
  - Assets: ₱ 274.4 million (2024)
  - Expenditure: ₱ 77.72 million (2024)
  - Liabilities: ₱ 107.8 million (2024)

Service provider
  - Electricity: Antique Electric Cooperative (ANTECO)
- Time zone: UTC+8 (PST)
- ZIP code: 5706
- PSGC: 060602000
- IDD : area code: +63 (0)36
- Native languages: Karay-a; Hiligaynon; Tagalog
- Website: barbazaantique.gov.ph

Barbaza, officially the Municipality of Barbaza (Kinaray-a: Banwa kang Barbaza; Hiligaynon: Banwa sang Barbaza; Tagalog: Bayan ng Barbaza), is a municipality in the province of Antique, Philippines. According to the 2024 census, it has a population of 24,925 people.

== History ==
Long after the discovery of the Philippines by the Spaniards led by Ferdinand Magellan on March 16, 1521, there was already an established settlement in a place presumably now Barangay Esparar. In later years however, the Moros from Palawan and Mindoro started coming to raid and plunder the inhabitants, and often abducted beautiful maidens and men to be made slaves. Because of fear, the inhabitants moved to a much safer place, in a narrow strip of land at the foot of Mount Dumangsal. The site of the new settlement up to this day is called Igtara. The population rapidly increased. When the Moros stopped coming, they decided to move down to a much wider plain. The settlement started to flourish and later a church and a town hall were built out of bamboo and cogon grass. Today, it is where Barangay Binanu-an stands. Binanu-an means "Ginbanwahan or Binanwahan".

The formation of a formal government which was headed either by a Teniente or a captain, started at Binanu-an. The settlement in Binanu-an lasted so long until sometime in the 17th century when the inhabitants, again, found a much better place to live in because it is nearer to the sea which yields fish in abundance. They decided to transfer from Binanu-an to the seashore by the bank of the once deep river called Nalupa. The new settlement was named Nalupa Nuevo. Permanent structures like a church and a Municipal Hall were built.

Unfortunately, sometime in the 18th century the settlement suffered another drawback. Dalanas River, one of the bigger rivers in Antique, used to overflow during heavy rains causing destruction to properties and lives of people living near the area. Alarmed by the situation affecting the settlement at Nalupa Nuevo, the Spanish Governor Enrique Barboza ordered to transfer the people to another site called Otngol which was at that time, part of what is now the town of Laua-an.

During the transfer of the settlement from Nalupa to Otngol the Municipal Government was already run by a Capitan. The first Capitan was ('Tan) Julian Flores. He was later succeeded by ('Tan) Roman Francisco, then by Capitan Justiniano Ogatis-Barrientos. It was during his administration sometime in 1886 when he worked out for the separation of the town from the Municipality of Laua-an. The town's name was changed to Barboza in honor of Spanish Governor Enrique Barboza of Antique. The spelling was later changed to Barbaza because of the difficulty in pronouncing the former name. To this day the town is officially named the Municipality of Barbaza.

The 1818 Spanish census then recorded 2,342 native families in the area, living in harmony with 19 Spanish-Filipino families, back when Barbaza was called by its chief Barangay, San Antonio de Nalupa.

== Geography ==
According to the Philippine Statistics Authority, the municipality has a land area of 154.36 square kilometres (59.60 sq mi) constituting 5.66% of the 2,729.17-square-kilometre- (1,053.74 sq mi) total area of Antique. Located in the central portion of Antique, Barbaza is 62 kilometres (39 mi) north from the provincial capital, San Jose de Buenavista. Barbaza has a total coastline of 8.5 km (5.3 mi) along the Sulu Sea.

The mighty Dalanas River is the longest and largest river system in Barbaza with a total length of 34.6 km (21.5 mi) long and has a Drainage basin area of 192 km^{2} (74 sq mi), followed by Binangbang River 10.4 km (6.5 mi) and Nalupa River 5.3 km (3.3 mi).

Mount Nangtud is the second highest mountain in Panay Island located in the south west of Jamindan bordered in the North East of Barbaza, with an elevation of 6,804 feet (2,074 meters) above sea level. It is the second highest peak of Central Panay Mountain Range the longest and the largest mountain range in Western Visayas.

=== Climate ===
Climate data for Barbaza, Antique
Month	Jan	Feb	Mar	Apr	May	Jun	Jul	Aug	Sep	Oct	Nov	Dec	Year
Mean daily maximum °C (°F)	29 (84)	30 (86)	31 (88)	33 (91)	32 (90)	30 (86)	29 (84)	29 (84)	29 (84)	29 (84)	29 (84)	29 (84)	30 (86)
Mean daily minimum °C (°F)	22 (72)	22 (72)	22 (72)	24 (75)	25 (77)	25 (77)	25 (77)	25 (77)	25 (77)	24 (75)	24 (75)	23 (73)	24 (75)
Average precipitation mm (inches)	64 (2.5)	44 (1.7)	58 (2.3)	83 (3.3)	204 (8.0)	304 (12.0)	334 (13.1)	291 (11.5)	310 (12.2)	281 (11.1)	172 (6.8)	97 (3.8)	2,242 (88.3)
Average rainy days	12.5	8.9	11.3	14.1	24.2	28.0	29.6	28.2	28.1	28.1	20.2	15.2	248.4
Source: Meteoblue (modeled/calculated data, not measured locally)

=== Barangays ===
Barbaza is politically subdivided into 39 barangays. Each barangay consists of puroks and some have sitios.

It is composed of 22 upland and 17 lowland barangays where upland area accounts for 88.43% of the total land area.

PSGC	Barangay	Population			±% p.a.	
		2024		2010		
060602002	Baghari	1.1%	286	271	▴	0.38%
060602003	Bahuyan	3.1%	773	1,025	▾	−1.95%
060602004	Beri	3.6%	889	704	▴	1.64%
060602005	Biga-a	1.0%	244	294	▾	−1.29%
060602006	Binangbang	0.8%	201	211	▾	−0.34%
060602007	Binangbang Centro	3.3%	829	750	▴	0.70%
060602008	Binanu-an	1.8%	451	396	▴	0.91%
060602009	Cadiao	0.7%	184	252	▾	−2.17%
060602010	Calapadan	0.5%	125	122	▴	0.17%
060602011	Capoyuan	8.1%	2,026	2,016	▴	0.03%
060602012	Cubay	3.2%	792	777	▴	0.13%
060602018	Embrangga-an	1.4%	341	282	▴	1.33%
060602013	Esparar	4.3%	1,076	1,054	▴	0.14%
060602014	Gua	5.3%	1,309	1,231	▴	0.43%
060602015	Idao	1.0%	242	174	▴	2.32%
060602016	Igpalge	3.9%	978	943	▴	0.25%
060602017	Igtunarum	0.5%	131	127	▴	0.22%
060602019	Integasan	0.5%	114	106	▴	0.51%
060602020	Ipil	4.0%	1,002	935	▴	0.48%
060602021	Jinalinan	6.7%	1,661	1,033	▴	3.36%
060602022	Lanas	0.5%	129	104	▴	1.51%
060602023	Langcaon (Evelio Javier)	0.7%	184	198	▾	−0.51%
060602024	Lisub	3.1%	764	570	▴	2.06%
060602025	Lombuyan	2.8%	706	669	▴	0.38%
060602026	Mablad	2.4%	609	552	▴	0.69%
060602027	Magtulis	1.9%	477	403	▴	1.18%
060602028	Marigne	0.8%	203	236	▾	−1.04%
060602029	Mayabay	1.1%	274	219	▴	1.57%
060602030	Mayos	0.9%	219	210	▴	0.29%
060602031	Nalusdan	0.8%	197	860	▾	−9.75%
060602032	Narirong	0.9%	215	202	▴	0.44%
060602033	Palma	5.7%	1,417	1,392	▴	0.12%
060602034	Poblacion	5.7%	1,428	1,369	▴	0.29%
060602035	San Antonio	2.7%	677	657	▴	0.21%
060602036	San Ramon	0.7%	167	180	▾	−0.52%
060602037	Soligao	1.1%	277	231	▴	1.27%
060602038	Tabongtabong	1.9%	465	447	▴	0.28%
060602039	Tig-Alaran	0.5%	121	118	▴	0.17%
060602040	Yapo	2.1%	521	455	▴	0.95%
	Total		24,925	21,775	▴	0.95%

== Demographics ==
Population census of Barbaza
Year	Pop.	±% p.a.
1903	5,929	—
1918	7,576	+1.65%
1939	8,224	+0.39%
1948	11,225	+3.52%
1960	10,222	−0.78%
1970	12,812	+2.28%
1975	13,404	+0.91%
1980	14,703	+1.87%
1990	14,984	+0.19%
1995	17,313	+2.74%
2000	18,597	+1.55%
2007	20,709	+1.49%
2010	21,775	+1.84%
2015	22,704	+0.80%
2020	23,359	+0.60%
2024	24,925	+1.57%
Source: Philippine Statistics Authority

In the 2024 census, Barbaza had a population of 24,925 people. The population density was 160 inhabitants per square kilometre (410/sq mi).

About 94% of the total population have access to potable water.

== Economy ==
Poverty incidence of Barbaza

Source: Philippine Statistics Authority

Major sources of income of the people are derived from agriculture, fishing, trade and commerce, employment and remittances from abroad.

== Tourism ==
- Mount Nangtud – is the second-highest peak in Panay island and shared with the border of Jamindan, Capiz with an elevation of 6,804 ft (2,074 m) above sea level. Mount Nangtud is rich for its diverse flora and fauna and a Mossy forest. It is one of the most difficult and technically challenging mountain in Panay. Alongside with Mount Madja-as in Culasi and Mount Baloy in Valderrama.
- Batabat and Punta Coral Reefs – feature diversities of tropical fishes and distinct coral formations in vibrant colors
- Dalanas River - is Barbaza largest river with a total length of 33 km (21 mi) long from it source located in Mount Madjaas to its mouth in Sulu Sea. Its provides large amount supplies of water for Agricultural land area in Barbaza lowland. Dalanas Bridge is a 1,512 ft (461 m) is Antique second longest Bridge.
- Camp Eupre Forest and Orchard Resort - Located in Bgy. Cadiao
- Macalbag Waterfalls – 50-foot waterfalls with uncharted caves
- Cadiao Falls - Located in Bgy. Cadiao
- Sigbungon Falls - Located in Bgy. San Ramon
- Sayay Falls - Located in Bgy. San Ramon
- Barbaza Catholic Church – considered as the most modernly designed church in the province of Antique

== Culture ==
=== Festivals ===
Barbaza celebrates the annual Batabat Festival, held every 3rd week of March. The feast of Saint Anthony of Padua is celebrated every 13 June.

== Transportation ==
Transportation services are generally provided by tricycles, jeepneys, vans and buses. There are also daily buses available going back and forth to Manila that pass by Barbaza via the roll-on/roll-off nautical highway. Barbaza has a total road length of 52.7 km (32.7 mi), including a 10.2 km (6.3 mi) National Highway. Dalanas Bridge, with a length of 1,530 ft (470 m), is the second longest bridge in Antique. Other bridges are the Binangbang Bridge (130 ft (40 m)) and Ipil Bridge (105 ft (32 m)).

== Healthcare ==
There are five health centers that serve 39 barangays. The town also has a government hospital with 10 beds and 27 health workers.

== Education ==
The Barbaza Schools District Office governs all educational institutions within the municipality. It oversees the management and operations of all private and public, from primary to secondary schools.

=== Primary and elementary schools ===
- Bahoyan-Yapo Elementary School
- Barbaza Central School
- Barbaza MPC Learning Center
- Binangbang Elementary School
- Cadiao Primary School
- Capoyu-an Elementary School
- Esparar Elementary School
- Gua Elementary School
- Igpalge Elementary School
- Ipil-Jinalinan Elementary School
- Jireh Learning Center
- Lumboyan Elementary School
- Magtulis Elementary School
- Mayabay Elementary School
- Mayos Elementary School
- Narirong Elementary School
- San Antonio Elementary School
- Soligao Elementary School
- Tabong-tabong Elementary School

=== Secondary schools ===
- Barbaza National High School
- St. Anthony's High School

== Notable personalities ==
- Felimon Espares, Filipino politician
