= Mount Madja-as =

Mountain in the Philippines

Coordinates: 11°23′21″N 122°09′46″E

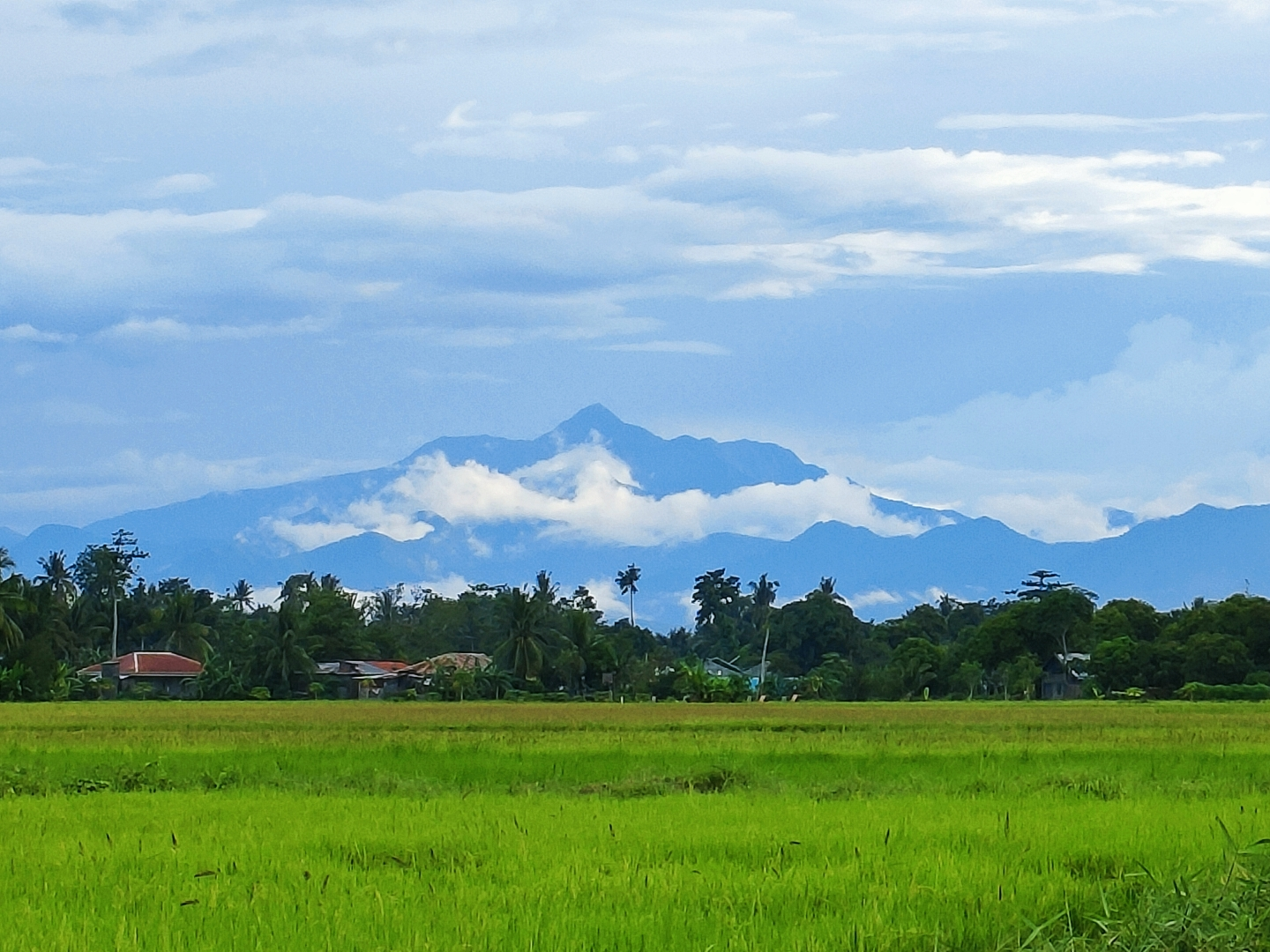
- Mount Madja-as in Culasi, Antique, as seen from Aklan

Highest point
- Elevation: 6,946 ft (2,117 m)
- Prominence: 6,946 ft (2,117 m)
- Listing: 1st-highest point in Antique; 1st-highest peak on Panay island; 2nd-highest mountain in the Visayas; 9th-most prominent mountain in the Philippines; 61st-highest peak of an island in the world; Ultra prominent peak

Geography
- Location within Visayas Location within Philippines
- Location: Panay
- Country: Philippines
- Province: Antique
- Parent range: Central Panay Mountain Range

Geology
- Mountain type: dormant volcano
- Last eruption: unknown

Climbing
- First ascent: unknown
- Easiest route: Flores Trail and Alojipan Trail in Culasi, Antique; Panipiason Trail in Madalag, Aklan

Mount Madja-as is the highest peak on the island of Panay and Western Visayas region in the Philippines, second highest mountain in the entire Visayas, after Mount Kanlaon on Negros. With an elevation of 6,946 feet (2,117 meters) above sea level, it is the 61st-highest peak of an island in the world and the 9th-most prominent mountain in the Philippines. The mountain is most famous for its crown shyness forest, mossy forest, sea of clouds and rich for its diverse flora and fauna and 14 waterfalls down to its slopes. Located in Culasi, Antique, dominating the landscape for miles around as far as 76 kilometers, the view of the mountain is still visible from Kalibo, Aklan, overlooking to the southwest.

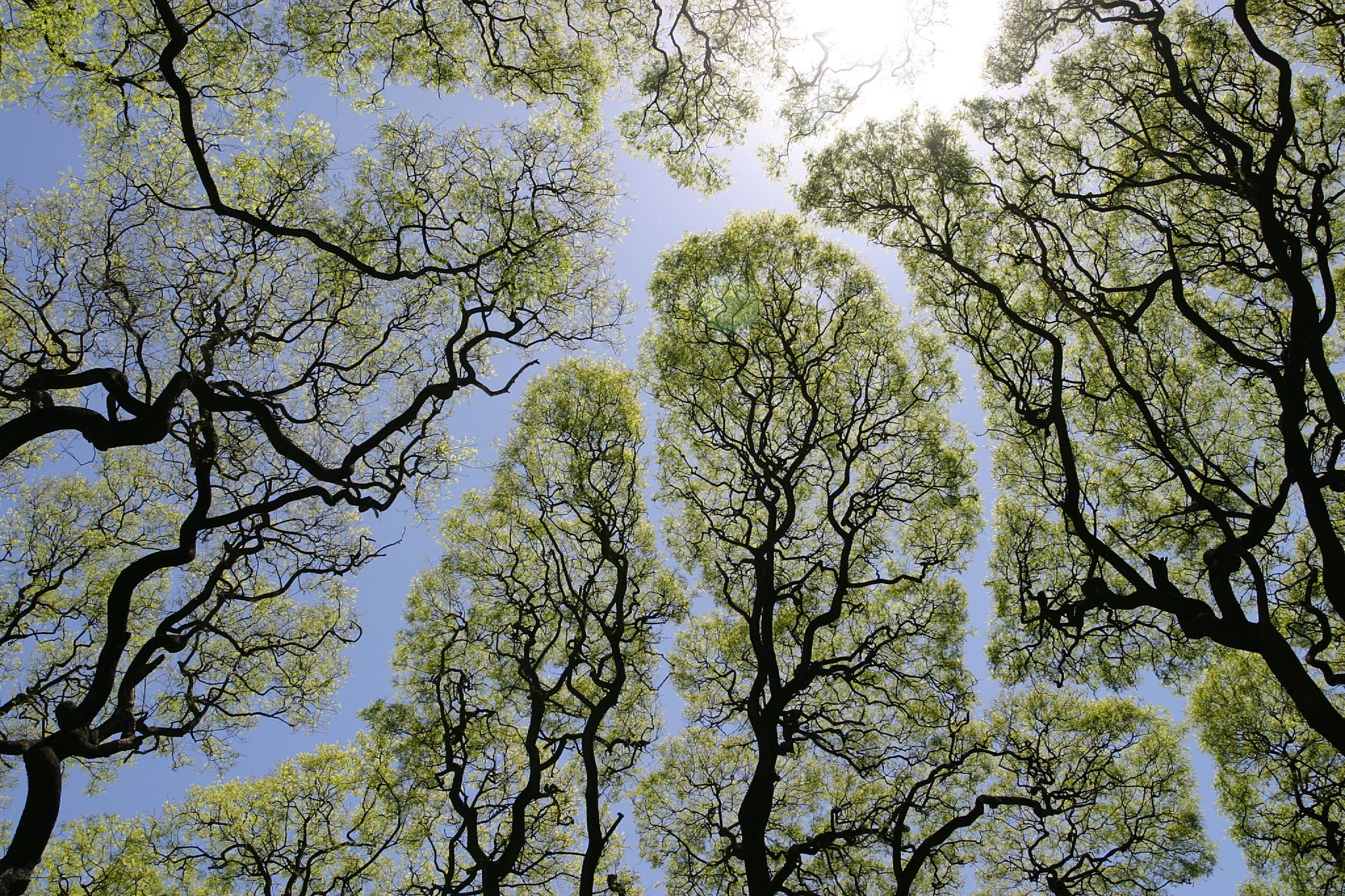
The Crown shyness forest

Mount Madja-as summit is covered by a mossy forest. It is the highest peak of the Central Panay Mountain Range, the longest and the largest mountain range in Panay island and Western Visayas.

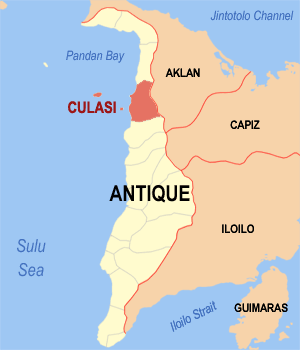
Location of Culasi in Antique

Madja-as is technically one of the most challenging mountains to climb in Visayas, alongside Mount Baloy, Mount Nangtud and Mount Kanlaon. The Panipiason Trail is technically most difficult in Madja-as, located in Panipiason, Madalag, Aklan and the easiest route are Flores trail and Alojipan trail, located in Culasi, Antique.

== History ==
The mountain has been regarded as one of the most sacred abodes in the Visayas since ancient times, as it is said to have been the repository of Sidapa's ancient sacred tree that is used to measure mortal lives. In mythology, the god of meteors, Bulalakaw, and supreme goddess of the Hiligaynon, Kanlaon, are said to have lived in the mountain prior to their change of abode. Pandaki, god of second chances, is also said to occasionally visit the mountain.

== Geography ==
Its summit is 2,117 metres (6,946 ft) above sea level, and it is covered by misty forest. Madja-as in Kinaray-a, means "mataas", "high" or "lofty". The name of the mountain is also associated with Madja-as, a confederation in Panay which existed after the 11th century. It is located in the town of Culasi in Antique Province. The legendary mountain of Madja-as has been part of Antiqueño's culture, history and literature.

It has a total of 14 waterfalls and the source of four major rivers in Northern Antique, the mighty Dalanas River, Tibiao River, Bacong River, Mali-ao River and the neighboring province of Aklan the tributary of Aklan River the Timbaban River and Dumarayray River. One can see some of the biggest waterfalls like white strands in the slopes of the mountain. To the southeast face Mount Madja-as facing to its neighboring rival, the 6,804 ft (2,074 m) Mount Nangtud the second highest peak in Panay separated by Dalanas and Kigas River 14 kilometres (8.7 mi) from Mount Madja-as.

== Mythology ==
According to Visayan mythology, the mountain is home to Sidapa, the handsome and robust god of death and war who wore a crown made of golden horns. Sidapa is believed to possess a very tall tree where he measures the lives of all the new-born, and places a mark on the tree. When the person's stature equals the mark provided, the person dies immediately. Afterwards, Sidapa will reap the kalag (soul) of a person and bring it to Magwayen, who in turn brings the soul to Salud or Saad (place of the dead). Sidapa is said to determine the life force of a person by using magical trees in his mountain home.

Bulalakaw, the god of meteors, also lived in the mountain. Sidapa and Bulalakaw are known to be good friends. Bulalakaw later chose to dwell in the sky to formally take on the role as god of meteors. Pandaki, the god of second chances, is said to occasionally visit Sidapa, who he is very fond of and loyal to. The supreme goddess, Kanlaon, is believed to have lived in Mount Madja-as for some time as well, however, she later transferred her abode to Mount Kanlaon in Negros island after the Hiligaynon epic heroes Kan and Laon slayed the dragon-like monster that lived in Mount Kanlaon.

== Popular media ==
On March 28, 2021, Mount Madja-as was featured on GMA Network evening show weekend, Kapuso Mo, Jessica Soho. Featuring Mount Madjaas summit and sea of clouds, Bonzai mossy forest and crown shyness forest, the Enchanted Bantang River, pitcher plants, orchids and Madjaas trail.

On February 25, 2021, Mount Madja-as went viral for the first time on social media after ABS-CBN News posted some photos of the mossy and enchanted crown shyness forest covering Mount Madja-as summit, shared by the mountaineer Ompz Felicio.

== Hiking Activities ==
Hiking to the summit of Mount Madja-as is 2 to 3 days hikes via Flores Trail, with 8/9 difficulty. one of the most challenging and toughest mountain to climb in the Visayas. The jump off start at Barangay Flores in Culasi, Antique. To the East-Face of Madja-as, is the hardest and technically most difficult to climb, the Panipiason Trail in Madalag, Aklan.

Josue Alejo, known as " tatay Josue " he was a legendary lead guide to the summit of Mount Madjaas.

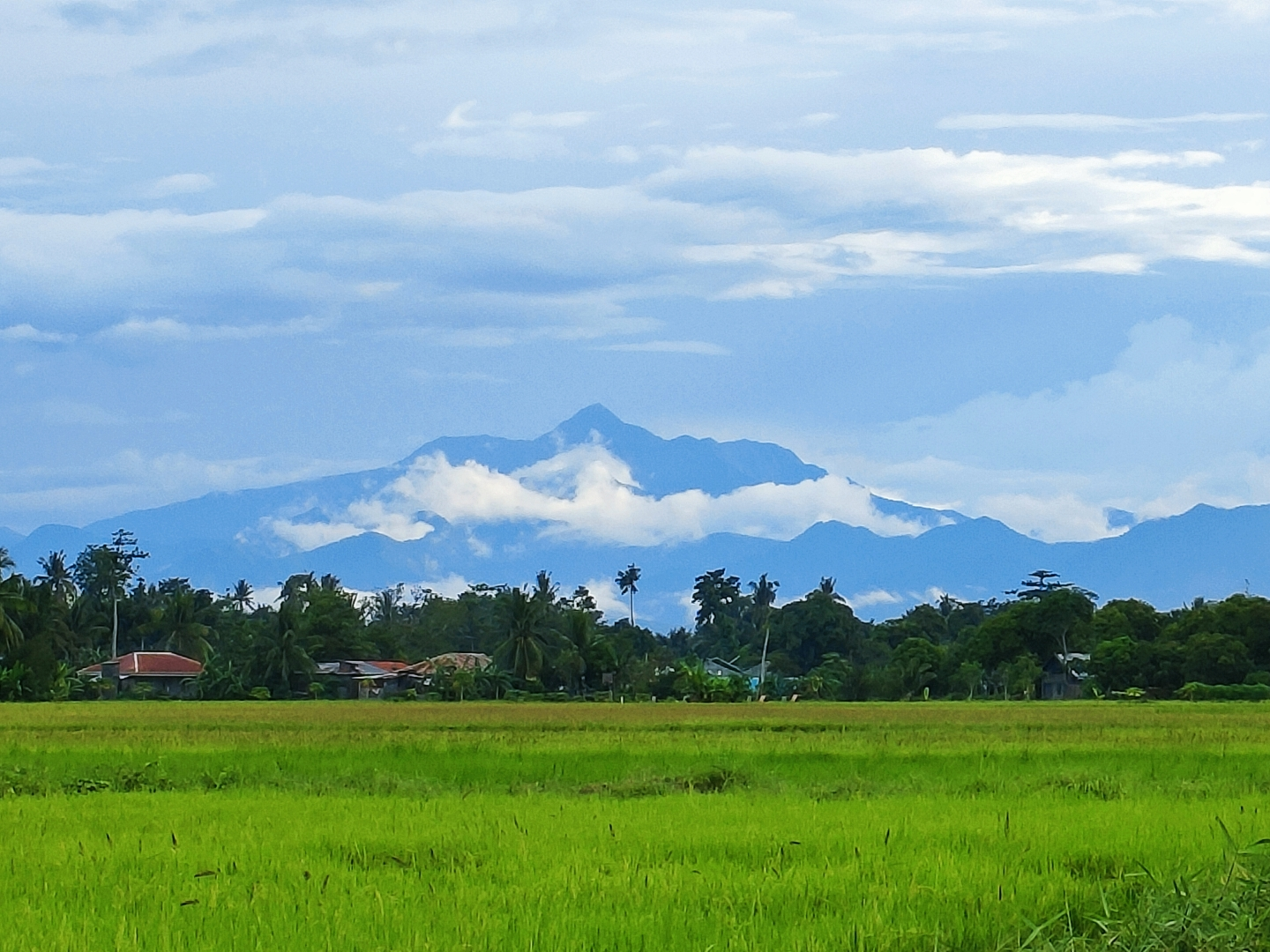
Mount Madja-as east face, as seen from Aklan

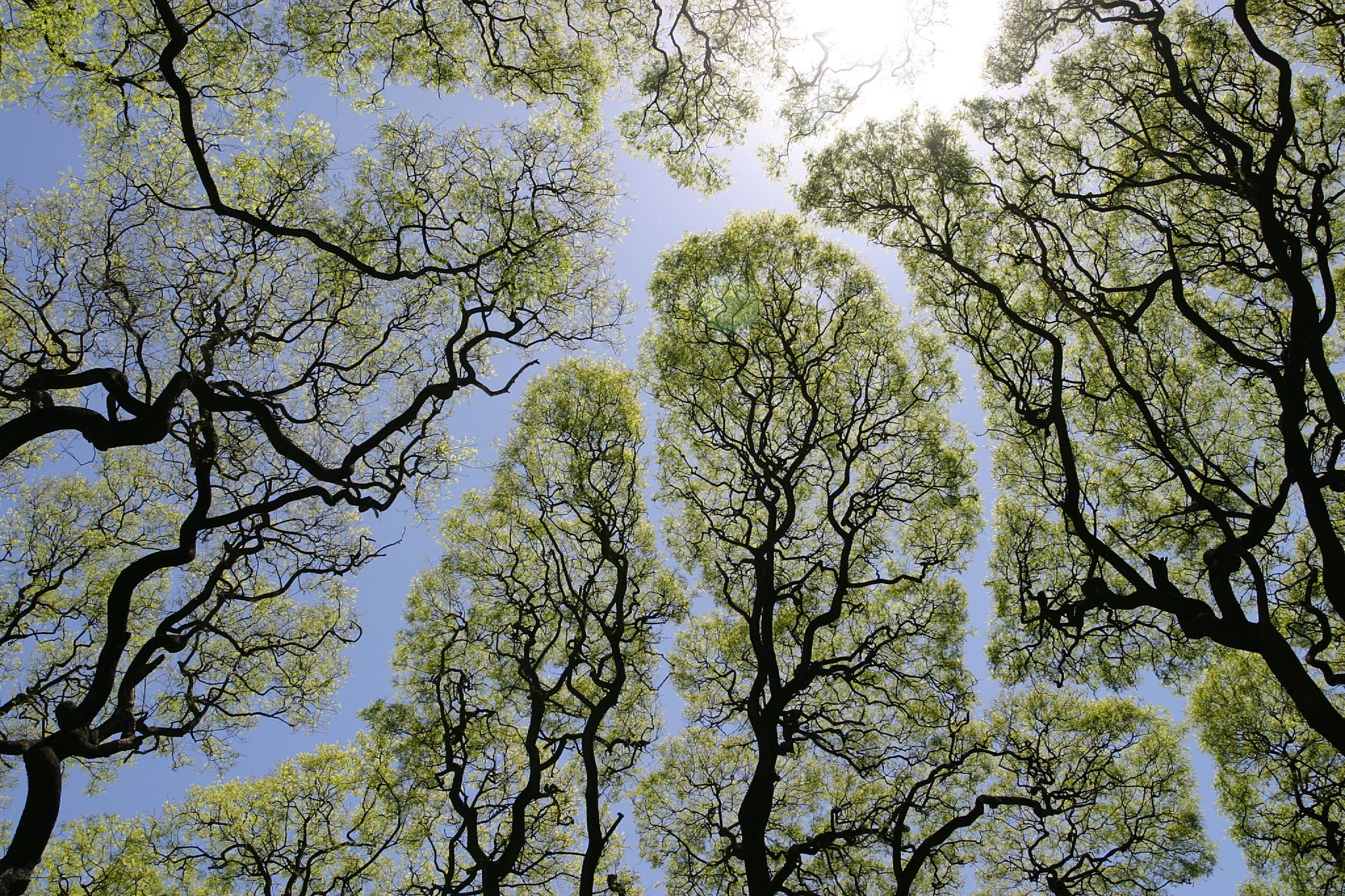
The Crown shyness forest

=== 2003 disappearance ===
In March 2003 a solo hiker identified as Elyovic Gutierrez, from Cavite, disappeared, seemingly without a trace in Mount Madja-as, as he was descending from the mountain. The search lasted for weeks by the local government and rescue helicopter and his fate remains unknown.

== Points of interest ==
1. Mount Madja-as Summit
2. Mount Madja-as crown shyness forest
3. Mount Madja-as Sea of clouds
4. Mount Madja-as mossy forest
5. The Enchanted " Bantang River "
6. Libug Falls
7. Sitio Kamandiga
8. Barangay Flores
9. Barangay Alojipan
10. Dinawan Lake (Tinagong Dagat)
11. Mount Madja-as Pine trees
12. Mount Madjaas Pitcher plant

== See also ==
- List of ultras of the Philippines
