= Legislative districts of Capiz =

Districts of Philippine province

The legislative districts of Capiz are the representation of the province of Capiz in the various national legislatures of the Philippines. The province is currently represented in the lower house of the Congress of the Philippines through its first and second congressional districts.

== History ==
Capiz initially comprised a single district to the Malolos Congress from 1898 to 1899. It was later divided into three legislative districts from 1907 to 1957, when Aklan was granted its own representation, reducing it to two legislative districts. Romblon was also represented as part of the third district from 1907 to 1919.

In the disruption caused by the Second World War, two delegates represented the province in the National Assembly of the Japanese-sponsored Second Philippine Republic: one was the provincial governor (an ex officio member), while the other was elected through a provincial assembly of KALIBAPI members during the Japanese occupation of the Philippines. Upon the restoration of the Philippine Commonwealth in 1945, the province continued to comprise three districts.

Capiz was part of the representation of Region VI from 1978 to 1984, and from 1984 to 1986 it elected two assemblymen at-large.

== Current districts and representatives ==
Political parties

Independent (1)
Lakas–CMD (1)

Legislative districts and congressional representatives of Capiz
District	Current representative	Constituent LGUs	Population (2015)	Area
1st	Ivan Howard Guintu (since 2025); Roxas City	List: Maayon; Panay; Panitan; Pilar; Pontevedra; President Roxas; Roxas City	413,213	730.41 km^{2}
2nd	Jane Castro (since 2022); Dumalag	List: Cuartero; Dao; Dumalag; Dumarao; Ivisan; Jamindan; Mambusao; Sapian; Sigma; Tapaz	348,171	1,864.23 km^{2}

== Defunct districts ==
=== 3rd District ===
- Municipalities: Buruanga, Ibajay, Kalibo, Libacao, Makato (Taft), Malinao, Nabas, Numancia (Lezo), Lezo (re-established 1941), Tangalan (re-established 1948), Madalag (re-established 1948), Malay (established 1949)

Period	Representative
5th Philippine Legislature; 1919–1922	Eufrosino Alba
6th Philippine Legislature; 1922–1925	Manuel Terencio
7th Philippine Legislature; 1925–1928	Manuel Laserna
8th Philippine Legislature; 1928–1931	Teodulfo Suñer
9th Philippine Legislature; 1931–1934	Rufino L. Garde
10th Philippine Legislature; 1934–1935	Rafael S. Tumbokon
1st National Assembly; 1935–1938	Rafael S. Tumbokon
2nd National Assembly; 1938–1941	Juan M. Reyes
1st Commonwealth Congress; 1945	vacant (Note: Juan M. Reyes was elected in November 1941 but died before the start of the session on June 9, 1945.)
1st Congress; 1946–1949	Jose M. Reyes
2nd Congress; 1949–1953	Godofredo P. Ramos
3rd Congress; 1953–1957	Godofredo P. Ramos

==== 1907–1909 ====
- Municipalities: Badajoz, Buruanga, Cajidiocan, Calivo, Ibajay, Libacao, Looc, Malinao, Nabas, Odiongan, Romblon, San Fernando, Taft

Period	Representative
1st Philippine Legislature; 1907–1909	Simeon Mobo

==== 1909–1919 ====
- Municipalities: Badajoz, Buruanga, Cajidiocan, Ibajay, Looc, Malinao, Nabas, Odiongan, Romblon, San Fernando, Taft, Jones (re-established 1918)

Period	Representative
2nd Philippine Legislature; 1909–1912	Braulio C. Manikan
3rd Philippine Legislature; 1912–1916	Jose Tirol
4th Philippine Legislature; 1916–1919	Leonardo Festin

=== At-large district ===
==== 1898–1899 ====
Period	Representatives
Malolos Congress; 1898–1899	Miguel Zaragoza
Malolos Congress; 1898–1899	Mariano Bacani
Malolos Congress; 1898–1899	Juan Baltazar

==== 1943-1944 ====
Period	Representative
National Assembly; 1943–1944	Eduardo Abalo
National Assembly; 1943–1944	Alfredo V. Jacinto (ex officio)

==== 1984-1986 ====
Period	Representative
Regular Batasang Pambansa; 1984–1986	Enrique M. Belo
Regular Batasang Pambansa; 1984–1986	Charles B. Escolin

== See also ==
- Legislative districts of Aklan
- Legislative district of Romblon
