= Capiz's 2nd congressional district =

Congressional district of the Philippines

- Constituency for the House of Representatives of the Philippines
- Map
- Location of Capiz within the Philippines
- Province: Capiz
- Region: Western Visayas
- Population: 348,171 (2015)
- Electorate: 252,525 (2025)
- Major settlements: 10 LGUs: Municipalities; Cuartero; Dao; Dumalag; Dumarao; Ivisan; Jamindan; Mambusao; Sapian; Sigma; Tapaz
- Area: 1,864.23 km^{2} (719.78 sq mi)

Current constituency
- Created: 1907
- Representative: Jane T. Castro
- Political party: Lakas–CMD; One Capiz
- Congressional bloc: Majority

Capiz's 2nd congressional district is one of the two congressional districts of the Philippines in the province of Capiz. It has been represented in the House of Representatives of the Philippines since 1916 and earlier in the Philippine Assembly from 1907 to 1916. The district consists of the municipalities of Cuartero, Dao, Dumalag, Dumarao, Ivisan, Jamindan, Mambusao, Sapian, Sigma and Tapaz. It is currently represented in the 20th Congress by Jane T. Castro of the Lakas–CMD and One Capiz.

== List of members representing the district ==
=== Philippine Assembly (1907–1916) ===
Portrait	Member (Lifespan)	Term of office	Party	Legislature	Electoral history	Constituencies
District created January 9, 1907.
	Jose Altavas (1877–1952)	October 16, 1907 – October 16, 1909	Independent	1st Legislature	Elected in 1907.	1907–1909; Dumalag, Dumarao, Ivisan, Jamindan, Mambusao, New Washington, Sapian, Sigma, Tapaz
	Leocadio Pajarillo	October 16, 1909 – October 16, 1912	Independent	2nd Legislature	Elected in 1909.	1909–1912; Calivo, Dumalag, Jamindan, Lezo, Libacao, Mambusao, New Washington, Sapian, Sigma, Tapaz
	Simeon Dadivas	October 16, 1912 – July 27, 1914 (Note: Died in office.)	Nacionalista	3rd Legislature	Elected in 1912. Died.	1912–1916; Banga, Calivo, Dumalag, Jamindan, Lezo, Libacao, Mambusao, New Washington, Sapian, Sigma, Tapaz
Vacant (July 27 – October 10, 1914)				3rd Legislature	—	1912–1916; Banga, Calivo, Dumalag, Jamindan, Lezo, Libacao, Mambusao, New Washington, Sapian, Sigma, Tapaz
	Emiliano Acevedo	October 10, 1914 – October 16, 1916	Progresista	3rd Legislature	Elected in 1914 to finish Dadivas's term.	1912–1916; Banga, Calivo, Dumalag, Jamindan, Lezo, Libacao, Mambusao, New Washington, Sapian, Sigma, Tapaz

=== House of Representatives (1916–1935) ===
Portrait	Member (Lifespan)	Term of office	Party	Legislature	Electoral history	Constituencies
	Leopoldo Alba Mobo	October 16, 1916 – June 3, 1919	Nacionalista	4th Legislature	Elected in 1916.	1916–1919; Banga, Calivo, Dumalag, Jamindan, Lezo, Libacao, Mambusao, New Washington, Sapian, Sigma, Tapaz
	Jose A. Urquiola	June 3, 1919 – June 6, 1922	Nacionalista	5th Legislature	Elected in 1919.	1919–1931; Altavas, Balete, Banga, Dumalag, Jamindan, Mambusao, New Washington, Sapian, Sigma, Tapaz
	Agustin Aldea	June 6, 1922 – June 2, 1925	Nacionalista Colectivista	6th Legislature	Elected in 1922.	1919–1931; Altavas, Balete, Banga, Dumalag, Jamindan, Mambusao, New Washington, Sapian, Sigma, Tapaz
	Jose Altavas (1877–1952)	June 2, 1925 – June 5, 1928	Nacionalista Consolidado	7th Legislature	Elected in 1925.	1919–1931; Altavas, Balete, Banga, Dumalag, Jamindan, Mambusao, New Washington, Sapian, Sigma, Tapaz
	Jose A. Dorado (1893–1984)	June 5, 1928 – November 15, 1935	Nacionalista Consolidado	8th Legislature	Elected in 1928.	1919–1931; Altavas, Balete, Banga, Dumalag, Jamindan, Mambusao, New Washington, Sapian, Sigma, Tapaz
	Jose A. Dorado (1893–1984)	June 5, 1928 – November 15, 1935	Nacionalista Consolidado	9th Legislature	Re-elected in 1931.	1931–1935; Altavas, Balete, Banga, Batan, Dumalag, Jamindan, Mambusao, New Washington, Sapian, Sigma, Tapaz
	Jose A. Dorado (1893–1984)	June 5, 1928 – November 15, 1935	Nacionalista Democrata Pro-Independencia	10th Legislature	Re-elected in 1934.	1931–1935; Altavas, Balete, Banga, Batan, Dumalag, Jamindan, Mambusao, New Washington, Sapian, Sigma, Tapaz

=== 1934 Constitutional Convention (1934–1935) ===
Seat A					Seat B					Legislature	Constituencies
Portrait	Member (Lifespan)	Term of office	Party	Electoral history	Portrait	Member (Lifespan)	Term of office	Party	Electoral history	Legislature	Constituencies
	Antonio A. Arcenas	July 30, 1934 – February 19, 1935	Nonpartisan	Elected in 1934.		Cornelio Villareal (1904–1992)	July 30, 1934 – February 19, 1935	Nonpartisan	Elected in 1934.	1934 Constitutional Convention	1934–1935; Altavas, Balete, Banga, Batan, Dumalag, Jamindan, Mambusao, New Washington, Sapian, Sigma, Tapaz

=== National Assembly (1935–1945) ===
==== Commonwealth ====
Portrait	Member (Lifespan)	Term of office	Party	Legislature	Electoral history	Constituencies
	Jose A. Dorado (1893–1984)	November 15, 1935 – December 30, 1941	Nacionalista Democrata Pro-Independencia	1st National Assembly	Re-elected in 1935.	1935–1941; Altavas, Balete, Banga, Batan, Dumalag, Jamindan, Mambusao, New Washington, Sapian, Sigma, Tapaz
	Jose A. Dorado (1893–1984)	November 15, 1935 – December 30, 1941	Nacionalista	2nd National Assembly	Re-elected in 1938.	1935–1941; Altavas, Balete, Banga, Batan, Dumalag, Jamindan, Mambusao, New Washington, Sapian, Sigma, Tapaz
District dissolved into the two-seat Capiz's at-large district for the Second Republic National Assembly.

=== House of Representatives (1945–1973) ===
Portrait	Member (Lifespan)	Term of office	Party	Legislature	Electoral history	Constituencies
District re-created May 24, 1945.
	Cornelio Villareal (1904–1992)	June 9, 1945 – January 17, 1973	Nacionalista	1st Commonwealth Congress	Elected in 1941.	1945–1957; Altavas, Balete, Banga, Batan, Dumalag, Jamindan, Mambusao, New Washington, Sapian, Sigma, Tapaz
	Cornelio Villareal (1904–1992)	June 9, 1945 – January 17, 1973	Liberal	2nd Commonwealth Congress	Re-elected in 1946.	1945–1957; Altavas, Balete, Banga, Batan, Dumalag, Jamindan, Mambusao, New Washington, Sapian, Sigma, Tapaz
	Cornelio Villareal (1904–1992)	June 9, 1945 – January 17, 1973	Liberal	1st Congress	Re-elected in 1946.	1945–1957; Altavas, Balete, Banga, Batan, Dumalag, Jamindan, Mambusao, New Washington, Sapian, Sigma, Tapaz
	Cornelio Villareal (1904–1992)	June 9, 1945 – January 17, 1973	Liberal	2nd Congress	Re-elected in 1949.	1945–1957; Altavas, Balete, Banga, Batan, Dumalag, Jamindan, Mambusao, New Washington, Sapian, Sigma, Tapaz
	Cornelio Villareal (1904–1992)	June 9, 1945 – January 17, 1973	Liberal	3rd Congress	Re-elected in 1953.	1945–1957; Altavas, Balete, Banga, Batan, Dumalag, Jamindan, Mambusao, New Washington, Sapian, Sigma, Tapaz
	Cornelio Villareal (1904–1992)	June 9, 1945 – January 17, 1973	Liberal	4th Congress	Re-elected in 1957.	1957–1973; Dumalag, Jamindan, Mambusao, Sapian, Sigma, Tapaz
	Cornelio Villareal (1904–1992)	June 9, 1945 – January 17, 1973	Liberal	5th Congress	Re-elected in 1961.	1957–1973; Dumalag, Jamindan, Mambusao, Sapian, Sigma, Tapaz
	Cornelio Villareal (1904–1992)	June 9, 1945 – January 17, 1973	Liberal	6th Congress	Re-elected in 1965.	1957–1973; Dumalag, Jamindan, Mambusao, Sapian, Sigma, Tapaz
	Cornelio Villareal (1904–1992)	June 9, 1945 – January 17, 1973	Liberal	7th Congress	Re-elected in 1969. Term cut short upon the ratification of a new Constitution.	1957–1973; Dumalag, Jamindan, Mambusao, Sapian, Sigma, Tapaz
District dissolved into the sixteen-seat Region VI's at-large district for the Interim Batasang Pambansa, followed by the two-seat Capiz's at-large district for the Regular Batasang Pambansa.

=== 1971 Constitutional Convention (1971–1972) ===
Seat A					Seat B					Legislature	Constituencies
Portrait	Member (Lifespan)	Term of office	Party	Electoral history	Portrait	Member (Lifespan)	Term of office	Party	Electoral history	Legislature	Constituencies
	Dandy Tupaz	June 1, 1971 – November 29, 1972	Nonpartisan	Elected in 1970.		Pedro Exmundo	June 1, 1971 – November 29, 1972	Nonpartisan	Elected in 1970.	1971 Constitutional Convention	1971–1972; Dumalag, Jamindan, Mambusao, Sapian, Sigma, Tapaz

=== House of Representatives (1987–present) ===
Portrait	Member (Lifespan)	Term of office	Party	Legislature	Electoral history	Constituencies
District re-created February 2, 1987.
	Cornelio Villareal (1904–1992)	June 30, 1987 – June 30, 1992	Liberal	8th Congress	Elected in 1987.	1987–present Cuartero, Dao, Dumalag, Dumarao, Ivisan, Jamindan, Mambusao, Sapian, Sigma, Tapaz
	Vicente Andaya Jr.	June 30, 1992 – June 30, 2001	Lakas	9th Congress	Elected in 1992.	1987–present Cuartero, Dao, Dumalag, Dumarao, Ivisan, Jamindan, Mambusao, Sapian, Sigma, Tapaz
	Vicente Andaya Jr.	June 30, 1992 – June 30, 2001	Lakas	10th Congress	Re-elected in 1995.	1987–present Cuartero, Dao, Dumalag, Dumarao, Ivisan, Jamindan, Mambusao, Sapian, Sigma, Tapaz
	Vicente Andaya Jr.	June 30, 1992 – June 30, 2001	Lakas	11th Congress	Re-elected in 1998.	1987–present Cuartero, Dao, Dumalag, Dumarao, Ivisan, Jamindan, Mambusao, Sapian, Sigma, Tapaz
	Fredenil Castro (born 1951)	June 30, 2001 – June 30, 2010	Liberal	12th Congress	Elected in 2001.	1987–present Cuartero, Dao, Dumalag, Dumarao, Ivisan, Jamindan, Mambusao, Sapian, Sigma, Tapaz
	Fredenil Castro (born 1951)	June 30, 2001 – June 30, 2010	Liberal	13th Congress	Re-elected in 2004.	1987–present Cuartero, Dao, Dumalag, Dumarao, Ivisan, Jamindan, Mambusao, Sapian, Sigma, Tapaz
	Fredenil Castro (born 1951)	June 30, 2001 – June 30, 2010	Lakas	14th Congress	Re-elected in 2007.	1987–present Cuartero, Dao, Dumalag, Dumarao, Ivisan, Jamindan, Mambusao, Sapian, Sigma, Tapaz
	Jane T. Castro (born 1958)	June 30, 2010 – June 30, 2013	Lakas (until 2011)	15th Congress	Elected in 2010.	1987–present Cuartero, Dao, Dumalag, Dumarao, Ivisan, Jamindan, Mambusao, Sapian, Sigma, Tapaz
	Jane T. Castro (born 1958)	June 30, 2010 – June 30, 2013	NUP (from 2011)	15th Congress	Elected in 2010.	1987–present Cuartero, Dao, Dumalag, Dumarao, Ivisan, Jamindan, Mambusao, Sapian, Sigma, Tapaz
	Fredenil Castro (born 1951)	June 30, 2013 – June 30, 2022	NUP (until 2018)	16th Congress	Elected in 2013.	1987–present Cuartero, Dao, Dumalag, Dumarao, Ivisan, Jamindan, Mambusao, Sapian, Sigma, Tapaz
	Fredenil Castro (born 1951)	June 30, 2013 – June 30, 2022	NUP (until 2018)	17th Congress	Re-elected in 2016.	1987–present Cuartero, Dao, Dumalag, Dumarao, Ivisan, Jamindan, Mambusao, Sapian, Sigma, Tapaz
	Fredenil Castro (born 1951)	June 30, 2013 – June 30, 2022	Lakas (from 2018)	17th Congress	Re-elected in 2016.	1987–present Cuartero, Dao, Dumalag, Dumarao, Ivisan, Jamindan, Mambusao, Sapian, Sigma, Tapaz
	Fredenil Castro (born 1951)	June 30, 2013 – June 30, 2022	Lakas (from 2018)	18th Congress	Re-elected in 2019.	1987–present Cuartero, Dao, Dumalag, Dumarao, Ivisan, Jamindan, Mambusao, Sapian, Sigma, Tapaz
	Jane T. Castro (born 1958)	June 30, 2022 – present	Lakas (One Capiz)	19th Congress	Elected in 2022.	1987–present Cuartero, Dao, Dumalag, Dumarao, Ivisan, Jamindan, Mambusao, Sapian, Sigma, Tapaz
	Jane T. Castro (born 1958)	June 30, 2022 – present	Lakas (One Capiz)	20th Congress	Re-elected in 2025.	1987–present Cuartero, Dao, Dumalag, Dumarao, Ivisan, Jamindan, Mambusao, Sapian, Sigma, Tapaz

== Election results ==
=== 2010 ===
2010 Philippine House of Representatives election in Capiz
Party	Candidate	Votes	%
Lakas–Kampi	Jane T. Castro (incumbent)	109,147	69.51
Liberal	Roberto Lastimoso	47,885	30.49
Valid ballots		157,032	95.07
Invalid or blank votes		8,148	4.93
Total votes		165,180	100.00
Lakas–Kampi hold			

=== 2013 ===
2013 Philippine House of Representatives election in Capiz
Party	Candidate	Votes	%
NUP	Fredenil Castro	77,293	56.37
Liberal	Maria Andaya	59,829	43.63
Valid ballots		137,122	93.50
Invalid or blank votes		9,536	6.50
Total votes		146,658	100.00
NUP hold			

=== 2016 ===
2016 Philippine House of Representatives election in Capiz
Party	Candidate	Votes	%
NUP	Fredenil Castro (incumbent)	118,433	100.00
Valid ballots		118,433	64.99
Invalid or blank votes		63,800	35.01
Total votes		182,233	100.00
NUP hold			

=== 2019 ===
2019 Philippine House of Representatives election in Capiz
Party	Candidate	Votes	%
Lakas	Fredenil Castro (incumbent)	136,929	95.86
PDDS	Maria Vilma Besada	5,907	4.14
Total votes		142,836	100.00
Lakas hold			

=== 2022 ===
2022 Philippine House of Representatives election in Capiz
Party	Candidate	Votes	%
Lakas	Jane T. Castro	110,609	58.92
PDP–Laban	Jun Labao	73,243	39.02
PROMDI	Bulilit Martinez	3,861	2.06
Total votes		187,713	100.00
Lakas hold			

=== 2025 ===
2025 Philippine House of Representatives election in Capiz
Party	Candidate	Votes	%
Lakas	Jane T. Castro (incumbent)	157,199	100.00
Valid ballots		157,199	73.39
Invalid or blank votes		56,999	26.61
Total votes		214,198	100.00
Lakas hold			

== See also ==
- Legislative districts of Capiz

== Notes ==
House of Representatives of the Philippines
Preceded by Leyte's 1st congressional district	Home district of the speaker of the House of Representatives; March 8, 1962 – February 2, 1967 (April 1, 1971 – September 23, 1972)	Succeeded by Batangas's 3rd congressional district
Preceded by Batangas's 3rd congressional district	Home district of the speaker of the House of Representatives; March 8, 1962 – February 2, 1967 (April 1, 1971 – September 23, 1972)	Succeeded by Region IV's at-large parliamentary district (as the home district of the speaker of the Batasang Pambansa)
