= Sapian =

Municipality in Capiz, Philippines

- Municipality
- Municipality of Sapian
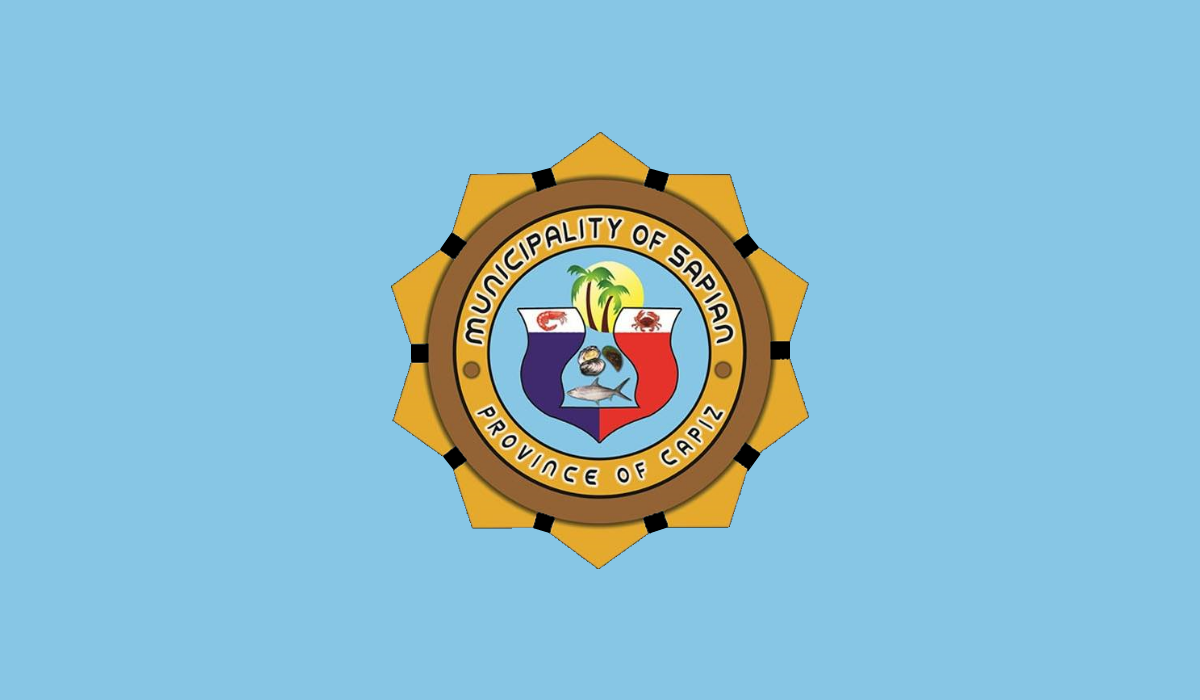
- Flag

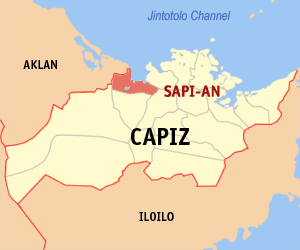
- Map of Capiz with Sapian highlighted
- Interactive map of Sapian
- Location within the Philippines
- Coordinates: 11°29′38″N 122°36′17″E
- Country: Philippines
- Region: Western Visayas
- Province: Capiz
- District: 2nd district
- Barangays: 10 (see Barangays)

Government
  - Type: Sangguniang Bayan
  - Mayor: Jose O. Villanueva (1Capiz)
  - Vice Mayor: Ralph C. Odrunia (1Capiz)
  - Representative: Jane T. Castro (Lakas)
  - Municipal Council: Members: Anna Liessa G. Baguio; Zoe Maria Felipe A. Herrera; Ponciano L. Banjao, Jr.; Gina O. Yelo; Gee Anne Balue T. Tupaz; Joseph Conrad S. Honrado; John Manrick H. Figueroa; Santi N. Bayog
  - Electorate: 19,067 voters (2025)

Area
  - Total: 105.24 km^{2} (40.63 sq mi)
- Elevation: 34 m (112 ft)
- Highest elevation: 390 m (1,280 ft)
- Lowest elevation: 0 m (0 ft)

Population (2024 census)
  - Total: 27,377
  - Density: 260.14/km^{2} (673.76/sq mi)
  - Households: 6,646

Economy
  - Income class: 3rd municipal income class
  - Poverty incidence: 21.68% (2023)
  - Revenue: ₱ 144.2 million (2024)
  - Assets: ₱ 433.6 million (2024)
  - Expenditure: ₱ 36.24 million (2024)
  - Liabilities: ₱ 101.4 million (2024)

Service provider
  - Electricity: Capiz Electric Cooperative (CAPELCO)
- Time zone: UTC+8 (PST)
- ZIP code: 5806
- PSGC: 061915000
- IDD : area code: +63 (0)36
- Native languages: Capisnon; Hiligaynon; Tagalog
- Website: www.sapian.gov.ph

Sapian, officially the Municipality of Sapian (Capiznon/Hiligaynon: Banwa sang Sapian; Aklanon: Banwa it Sapian; Tagalog: Bayan ng Sapian), and sometimes spelled Sapi-an, is a municipality in the province of Capiz, Philippines. According to the 2024 census, it has a population of 27,377 people.

== Geography ==
Sapian is 27 kilometres (17 mi) from Roxas City, the provincial capital.

Sapian Bay which is situated in the northern part of the municipality is geographically joined with Capiz Bay. The 30 km^{2} Sapian and Capiz shallow sea bays has extensive intertidal mudflats, sandy beaches, mangrove swamps, estuaries of several small rivers, and associated coastal lagoons and marshes. Sapian Bay which opens up to the Sibuyan Sea is a source of livelihood for many Sapianons. Marine produce from Sapian Bay include green mussels, oysters, lobsters, different species of fish, and clams. Many lands near seawater were developed into fishponds that produce milkfish, prawns, and crabs.

Another source of livelihood is agriculture. Carpets of rice fields, trees and flowers can be seen as one travels through Sapian along the national road which connect Roxas City to Iloilo and Aklan. The ricefield along the national road are slowly disappearing to give way to housing developments. Sapian's main agricultural produce are rice and coconuts.

=== Barangays ===
Sapian is politically subdivided into 10 barangays. Each barangay consists of puroks and some have sitios.

- Agsilab
- Agtatacay Norte
- Agtatacay Sur
- Bilao
- Damayan
- Dapdapan
- Lonoy
- Majanlud
- Maninang
- Poblacion

=== Climate ===
Climate data for Sapian, Capiz
Month	Jan	Feb	Mar	Apr	May	Jun	Jul	Aug	Sep	Oct	Nov	Dec	Year
Mean daily maximum °C (°F)	27 (81)	28 (82)	29 (84)	31 (88)	32 (90)	31 (88)	30 (86)	30 (86)	29 (84)	29 (84)	29 (84)	27 (81)	29 (85)
Mean daily minimum °C (°F)	23 (73)	23 (73)	23 (73)	24 (75)	25 (77)	25 (77)	24 (75)	24 (75)	24 (75)	24 (75)	24 (75)	23 (73)	24 (75)
Average precipitation mm (inches)	61 (2.4)	39 (1.5)	46 (1.8)	48 (1.9)	90 (3.5)	144 (5.7)	152 (6.0)	145 (5.7)	163 (6.4)	160 (6.3)	120 (4.7)	90 (3.5)	1,258 (49.4)
Average rainy days	12.3	9.0	9.9	10.0	18.5	25.0	27.4	26.0	25.9	24.9	17.9	14.2	221
Source: Meteoblue

== Demographics ==
Population census of Sapian
Year	Pop.	±% p.a.
1903	3,185	—
1918	4,398	+2.17%
1939	7,391	+2.50%
1948	8,218	+1.19%
1960	11,638	+2.94%
1970	14,171	+1.99%
1975	17,395	+4.20%
1980	18,753	+1.51%
1990	22,011	+1.62%
1995	22,534	+0.44%
2000	22,912	+0.36%
2007	23,552	+0.38%
2010	24,779	+1.87%
2015	25,821	+0.79%
2020	26,697	+0.70%
2024	27,377	+0.61%
Source: Philippine Statistics Authority

In the 2024 census, the population of Sapian was 27,377 people, with a density of 260 inhabitants per square kilometre or 670 inhabitants per square mile.

=== Language ===
Capiznon and Hiligaynon are the main languages of Sapian, but Aklanon is also spoken and understood due to its proximity to Aklan.

== The town center ==
In the center of town (or poblacion) is a well-maintained park known simply as the plaza. It is the venue of many celebrations especially during the town fiesta. The people of Sapian show lavish cultural and religious celebrations from July 22 to 26 each year in honour of their patron saint Santa Ana.

A few meters away from the plaza is the municipal hall which holds local government offices. Next to it is the barangay hall and health clinic. Nearby is Sapian Elementary School, two big churches, the Catholic Church and the Aglipayan Church, and the public market.

About one kilometre from the town center is Sapian National High School and Capiz State University (CAPSU) Sapian Campus.

== Economy ==
Poverty incidence of Sapian (%)

Source: Philippine Statistics Authority

== Education ==
The Sapian Schools District Office governs all educational institutions within the municipality. It oversees the management and operations of all private and public, from primary to secondary schools.

Primary and elementary schools

- Agkaningay Primary School
- Agsilab Elementary School
- Agtatacay Norte Elementary School
- Agtatacay Sur Elementary School
- Angkin Elementary School
- Apogan Primary School
- Bangkal Elementary School
- Benlit Elementary School
- Bulon Primary School
- Camansi Primary School
- Culasi Elementary School
- Damayan Elementary School
- Dapdapan Elementary School
- Guibongan Primary School
- Lonoy Elementary School
- Majanlud Elementary School
- Maninang Elementary School
- Marubrob MARUBROB Primary School
- Sapian Elementary School
- St. Anne School
- Telesforo Aperocho Elementary School
- Wenceslao Onas Elementary School

Secondary schools

- Bilao Integrated School
- Ishmael B. Orillos National High School
- Sapian National High School

Higher educational institution

- Capiz State University
