= Sigma, Capiz =

Municipality in Capiz, Philippines

Sigma
- Municipality
- Municipality of Sigma
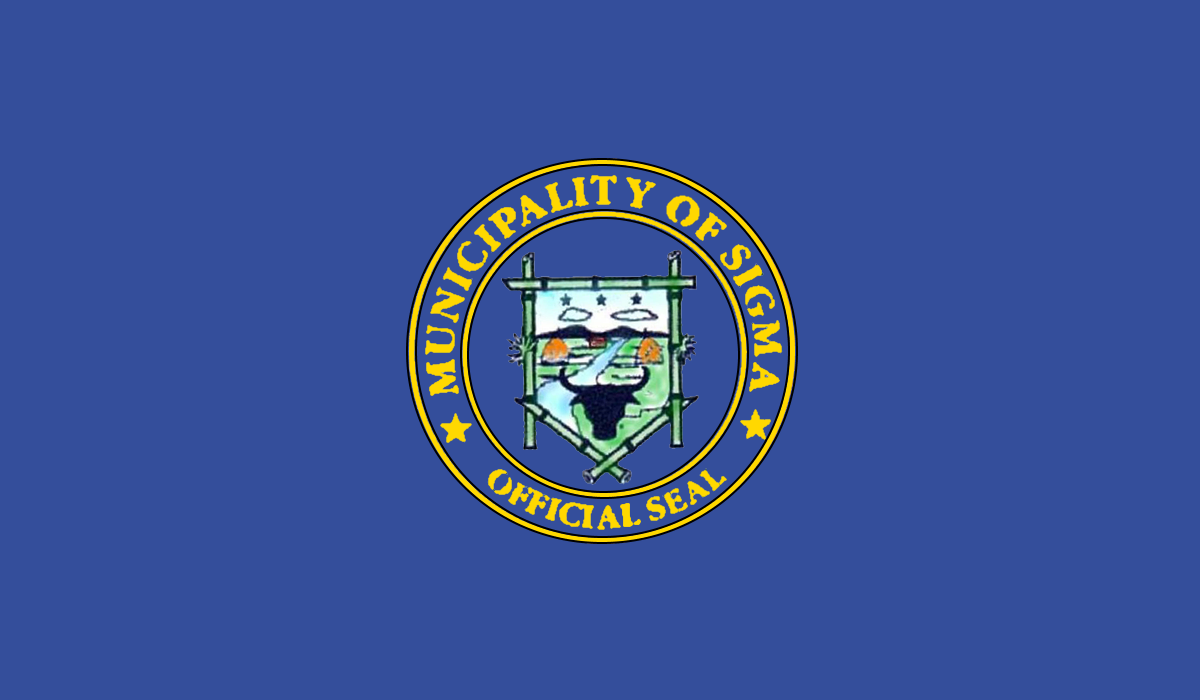
- Flag
- Nickname: The Heart of Capiz
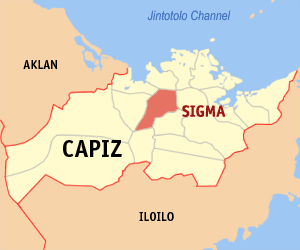
- Map of Capiz with Sigma highlighted
- Interactive map of Sigma
- Location within the Philippines
- Coordinates: 11°25′17″N 122°39′58″E
- Country: Philippines
- Region: Western Visayas
- Province: Capiz
- District: 2nd district
- Barangays: 21 (see Barangays)

Government
  - Type: Sangguniang Bayan
  - Mayor: Dante Rizal A. Eslabon (1Capiz)
  - Vice Mayor: Stephen F. Alayon (PDP)
  - Representative: Jane T. Castro (Lakas)
  - Municipal Council: Members: Norman T. Marcelino; Christopher L. Alayon; Albert B. Santiago; Thomas B. Lagulay; Esperidion C. Pelaez; Dan Justin T. Eslabon; Rolly D. Miguel; Fernando B. Capapas
  - Electorate: 23,201 voters (2025)

Area
  - Total: 101.71 km^{2} (39.27 sq mi)
- Elevation: 41 m (135 ft)
- Highest elevation: 401 m (1,316 ft)
- Lowest elevation: 0 m (0 ft)

Population (2024 census)
  - Total: 32,628
  - Density: 320.79/km^{2} (830.85/sq mi)
  - Households: 8,208

Economy
  - Income class: 3rd municipal income class
  - Poverty incidence: 13.61% (2023)
  - Revenue: ₱ 164.5 million (2024)
  - Assets: ₱ 284 million (2024)
  - Expenditure: ₱ 148.8 million (2024)
  - Liabilities: ₱ 34.59 million (2024)

Service provider
  - Electricity: Capiz Electric Cooperative (CAPELCO)
- Time zone: UTC+8 (PST)
- ZIP code: 5816
- PSGC: 061916000
- IDD : area code: +63 (0)36
- Native languages: Capisnon; Hiligaynon; Tagalog

Sigma, officially the Municipality of Sigma (Capiznon/Hiligaynon: Banwa sang Sigma; Tagalog: Bayan ng Sigma), is a municipality in the province of Capiz, Philippines. According to the 2024 census, it has a population of 32,628 people.

== Etymology ==
The town was named after the legendary Datu Sikma, which was transcribed as Sigma by the Spanish colonizers.

== Geography ==
Sigma is 28 kilometres (17 mi) from Roxas City, the provincial capital of Capiz.

=== Barangays ===
Sigma is politically subdivided into 21 barangays. Each barangay consists of puroks and some have sitios.

- Acbo
- Amaga
- Balucuan
- Bangonbangon
- Capuyhan
- Cogon
- Dayhagon
- Guintas
- Malapad Cogon
- Mangoso
- Mansacul
- Matangcong
- Matinabus
- Mianay
- Oyong
- Pagbunitan
- Parian
- Pinamalatican
- Poblacion Norte
- Poblacion Sur
- Tawog

=== Climate ===
Climate data for Sigma, Capiz
Month	Jan	Feb	Mar	Apr	May	Jun	Jul	Aug	Sep	Oct	Nov	Dec	Year
Mean daily maximum °C (°F)	27 (81)	28 (82)	29 (84)	31 (88)	32 (90)	31 (88)	30 (86)	30 (86)	29 (84)	29 (84)	29 (84)	27 (81)	29 (85)
Mean daily minimum °C (°F)	23 (73)	23 (73)	23 (73)	24 (75)	25 (77)	25 (77)	24 (75)	24 (75)	24 (75)	24 (75)	24 (75)	23 (73)	24 (75)
Average precipitation mm (inches)	61 (2.4)	39 (1.5)	46 (1.8)	48 (1.9)	90 (3.5)	144 (5.7)	152 (6.0)	145 (5.7)	163 (6.4)	160 (6.3)	120 (4.7)	90 (3.5)	1,258 (49.4)
Average rainy days	12.3	9.0	9.9	10.0	18.5	25.0	27.4	26.0	25.9	24.9	17.9	14.2	221
Source: Meteoblue

== Demographics ==
Population census of Sigma
Year	Pop.	±% p.a.
1903	5,205	—
1918	8,303	+3.16%
1939	10,628	+1.18%
1948	10,898	+0.28%
1960	12,649	+1.25%
1970	15,911	+2.32%
1975	18,536	+3.11%
1980	20,043	+1.58%
1990	25,089	+2.27%
1995	25,801	+0.53%
2000	27,366	+1.27%
2007	28,709	+0.66%
2010	29,138	+0.54%
2015	30,134	+0.64%
2020	31,688	+1.06%
2024	32,628	+0.70%
Source: Philippine Statistics Authority

In the 2024 census, the population of Sigma was 32,628 people, with a density of 320 inhabitants per square kilometre or 830 inhabitants per square mile.

== Economy ==
Poverty incidence of Sigma (%)

Source: Philippine Statistics Authority

== Education ==
The Sigma Schools District Office governs all educational institutions within the municipality. It oversees the management and operations of all private and public, from primary to secondary schools.

Primary and elementary schools

- Acbo Elementary School
- Amaga Elementary School
- Atty. Santiago Abella Vito Elementary School
- Balogo Primary School
- Cogon Elementary School
- Dayhagon Elementary School
- Fructousa A. de Romero Elementary School
- Jose Reyes Jarencio Elementary School
- Juan Aldea Elementary School
- Loreto A. Balgos Elementary School
- Maestro J. Reyes Elementary School
- Mangoso Elementary School
- Margarita Soriano Elementary School
- Matinabus Elementary School
- Pagbunitan Elementary School
- Pascual Gregore Elementary School
- Ryza Maria Montessori School
- San Juan Bautista Parochial School
- Sigma Central Elementary School
- Simeon Bidiones Elementary School
- Sinandigan Elementary School
- Tawog Primary School

Secondary schools

- Calixto Loyola Sr. Integrated School
- Eleodoro J. Ponsaran Integrated School
- Mianay National High School
- Vicente Andaya Sr. National High School

Higher educational institution

- Capiz State University
