= Capiz's at-large congressional district =

Congressional district of the Philippines

Capiz's at-large congressional district refers to the provincewide electoral district that was used to elect members of Philippine national legislatures in Capiz before 1987.

Capiz first elected its representatives at-large in the 1943 Philippine legislative election for a seat in the National Assembly of the Second Philippine Republic. Before 1943, the province which also included the territories of present-day Aklan and Romblon (until 1919) was represented in the national legislatures through its first, second and third districts. The province was also earlier represented in the Malolos Congress of the First Philippine Republic in 1898 by appointed delegates residing in Luzon.

The three districts were restored in Capiz ahead of the 1941 Philippine House of Representatives elections whose elected representatives only began to serve following the dissolution of the Second Republic and the restoration of the Philippine Commonwealth in 1945. The province lost its third district following the separation of Aklan in 1956. An at-large district would not be used in the province again until the 1984 Philippine parliamentary election for two seats in the Batasang Pambansa. It became obsolete following the 1987 reapportionment under a new constitution that restored Capiz's two congressional districts.

== Representation history ==
#	Term of office		National Assembly	Seat A				Seat B				Seat C			
#	Start	End	National Assembly	Image	Member	Party	Electoral history	Image	Member	Party	Electoral history	Image	Member	Party	Electoral history
=== Capiz's at-large district for the Malolos Congress ===
District created June 18, 1898.
–	September 15, 1898	March 23, 1901	1st		Mariano Bacani	Nonpartisan	Appointed.		Juan Baltazar	Nonpartisan	Appointed.		Miguel Zaragoza	Nonpartisan	Appointed.
#	Term of office		National Assembly	Seat A				Seat B				Seats eliminated			
#	Start	End	National Assembly	Image	Member	Party	Electoral history	Image	Member	Party	Electoral history	Seats eliminated			
=== Capiz's at-large district for the National Assembly (Second Philippine Republic) ===												Seats eliminated			
District re-created September 7, 1943.												Seats eliminated			
–	September 25, 1943	February 2, 1944	1st		Eduardo Abalo	KALIBAPI	Elected in 1943.		Alfredo V. Jacinto	KALIBAPI	Appointed as an ex officio member.	Seats eliminated			
District dissolved into Capiz's 1st, 2nd and 3rd districts.												Seats eliminated			
#	Term of office		Batasang Pambansa	Seat A				Seat B				Seats eliminated			
#	Start	End	Batasang Pambansa	Image	Member	Party	Electoral history	Image	Member	Party	Electoral history	Seats eliminated			
=== Capiz's at-large district for the Regular Batasang Pambansa ===												Seats eliminated			
District re-created February 1, 1984.												Seats eliminated			
–	July 23, 1984	March 25, 1986	2nd		Enrique M. Belo	Independent	Elected in 1984.		Charles B. Escolin	KBL	Elected in 1984.	Seats eliminated			
District dissolved into Capiz's 1st and 2nd districts.												Seats eliminated			

== See also ==
- Legislative districts of Capiz
