= Jamindan =

Municipality in Capiz, Philippines

- Municipality
- Municipality of Jamindan
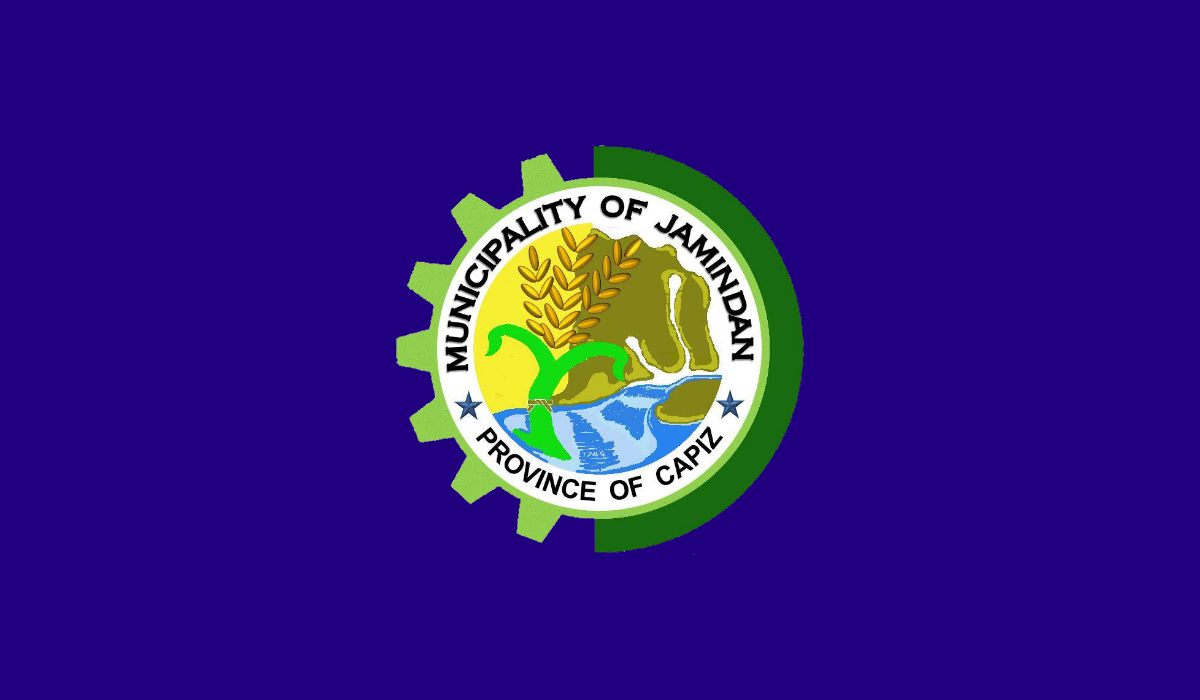
- Flag

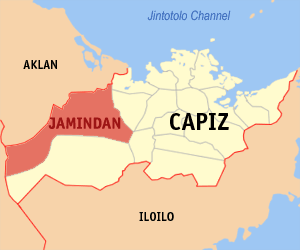
- Map of Capiz with Jamindan highlighted
- Interactive map of Jamindan
- Location within the Philippines
- Coordinates: 11°24′34″N 122°30′37″E
- Country: Philippines
- Region: Western Visayas
- Province: Capiz
- District: 2nd district
- Barangays: 30 (see Barangays)

Government
  - Type: Sangguniang Bayan
  - Mayor: Donnah T. Valdemar (1Capiz)
  - Vice Mayor: Lemuel V. Vestidas (1Capiz)
  - Representative: Jane T. Castro (Lakas)
  - Municipal Council: Members: Reggie V. Villasis; Benedicto G. Layson; J.Tevens V. Vista; Jonathan R. Guillermo; Mia V. Destura; Henry V. Vili; Nilda B. Valaquio; Jacqueline A. Laurino
  - Electorate: 25,731 voters (2025)

Area
  - Total: 412.03 km^{2} (159.09 sq mi)
- Highest elevation (Mount Nangtud): 2,074 m (6,804 ft)

Population (2024 census)
  - Total: 40,472
  - Density: 98.226/km^{2} (254.40/sq mi)
  - Households: 9,778

Economy
  - Income class: 1st municipal income class
  - Poverty incidence: 21.6% (2023)
  - Revenue: ₱ 252.3 million (2024)
  - Assets: ₱ 472.7 million (2024)
  - Expenditure: ₱ 103.8 million (2024)
  - Liabilities: ₱ 100 million (2024)

Service provider
  - Electricity: Capiz Electric Cooperative (CAPELCO)
- Time zone: UTC+8 (PST)
- ZIP code: 5808
- PSGC: 061906000
- IDD : area code: +63 (0)36
- Native languages: Karay-a; Capisnon; Hiligaynon; Tagalog

Jamindan, officially the Municipality of Jamindan (Capiznon/Hiligaynon: Banwa sang Jamindan; Aklanon: Banwa it Jamindan; Kinaray-a: Banwa kang Jamindan; Tagalog: Bayan ng Jamindan), is a municipality in the province of Capiz, Philippines. According to the 2024 census, it has a population of 40,472 people.

== Geography ==
It is located on the western part of the province and is 48 kilometres (30 mi) from Roxas City.

=== Barangays ===
Jamindan is politically subdivided into 30 barangays.

- Agambulong
- Agbun-od
- Agcagay
- Aglibacao
- Agloloway
- Bayebaye
- Caridad
- Esperanza
- Fe
- Ganzon
- Guintas
- Igang
- Jaena Norte
- Jaena Sur
- Jagnaya
- Lapaz
- Linambasan
- Lucero
- Maantol
- Masgrau
- Milan
- Molet
- Pangabat
- Pangabuan
- Pasol-o
- Poblacion
- San Jose
- San Juan
- San Vicente
- Santo Rosario

=== Climate ===
Climate data for Jamindan, Capiz
Month	Jan	Feb	Mar	Apr	May	Jun	Jul	Aug	Sep	Oct	Nov	Dec	Year
Mean daily maximum °C (°F)	28 (82)	30 (86)	31 (88)	32 (90)	32 (90)	30 (86)	29 (84)	29 (84)	29 (84)	29 (84)	29 (84)	28 (82)	30 (85)
Mean daily minimum °C (°F)	22 (72)	22 (72)	22 (72)	23 (73)	25 (77)	25 (77)	25 (77)	25 (77)	25 (77)	24 (75)	23 (73)	23 (73)	24 (75)
Average precipitation mm (inches)	64 (2.5)	44 (1.7)	58 (2.3)	83 (3.3)	204 (8.0)	304 (12.0)	334 (13.1)	291 (11.5)	310 (12.2)	281 (11.1)	172 (6.8)	97 (3.8)	2,242 (88.3)
Average rainy days	12.5	8.9	11.3	14.1	24.2	28.0	29.6	28.2	28.1	28.1	20.2	15.2	248.4
Source: Meteoblue

== Demographics ==
Population census of Jamindan
Year	Pop.	±% p.a.
1903	6,102	—
1918	9,117	+2.71%
1939	13,582	+1.92%
1948	13,769	+0.15%
1960	16,090	+1.31%
1970	20,483	+2.44%
1975	23,893	+3.14%
1980	25,652	+1.43%
1990	27,896	+0.84%
1995	34,022	+3.79%
2000	33,966	−0.04%
2007	34,831	+0.35%
2010	35,002	+0.18%
2015	36,677	+0.89%
2020	38,670	+1.12%
2024	40,472	+1.10%
Source: Philippine Statistics Authority

In the 2024 census, the population of Jamindan was 40,472 people, with a density of 98 inhabitants per square kilometre or 250 inhabitants per square mile.

== Economy ==
Poverty incidence of Jamindan (%)

Source: Philippine Statistics Authority

== Education ==
The Jamindan Schools District Office governs all educational institutions within the municipality. It oversees the management and operations of all private and public, from primary to secondary schools.

Primary and elementary schools

- Agbun-od Elementary School
- Agcagay Elementary School
- Aglibacao Primary School
- Agloloway Elementary School
- Agtupgop Elementary School
- Camp Jamindan Elementary School
- Caridad Primary School
- Damiana M. Ongkiko Elementary School
- Fe Primary School
- Francisco C. Vacaro Elementary School
- Guintas Elementary School
- Igang Primary School
- Jaena Norte Elementary School
- Jaena Sur Primary School
- Jagnaya Elementary School
- Jamindan Elementary School
- La Paz Primary School
- Linambasan Elementary School
- Lucero Elementary School
- Maantol Elementary School
- Masnang Primary School
- Milan Elementary School
- North Lucero Primary School
- Pangabat Elementary School
- Pasol-o Primary School
- San Jose Elementary School
- San Sebastian Parochial School
- San Vicente Elementary School
- Sto. Rosario Primary School
- Ubog Elementary School

Secondary schools

- Jagnaya National High School
- Jamindan National High School
- Lucero National High School
- Macario Delfin Bermejo National High School
- Manuel Ganzon Advincula Integrated School
