= O, Capiz =

Provincial anthem of Capiz

English: Capiz Hymn
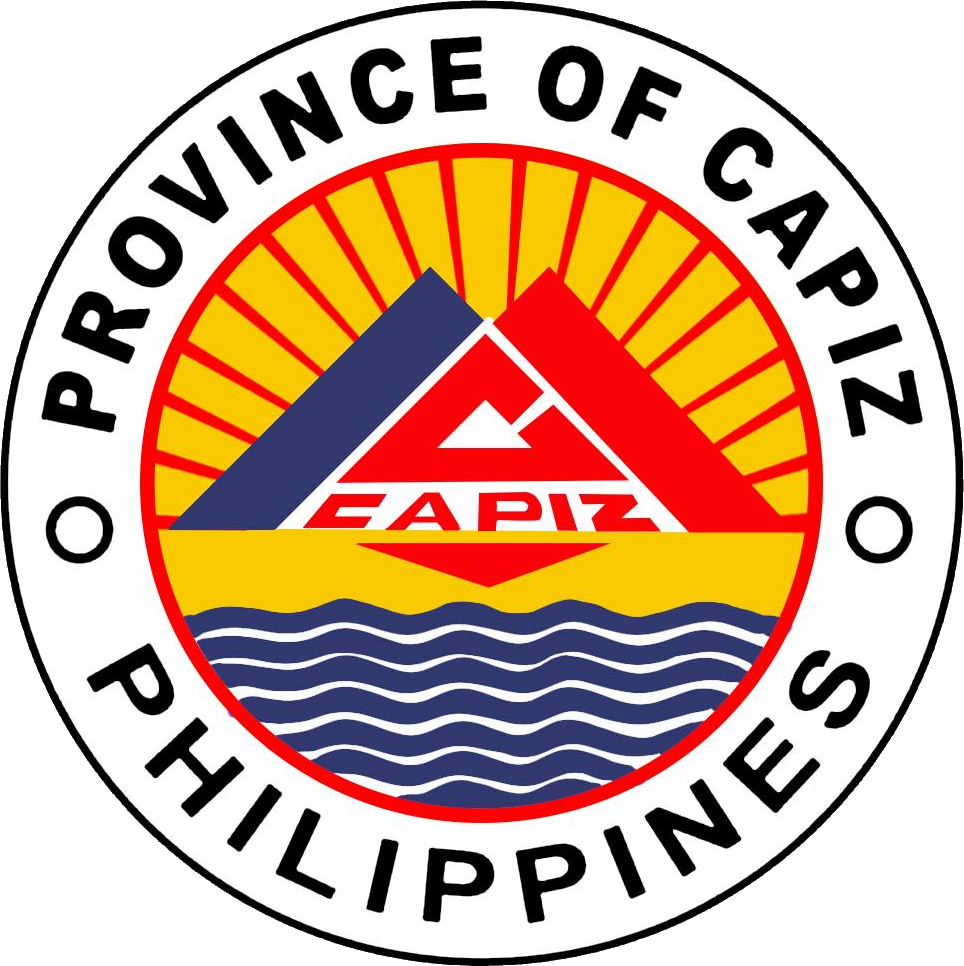
- Provincial anthem of Capiz
- Lyrics: Charmaine O. Guartero, 2006
- Music: Charmaine O. Guartero, 2006
- Adopted: June 23, 2006

"O, Capiz", also known as the Capiz Hymn, is the official provincial anthem of the province of Capiz in the Philippines.

== History ==
"O, Capiz" was written by Charmaine O. Guartero, a high school music teacher at Filamer Christian University, besting 24 other songs entered in a province-sponsored competition for the selection of a provincial hymn. It was first performed on April 21, 2006 at the Hall of Governors in Roxas City, where Guartero was also awarded ₱20,000, a plaque and a certificate by Governor Vicente Bermejo.

The hymn was adopted on June 23, 2006 by an ordinance of the Sangguniang Panlalawigan of Capiz and performed for the first time at the charter anniversary of the province. The current arrangement, meanwhile, was unveiled on June 25, 2007. Bermejo later noted that in the Capizeños' quest for development, "we need a melody that will inspire us and forge our efforts together to achieve our dream for a better Capiz", describing "O, Capiz" as a unique expression of what the true Capiz is and what Capizeños really are.

The official video of "O, Capiz" is available on YouTube and cassette and CD copies of the hymn are being distributed to schools throughout the province.

== Lyrics ==
Capiznon

O, Capiz duog nga hamili
Dunang manggad sang Dios pinili.
Kadagatan mo kag kabukiran.
Pagatatapon imong kabugana-an.

Capiz matahum nga ngalan.
Sa tagui-pusuon ikaw mapahamtang.
Dumulu-ong ka, o Capizeño man ang kagayun.
Sa gihapon, mahamutan.

Koro:
O, Capiz, Capiz
Bisan diin kami padulong
O, Capiz, Capiz
Imo ngalan pagadal-on

Capiz, probinsiya nga pinasahi.
Bilidhon ang mga palanubli-on
Ipadayon, palig-unon, itib-ong Capiznon.
Tanan, magahugpong.

Koro

Imo ngalan pagadal-on

Literal Filipino translation

O, Capiz, tanging lugar
Pinagpala ng likas na kagandahan.
Ang iyong dagat at bundok
Nagdadala ng kaunlaran

Capiz, ngalang marangal
Sa aking puso ka'y maninirahan
Tinanggap ka namin, mga banyaga
Na laging may galak.

Koro:
O, Capiz, Capiz
Kahit saan dinadala ka!
O, Capiz, Capiz
Dala namin ang ngalan mo!

Capiz, ika'y naiibang probinsiya!
Pamana mo'y mahalaga na mahalaga!
Ipatuloy, himuki't itaas ang diwang Capiznon!
Tayo'y magkaisa.

Koro

Dala namin ang ngalan mo!

Literal English translation

O, Capiz, such a precious site!
Blessed by God with wealth.
Your seas and mountains.
Bring prosperity to all.

Capiz, a beautiful name.
In my heart you shall stay.
To visitors, we Capizeños gracefully welcome you.
Always filled with delight.

Chorus:
O, Capiz, Capiz
Everywhere we remember you
O, Capiz, Capiz
Your name carries on!

Capiz, you special province
Precious is your legacy!
Continue, encourage, lift the Capiznon spirit!
Everyone, together.

Chorus

Your name carries on!
