= Tapaz =

Municipality in Capiz, Philippines

- Municipality
- Municipality of Tapaz
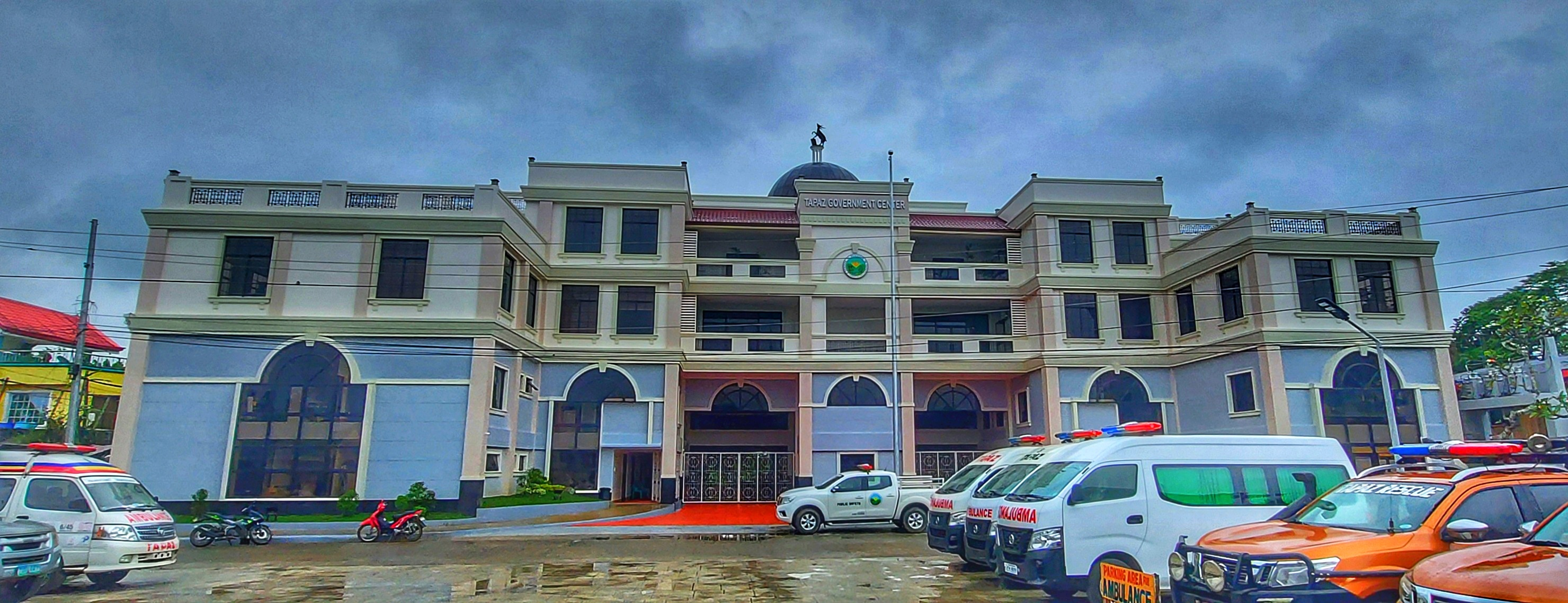
- Tapaz Government Center

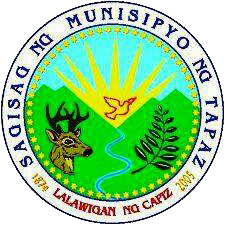
- Flag Seal
- Motto: Bakas Tapaz
- Anthem: "Tapaz, Banwang Nalulutan"
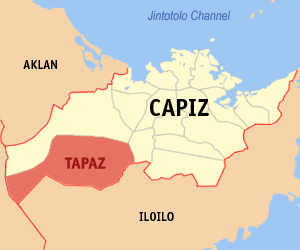
- Map of Capiz with Tapaz highlighted
- Interactive map of Tapaz
- Location within the Philippines
- Coordinates: 11°15′44″N 122°32′13″E
- Country: Philippines
- Region: Western Visayas
- Province: Capiz
- District: 2nd district
- Barangays: 58 (see Barangays)

Government
  - Type: Sangguniang Bayan
  - Mayor: Rex Dante L. Palomar (Lakas)
  - Vice Mayor: Roberto O. Palomar (PDP)
  - Representative: Jane T. Castro (Lakas)
  - Municipal Council: Members: Marlon C. Perez; Hernalyn P. Pastrana; Julia P. Cerdon; Milagros R. Palomar; Felino F. Farenas; Karen A. Palomar; Nicholas G. Gevero; Liezel G. Aldea; Hila S. Gafate (Ex-Oficio Member (ABC President)); Peter Frank Gallenero (Ex-Oficio Member (SK Federation President)); Bernie C. Tupaz (Ex-Officio Member (Indigenous Peoples Mandatory Representative))
  - Electorate: 37,067 voters (2025)

Area
  - Total: 517.18 km^{2} (199.68 sq mi)
- Elevation: 259 m (850 ft)
- Highest elevation: 2,069 m (6,788 ft)
  - Rank: 0

Population (2024 census)
  - Total: 57,684
  - Density: 111.54/km^{2} (288.88/sq mi)
  - Households: 13,473
- Demonym: Tapaznon

Economy
  - Income class: 1st municipal income class
  - Poverty incidence: 23.21% (2023)
  - Revenue: ₱ 331.1 million (2024)
  - Assets: ₱ 783.3 million (2024)
  - Expenditure: ₱ 174.5 million (2024)
  - Liabilities: ₱ 385 million (2024)

Service provider
  - Electricity: Capiz Electric Cooperative (CAPELCO)
- Time zone: UTC+8 (PST)
- ZIP code: 5814
- PSGC: 061917000
- IDD : area code: +63 (0)36
- Native languages: Sulod; Karay-a; Capisnon; Hiligaynon; Tagalog
- Website: www.tapaz.gov.ph

Tapaz, officially the Municipality of Tapaz (Capiznon: Banwa sang Tapaz; Hiligaynon: Banwa sang Tapaz; Aklan: Banwa it Tapaz; Kinaray-a: Banwa kang Tapaz/Banwa ka Tapaz; Tagalog: Bayan ng Tapaz), is a municipality in the province of Capiz, Philippines. According to the 2024 census, it has a population of 57,684 people.

== History ==
The first people who arrived and settled in what is now Tapaz are the Panay-Bukidnon people who speak the indigenous Ligbok language.

When the Spanish arrived in Panay, they established Dumalag. Eventually, Tapaz was founded in 1835 but it continued being a part of Dumalag for many years. In 1862 and 1863 two letters were made to declare parish under the patronage of St. Jerome. Both were signed by Governor General Lemery, but they were never executed. Finally, in 1874, Tapaz was declared an independent parish by Jaro Bishop Mariano Cuartero.

In 2016, the Ligbok language of the Panay-Bukidnon of Tapaz was confirmed to be dying out. This triggered a massive conservation program for the language and the epic chant spoken by the Panay-Bukidnon.

== Geography ==
Tapaz lies within the latitude 11° 09’ to 11° 09’ 42" and the longitude of 121° 11’ to 122° 34’ 45". It is 55 kilometres (34 mi) from Roxas City.

Marugo Lake in Barangay San Antonio is a popular tourist destination.

=== Climate ===
Climate data for Tapaz, Capiz
Month	Jan	Feb	Mar	Apr	May	Jun	Jul	Aug	Sep	Oct	Nov	Dec	Year
Mean daily maximum °C (°F)	28 (82)	29 (84)	31 (88)	32 (90)	32 (90)	30 (86)	29 (84)	29 (84)	29 (84)	29 (84)	29 (84)	28 (82)	30 (85)
Mean daily minimum °C (°F)	22 (72)	22 (72)	22 (72)	23 (73)	25 (77)	25 (77)	25 (77)	25 (77)	25 (77)	24 (75)	23 (73)	23 (73)	24 (75)
Average precipitation mm (inches)	64 (2.5)	44 (1.7)	58 (2.3)	83 (3.3)	204 (8.0)	304 (12.0)	334 (13.1)	291 (11.5)	310 (12.2)	281 (11.1)	172 (6.8)	97 (3.8)	2,242 (88.3)
Average rainy days	12.5	8.9	11.3	14.1	24.2	28.0	29.6	28.2	28.1	28.1	20.2	15.2	248.4
Source: Meteoblue (modeled/calculated data, not measured locally)

=== Barangays ===
Tapaz is politically subdivided into 58 barangays. However, there are boundaries issues with neighboring municipalities of Jamindan, Capiz and Libacao, Aklan. The Sitio Maytaraw which is bordered to Calinog, Iloilo is occupied by Libacao, Aklan but within the territory of Tapaz, while the four Barangays, the Brgy Hilwan, Brgy Rizal Sur, Brgy Rizal Norte, and Brgy Maliao are within the Territorial Jurisdiction of Jamindan. Each barangay consists of puroks and some have sitios.

There are 36 lowlands barangays and the rest of the 22 are upland barangays.

- Abangay
- Acuña
- Agcococ
- Aglinab
- Aglupacan
- Agpalali
- Apero
- Artuz
- Bag-Ong Barrio
- Bato-bato
- Buri
- Camburanan
- Candelaria
- Carida
- Cristina
- Da-an Banwa
- Da-an Norte
- Da-an Sur
- Garcia
- Gebio-an
- Hilwan
- Initan
- Katipunan
- Lagdungan
- Lahug
- Libertad
- Mabini
- Maliao
- Malitbog
- Minan
- Nayawan
- Poblacion
- Rizal Norte
- Rizal Sur
- Roosevelt
- Roxas
- Salong
- San Antonio
- San Francisco
- San Jose
- San Julian
- San Miguel Ilawod
- San Miguel Ilaya
- San Nicolas
- San Pedro
- San Roque
- San Vicente
- Santa Ana
- Santa Petronila
- Senonod
- Siya
- Switch
- Tabon
- Tacayan
- Taft
- Taganghin
- Taslan
- Wright

== Demographics ==
Population census of Tapaz
Year	Pop.	±% p.a.
1903	3,741	—
1918	11,242	+7.61%
1939	17,047	+2.00%
1948	16,376	−0.45%
1960	21,178	+2.17%
1970	26,482	+2.26%
1975	30,589	+2.93%
1980	35,129	+2.81%
1990	40,942	+1.54%
1995	40,809	−0.06%
2000	44,085	+1.67%
2007	47,059	+0.90%
2010	48,051	+0.76%
2015	51,313	+1.26%
2020	54,423	+1.25%
2024	57,684	+1.41%
Source: Philippine Statistics Authority

In the 2024 census, the population of Tapaz was 57,684 people, with a density of 110 inhabitants per square kilometre or 280 inhabitants per square mile.

The natives of Tapaz are mixture of several ethnic groups as the Malays, Spaniards, Indonesians, and the Aetas or Negritos who are the aborigines of Panay. In the recent years the residents are a distinct group as the "Baludnons" those in the lowlands and "Bukidnons" those in the uplands.

There is a small community of indigenous Panay-Bukidnon in Barangay Tacayan. The community is home to Feliza, a binukot who has expertise in chanting the Suguidanon, one of the most significant epic chants of the Western Visayas region. Feliza is the last known person who can speak the Ligbok language in her community, making her the last bastion for the thousand-year old language in Tapaz. Her death would translate to the death of the language in Tapaz itself and the Suguidanon epic chant as well. Also, Feliza has traditional tattoos on her skin which were inscribed when she was chosen as a binukot. In 2016, after reports came out on the dying Ligbok language and suguidanon epic chant, the government began documenting the language and epic chant and teaching the language to younger generations of Panay-Bukidnon in Tapaz.

=== Religion ===
As a Catholic Dominant Municipality. Tapaz has two parishes and three mission stations and many churches.

Parishes:

- St. Jerome Parish (Poblacion, Tapaz)
- St. Nicholas of Myra Parish (San Nicolas, Tapaz)

Mission Stations:

- St. Andre Besette Mission Station (Taft, Tapaz)
- St. Juan Diego Mission Station (Cristina, Tapaz)
- St. Julian of Cuenca Mission Station (San Julian, Tapaz)

== Economy ==
Poverty incidence of Tapaz

Source: Philippine Statistics Authority

== Healthcare ==
Hospital in Tapaz:

- Tapaz District Hospital

== Culture ==
The festivals are the Patabang Festival in September honoring Patron Saint Jerome, and Sirinadya Festival in January honoring Sr. Santo Niño. Other local festival is Tinuom Festival in Barangay San Nicolas celebrated in the Month of December honoring Patron Saint Nicholas of Myra.

== Education ==
There are two schools district offices which govern all educational institutions within the municipality. They oversee the management and operations of all private and public, from primary to secondary schools. These are the:

- Tapaz East Schools District
- Tapaz West Schools District

Primary and elementary schools

- Abangay Elementary School
- Acuña Elementary School
- Agcococ Elementary School
- Aglinab Elementary School
- Agpalali Elementary School
- Apero Elementary School
- Arisgal Elementary School
- Artuz Elementary School
- Bagong Barrio Elementary School
- Bato-bato Primary School
- Buri Primary School
- Camburanan Elementary School
- Candelaria Elementary School
- Cristina Elementary School
- Daan Banwa Elementary School
- Daan Norte Elementary School
- Daan Sur Elementary School
- Garcia Elementary School
- Hilwan Primary School
- Joaquin Artuz Elementary School
- Katipunan Elementary School
- Lagdungan Elementary School
- Lahug Primary School
- Libertad Elementary School
- Kings Meadow School
- Mabini Primary School
- Maliao Elementary School
- Malitbog Elementary School
- Mariano Gleyo Elementary School
- Martin Gimeno Elementary School
- Mawang Elementary School
- Minan Primary School
- Nayawan Primary School
- Rizal Norte Primary School
- Rizal Sur Primary School
- Roosevelt Elementary School
- Roxas Elementary School
- San Antonio Elementary School
- San Jose Elementary School
- San Julian Elementary School
- San Miguel Ilawod Elementary School
- San Miguel Ilaya Elementary School
- San Nicolas Elementary School
- San Roque Elementary School
- Sinonod Primary School
- Siya Elementary School
- Sta. Ana Elementary School
- Sta. Petronila PS
- Switch Elementary School
- Tabon Elementary School
- Tacayan Primary School
- Taganghin Primary School
- Tapaz Christian School
- Tapaz Central Elementary School
- Taslan Elementary School
- Wright Elementary School

Secondary schools

- Bag-ong Barrio National High School
- Camburanan National High School
- Candelaria National High School
- Col. Patrociño Artuz National High School
- Don Leopoldo Gialogo Integrated School
- Rev. Tomas Conejar National High School
- Roxas National High School
- San Nicolas National High School
- Tapaz National High School

Higher educational institution

- Capiz State University
