= Capiz Provincial Board =

Legislative body of the province of Capiz, Philippines

Capiz Provincial Board Sangguniang Panlalawigan ng Capiz

Type
- Type: Unicameral
- Term limits: 3 terms (9 years)

Leadership
- Presiding Officer: Jaime O. Magbanua, 1Capiz since June 30, 2019

Structure
- Seats: 13 board members 1 ex officio presiding officer
- Political groups: 1Capiz (9) PFP (1) Nonpartisan (2)
- Length of term: 3 years
- Authority: Local Government Code of the Philippines

Elections
- Voting system: Plurality-at-large (regular members); Indirect election (ex officio members)
- Last election: May 12, 2025
- Next election: May 15, 2028

Meeting place
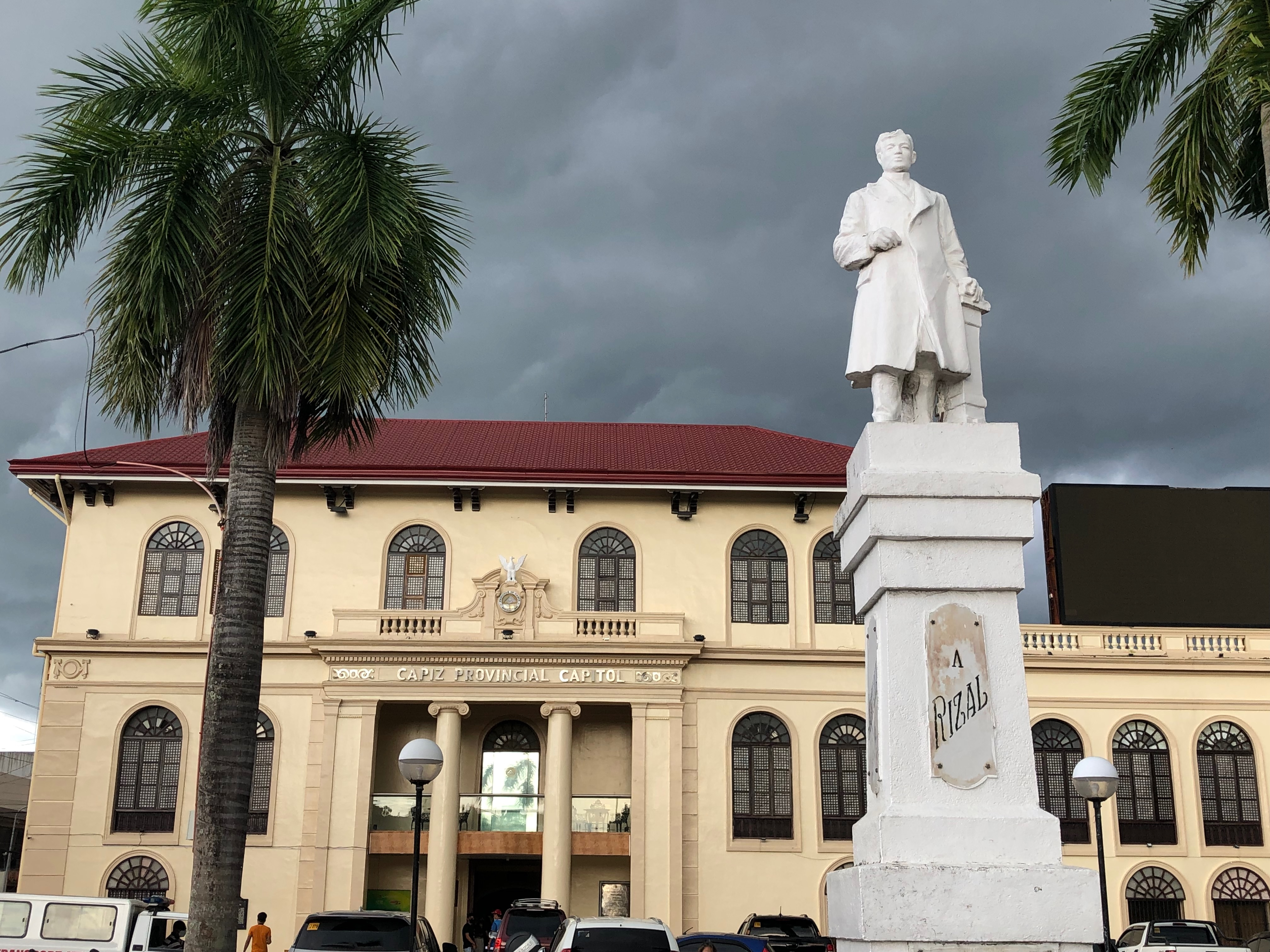
- Capiz Provincial Capitol, Roxas City

The Capiz Provincial Board is the Sangguniang Panlalawigan (provincial legislature) of the Philippine province of Capiz.

The members are elected via plurality-at-large voting: the province is divided into two districts, each having five seats. A voter votes up to five names, with the top five candidates per district being elected. The vice governor is the ex officio presiding officer, and only votes to break ties. The vice governor is elected via the plurality voting system province-wide.

The districts used in appropriation of members is coextensive with the legislative districts of Capiz.

Aside from the regular members, the board also includes the provincial federation presidents of the Liga ng mga Barangay (ABC, from its old name "Association of Barangay Captains"), the Sangguniang Kabataan (SK, youth councils) and the Philippine Councilors League (PCL).

== Apportionment ==
Elections	Seats per district		Ex officio seats	Total seats
Elections	1st	2nd	Ex officio seats	Total seats
2010–present	5	5	3	13

== List of members ==
=== Current members ===
These are the members after the 2025 local elections and 2023 barangay and SK elections:

- Vice governor: Jaime O. Magbanua (1Capiz, since June 30, 2019)

Seat	Board member	Party	Start of term	End of term
1st district	Blesilda P. Almalbis	1Capiz	June 30, 2022	June 30, 2028
1st district	Emmanuel A. Billones Jr.	1Capiz	June 30, 2025	June 30, 2028
1st district	Trina Marie A. Ignacio	1Capiz	June 30, 2022	June 30, 2028
1st district	Cesar S. Yap Jr.	1Capiz	June 30, 2025	June 30, 2028
1st district	Jose Fulgencio A. Del Rosario	PFP	June 30, 2022	June 30, 2028
2nd district	Neriza Joy G. San Felix	1Capiz	June 30, 2022	June 30, 2028
2nd district	Aldwin A. Cruz-Am	1Capiz	June 30, 2022	June 30, 2028
2nd district	Ma. Ivy A. Fundal	1Capiz	June 30, 2022	June 30, 2028
2nd district	Gilbert O. Ardivilla	1Capiz	June 30, 2022	June 30, 2028
2nd district	Cecilio F. Fecundo	1Capiz	June 30, 2022	June 30, 2028
ABC	Querubin Pamplona	Nonpartisan	July 30, 2018	January 1, 2023
PCL				June 30, 2028
SK	Renzo Teves	Nonpartisan	June 8, 2018	January 1, 2023

=== Committee chairpersons ===
Committee	Chairperson
Agriculture	Enrique V. Martin
Appropriations	Jonathan B. Besa
Barangay Affairs	Querubin P. Pamplona
Cooperatives, Non-Governmental and People's Organizations	Eleuper M. Martinez
Economic Affairs, Trade, Commerce, and Industry	Karen A. Palomar
Education, Science and Technology, Social Welfare, Women, Family and Persons with Disabilities	Thea Faith T. Reyes
Ethics	Mitchelle John B. Patricio
Environment and Natural Resources	Mateo C. Hachuela
Health	Esteban Jose B. Contreras
Infrastructure, Public Works and Highways	Weldie C. Apolinario Jr.
Justice and Human Rights	Enrique V. Martin
Labor	Karen A. Palomar
Laws and Good Governance	Eleuper M. Martinez
Local Government	Mitchelle John B. Patricio
Peace, Order, and Public Safety	Elmer P. Arevalo
Reorganization	Esteban Jose B. Contreras
Rules and Privileges	Mateo C. Hachuela
Senior Citizen Affairs	Elmer P. Arevalo
Tourism, Culture, Arts and Indigenous People	Victor L. Tanco Jr.
Transportations, Communications and Public Utility	Jonathan B. Besa
Ways and Means	Victor L. Tanco Jr.
Youth and Sports	Renzo B. Teves
Zoning, Land and Coastal Use, Housing	Weldie C. Apolinario Jr.

=== Vice Governor ===
Election year	Name	Party	Ref.
2007	Felipe B. Barredo	Liberal	
2010	Esteban Evan Contreras	Liberal	
2013	Esteban Evan Contreras	Liberal	
2016	Esteban Evan Contreras	Liberal	
2019	Jaime O. Magbanua	NUP	
2022	Jaime O. Magbanua	Lakas	
2025	Jaime O. Magbanua	1-Capiz	

=== 1st District ===
- Population (2024):

Election year	Member (party)	Member (party)	Member (party)	Member (party)	Member (party)	Ref.
2016	Blesilda P. Almalbis (Liberal)	Jonathan Besa (Liberal)	Eduardo Magallanes (Liberal)	Roberto Ignacio (Liberal)	Enrique Martin (Liberal)	
2019	Esteban Jose B. Contreras (Liberal)	Jonathan Besa (Liberal)	Weldie Apolinario (Liberal)	Thea Faith Reyes (Liberal)	Enrique Martin (Liberal)	
2022	Blesilda P. Almalbis (PDP–Laban)	Jonathan Besa (Liberal)	Jose Fulgencio A. del Rosario (Liberal)	Thea Faith Reyes (Liberal)	Trina Marie Ignacio (Liberal)	
2025	Blesilda P. Almalbis (1Capiz)	Emmanuel A. Billiones (1Capiz)	Jose Fulgencio A. del Rosario (PFP)	Cesar S. Yap, Jr. (1Capiz)	Trina Marie A. Ignacio (1Capiz)	

=== 2nd District ===
- Population (2024):

Election year	Member (party)	Member (party)	Member (party)	Member (party)	Member (party)	Ref.
2016	Victor Tanco, Jr. (Liberal)	Karen A. Palomar (Liberal)	Eleuper M. Martinez (Liberal)	Jeffrey A. Layo (NUP)	Milo B. Lopez (NUP)	
2019	Victor Tanco, Jr. (Liberal)	Karen A. Palomar (Liberal)	Eleuper M. Martinez (Liberal)	Mateo C. Hachuela (NUP)	Elmer P. Arevalo (NUP)	
2022	Neriza Joy G. San Felix (PDP–Laban)	Aldwin A. Cruz-Am (PDP–Laban)	Gilbert O. Ardivilla (Lakas)	Cecilio F. Fecundo (Lakas)	Elmer P. Arevalo (Lakas)	
2025	Neriza Joy G. San Felix (1Capiz)	Aldwin A. Cruz-Am (1Capiz)	Gilbert O. Ardivilla (1Capiz)	Cecilio F. Fecundo (1Capiz)	Ma. Ivy A. Fundal (1Capiz)	
