= Capiz =

- Province
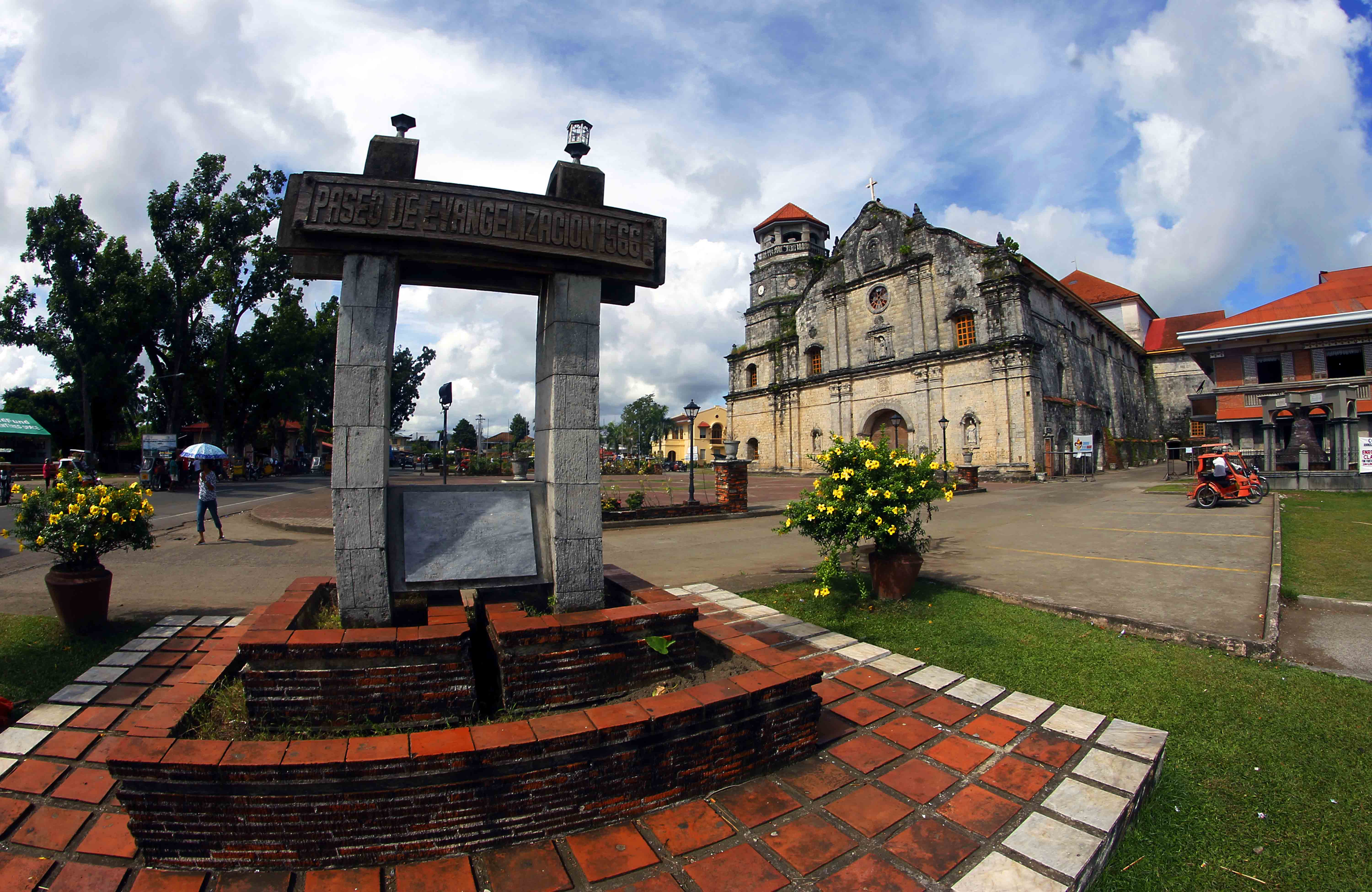
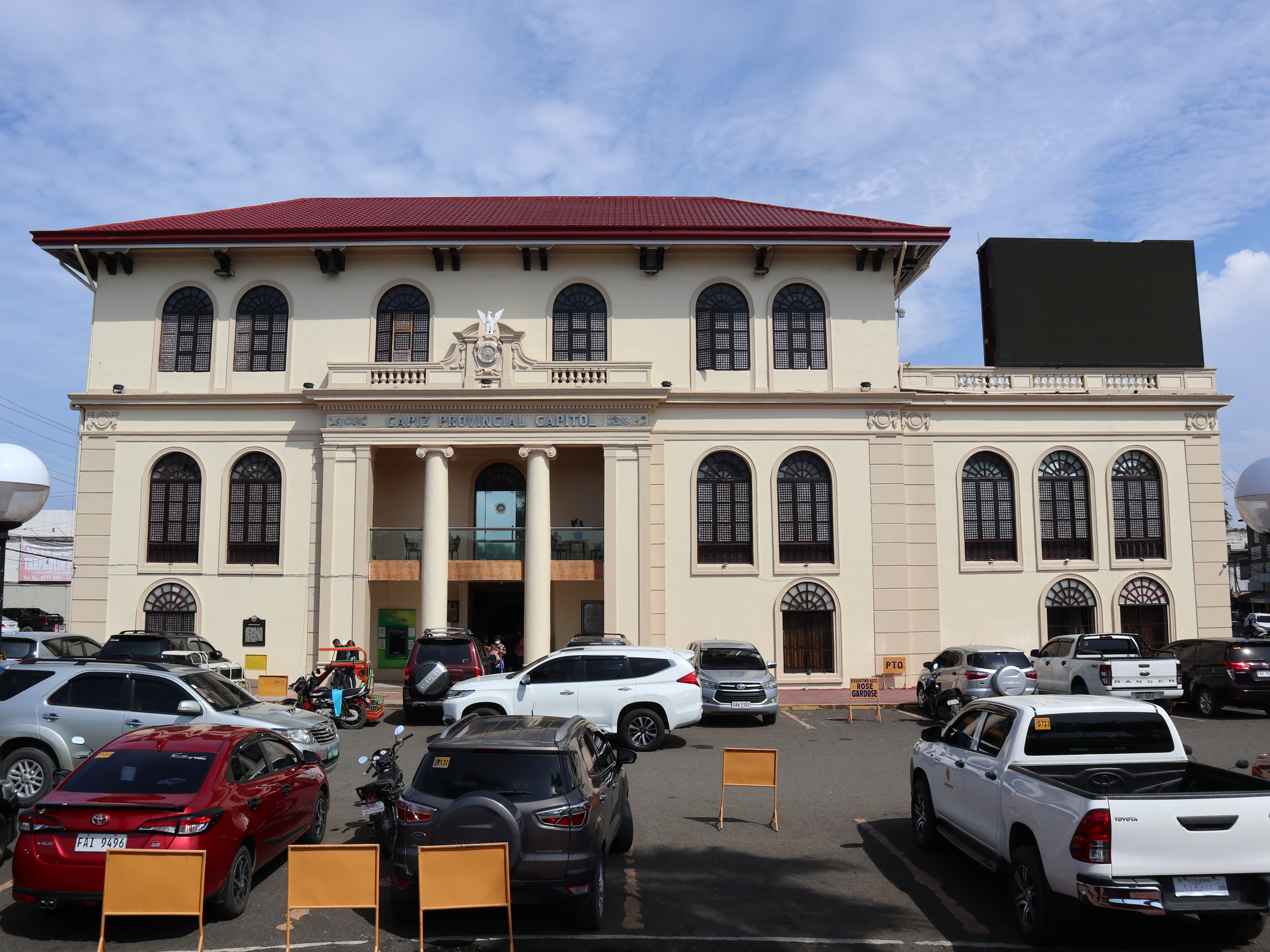
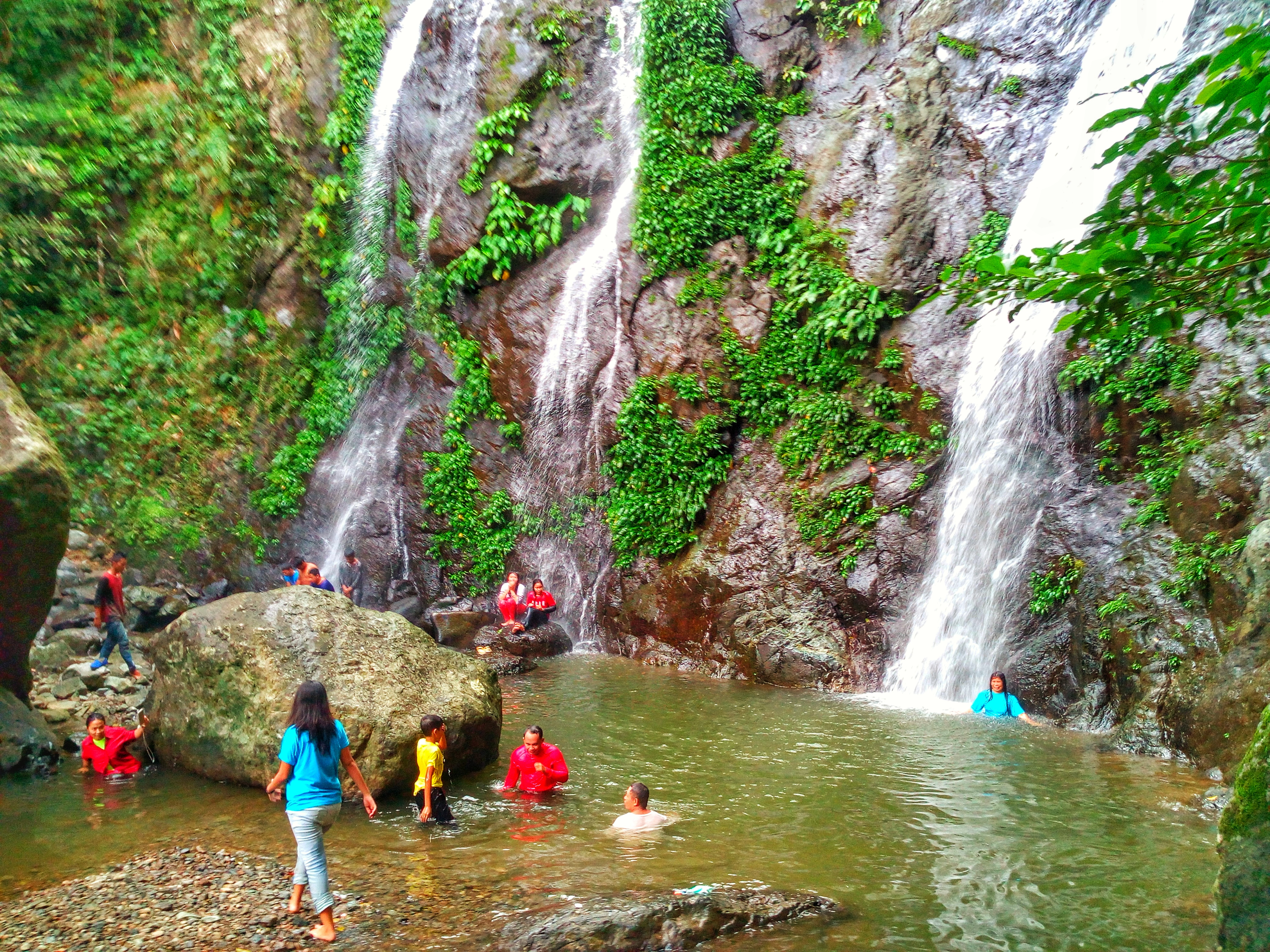
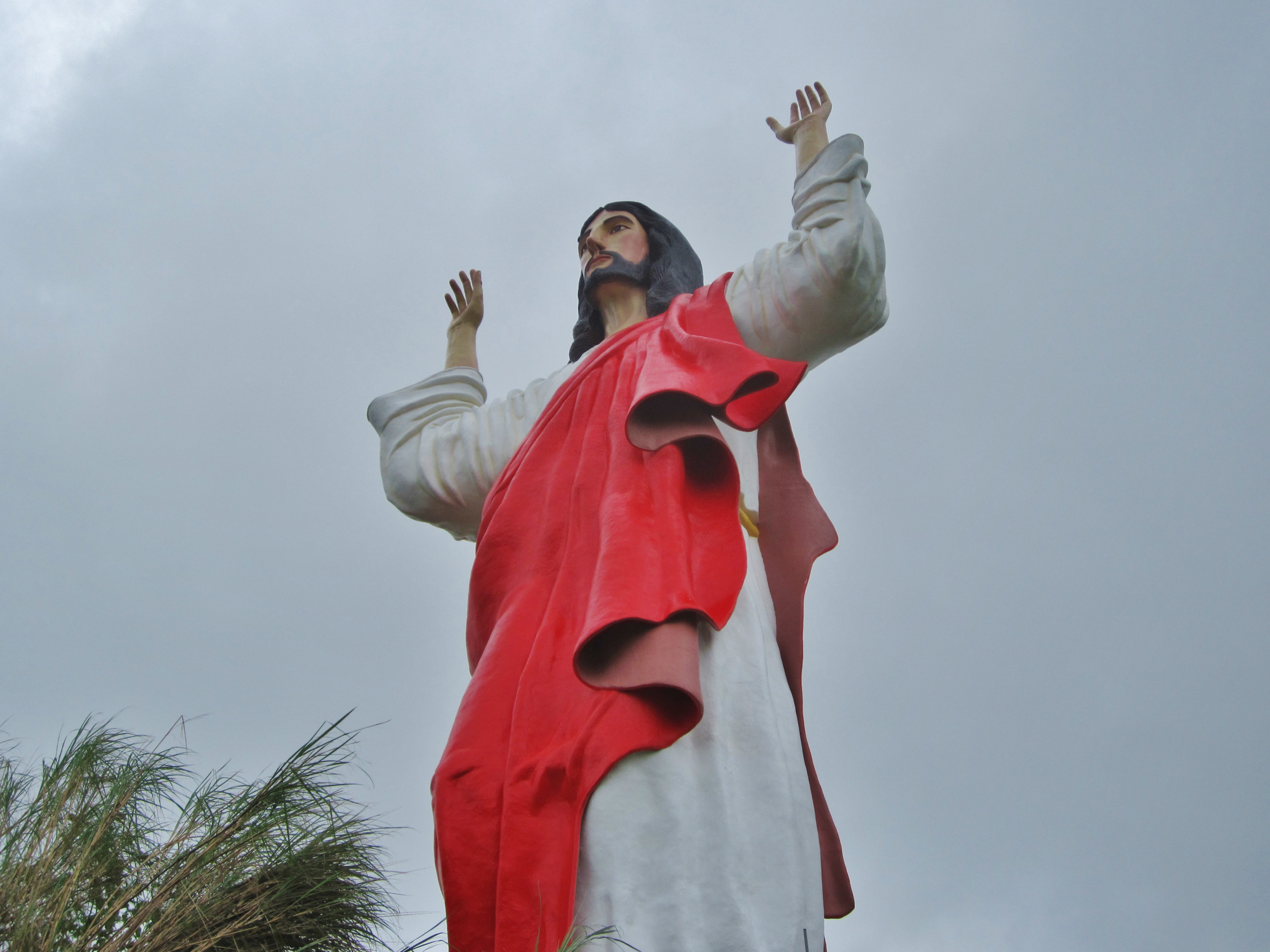
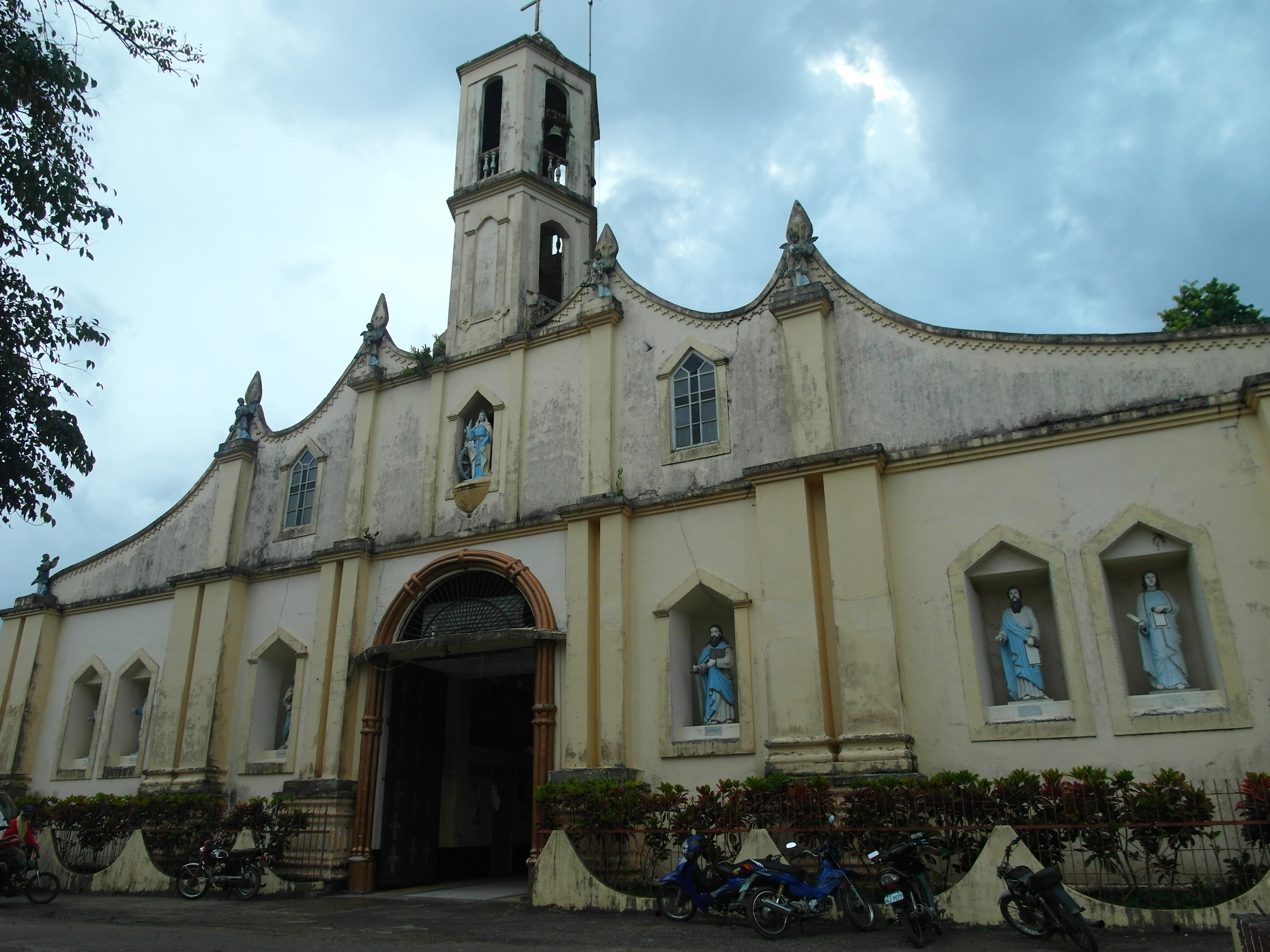
- (from top: left to right) Panay Church, Capiz Provincial Capitol, Hinulugan Falls, Statue of Sacred Heart of Jesus, and Mambusao Church

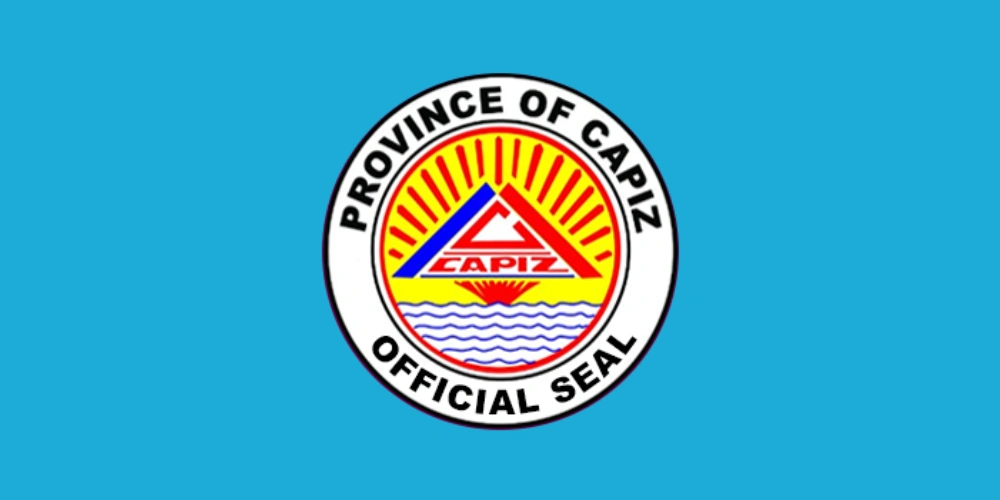
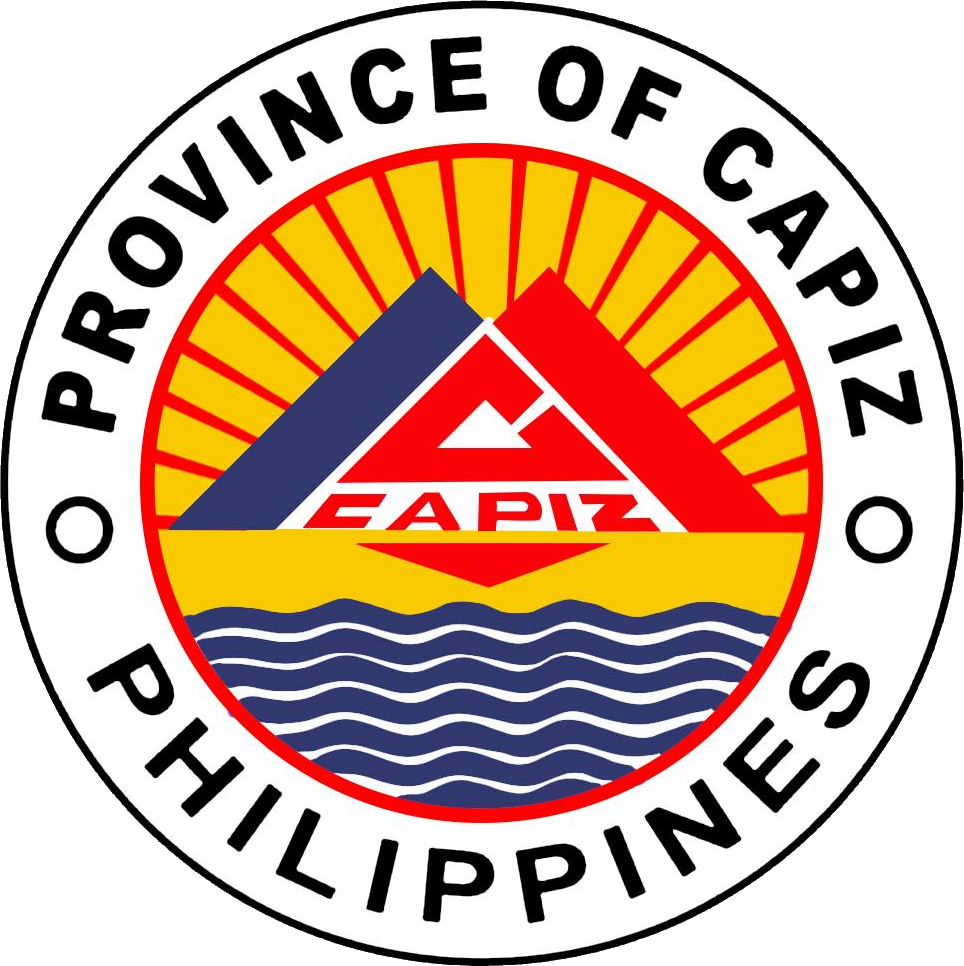
- Flag Seal
- Nickname: Seafood Capital of the Philippines
- Anthem: O, Capiz
- Location in the Philippines
- Interactive map of Capiz
- Coordinates: 11°23′N 122°38′E
- Country: Philippines
- Region: Western Visayas
- Spanish Settlement: 1566
- Encomienda: 1569
- Politico-Military Province: 1716
- Founded: April 15, 1901
- Capital and largest city: Roxas City

Government
  - Governor: Fredenil H. Castro (1Capiz)
  - Vice Governor: James "Mitang" O. Magbanua (1Capiz)
  - Legislature: Capiz Provincial Board
  - Electorate: 539,459 voters (2025)

Area
  - Total: 2,594.64 km^{2} (1,001.80 sq mi)
  - Rank: 52nd out of 82
- Highest elevation (Mount Nangtud): 2,074 m (6,804 ft)

Population (2024 census)
  - Total: 835,098
  - Rank: 38th out of 82
  - Density: 321.855/km^{2} (833.601/sq mi)
  - Rank: 25th out of 82
  - Households: 202,033
- Demonym: Capiznon/Capizeño

Divisions
  - Independent cities: 0
  - Component cities: 1: Roxas
  - Municipalities: 16: Cuartero; Dao; Dumalag; Dumarao; Ivisan; Jamindan; Maayon; Mambusao; Panay; Panitan; Pilar; Pontevedra; President Roxas; Sapian; Sigma; Tapaz
  - Barangays: 473
  - Districts: Legislative districts of Capiz

Economy
  - Income class: 1st provincial income class
  - Poverty incidence: 9.8% (2023)
  - Revenue: ₱ 2,596 million (2024)
  - Assets: ₱ 7,083 million (2024)
  - Expenditure: ₱ 1,014 million (2024)
  - Liabilities: ₱ 737.2 million (2024)
  - HDI: ▲0.650 (Medium)
  - HDI rank: 32nd in Philippines (2019)
  - GDP: ₱74.38 billion $1.268 billion (2022)
- Time zone: UTC+8 (PST)
- PSGC: 061900000
- IDD : area code: +63 (0)36
- ISO 3166 code: PH-CAP
- Spoken languages: Capiznon; Hiligaynon; Aklanon; Kinaray-a; Igbok; Tagalog; English
- Website: capiz.gov.ph

Capiz ([kɑˈpiz]), officially the Province of Capiz (Capiznon/Hiligaynon: Kapuoran sang Capiz; Tagalog: Lalawigan ng Capiz), is a province in the central part of the Western Visayas region of the Philippines. Capiz is located at the northeastern portion of Panay Island, bordering three other provinces, Aklan to the north, Antique to the west, and Iloilo to the south. Capiz faces the Sibuyan Sea to the north. The capital city is Roxas, which is also the most populous city.

Capiz is known for the Placuna placenta oyster shell that has the same name locally and is used for decoration and making lampshades, trays, doors and capiz-shell windows. Likewise, the province is known as the "Seafood Capital of the Philippines" and was among the top 15 most frequently visited places in the Philippines. Capiz is the site of the famous coral-stone Santa Mónica Church in the town of Panay, home to the largest Catholic Church bell in Asia. The bell was made from 70 sacks of gold and silver coins donated by the townsfolk. Measuring seven feet in diameter, five feet in height and weighing 10,400 kilograms or just over 10 metric tons, the Panay bell is popular among tourists visiting Capiz.

== History ==
=== Rival kingdoms period ===
According to the epic of Maragtas, Capiz was settled by datus from Borneo who fled the oppression of Rajah or Sultan Makutanao of Sarawak. And, after the datus founded new towns in Panay island, Negros island, Taal lake, and the Bicol region, they organized a successful expedition to retake their conquered homeland and sacked the capital of Sultan Makatunao, Odtojonan, and they killed him, and afterwards enslaved his subjects and made them vassals in the new towns the datus established in the Philippines. After this brief war with Sultan Makatunao, the Kedatuan of Madja-as including the datus of Capiz, often raided Luzon and Mindoro in the north; the locations of the kingdoms of Tondo and Ma-i that there is an old Capiznon saying: “sa diin timo nangayaw nga mait” which translates as “did you raid (pangayaw) up north (mait)?” but actually means “where have you been?”, as a memory of Capiznon raids against the kingdoms of Luzon.

=== Spanish colonial era ===
The account of early Spanish explorers about Capiz and its people was traced back in 1566 when the Spaniards set foot in the mouth of Banica river.

Early settlements were seen in the town of Panay. The town was originally called Bamban. The name was changed by the early Spaniards to Panay, a word which means "mouth of the river." This is also the location of a fortress built by Juan de la Isla in late 1570. The Paseo de Evangelización 1566 can be found in the town plaza and was erected through the efforts of Rev. Msgr. Benjamin F. Advíncula.

When the Spaniards led by Miguel López de Legazpi came to Panay from Cebu in 1569, after sailing from Mexico, they found people with tattoos, and so they called the island Isla de los Pintados.

How the island itself came to be called Panay is uncertain. The Aeta (Negritos) called it Aninipay, after a plant that abounded in the island. Legend has it that López de Legazpi and his men, in search of food, exclaimed upon the island, pan hay en esta isla! "There is bread in this island"! and the island of Panay closely resembles the shape of a heart and the heart of Jesus Christ is considered present in the Eucharistic Bread. The Spanish then came and established their first settlement on the island at the mouth of the Banica River and called it Panay. This was the second Spanish settlement in the Philippines, following San Miguel, Cebu. Unknown to many, Calle Revolución in Panay is the second oldest street in the Philippines after Calle Colón in Cebu City, Central Visayas. The town was founded by Miguel Lopez de Legaspi with 4 soldiers as settlers and encomienederos.

Later in 1569, Captain Diego de Artieda, who was sent by López de Legazpi, landed in the town of Panay and proclaimed it the capital of the province. Later, the Spaniards moved the capital to its present site upon founding the town of Capiz (not the province, and now Roxas City) which was near the sea and provided docking facilities.

In 1716, the province was created a separate encomienda and was later organized into a politico-military unit. By the end of the 1700s, Capiz had 11,459 native families and 89 Spanish Filipino families.

The Panayanon's noble character and royal blood shone out in later centuries when fellow people from Panay island, at Iloilo City was given by the Queen of Spain, the Royal Title of "Most Loyal and Noble City" for being the most ardent and faithful city in the Spanish Empire and had remained loyal to Spain while the entire empire collapsed.

Since then Capiz (still unseparated from Aklan) had prospered and by the 1818 Spanish census, Capiz' number of Spanish-Filipino families expanded to 285. Of which; Mambusao had 18, Batan had 56, Banga had 8, Malinao had 11, Kalibo had 167, and Ibajay 30. Romblon which was then under Capiz also had 15 Spanish-Filipino families.

Although Capiz joined the Tagalog-led Philippine Revolution, the Spaniards didn't surrender to the Tagalogs but they did surrender to the people of Iloilo and eventually Iloilo and Capiz were part of the same Federal Republic of the Visayas a substate which was formed within the First Philippine Republic, the first capital of which was in Cavite while the United States of America had betrayed the Philippine Revolution which they initially supported and influential American officers swore allegiance to. These American officers betrayed their oaths and occupied Manila.

=== American colonial era ===
The American takeover of the Philippines resulted in the establishment of a civil government in Capiz on April 15, 1901, by virtue of Act 115.

=== Japanese occupation ===
On April 16, 1942, Imperial Japanese forces landed on Capiz City and occupied the rest of the province. However, on December 20, 1944, Capizanon guerrillas, whose forces had already occupied most of the province, liberated the capital from Japanese hands, leading to the full liberation of the province.

=== Philippine independence ===
Capiz and Aklan were united under one province until 25 April 1956, when President Ramon Magsaysay signed into law Republic Act 1414 separating the two entities.

=== Martial law era ===
The beginning months of the 1970s had marked a period of turmoil and change in the Philippines, as well as in Capiz. During his bid to be the first Philippine president to be re-elected for a second term, Ferdinand Marcos launched an unprecedented number of foreign debt-funded public works projects. This caused the Philippine economy to take a sudden downwards turn known as the 1969 Philippine balance of payments crisis, which led to a period of economic difficulty and a significant rise of social unrest. With only a year left in his last constitutionally allowed term as president, Ferdinand Marcos placed the Philippines under Martial Law in September 1972 and thus retained the position for fourteen more years. This period in Philippine history is remembered for the Marcos administration's record of human rights abuses, particularly targeting political opponents, student activists, journalists, religious workers, farmers, and others who fought against the Marcos dictatorship.

One of the significant incidents of the era took place as the dictatorship began to fall, when Rodrigo Ponce - a farmer who monitored proceedings as a volunteer for the National Movement for Free Elections (NAMFREL) in Capiz during the 1986 snap elections - was murdered. Four persons came in the room and seized ballot boxes. Because he recognized one of the men, Ponce was brought outside and shot dead. Ponce was later honored by having his name inscribed on the wall of remembrance at the Philippines' Bantayog ng mga Bayani, which honors the martyrs and heroes that resisted the authoritarian regime.

== Geography ==
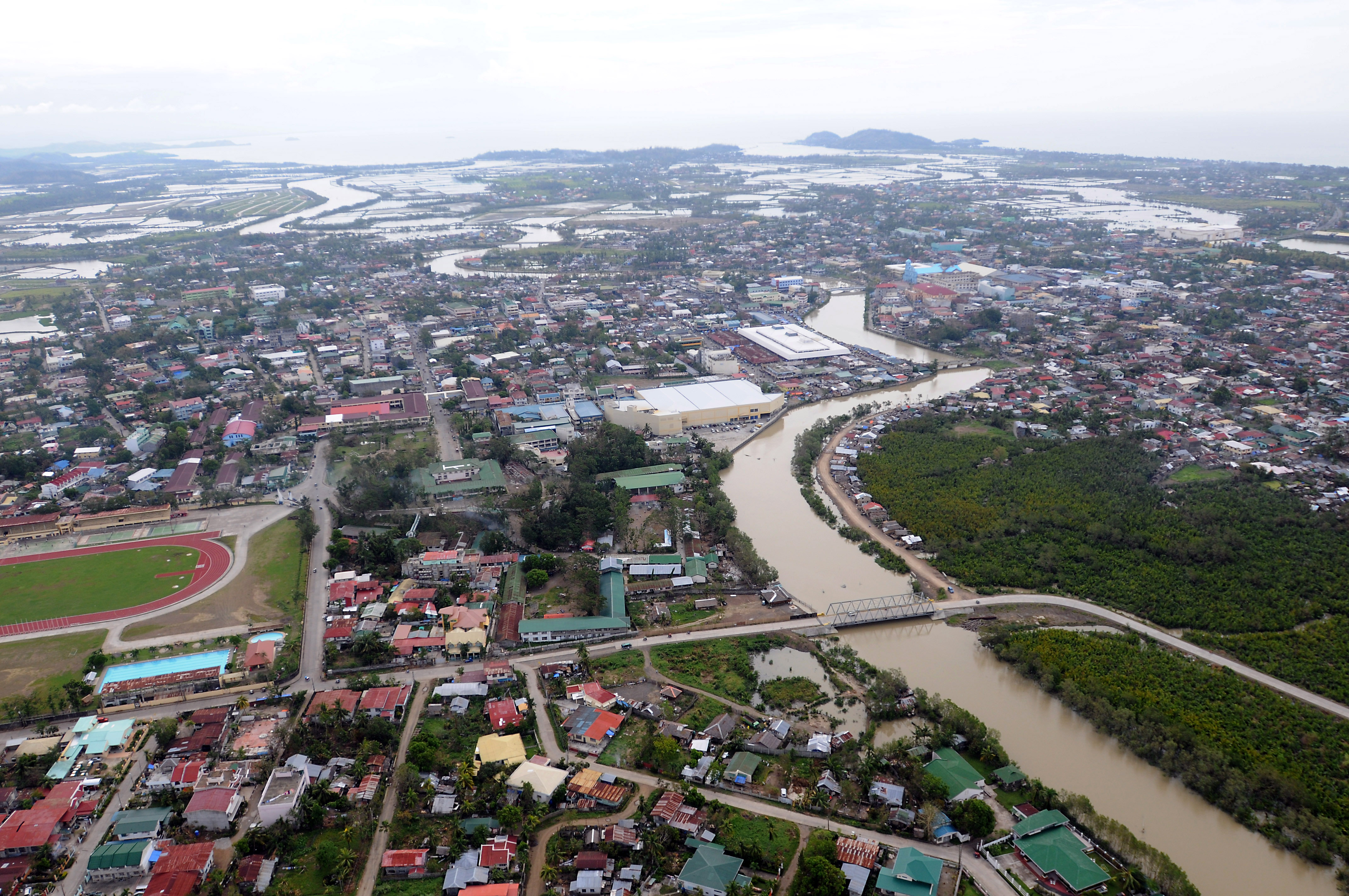
Panay River in Roxas City

Capiz covers a total area of 2,594.64 square kilometres (1,001.80 sq mi) occupying the northeastern portion of Panay Island, and is one of the five provinces that compose the Western Visayas region. Mount Nangtud, is the highest mountain in Capiz with an elevation of 6,804 ft (2,074 m) located on the Capiz-Antique border. Other peaks are Mount Tigas 4,760 ft (1,451 m), Mount Agudo 2,736 ft (834 m). The province comprises 473 barangays, 16 municipalities and a city. Roxas City, the provincial capital, is only 45 minutes away by plane from Manila and is within the routes of major shipping lines. The Panay River used to be famous for the great number of crocodiles thriving there. Capiz is bounded by the Sibuyan Sea and the Panay, Loctugan and Ivisan rivers.

=== Administrative divisions ===
Capiz comprises 1 city (Roxas) and 16 municipalities, further subdivided into 473 barangays, with 2 congressional districts.

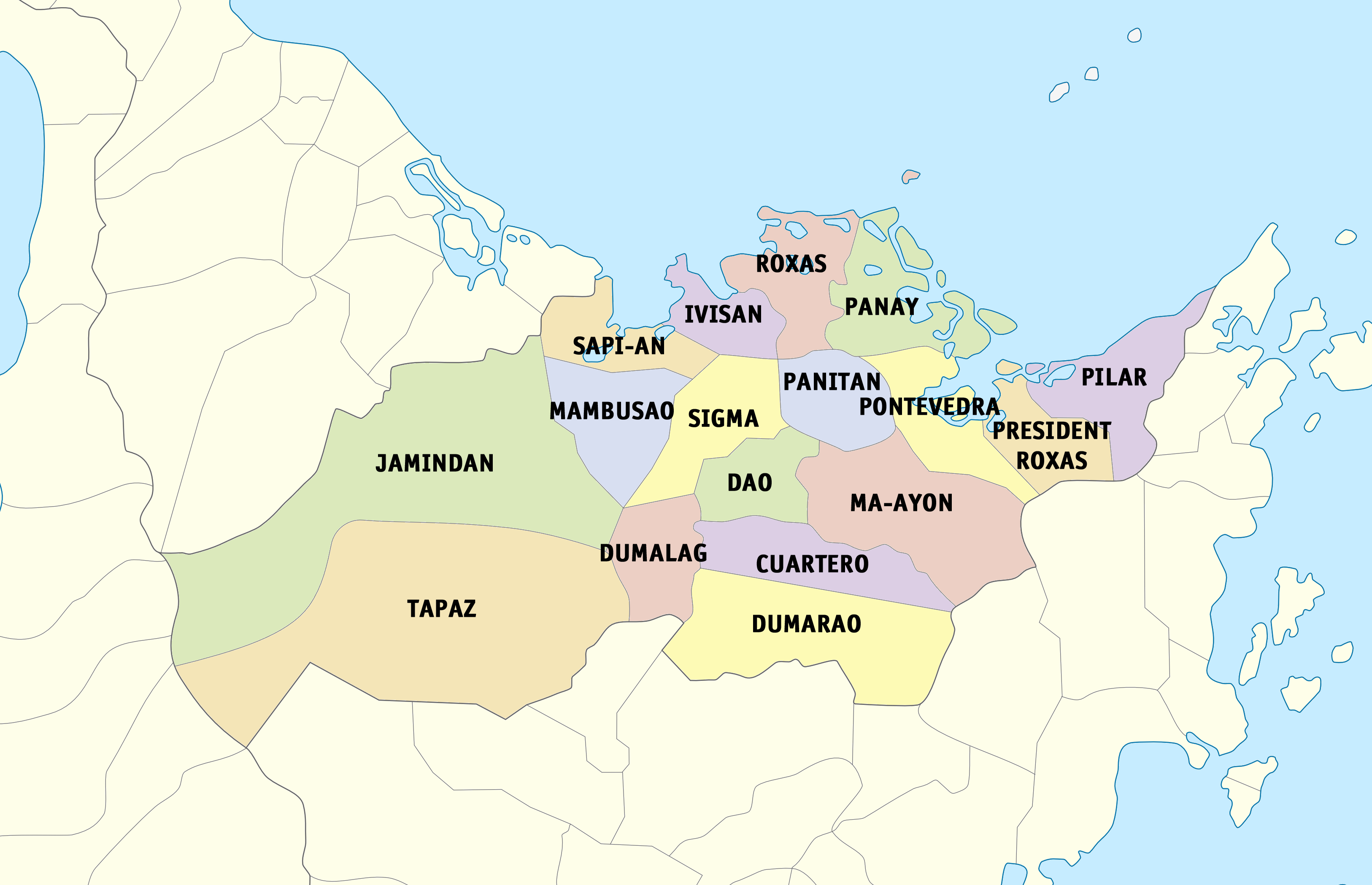
Administrative divisions of Capiz

- † Provincial capital and component city
- Municipality

City or municipality		District	Population			±% p.a.	Area		Density		Barangay	Coordinates^{[A]}
			(2020)		(2015)		km^{2}	sq mi	/km^{2}	/sq mi		
Cuartero		2nd	3.5%	27,993	27,408	+0.40%	106.58	41.15	260	670	22	11°20′28″N 122°40′10″E
Dao		2nd	4.2%	33,842	32,496	+0.78%	88.64	34.22	380	980	20	11°23′38″N 122°41′07″E
Dumalag		2nd	3.7%	30,098	29,466	+0.40%	109.18	42.15	280	730	19	11°18′15″N 122°37′17″E
Dumarao		2nd	6.2%	49,506	46,157	+1.34%	232.56	89.79	210	540	33	11°15′48″N 122°41′14″E
Ivisan		2nd	3.9%	31,278	29,055	+1.41%	54.20	20.93	580	1,500	15	11°31′18″N 122°41′27″E
Jamindan		2nd	4.8%	38,670	36,677	+1.01%	412.03	159.09	94	240	30	11°24′32″N 122°30′38″E
Maayon		1st	5.1%	41,226	38,416	+1.35%	142.32	54.95	290	750	32	11°23′15″N 122°46′52″E
Mambusao		2nd	5.1%	40,690	39,644	+0.50%	136.91	52.86	300	780	26	11°25′36″N 122°35′39″E
Panay		1st	6.1%	48,890	46,114	+1.12%	116.37	44.93	420	1,100	42	11°33′16″N 122°47′27″E
Panitan		1st	5.3%	42,565	40,289	+1.05%	89.88	34.70	470	1,200	26	11°27′47″N 122°46′07″E
Pilar		1st	5.9%	47,100	45,287	+0.75%	77.99	30.11	600	1,600	24	11.4861°N 122.9963°E
Pontevedra		1st	6.2%	49,725	46,428	+1.31%	130.90	50.54	380	980	26	11°28′54″N 122°49′58″E
President Roxas		1st	3.9%	31,269	29,676	+1.00%	77.88	30.07	400	1,000	22	11°25′51″N 122°55′35″E
Roxas City	†	1st	22.3%	179,292	167,003	+1.36%	95.07	36.71	1,900	4,900	47	11°35′22″N 122°45′00″E
Sapian		2nd	3.3%	26,697	25,821	+0.64%	105.24	40.63	250	650	10	11°29′39″N 122°36′14″E
Sigma		2nd	3.9%	31,688	30,134	+0.96%	101.71	39.27	310	800	21	11°25′16″N 122°39′57″E
Tapaz		2nd	6.8%	54,423	51,313	+1.13%	517.18	199.68	110	280	58	11°15′41″N 122°32′15″E
Total				804,952	761,384	+1.07%	2,594.64	1,001.80	310	800	473	(see GeoGroup box)
1. Coordinates mark the city/town center, and are sortable by latitude.

== Demographics ==
Population census of Capiz
Year	Pop.	±% p.a.
1903	119,948	—
1918	155,342	+1.74%
1939	228,660	+1.86%
1948	244,889	+0.76%
1960	315,079	+2.12%
1970	394,041	+2.26%
1975	445,716	+2.50%
1980	492,231	+2.00%
1990	584,091	+1.73%
1995	624,469	+1.26%
2000	654,156	+1.00%
2007	701,664	+0.97%
2010	719,685	+0.93%
2015	761,384	+1.08%
2020	804,952	+1.18%
2024	835,098	+0.89%
Source: Philippine Statistics Authority

The population of Capiz in the 2024 census was 835,098 people, with a density of 320 inhabitants per square kilometre or 830 inhabitants per square mile.

=== Inhabitants ===
Historians and ethnologists narrowed it down to three types of people known to have inhabited Capiz: Atis/Aetas, popularly known as Negritos; Indonesian descendants of the Mundo tribe in central Panay; and the Malays.

==== Sulod tribe ====
Located in Tapaz, Suludnon also known as the Tumandok, Panay-Bukidnon, or Panayanon Sulud, are culturally indigenous Visayan group of people who reside in the Capiz-Lambunao mountainous area and the Antique-Iloilo mountain area of Panay in the Visayan islands of the Philippines. They speak the Igbok language (also known as Ligbok or Sulod language), a member of the West Bisayan subdivision of the Bisayan languages within the Austronesian language family.

=== Religion ===
Roman Catholicism remains influential in the lives of most people living in Capiz especially in the fields of politics, education and even in their daily personal decisions. Roman Catholics are predominant with 70 percent adherence, the Iglesia Filipina Independiente has a strong minority with 20 percent.

Other groups include Members Church of God International (MCGI), Born Again Christians, Iglesia ni Cristo, Methodists, The Church of Jesus Christ of Latter-day Saints, Baptists, Jehovah's Witnesses, and Seventh-day Adventists among others.

=== Languages ===
There are two main local languages: Capiznon and Hiligaynon. Filipino and English are also used and understood as administrative and business languages and are widely spoken as second languages. Aklanon is spoken in towns near Aklan such as Sapian, Jamindan, and Mambusao. Kinaray-a is spoken in towns in the southern and western part of the province such as Jamindan, Tapaz, Dumalag, and Dumarao.

Capiznon is concentrated in the province of Capiz in the northeast of Panay. It is a member of the Visayan language family and the people using it are part of the wider Visayan ethnolinguistic group, who constitute the largest Filipino ethnolinguistic group. It is related but often confused with Hiligaynon/Ilonggo, yet it has its own unique vocabulary and accent, as well as a handful of words unique to the language itself.

== Government ==
=== Provincial government ===
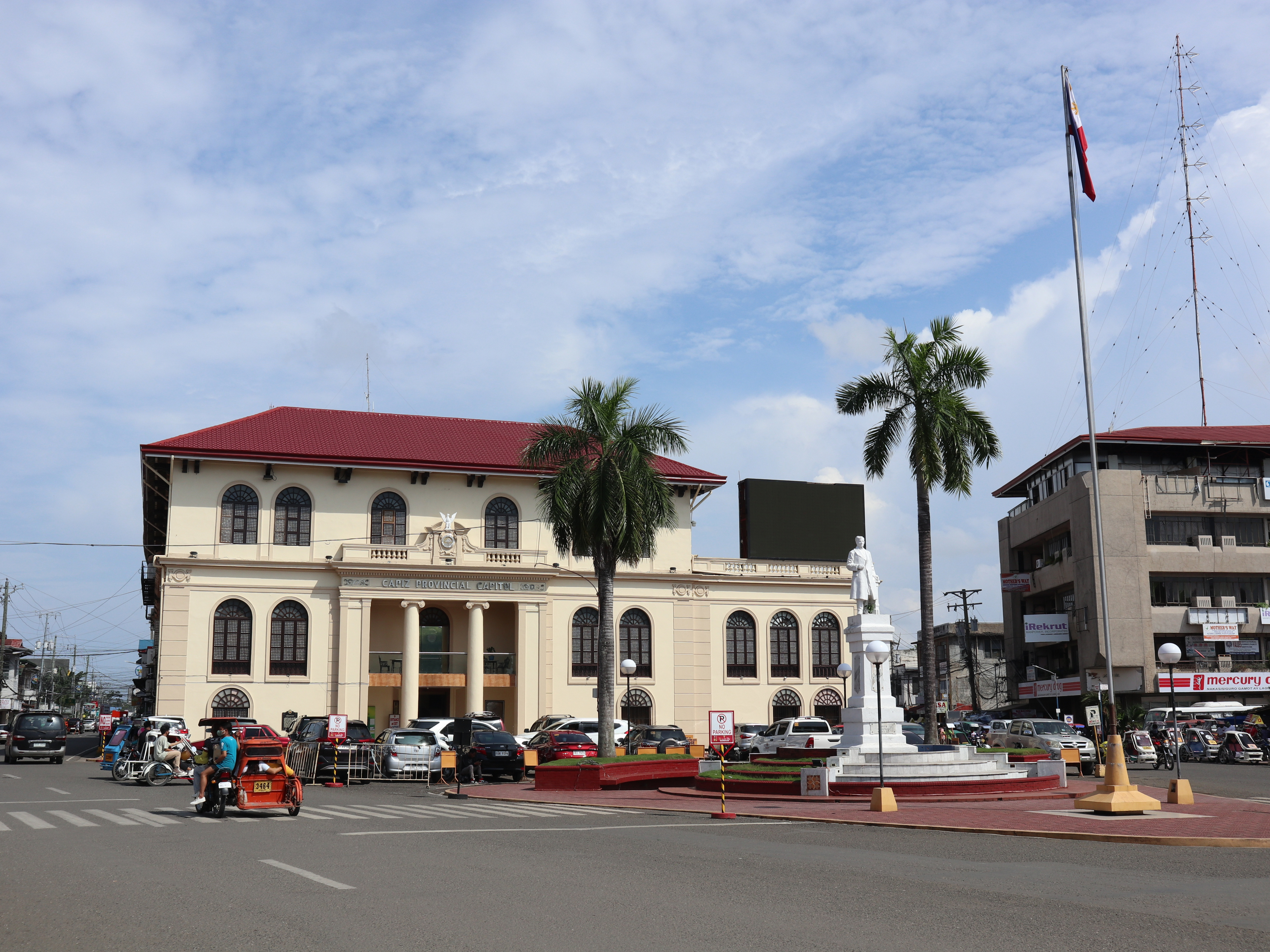
Capiz Provincial Capitol in Roxas, the seat of the provincial government

The governor serves as the chief executive of the province while the vice governor serves as the presiding officer of the Sangguniang Panlalawigan (lit. 'Provincial Council' popularly known as 'Provincial Board').

The Sangguniang Panlalawigan is composed of ten members (known as 'board members' or 'BM') from the two legislative districts of the province elected through popular vote. They are joined by three ex-officio members - the presidents of the province's councilors league, Liga ng mga Barangay, and Sangguniang Kabataan.

The term of office of the incumbent officials, except for the ex-officio members of the Sangguniang Panlalawigan, began at noon of June 30, 2022, and will expire at noon of June 30, 2025.

Governor	Fredenil H. Castro
Vice Governor	Jaime O. Magbanua

Sangguniang Panlalawigan ng Capiz
Members from the First District	Members from the Second District
Blesilda P. Almalbis; Emmanuel A. Billones, Jr.; Trina Marie A. Ignacio; Cesar S. Yap, Jr.; Jose Fulgencio A. Del Rosario	Neriza Joy G. San Felix; Aldwin A. Cruz-am; Ma. Ivy A. Fundal; Gilbert O. Ardivilla; Cecilio F. Fecundo
Ex-officio Members
President Philippine Councilors League	Paul Ivan R. Baticados
President Liga ng mga Barangay	Nico A. Yap
President Sangguniang Kabataan Federation	Prince Rovic F. Gardose

=== District Representatives ===
Representatives to the Lower House of Congress
First District	Second District
Ivan Howard A. Guintu	Jane T. Castro

== Economy ==
Poverty incidence of Capiz (%)

Source: Philippine Statistics Authority

With its 80-kilometer coastline and wide expanse of swampy lands easily converted into fishponds, Capiz is dubbed as the "Seafood Capital of the Philippines". It holds one of the richest fishing grounds and is a major contributor to the aquamarine industry of the Philippines. Farming and fishing are the primary sources of income for the people. The combined natural bounty of land and sea sustains a vibrant food industry. Primary agricultural raw products are rice, corn, coconut, sugarcane, banana and cut flower.

Apart from a surplus of agricultural products, Capiz is also a major supplier of prawn and milkfish (bangus). Other agro-industrial harvests include blue marlin, squid, oysters, shrimp, seaweed, and angel wings. Rich fish ponds attract investors to venture into prawn culture, prawn feed manufacture, seaweed farming and the distribution and processing of other marine products. A robust workforce of 445,246 operates with a literacy rate of 92.04%. Its relatively unexplored caves are said to have high deposits of mineral resources such as limestone, gold and metal.

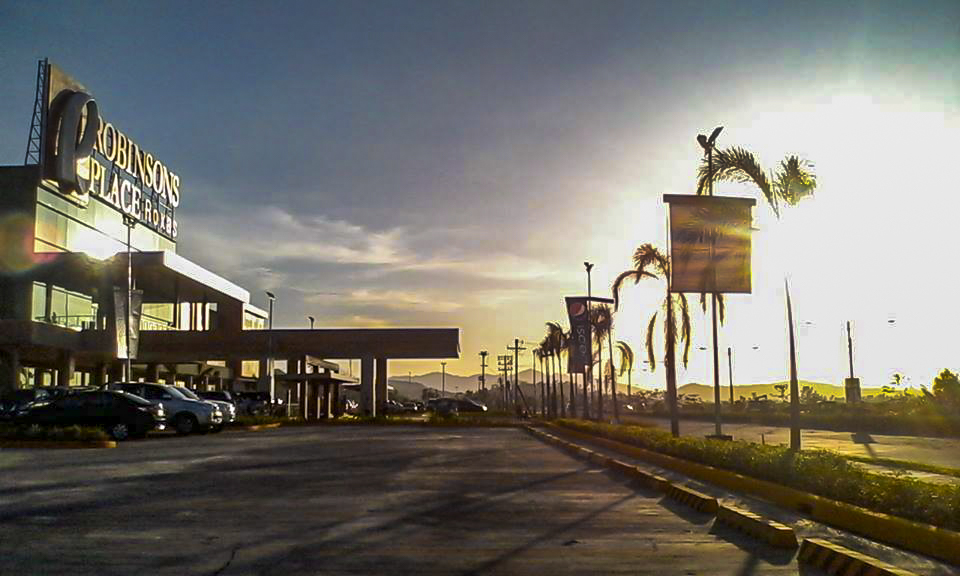
Robinsons Place Roxas

=== Telecommunications ===
Four big telecommunication companies offer telegraph, telex and telephone services. Communication facilities are catered by the Philippine Long Distance Telephone Company (PLDT), Bureau of Telecommunications (BUTEL), PT&T, RCPI-Bayantel, Globelines-Islacom and cellular phone companies: Smart, Globe, Dito, Touch Mobile & Talk and Text. Internet services are also available like PLDT Vibe and Wesfardell Connect.

=== Media ===
Broadcast media is catered by 3 AM radio stations namely: AM - IBC DYJJ, DYOW - Bombo Radyo, DYVR - RMN Roxas.

FM stations. like 103.7 Star FM, 105.7 Love Radio, 97.7 Radyo Todo, 102.5 Baskog Radyo, 100.9 K5, News FM, 95.7 Brigada News FM, 93.9 IFM Roxas, 98.9 Radyo Alternatibo and minor FM Stations like CAP Rhythm, 88.1 Spirit FM Roxas and recently 106.5 XFM Roxas.

Television facilities reach the city through Iloilo. There are two cable television providers, Wesfardell Cable Services and Filvision, Inc. (Altocable).

GMA Network and SMNI are two television relay stations that are now operating in the city.

Capiz is also home to digital news publishing platforms.

=== Banks ===
There are more than 60 banking institutions and 116 intermediaries operating in the province.

=== Capiz products ===
Some popular Capiz shell chips decorating designs include gift items, indoor decoration and outdoor decoration ornaments. Capiz chip-made products range from lanterns, lamp shades, capiz-shell window panes, chandeliers, curtains, picture panels and frames, Capiz shell balls, plates, decorative bowls, candle holders, tiles, flower vase, door hanging chime, soapdish, pendant, globelight, necklace decor, beads, bird cage, floor lamp holders, faux chandelier, gift boxes, collection item rack and many more.

Bulad or dried fish is a major product. There are several varieties of dried fish that can be found in Capiz.

== Culture ==
Capiz is known for its trademark product, the brilliant Capiz shell, used in capiz-shell windows, lanterns, decorations, vases, etc. The Capiz shell has a luster similar to mother of pearl shells.

=== Hymn ===
The official hymn of Capiz, O, Capiz was adopted in June 2006 by ordinance of the Sangguniang Panlalawigan. Vicente Bermejo, former province governor stated "we need a melody that will inspire us and forge our efforts together to achieve our dream for a better Capiz," in support of the hymn's incorporation.

=== Folk dances ===
Capiz is one of the places in the Philippines that contributes a lot to Philippine folk dancing. The province alone has 19 Visayan folk dances such as "Tinolabong", "Gayong-gayong", "Timawa", Dagit-dagit", "Beneracion", "Tatay Meroy Cariñosa", "Pukol", "Habanera Capiceña", "Cabatingan", "Saad", "Pitik Mingaw", "Kuratsa Capiceña", and "Palomita Coquitana" to name a few.

=== Festivals ===
- Saot Capiz – A cultural presentation – The First Capiz Dance Season held every Saturday at the Capiz Provincial Park, Roxas City.
- Sinadya sa Halaran – Is a merging of the Roxas City Fiesta "Sinadya" and the Province celebration of "Halaran". "Sinadya sa Halaran" is a commemoration of the feast of the patroness of Roxas City, which is the Immaculate Conception and a thanksgiving. It literally means "Joy in Sharing and Thanksgiving". Rituals and festivities include fireworks, grand parades, fluvial processions, fairs and food festivals, street dancing, and exhibits. Later, the festival was renamed "Sinadya sa Inmaculada Concepcion" with the dissolution of the Halaran Festival and the re-direction of the city's celebration to its patron, the Immaculate Concepcion. The City of Roxas, to celebrate the organization of its government, now also celebrates "Sugilanon Festival" in May of every year, usually in the week leading to or after May 12, which is the charter day of the city.
- Pangahaw Festival – A thanksgiving for a bountiful harvest by the Indigenous Peoples of Jamindan.
- Guyum-Guyuman Festival – "Caguyuman" the old name of Pontevedra, meaning anthill, a name distinct for ants' house was once a part of the municipality of Pan-ay mainly because of its abundant natural resources both from the coastal and upland areas. People from the nearby municipalities of Panay, Panitan, Maayon and President Roxas, would thrive in the market place like swarm of ants for trading. This rich tradition is now a celebration of life and thanksgiving for all Caguyumanons.
- Talahong Festival – Talaba and tahong is very rich in production in these areas. More than a hundred fisherfolk live along the coast. Since Sapian is abundant with seafoods, it was the initiative of the Local Government Unit to organize a Talahong Festival (Talaba-Tahong) every 2nd Friday and 2nd Saturday of May that promotes the local products.
- Tagbuan Festival – It was conceptualized during the Pre-Spanish time, wherein there were aetas in the upland barangay.

== Transportation ==
=== Air ===
Roxas Airport is an airport serving the general area of Roxas City, the provincial capital. The airport is classified as a Class 1 principal airport, by the Civil Aviation Authority of the Philippines. Roxas Airport has 3 flights daily and 4 flights on selected days courtesy of Philippine Airlines, Cebu Pacific and AirAsia Philippines.

=== Land ===
The primary transportation vehicle used in Roxas City and other municipalities in Capiz is the tricycle. Travel between municipalities is typically by jeepney, vans and Ceres operated buses. "Capiz Cab", the city's taxi that plies Roxas City and the 16 municipalities of the Capiz. Capiz Cabs are the first receipt-issuing taxis in the Philippines apart from those operating out of Ninoy Aquino International Airport.

The Iloilo-Capiz-Aklan Expressway (ICAEx) is a proposed expressway on Panay Island that will connect the province to neighboring provinces of Iloilo and Aklan.

=== Sea ===
Inter and provincial mobility of residents and their cargo is serviced by vans, buses and jeepneys. Sea transportation (cargo vessel) is served by Moreta Lines plying the route of Roxas to Manila. Roll On-Roll Off (Ro-Ro) are served by two shipping companies namely Super Shuttle Roro 2 and 2GO to fetch passengers from Roxas City to Batangas City via Odiongan, Romblon. Inter-island shipping is also served from Roxas City to the following locations such as: Balud, Masbate; Mandaon, Masbate; Sibuyan Island, Romblon; Cadiz, Negros Occidental; Guimaras Island; and Estancia, Iloilo.

== Notable people ==
This list is only for people born or residing in Capiz.

=== Religious ===
- Jose Cardinal Advincula - 9th Filipino Cardinal and the 33rd Archbishop of Manila, served as the 3rd Archbishop of Capiz.
- Victor Barnuevo Bendico - 4th Archbishop of Capiz.
- Midyphil Billones - 5th Archbishop of Jaro.
- Jaime Cardinal Sin - 3rd Filipino Cardinal and the 30th Archbishop of Manila.
- Cyril Villareal - 5th Bishop of Kalibo.

=== Politics ===
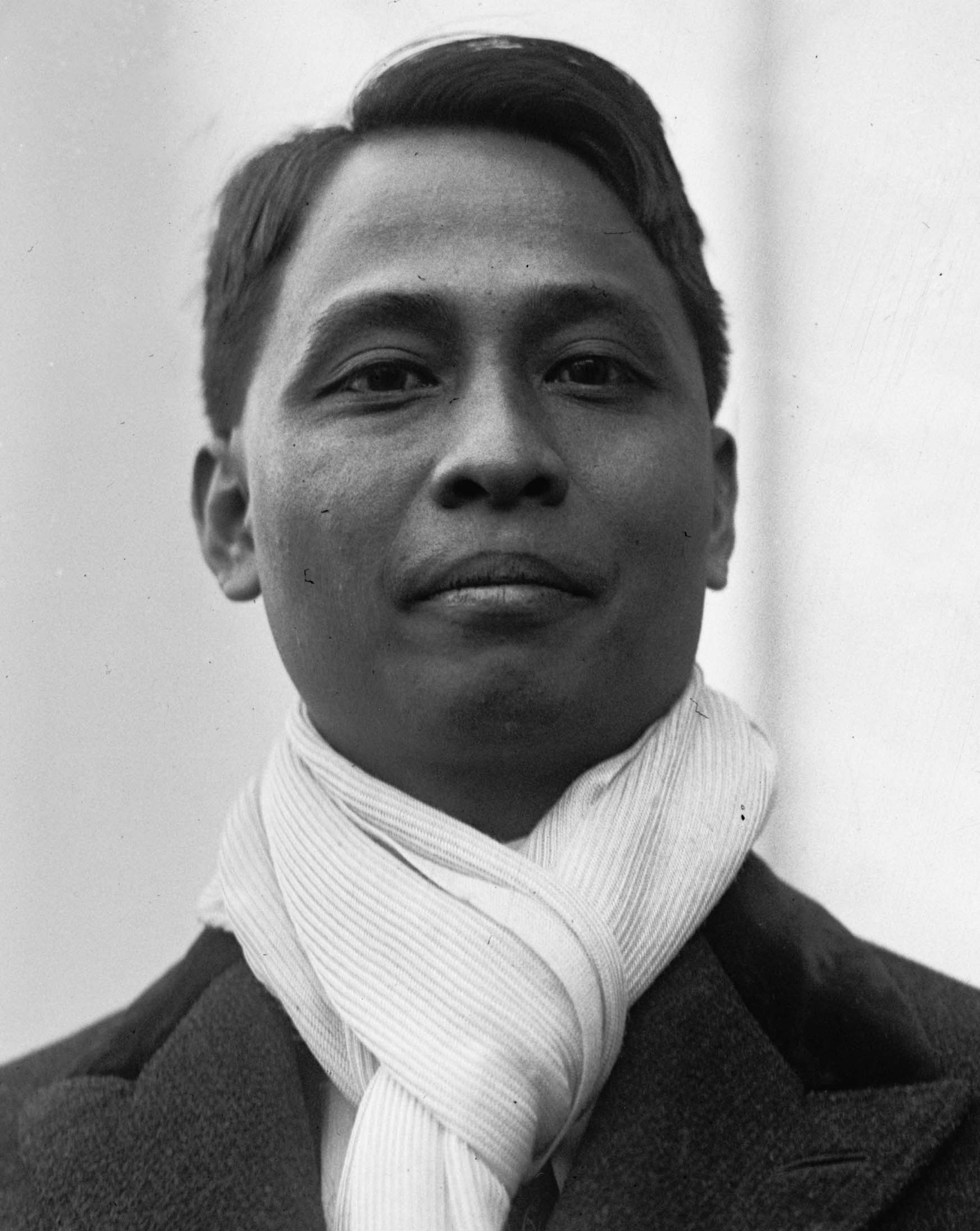
Manuel Roxas, the first president of an independent Philippines, served as governor of Capiz from 1919 until 1922 and represented the province's first district in the House of Representatives from 1922 until 1938.

- Manuel Roxas, first President of the independent Republic of the Philippines.
- Gerardo Roxas, Philippine Senator and son of President Manuel Roxas.
- Jose Hontiveros, Senator of the Insular Government of the Philippine Islands, Associate Justice of the Supreme Court of the Philippines, Governor of Capiz.
- Risa Hontiveros, Senator of the Philippines, Akbayan Representative in Congress.
- Pedro Gil, was a physician, journalist, and legislator. He was elected representative for the south district of Manila on the Democrata party ticket. He became Minority Floor Leader in the House of Representatives of the Philippines.
- Cornelio Villareal, 11th Speaker of the House of Representatives of the Philippines
- Fredenil Castro, former deputy speaker of the House of the Representatives of the Philippines.
- Roy Señeres, Filipino statesman and diplomat.
- Jocelyn Bolante, politician who formerly served as an Undersecretary of the Department of Agriculture of the Philippines.

=== Entertainment ===
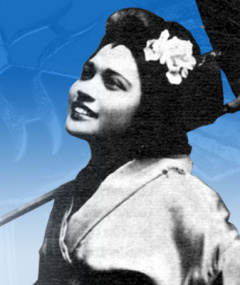
Jovita Fuentes was conferred the Order of National Artist in 1976

*Jovita Fuentes, Dubbed the First Lady of Philippine Music. National Artist of the Philippines for Music.

- Daisy Avellana, actress, National Artist of the Philippines for Theater.
- Gina Alajar, actress and director. She was born in Lanot, Roxas City, Capiz.
- Barbie Almabis-Honasan, singer, former lead singer of Hungry Young Poets and Barbie's Cradle.
- Mikoy Morales, actor, finalist of Protege: The Battle For The Big Artista Break

=== Other ===
- Josepha Abiertas, a feminist and lawyer was born and raised in Capiz.
- Jeckster Apinan, a professional basketball player
- Paolo Bediones is a Filipino commercial model, television host, journalist, newscaster and radio announcer
- Eugenio "Toto" Villareal - lawyer, law professor, and former Chairman, Movie and Television Review and Classification Board (MTRCB).

== See also ==
- Capiznon people
- Capiznon language
- Suludnon people
- Igbok language
