= One Capiz =

Filipino political party based in Capiz

- President: Jaime Magbanua (1st District); Tawi Billones (2nd District)
- Chairperson: Fredenil Castro
- Chairman of the Advisory Council: Mar Roxas
- Founded: September 23, 2024
- Headquarters: Roxas City, Capiz
- Ideology: Localism; Conservative liberalism
- National affiliation: Lakas (2024–present); Liberal (2024–present)
- House of Representatives (Capiz seats only): 1 / 2
- Provincial Governor: 1 / 1
- Provincial Vice Governor: 1 / 1
- Board Members: 9 / 13
- City and municipal mayors: 12 / 17
- City and municipal councilors: 29 / 38

The One Capiz is a local political party based in Capiz, composed of politicians hailing from both the Lakas–CMD and the Liberal Party.

== History ==
One Capiz was founded in 2024 and is led by incumbent Capiz Governor Oto Castro.

One Capiz was launched on September 23, 2024, during the Provincial Executive Council meeting at the Dinggoy Roxas Civic Center. It is launched forming a coalition of political leaders from both the 1st and 2nd districts of Capiz.

Fredenil "Oto" Castro serves as chairman of the party while Mar Roxas is the head of its advisory council.
