= Jane Castro (politician) =

Filipino politician (born 1958)

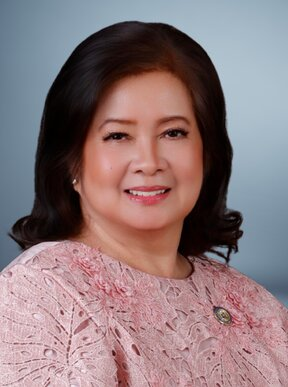
- Official portrait, 2025

Member of the House of Representatives of the Philippines for Capiz's 2nd congressional district
- Incumbent
- Assumed office June 30, 2022
- Preceded by: Fredenil Castro
- In office June 30, 2010 – June 30, 2013
- Preceded by: Fredenil Castro
- Succeeded by: Fredenil Castro

Personal details
- Born: Jane Tan; October 21, 1958 (age 67) Cebu City, Cebu, Philippines
- Party: Lakas (2009–2011; 2021–present); One Capiz (local party; 2024–present)
- Other political affiliations: NUP (2011–2021)
- Spouse: Fredenil Castro

Jane Tan Castro (born October 21, 1958) is a Filipino politician who is a member of the House of Representatives. She represents Capiz's 2nd congressional district. She ran in the 2010 elections, winning. She created many laws, with two of them turning into a Republic Act. She ran again in the 2022 elections under Lakas–CMD, beating four other candidates. She ran in the 2025 elections, winning unopposed.

== Representative (2010-2013) ==
Castro was elected as a representative for the second district of Capiz in the 2010 Philippine House of Representatives elections. She created five laws during the 14th Congress of the Philippines. She created House Bill No. 28 which was filed on July 1, 2010. It granted a security of tenure for government employees. It was eventually accepted by the Philippine House Committee on Rules. The same day, she created House Bill No. 32, which planned a Land Transportation Office in Dumalag. It was accepted by the Committee on Rules. It was accepted by the Congress of the Philippines in the second and the third and final reading, with 213 representatives supporting.

She joined the 15th Congress of the Philippines. She created House Bill No. 3862 which called for the release of retirement benefits. The bill was accepted by the Congress on February 9, 2011. It was then passed to the senate, then passed to President Benigno Aquino III. it was then signed on June 27, making it Republic Act No. 10154. She was the co-author of House Bill No. 4323, the Philippine Interior Design Act of 2011. It was accepted by Congress on March 23, 2012, and signed by the president on November 27.

== Representative (2022-present) ==
In the 2022 Philippine House of Representatives elections, Castro ran under Lakas–CMD. She gained 110,609 votes, 58.26 percent of the votes, beating four other candidates. In the 2025 Philippine House of Representatives elections, she ran under Lakas-CMD. She gained 157,199 votes, 29.14 percent of the votes. Castro ran unopposed.

== See also ==
- 15th Congress of the Philippines
- 19th Congress of the Philippines
