= Capiz's 1st congressional district =

Congressional district of the Philippines

- Constituency for the House of Representatives of the Philippines
- Map
- Location of Capiz within the Philippines
- Province: Capiz
- Region: Western Visayas
- Population: 413,213 (2015)
- Electorate: 239,712 (2016)
- Major settlements: 7 LGUs: Cities; Roxas; Municipalities; Panay; Panitan; Pontevedra; President Roxas; Maayon; Pilar
- Area: 730.41 km^{2}

Current constituency
- Created: 1907
- Representative: Howard Guintu
- Political party: Independent
- Congressional bloc: Majority

Capiz's 1st congressional district is one of the two congressional districts of the Philippines in the province of Capiz. It has been represented in the House of Representatives of the Philippines since 1916 and earlier in the Philippine Assembly from 1907 to 1916. The district consists of Capiz's capital city of Roxas and adjacent municipalities of Maayon, Panay, Panitan, Pilar, Pontevedra and President Roxas. It is currently represented in the 20th Congress by Howard Guintu, an independent.

The district served as an electoral district in the 1934 Constitutional Convention and in the 1971 Constitutional Convention, electing two delegates in each.

The district had been a safe seat for the Liberal Party. Whenever the district is contested in an election, it has been held by the party since its foundation in 1946, except from 1953 to 1957, until 2025. In the 2025 elections, none of the contesting candidates were from the Liberal Party.

== List of members representing the district ==
=== Philippine Assembly (1907–1916) ===
Portrait	Member (Lifespan)	Term of office	Party	Legislature	Electoral history	Constituencies
District created January 9, 1907.
	Eugenio Picazo (1873–1931)	October 16, 1907 – October 16, 1909	Independent	1st Legislature	Elected in 1907.	1907–1909; Capiz, Dao, Panay, Panitan, Pilar, Pontevedra
	Rafael Acuña (1874–1945)	October 16, 1909 – October 16, 1916	Nacionalista	2nd Legislature	Elected in 1909.	1909–1916; Capiz, Dao, Dumarao, Ivisan, Panay, Panitan, Pilar, Pontevedra, Sigma
	Rafael Acuña (1874–1945)	October 16, 1909 – October 16, 1916	Nacionalista	3rd Legislature	Re-elected in 1912.	1909–1916; Capiz, Dao, Dumarao, Ivisan, Panay, Panitan, Pilar, Pontevedra, Sigma

=== House of Representatives (1916–1935) ===
Portrait	Member (Lifespan)	Term of office	Party	Legislature	Electoral history	Constituencies
	Antonio Belo (1877–1944)	October 16, 1916 – June 3, 1919	Nacionalista	4th Legislature	Elected in 1916.	1916–1919; Capiz, Dao, Dumarao, Ivisan, Panay, Panitan, Pilar, Pontevedra, Sigma
	Antonio Habana	June 3, 1919 – June 6, 1922	Nacionalista	5th Legislature	Elected in 1919.	1919–1935; Capiz, Dao, Dumarao, Ivisan, Panay, Panitan, Pilar, Pontevedra
	Manuel Roxas (1872–1948)	June 6, 1922 – November 15, 1935	Nacionalista Colectivista	6th Legislature	Elected in 1922.	1919–1935; Capiz, Dao, Dumarao, Ivisan, Panay, Panitan, Pilar, Pontevedra
	Manuel Roxas (1872–1948)	June 6, 1922 – November 15, 1935	Nacionalista Consolidado	7th Legislature	Re-elected in 1925.	1919–1935; Capiz, Dao, Dumarao, Ivisan, Panay, Panitan, Pilar, Pontevedra
	Manuel Roxas (1872–1948)	June 6, 1922 – November 15, 1935	Nacionalista Consolidado	8th Legislature	Re-elected in 1928.	1919–1935; Capiz, Dao, Dumarao, Ivisan, Panay, Panitan, Pilar, Pontevedra
	Manuel Roxas (1872–1948)	June 6, 1922 – November 15, 1935	Nacionalista Consolidado	9th Legislature	Re-elected in 1931.	1919–1935; Capiz, Dao, Dumarao, Ivisan, Panay, Panitan, Pilar, Pontevedra
	Manuel Roxas (1872–1948)	June 6, 1922 – November 15, 1935	Nacionalista Democrata Pro-Independencia	10th Legislature	Re-elected in 1934.	1919–1935; Capiz, Dao, Dumarao, Ivisan, Panay, Panitan, Pilar, Pontevedra

=== 1934 Constitutional Convention (1934–1935) ===
Seat A					Seat B					Legislature	Constituencies
Portrait	Member (Lifespan)	Term of office	Party	Electoral history	Portrait	Member (Lifespan)	Term of office	Party	Electoral history	Legislature	Constituencies
	Jose Altavas (1877–1952)	July 30, 1934 – February 19, 1935	Nonpartisan	Elected in 1934.		Manuel Roxas (1872–1948)	July 30, 1934 – February 19, 1935	Nonpartisan	Elected in 1934.	1934 Constitutional Convention	1934–1935; Capiz, Dao, Dumarao, Ivisan, Panay, Panitan, Pilar, Pontevedra

=== National Assembly (1935–1945) ===
==== Commonwealth ====
Portrait	Member (Lifespan)	Term of office	Party	Legislature	Electoral history	Constituencies
	Manuel Roxas (1872–1948)	November 15, 1935 – December 30, 1938	Nacionalista Democrata Pro-Independencia	1st National Assembly	Re-elected in 1935.	1935–1938; Capiz, Dao, Dumarao, Ivisan, Panay, Panitan, Pilar, Pontevedra
	Ramon Arnaldo	December 30, 1938 – December 30, 1941	Nacionalista	2nd National Assembly	Elected in 1938.	1938–1941; Capiz, Cuartero, Dao, Dumarao, Ivisan, Panay, Panitan, Pilar, Pontevedra
District dissolved into the two-seat Cebu's at-large district for the Second Republic National Assembly.

=== House of Representatives (1945–1973) ===
Portrait	Member (Lifespan)	Term of office	Party	Legislature	Electoral history	Constituencies
District re-created May 24, 1945.
	Ramon Arnaldo	June 9, 1945 – December 30, 1953	Nacionalista	1st Commonwealth Congress	Re-elected in 1941.	1945–1949; Capiz, Cuartero, Dao, Dumarao, Ivisan, Panay, Panitan, Pilar, Pontevedra
	Ramon Arnaldo	June 9, 1945 – December 30, 1953	Liberal	2nd Commonwealth Congress	Re-elected in 1946.	1945–1949; Capiz, Cuartero, Dao, Dumarao, Ivisan, Panay, Panitan, Pilar, Pontevedra
	Ramon Arnaldo	June 9, 1945 – December 30, 1953	Liberal	1st Congress	Re-elected in 1946.	1945–1949; Capiz, Cuartero, Dao, Dumarao, Ivisan, Panay, Panitan, Pilar, Pontevedra
	Ramon Arnaldo	June 9, 1945 – December 30, 1953	Liberal	2nd Congress	Re-elected in 1949.	1949–1953; Capiz, Cuartero, Dao, Dumarao, Ivisan, Panay, Panitan, Pilar, Pontevedra, President Roxas
	Carmen Consing	December 30, 1953 – December 30, 1957	Nacionalista	3rd Congress	Elected in 1953.	1953–1957; Cuartero, Dao, Dumarao, Ivisan, Panay, Panitan, Pilar, Pontevedra, President Roxas, Roxas
	Gerardo Roxas (1924–1982)	December 30, 1957 – November 12, 1963	Liberal	4th Congress	Elected in 1957.	1957–1973; Cuartero, Dao, Dumarao, Ivisan, Maayon, Panay, Panitan, Pilar, Pontevedra, President Roxas, Roxas
	Gerardo Roxas (1924–1982)	December 30, 1957 – November 12, 1963	Liberal	5th Congress	Re-elected in 1961. Resigned on election as senator.	1957–1973; Cuartero, Dao, Dumarao, Ivisan, Maayon, Panay, Panitan, Pilar, Pontevedra, President Roxas, Roxas
Vacant (November 12, 1963 – December 30, 1965)				5th Congress	No special election held to fill vacancy.	1957–1973; Cuartero, Dao, Dumarao, Ivisan, Maayon, Panay, Panitan, Pilar, Pontevedra, President Roxas, Roxas
	Mariano Acuña (1911–1992)	December 30, 1965 – December 30, 1969	Liberal	6th Congress	Elected in 1965.	1957–1973; Cuartero, Dao, Dumarao, Ivisan, Maayon, Panay, Panitan, Pilar, Pontevedra, President Roxas, Roxas
	Juliano Alba	December 30, 1969 – January 17, 1973	Liberal	7th Congress	Elected in 1969. Term cut short upon the ratification of a new Constitution.	1957–1973; Cuartero, Dao, Dumarao, Ivisan, Maayon, Panay, Panitan, Pilar, Pontevedra, President Roxas, Roxas
District dissolved into the sixteen-seat Region VI's at-large district for the Interim Batasang Pambansa, followed by the two-seat Capiz's at-large district for the Regular Batasang Pambansa.

=== 1971 Constitutional Convention (1971–1972) ===
Seat A					Seat B					Legislature	Constituencies
Portrait	Member (Lifespan)	Term of office	Party	Electoral history	Portrait	Member (Lifespan)	Term of office	Party	Electoral history	Legislature	Constituencies
	Enrique Belo (1922–2004)	June 1, 1971 – November 29, 1972	Nonpartisan	Elected in 1970.		George Viterbo	June 1, 1971 – November 29, 1972	Nonpartisan	Elected in 1970.	1971 Constitutional Convention	1971–1972; Cuartero, Dao, Dumarao, Ivisan, Maayon, Panay, Panitan, Pilar, Pontevedra, President Roxas, Roxas

=== House of Representatives (1987–present) ===
Portrait	Member (Lifespan)	Term of office	Party	Legislature	Electoral history	Constituencies
District re-created February 2, 1987.
	Gerardo Roxas Jr. (1960–1993)	June 30, 1987 – April 4, 1993	Liberal	8th Congress	Elected in 1987.	1987–present Maayon, Panay, Panitan, Pilar, Pontevedra, President Roxas, Roxas
	Gerardo Roxas Jr. (1960–1993)	June 30, 1987 – April 4, 1993	Liberal	9th Congress	Re-elected in 1992. Died.	1987–present Maayon, Panay, Panitan, Pilar, Pontevedra, President Roxas, Roxas
Vacant (April 4 – September 1, 1993)				9th Congress	—	1987–present Maayon, Panay, Panitan, Pilar, Pontevedra, President Roxas, Roxas
	Mar Roxas (born 1957)	September 1, 1993 – January 2, 2000	Liberal	9th Congress	Elected in 1993 to finish his brother's term.	1987–present Maayon, Panay, Panitan, Pilar, Pontevedra, President Roxas, Roxas
	Mar Roxas (born 1957)	September 1, 1993 – January 2, 2000	Liberal	10th Congress	Re-elected in 1995.	1987–present Maayon, Panay, Panitan, Pilar, Pontevedra, President Roxas, Roxas
	Mar Roxas (born 1957)	September 1, 1993 – January 2, 2000	Liberal	11th Congress	Re-elected in 1998. Resigned on appointment as Secretary of Trade and Industry.	1987–present Maayon, Panay, Panitan, Pilar, Pontevedra, President Roxas, Roxas
Vacant (January 2, 2000 – June 30, 2001)				11th Congress	No special election held to fill vacancy.	1987–present Maayon, Panay, Panitan, Pilar, Pontevedra, President Roxas, Roxas
	Rodriguez Dadivas	June 30, 2001 – June 30, 2007	Liberal	12th Congress	Elected in 2001.	1987–present Maayon, Panay, Panitan, Pilar, Pontevedra, President Roxas, Roxas
	Rodriguez Dadivas	June 30, 2001 – June 30, 2007	Liberal	13th Congress	Re-elected in 2004.	1987–present Maayon, Panay, Panitan, Pilar, Pontevedra, President Roxas, Roxas
	Antonio del Rosario (born 1946)	June 30, 2007 – June 30, 2016	Liberal	14th Congress	Elected in 2007.	1987–present Maayon, Panay, Panitan, Pilar, Pontevedra, President Roxas, Roxas
	Antonio del Rosario (born 1946)	June 30, 2007 – June 30, 2016	Liberal	15th Congress	Re-elected in 2010.	1987–present Maayon, Panay, Panitan, Pilar, Pontevedra, President Roxas, Roxas
	Antonio del Rosario (born 1946)	June 30, 2007 – June 30, 2016	Liberal	16th Congress	Re-elected in 2013.	1987–present Maayon, Panay, Panitan, Pilar, Pontevedra, President Roxas, Roxas
	Tawi Billones (born 1946)	June 30, 2016 – June 30, 2025	Liberal	17th Congress	Elected in 2016.	1987–present Maayon, Panay, Panitan, Pilar, Pontevedra, President Roxas, Roxas
	Tawi Billones (born 1946)	June 30, 2016 – June 30, 2025	Liberal	18th Congress	Re-elected in 2019.	1987–present Maayon, Panay, Panitan, Pilar, Pontevedra, President Roxas, Roxas
	Tawi Billones (born 1946)	June 30, 2016 – June 30, 2025	Liberal	19th Congress	Re-elected in 2022.	1987–present Maayon, Panay, Panitan, Pilar, Pontevedra, President Roxas, Roxas
	Howard Guintu (born 1988)	June 30, 2025 – present	Independent	20th Congress	Elected in 2025.	1987–present Maayon, Panay, Panitan, Pilar, Pontevedra, President Roxas, Roxas

== Election results ==
=== 1993 special ===
1993 House of Representatives special election in Capiz's 1st district
Party	Candidate	Votes	%
Liberal	Mar Roxas	67,688	100.00
Total votes		67,688	100.00
Liberal hold			

=== 2010 ===
2010 Philippine House of Representatives elections in Capiz
Party	Candidate	Votes	%
Liberal	Antonio del Rosario (incumbent)	77,584	46.72
Ugyon Kita Capiz	Felipe Barredo	45,859	27.62
Independent	Rodriguez Dadivas	41,205	24.82
Independent	Conrado Tinsay II	1,397	0.84
Valid ballots		166,045	92.87
Invalid or blank votes		12,752	7.13
Total votes		178,797	100.00
Liberal hold			

=== 2013 ===
2013 Philippine House of Representatives elections
Party	Candidate	Votes	%
Liberal	Antonio del Rosario (incumbent)	100,675	78.42
NUP	Jesus Maria Jose Avelino	22,684	17.67
Independent	Conrado Tinsay	2,894	2.25
Independent	Zinon Amoroso	2,131	1.66
Valid ballots		128,384	76.12
Invalid or blank votes		40,271	23.88
Total votes		168,655	100.00
Liberal hold			

=== 2016 ===
2016 Philippine House of Representatives elections
Party	Candidate	Votes	%
Liberal	Tawi Billones	103,872	78.39
UNA	Medardo Pestaño	28,639	21.61
Valid ballots		132,511	66.05
Invalid or blank votes		68,110	33.95
Total votes		200,621	100.00
Liberal hold			

=== 2019 ===
2019 Philippine House of Representatives elections
Party	Candidate	Votes	%
Liberal	Tawi Billones (incumbent)	87,905	54.58
UNA	Gingging Perez Almalbis	62,374	38.72
PFP	Ruth Dinglasan	6,929	4.30
PDDS	Marcelo Barruela Jr.	3,862	2.40
Total votes		161,070	100.00
Liberal hold			

=== 2022 ===
2022 Philippine House of Representatives elections
Party	Candidate	Votes	%
Liberal	Tawi Billones (incumbent)	110,349	53.15
PDP–Laban	Esteban Evan Contreras	54,558	26.28
PRP	Engineer Agana	42,726	20.58
Total votes		207,633	100.00
Liberal hold			

=== 2025 ===
2025 Philippine House of Representatives elections in Capiz
Party	Candidate	Votes	%
Independent	Howard Guintu	131,545	54.63
1-Capiz	Paolo Roxas	109,249	45.37
Total votes		240,794	100.00
Independent gain from Liberal			

== See also ==
- Legislative districts of Capiz

House of Representatives of the Philippines
Preceded by Cebu's 2nd congressional district	Home district of the speaker of the House of Representatives; October 27, 1922 – May 5, 1934	Succeeded by Abra's at-large congressional district
