= Capiznon language =

Austronesian language spoken in the Philippines

Capiznon
- Capiceño
- Binisaya, Binisaya nga Capiznon, Bisaya
- Native to: Philippines
- Region: Capiz and some portions of Iloilo, Aklan, Masbate, and Romblon
- Ethnicity: Capiznon
- Native speakers: 710,000 (2010)
- Language family: Austronesian: Malayo-Polynesian; Philippine; Central Philippine; Bisayan; Central Bisayan; Capiznon

Language codes
- ISO 639-3: cps
- Glottolog: capi1239
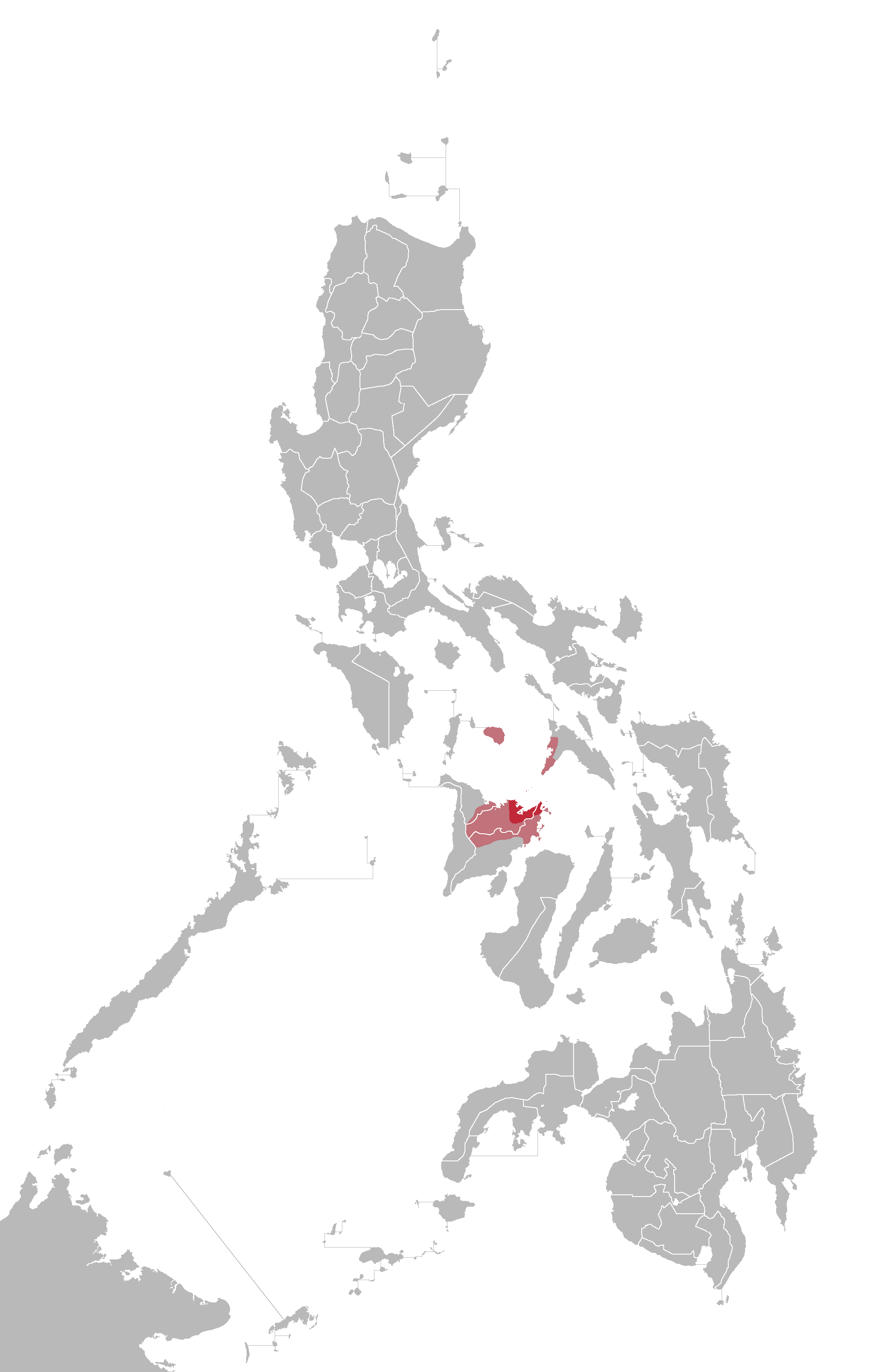
- Area where Capiznon is spoken

Capiznon or Capiceño (Bisaya nga Kinapisnon) is an Austronesian regional language spoken in Western Visayas in the Philippines. Capiznon is concentrated in the province of Capiz in the northeast of Panay Island. It is a member of the Bisayan language family and the people are part of the wider Visayan ethnolinguistic group, who constitute the largest Filipino ethnolinguistic group. The language is often confused with Hiligaynon due to dialectological comprehension similarities and as high as 91% mutual intelligibility, but it has a certain unique accent and vocabulary that integrates Aklanon and Waray lexicon. Despite its distinct corruption of Hiligaynon lateral approximants, a prevalent feature among rural farmers, ethnic convergence and cosmopolitanism has led to a shift back to the purely Hiligaynon prosodic form of slower tonality and softer and longer vowels, most particularly among the younger generations.

== Distribution ==
Capiznon is spoken in the following municipalities:

Capiz

- Roxas City
- Ivisan
- Panay
- Panitan
- Maayon
- Dao
- Pilar
- Mambusao
- Pontevedra
- President Roxas
- Sapi-an
- Sigma
- Cuartero
- Dumarao
- Dumalag
- Jamindan
- Tapaz

Iloilo

- Batad
- Calinog
- Bingawan
- Lemery
- Passi City
- Lambunao
- Carles
- Estancia
- Sara
- San Rafael
- Concepcion
- San Dionisio
- Balasan
- San Enrique
- Ajuy

Aklan

- Altavas
- Batan
- Balete
- Libacao

Masbate

- Balud
- Mandaon

Romblon

- Cajidiocan
- Magdiwang
- San Fernando

== Phonology ==
=== Consonants ===
		Labial	Dental/ Alveolar	Palatal	Velar	Glottal
Plosive	voiceless	p	t		k	ʔ
Plosive	voiced	b	d		ɡ	
Nasal		m	n		ŋ	
Fricative			s			h
Rhotic			r			
Lateral			l			
Approximant		w		j		

=== Vowels ===
	Front	Central	Back
Close	i		ʊ ~ u
Open		a	

/ʊ/ can range from [ʊ] to [u].

== Common lexical differences between Capiznon and Hiligaynon languages ==
Capiznon	Hiligaynon	English
yanda	subong	today/now
ini/mini/muni	ini/amo ini/amo ni	this
ina/mina/muna	ina/amo ina	that/these is ours
patawa	kadlaw	laugh
palataw-an	kaladlawan	funny
idot/itot	iyot	sex
malukong	yahong	bowl
ti-aw/dinaskal	lango-lango	joke
palanggana	labador	washbasin
pawa	sanag	bright/luminous
wakal/hala/hambal	hambal/siling	talk
lagbong/hulog	hulog	fall
puya	bata	child
pilaw	tuyo	sleepy
tamarindo	sambag	tamarind tree
tangis	hibi	cry
laong	pahanugot/lisensya	consent
samad	guba	to break/broken
siki	tiil	foot
mayad	maayo	fine/good
gutos	lakat/baktas	to travel by foot
gumangkon	hinablos	nephew/niece
libod	lagaw	to stroll around
hamyang	haya	wake
umog	lagu	used and unwashed clothes
hinipo	agot	youngest child
talisik/panalisik	taliti/panaliti	drizzle/drizzling
pinsan	tingub	together
sanduko	binangon	bolo
dalunggan	dulunggan	ears
kuracha	tanga	cockroach
sudlay	husay	comb
pinaisan	pinamalhan	marinated fish
bundol	mango	dumb
lupos	subak	ingredient
dayok	ginamos	shrimp paste
sim	sim	tin roof
hay!	te!	see!
sili	katumbal	chilli pepper
paukoy/pahimuyong	pahimunong	quiet
latoy	balatong	string beans
daha	tig-ang	to cook rice
lurop	sirop	to dive underwater
luyo	tupad/ingod	adjacent
dulog	hulid	to sleep together
uyapad	uma	ricefield
migo/miga	uyab	boyfriend/girlfriend
mayad	maayo	good
mayad	pali	healed/cured
unlan	ulunan/ulonan	pillow
habukon	palak-palak/tikalon	boastful/arrogant

== See also ==
- Hiligaynon language
- Roxas City
- Capiz
- Capiznon people
