= Pilar, Capiz =

Municipality in Capiz, Philippines

Pilar
- Municipality
- Municipality of Pilar
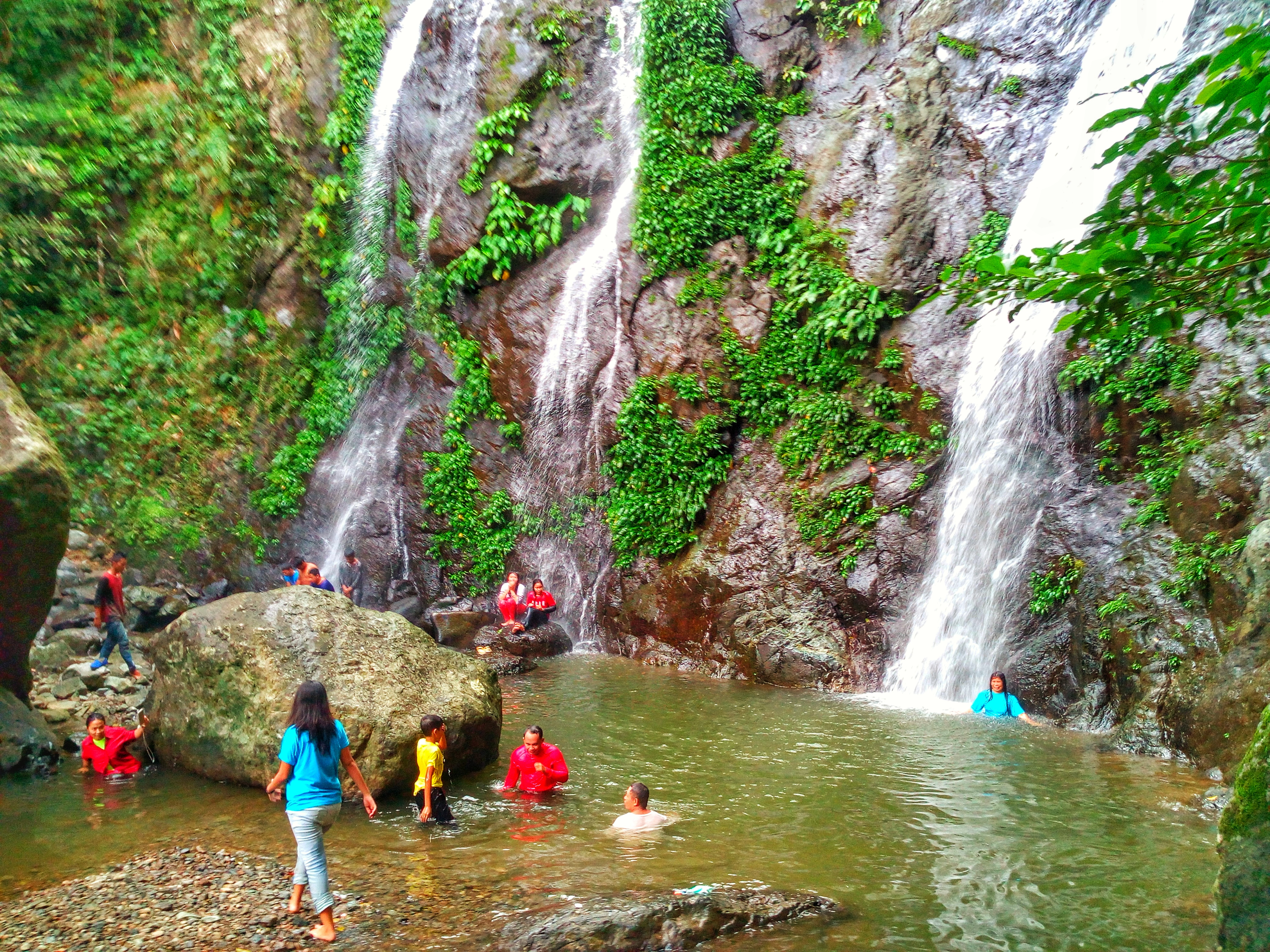
- Hinulugan Falls

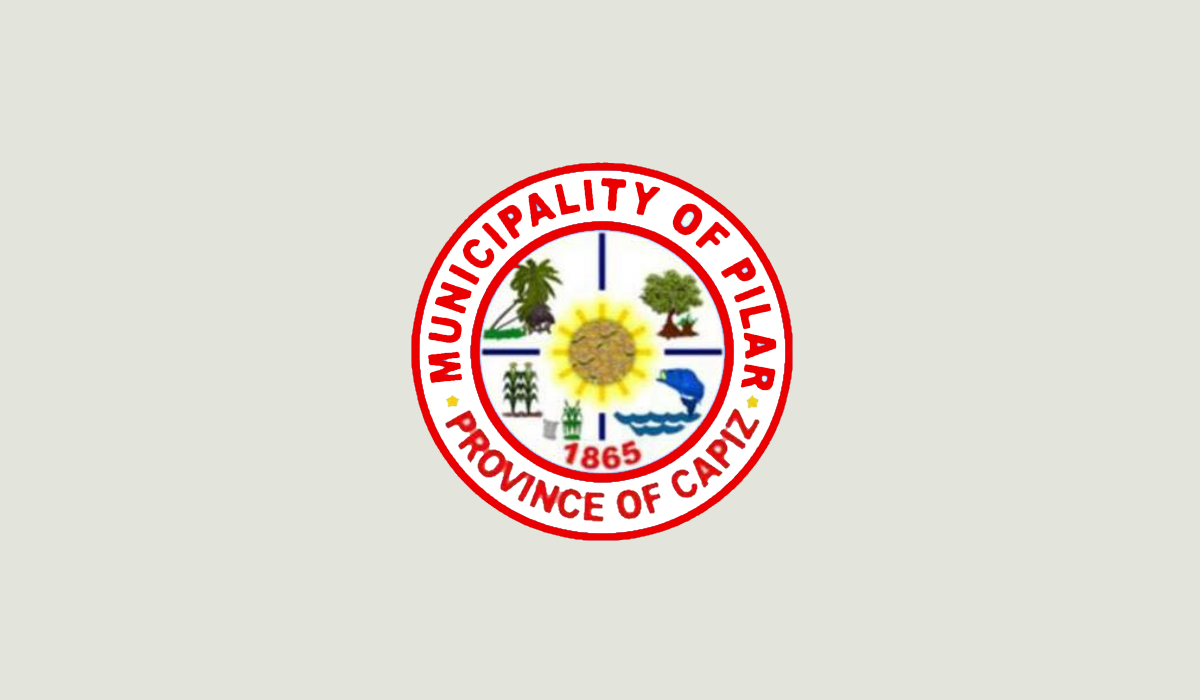
- Flag
- Etymology: Sibala
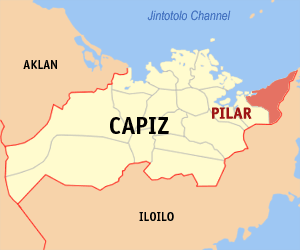
- Map of Capiz with Pilar highlighted
- Interactive map of Pilar
- Location within the Philippines
- Coordinates: 11°29′16″N 122°59′44″E
- Country: Philippines
- Region: Western Visayas
- Province: Capiz
- District: 1st district
- Barangays: 24 (see Barangays)

Government
  - Type: Sangguniang Bayan
  - Mayor: Arnold A. Perez (PFP)
  - Vice Mayor: Antonio L. Bargo, Jr. (PFP)
  - Representative: Ivan Howard A. Guintu (IND)
  - Municipal Council: Members: Jenboy B. Borgonia; Ian A. Perez; Aldo M. Cuñada; Dorothy A. Cantiller; Fernando R. Pastrana; Ruby B. Patricio; Rodgel V. Besaña; Marlene B. Baniel
  - Electorate: 29,585 voters (2025)

Area
  - Total: 77.99 km^{2} (30.11 sq mi)
- Elevation: 34 m (112 ft)
- Highest elevation: 812 m (2,664 ft)
- Lowest elevation: −1 m (−3.3 ft)

Population (2024 census)
  - Total: 48,789
  - Density: 625.6/km^{2} (1,620/sq mi)
  - Households: 12,254

Economy
  - Income class: 2nd municipal income class
  - Poverty incidence: 19.06% (2023)
  - Revenue: ₱ 186.4 million (2024)
  - Assets: ₱ 577.2 million (2024)
  - Expenditure: ₱ 80.99 million (2024)
  - Liabilities: ₱ 66.34 million (2024)

Service provider
  - Electricity: Capiz Electric Cooperative (CAPELCO)
- Time zone: UTC+8 (PST)
- ZIP code: 5804
- PSGC: 061911000
- IDD : area code: +63 (0)36
- Native languages: Capisnon; Hiligaynon; Tagalog
- Website: pilar-capiz.gov.ph

Pilar, officially the Municipality of Pilar (Capiznon/Hiligaynon: Banwa sang Pilar; Tagalog: Bayan ng Pilar), is a municipality in the province of Capiz, Philippines. According to the 2024 census, it has a population of 48,789 people.

== History ==
The coastal town sprang out from an Austronesian settlement in the early 16th century when indio natives managed to escape oppression from Spanish colonial authorities. The settlement was then known as Sibala, named after the river that ran through the coastal village. In 1570, however, the settlement was seized by Spanish forces and the guardia civil took full control of the village fortifying it with a military garrison. It later flourished into a bigger town and was renamed after its designated patron La Nuestra Señora del Pilar (Our Lady of the Pillar). In the 18th century, it adopted the (Holy Trinity) La Santisima Trinidad as its municipal patron after a wooden image of the Holy Trinity from the wreckage of a Spanish galleon ship en route from Mexico was found in the town's coastline. Augustinian friars were initially assigned to preach in the town since then until it would later receive its permanent parish priest and Roman Catholic Church.

In 1897, there had been an armed insurgency known as the Battle of Balisong during the Philippine Revolution in an attempt to overthrow Spanish authorities in the municipality led by local revolutionaries with the support of other resistance groups in Capiz, namely from the neighboring towns of Pan-ay and Pontevedra.

In 1949, the sitios and barrios of Aranguel, Culilang, Pandan, Pinamihagan, Cadoulan, Quiajo, Sangcal, Pondol, Marita, Madulano, Jabuyana, Bo-ac, Cabugcabug, Goce Badiangon, Bayuyan, Agbobolo, Cubay, Ibaca, and the sitio of Lotudlotud, which was converted into a barrio of Elizalde, were separated from the municipal jurisdiction of Pilar to form a separate town, namely President Roxas, by virtue of Republic Act No. 374.

== Geography ==
Pilar is 51 kilometres (32 mi) from Roxas City.

=== Barangays ===
Pilar is politically subdivided into 24 barangays. Each barangay consists of puroks and some have sitios.

- Balogo
- Binaobawan
- Blasco
- Casanayan
- Cayus
- Dayhagan
- Dulangan
- Monteflor
- Natividad
- Olalo
- Poblacion
- Rosario
- San Antonio
- San Blas
- San Esteban
- San Fernando
- San Nicolas
- San Pedro
- San Ramon
- San Silvestre
- Sinamongan
- Santa Fe
- Tabun-acan
- Yating

=== Climate ===
Climate data for Pilar, Capiz
Month	Jan	Feb	Mar	Apr	May	Jun	Jul	Aug	Sep	Oct	Nov	Dec	Year
Mean daily maximum °C (°F)	27 (81)	28 (82)	29 (84)	31 (88)	32 (90)	31 (88)	30 (86)	30 (86)	29 (84)	29 (84)	29 (84)	27 (81)	29 (85)
Mean daily minimum °C (°F)	23 (73)	23 (73)	23 (73)	24 (75)	25 (77)	25 (77)	24 (75)	24 (75)	24 (75)	24 (75)	24 (75)	23 (73)	24 (75)
Average precipitation mm (inches)	61 (2.4)	39 (1.5)	46 (1.8)	48 (1.9)	90 (3.5)	144 (5.7)	152 (6.0)	145 (5.7)	163 (6.4)	160 (6.3)	120 (4.7)	90 (3.5)	1,258 (49.4)
Average rainy days	12.3	9.0	9.9	10.0	18.5	25.0	27.4	26.0	25.9	24.9	17.9	14.2	221
Source: Meteoblue

== Demographics ==
Population census of Pilar
Year	Pop.	±% p.a.
1903	7,038	—
1918	11,830	+3.52%
1939	22,301	+3.07%
1948	25,720	+1.60%
1960	19,350	−2.34%
1970	24,573	+2.42%
1975	28,589	+3.08%
1980	30,104	+1.04%
1990	35,929	+1.78%
1995	36,464	+0.28%
2000	38,903	+1.40%
2007	40,912	+0.70%
2010	41,572	+0.58%
2015	45,287	+1.64%
2020	47,100	+0.83%
2024	48,789	+0.85%
Source: Philippine Statistics Authority

In the 2024 census, the population of Pilar, Capiz, was 48,789 people, with a density of 630 inhabitants per square kilometre or 1,600 inhabitants per square mile.

Most of the town's population are made up by Austronesian descendants, such as Capiznon and Hiligaynon, followed by Aetas and a few of Chinese and Spanish ancestry.

== Economy ==
Poverty incidence of Pilar (%)

Source: Philippine Statistics Authority

Pilar has an income classification of third class. Development in basic infrastructure has been stagnant during the last decades. Annual income is low and poverty rates are said to be high, although the town has also seen greater years. The rural municipality is said to be rich in natural resources such as aquatic and mineral wealth. It used to be a strong seafood producer in the province and once even possessed its own sugar and mining industry.

Major agricultural produce of the town include fish, prawn, crab, rice, sugar, cattle and poultry. Other notable industries include shell craft and wood furniture.

== Culture ==
Roman Catholicism combined with indigenous superstitious traditions have a strong imprint on the town's local culture.

An iconic 70 foot landmark of the Virgin Mary is visible at a mountaintop in Barangay Dulangan, built by the Agtalin Shrine Foundation. A mass is held every first saturday of the month and flocked by thousands of devotees.

The town celebrates its annual feast along with the coming of the sacred Santisima Trinidad (The Holy Trinity), an early 18th-century wooden figurine from Mexico found by local fishermen in the shores of the town during the British invasion of the Philippines in 1762. The figurine is believed to have been brought over by a galleon trading ship from the port of Acapulco, Mexico, but destroyed by British warships on its route to Luzon and was washed off to the coast of Pilar. It is on display in the altar of the town's church, the Parish of the Most Holy Trinity.

The barangays of Dulangan and Casanayan are known to be the satellite villages of the municipality.

The town is also known for its oral folklore and supernatural practices. The Legend of the Golden Ship, said to be a trading ship owned by deities that docks on the town's coast en route to a parallel world, and the Balisong Caves, said to be inhabited by fairies that are highly territorial, are popular stories that have been passed down for generations.

Barangay Casanayan is home to the mummified corpse of Lola Bebe or Maria de Juan Basañes, a migrant from Cavite who married a town local but died from heart attack in 1929 only to be found fully intact in her grave several decades later. The cadaver is believed to be miraculous as it has healed many residents from illness and is preserved by family descendants for public viewing.

== Education ==
The Pilar Schools District Office governs all educational institutions within the municipality. It oversees the management and operations of all private and public, from primary to secondary schools.

Primary and elementary schools

- Binaobawan Elementary School
- Blasco Primary School
- Braulio Morgan Patricio Elementary School
- Carlos V. Lopez Elementary School
- Casanayan Elementary School
- Dulangan Elementary School
- Epifania P. Bernas Elementary School
- Golden Potters Wheel Academy
- Monteflor Elementary School
- Nuestra Señora del Pilar Parochial School
- Olalo Primary School
- Pedro A. Bernas Elementary School
- Pilar Elementary School
- Saint Vincent Ferrer Parochial School
- San Antonio Elementary School
- San Esteban Elementary School
- San Pedro Elementary School
- San Ramon Elementary School
- San Silvestre Elementary School
- Sta. Fe Elementary School
- Tabun-acan Elementary School
- Tomas Abelita Sr. Elementary School
- Valentin D. Punsalan Elementary School
- Yating Elementary School

Secondary schools

- Casanayan National High School
- Dayhagan Integrated School
- Dulangan National High School
- Guise Integrated School
- Marciano M. Patricio National High School
- San Nicolas National High School
- Sinamongan Integrated School
- Yating National High School

Higher educational institution

- Capiz State University
