= Pontevedra, Capiz =

Municipality in Capiz, Philippines

Pontevedra Caguyuman
- Municipality
- Municipality of Pontevedra
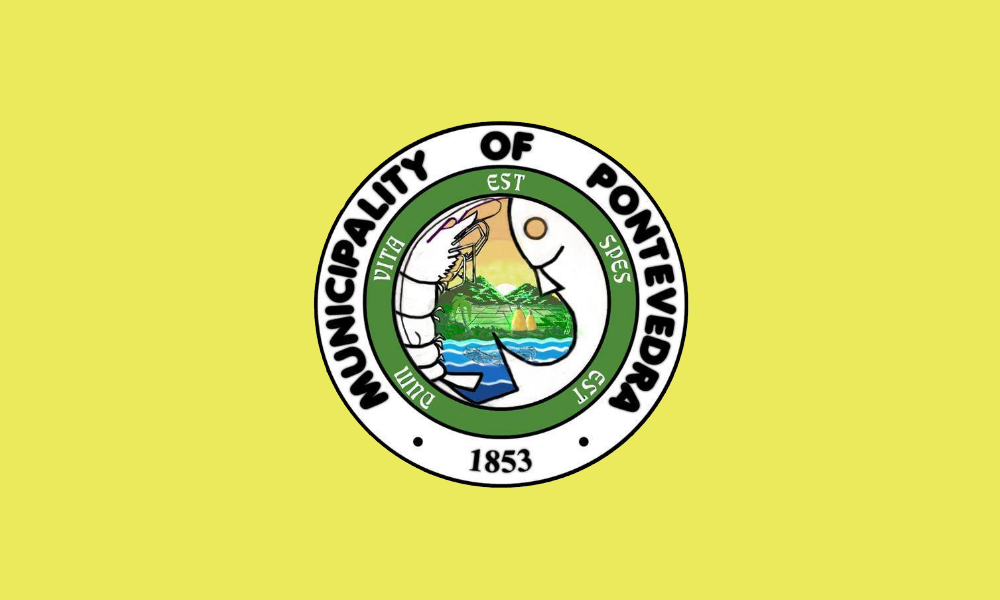
- Flag

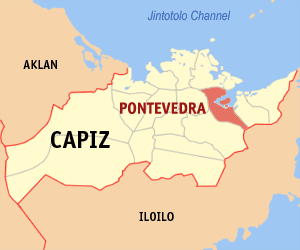
- Map of Capiz with Pontevedra highlighted
- Interactive map of Pontevedra
- Location within the Philippines
- Coordinates: 11°29′N 122°50′E
- Country: Philippines
- Region: Western Visayas
- Province: Capiz
- District: 1st district
- Founded: 1853
- Named for: Pontevedra, Spain
- Barangays: 26 (see Barangays)

Government
  - Type: Sangguniang Bayan
  - Mayor: Fermin Nemesio M. Oquendo (1Capiz)
  - Vice Mayor: Vacant
  - Representative: Ivan Howard A. Guintu (IND)
  - Municipal Council: Members: Rolindo D. Bulan; Vincent Ramil B. Bolina; Adelia B. Bajada; Hector C. Morales; Vicente C. Dangan, III; Dresden Jan T. Beldia; Klint Bernard B. Almeida; Joshua D. Dumapig
  - Electorate: 32,823 voters (2025)

Area
  - Total: 130.90 km^{2} (50.54 sq mi)
- Elevation: 8.0 m (26.2 ft)
- Highest elevation: 186 m (610 ft)
- Lowest elevation: −3 m (−9.8 ft)

Population (2024 census)
  - Total: 51,956
  - Density: 396.91/km^{2} (1,028.0/sq mi)
  - Households: 12,901

Economy
  - Income class: 1st municipal income class
  - Poverty incidence: 11.89% (2023)
  - Revenue: ₱ 16.61 million (2024)
  - Assets: ₱ 521.4 million (2024)
  - Expenditure: ₱ 60.29 million (2024)
  - Liabilities: ₱ 97.61 million (2024)

Service provider
  - Electricity: Capiz Electric Cooperative (CAPELCO)
- Time zone: UTC+8 (PST)
- ZIP code: 5802
- PSGC: 061912000
- IDD : area code: +63 (0)36
- Native languages: Capisnon; Hiligaynon; Tagalog
- Named after: Pontevedra, Spain

Pontevedra, officially the Municipality of Pontevedra (Capiznon/Hiligaynon: Banwa sang Pontevedra; Tagalog: Bayan ng Pontevedra), is a municipality in the province of Capiz, Philippines. According to the 2024 census, it has a population of 51,956 people.

== Geography ==
Pontevedra is 19 kilometres (12 mi) from Roxas City.

=== Barangays ===
Pontevedra is politically subdivided into 26 barangays. Each barangay consists of puroks and some have sitios.

- Agbanog
- Agdalipe
- Ameligan
- Bailan
- Banate
- Bantigue
- Binuntucan
- Cabugao
- Gabuc (Caugiat)
- Guba
- Hipona
- Intungcan
- Jolongajog
- Lantangan
- Linampongan
- Malag-it
- Manapao
- Ilawod (Poblacion)
- Ilaya (Poblacion)
- Rizal
- San Pedro
- Solo
- Sublangon
- Tabuc
- Tacas
- Yatingan

=== Climate ===
Climate data for Pontevedra, Capiz
Month	Jan	Feb	Mar	Apr	May	Jun	Jul	Aug	Sep	Oct	Nov	Dec	Year
Mean daily maximum °C (°F)	27 (81)	28 (82)	29 (84)	31 (88)	32 (90)	31 (88)	30 (86)	30 (86)	29 (84)	29 (84)	29 (84)	27 (81)	29 (85)
Mean daily minimum °C (°F)	23 (73)	23 (73)	23 (73)	24 (75)	25 (77)	25 (77)	24 (75)	24 (75)	24 (75)	24 (75)	24 (75)	23 (73)	24 (75)
Average precipitation mm (inches)	61 (2.4)	39 (1.5)	46 (1.8)	48 (1.9)	90 (3.5)	144 (5.7)	152 (6.0)	145 (5.7)	163 (6.4)	160 (6.3)	120 (4.7)	90 (3.5)	1,258 (49.4)
Average rainy days	12.3	9.0	9.9	10.0	18.5	25.0	27.4	26.0	25.9	24.9	17.9	14.2	221
Source: Meteoblue

== Demographics ==
Population census of Pontevedra
Year	Pop.	±% p.a.
1903	9,937	—
1918	14,932	+2.75%
1939	23,241	+2.13%
1948	26,329	+1.40%
1960	20,965	−1.88%
1970	25,314	+1.90%
1975	27,266	+1.50%
1980	30,489	+2.26%
1990	36,748	+1.89%
1995	38,223	+0.74%
2000	40,103	+1.03%
2007	42,003	+0.64%
2010	43,525	+1.30%
2015	46,428	+1.24%
2020	49,725	+1.45%
2024	51,956	+1.06%
Source: Philippine Statistics Authority

In the 2024 census, the population of Pontevedra, Capiz, was 51,956 people, with a density of 400 inhabitants per square kilometre or 1,000 inhabitants per square mile.

== Economy ==
Poverty incidence of Pontevedra (%)

Source: Philippine Statistics Authority

== Education ==
The Pontevedra Schools District Office governs all educational institutions within the municipality. It oversees the management and operations of all private and public, from primary to secondary schools.

Primary and elementary schools

- Advance Learning Academy and Tutorial Center
- Agbanog Elementary School
- Ameligan Elementary School
- Banate Elementary School
- Bible Baptist Pontevedra Pre-School
- Cabugao Primary School
- Concepcion Catalan Bisnar Elementary School
- Congressman Dinggoy Araneta Roxas Elementary School
- Councilor Nicolas Dais Elementary School
- Feliciano Consing Elementary School
- Gabuc Elementary School
- Hipona Christian School
- Hipona Elementary School
- Intongcan Elementary School
- Manapao Elementary School
- Maximo Dais Elementary School
- Pontevedra Elementary School
- Pontevedra Fundamental Baptist Academy
- Prof. Antonio Viterbo Elementary School
- Renato P. Hontiveros Elementary School
- Rizal Elementary School
- San Pedro Elementary School
- Sublangon Christian Faith Development Center
- Victoria C. Dais Elementary School

Secondary schools

- Bailan Integrated School
- Jose Diva Avelino Jr. National High School
- Pontevedra National High School

Higher educational institution

- Capiz State University
