= Panitan =

Municipality in Capiz, Philippines

Panitan Ipiong
- Municipality
- Municipality of Panitan
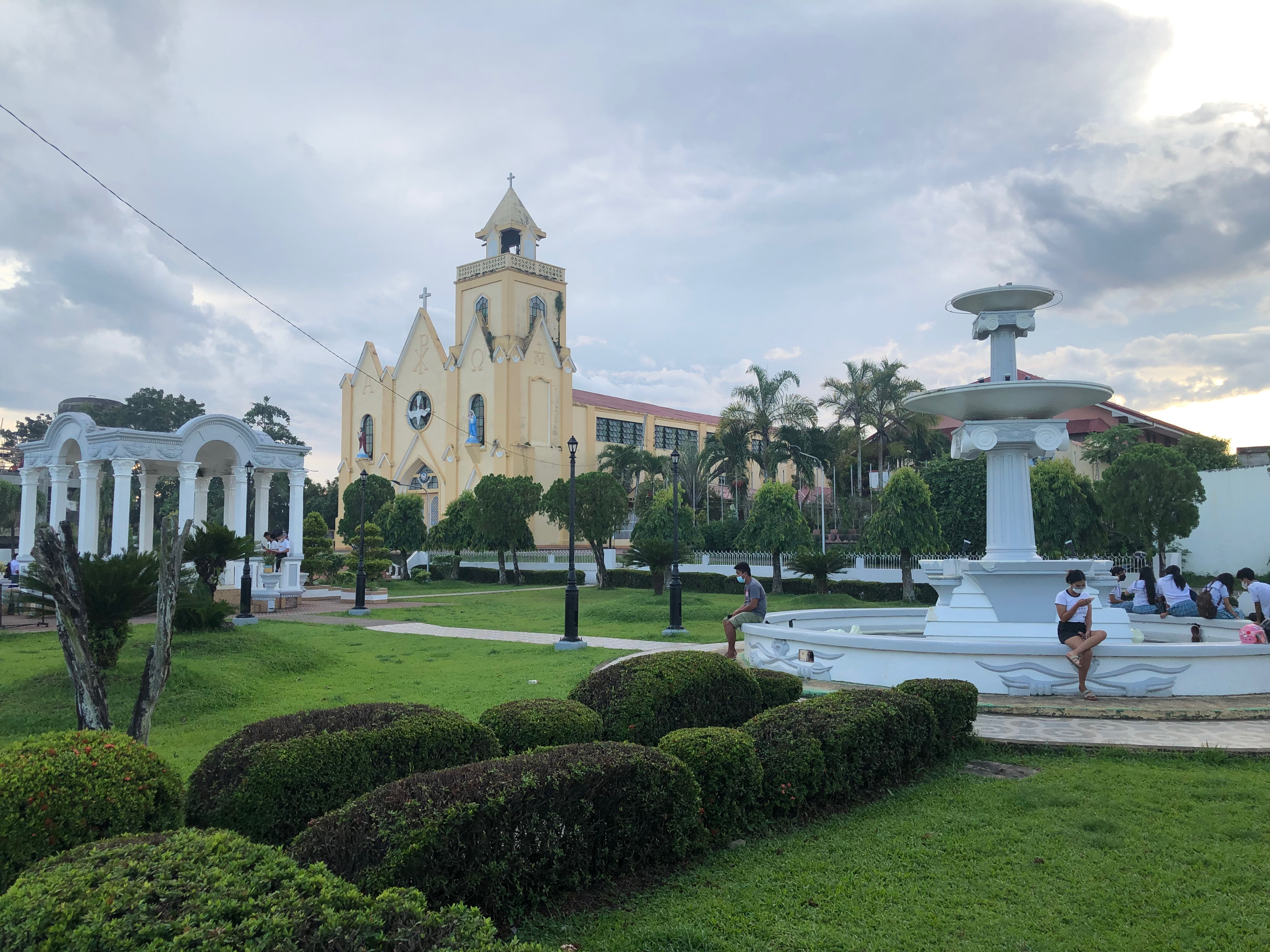
- Panitan Plaza and Saint Lawrence the Deacon Parish Church

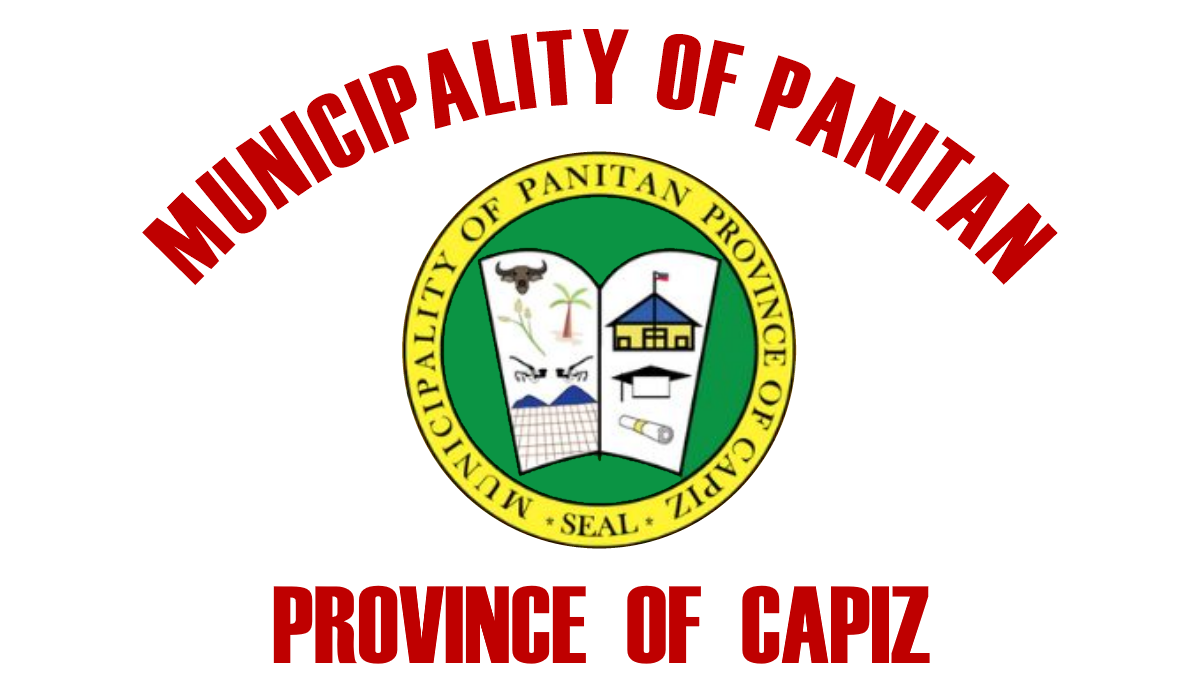
- Flag

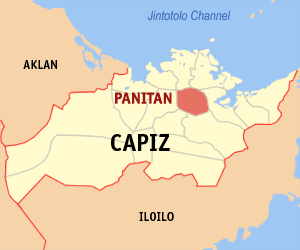
- Map of Capiz with Panitan highlighted
- Interactive map of Panitan
- Location within the Philippines
- Coordinates: 11°27′50″N 122°46′10″E
- Country: Philippines
- Region: Western Visayas
- Province: Capiz
- District: 1st district
- Founded: 1621
- Barangays: 26 (see Barangays)

Government
  - Type: Sangguniang Bayan
  - Mayor: Katherine D. Dequiña-Belo (1Capiz)
  - Vice Mayor: Audie L. Advincula (1Capiz)
  - Representative: Ivan Howard A. Guintu (IND)
  - Municipal Council: Members: Roger C. Delay; Ray D. Derramas; Agnes D. Buday; Carmelo A. Duran; Rodriguez T. Dadivas, Jr.; Marites B. Versoza; Joelito D. Denosta; Mark Anthony A. Calinao
  - Electorate: 28,181 voters (2025)

Area
  - Total: 89.88 km^{2} (34.70 sq mi)
- Elevation: 34 m (112 ft)
- Highest elevation: 338 m (1,109 ft)
- Lowest elevation: −1 m (−3.3 ft)

Population (2024 census)
  - Total: 44,246
  - Density: 492.3/km^{2} (1,275/sq mi)
  - Households: 10,868

Economy
  - Income class: 2nd municipal income class
  - Poverty incidence: 10.78% (2023)
  - Revenue: ₱ 183.3 million (2024)
  - Assets: ₱ 274.4 million (2024)
  - Expenditure: ₱ 65.74 million (2024)
  - Liabilities: ₱ 33 million (2024)

Service provider
  - Electricity: Capiz Electric Cooperative (CAPELCO)
- Time zone: UTC+8 (PST)
- ZIP code: 5815
- PSGC: 061910000
- IDD : area code: +63 (0)36
- Native languages: Capisnon; Hiligaynon; Tagalog

Panitan, officially the Municipality of Panitan (Capiznon/Hiligaynon: Banwa sang Panitan; Tagalog: Bayan ng Panitan), is a municipality in the Province of Capiz, Philippines. According to the 2024 census, it has a population of 44,246 people.

== Etymology ==
Panitan was formerly known as Ipiong or Ypiong before Spanish contact. One local account says the name Panitan came from the act of peeling tree bark for firewood, which early settlers described with the word "panit", meaning "to peel". Another explanation links the name to a local fish called apnit. Phrases referring to the fish were gradually shortened and altered in Spanish records, which led to the form Panitan.

== Geography ==
Panitan is 16 kilometres (9.9 mi) from Roxas City.

=== Barangays ===
Panitan is politically subdivided into 26 Barangays. Each barangay consists of Puroks and some have Sitios.

- Agbabadiang
- Agkilo
- Agloway
- Ambilay
- Bahit
- Balatucan
- Banga-an
- Cabugao
- Cabangahan
- Cadio
- Cala-an
- Capagao
- Cogon
- Conciencia
- Enseñagan
- Intampilan
- Pasugue
- Poblacion Ilawod
- Poblacion Ilaya
- Quios
- Salocon
- Tabuc Norte
- Tabuc Sur
- Timpas
- Tincupon
- Tinigban

=== Climate ===
Climate data for Panitan, Capiz
Month	Jan	Feb	Mar	Apr	May	Jun	Jul	Aug	Sep	Oct	Nov	Dec	Year
Mean daily maximum °C (°F)	27 (81)	28 (82)	29 (84)	31 (88)	32 (90)	31 (88)	30 (86)	30 (86)	29 (84)	29 (84)	29 (84)	27 (81)	29 (85)
Mean daily minimum °C (°F)	23 (73)	23 (73)	23 (73)	24 (75)	25 (77)	25 (77)	24 (75)	24 (75)	24 (75)	24 (75)	24 (75)	23 (73)	24 (75)
Average precipitation mm (inches)	61 (2.4)	39 (1.5)	46 (1.8)	48 (1.9)	90 (3.5)	144 (5.7)	152 (6.0)	145 (5.7)	163 (6.4)	160 (6.3)	120 (4.7)	90 (3.5)	1,258 (49.4)
Average rainy days	12.3	9.0	9.9	10.0	18.5	25.0	27.4	26.0	25.9	24.9	17.9	14.2	221
Source: Meteoblue

== Demographics ==
Population census of Panitan

Year	Pop.	±% p.a.
1903	7,578	—
1918	10,164	+1.98%
1939	14,956	+1.86%
1948	15,179	+0.16%
1960	19,828	+2.25%
1970	23,259	+1.61%
1975	26,361	+2.54%
1980	27,631	+0.95%

Year	Pop.	±% p.a.
1990	32,867	+1.75%
1995	33,269	+0.23%
2000	37,458	+2.57%
2007	38,666	+0.44%
2010	37,895	−0.73%
2015	40,289	+1.17%
2020	42,565	+1.16%
2024	44,246	+0.93%

Source: Philippine Statistics Authority

In the 2024 census, the population of Panitan was 44,246 people, with a density of 490 inhabitants per square kilometre or 1,300 inhabitants per square mile.

== Economy ==
Poverty incidence of Panitan (%)

Source: Philippine Statistics Authority

== Education ==
The Panit-an Schools District Office governs all educational institutions within the municipality. It oversees the management and operations of all private and public, from primary to secondary schools.

Primary and Elementary Schools in the Municipality of Panitan

- Agbabadiang Primary School
- Agloway Elementary School
- Agustin A. Almalbis MS
- Ambilay Elementary School
- Bahit Elementary School
- Banga-an Elementary School
- Cabangahan Elementary School
- Cabugao Elementary School
- Capagao Elementary School
- Catmon Elementary School
- Cogon Elementary School
- Conciencia Elementary School
- Daile's Franciscan Learning Institute
- Dr. Salvador Dellota Elementary School
- Jesus Gonzalo Albana Elementary School
- Maluboglubog Elementary School
- Panit-an Elementary School
- Pasugue Elementary School
- Quios Primary School
- Read and Write Pre-School and Tutorial Center
- Salocon Elementary School
- Sunshine School
- Tabuc Norte Elementary School
- Tincupon Elementary School

Secondary schools

- Antonio Belo Memorial Integrated School
- Celestino D. Diaz Integrated School
- Felixberto Dicon Dorado Sr. Integrated School
- Leodegario D. Deocampo Sr. National High School
- Panitan National High School
- Tinigban Integrated School
