= Ma-ayon =

Municipality in Capiz, Philippines

- Municipality
- Municipality of Ma-ayon
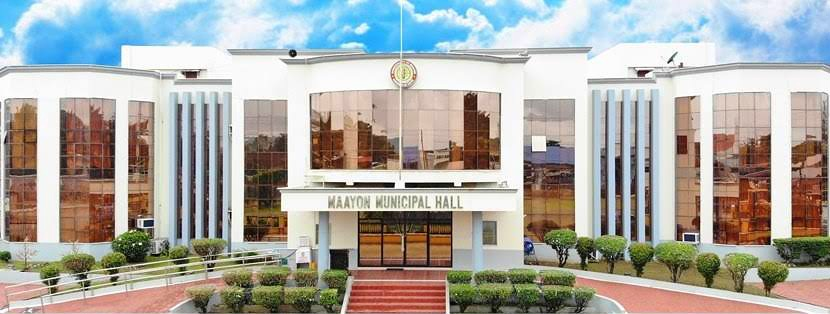

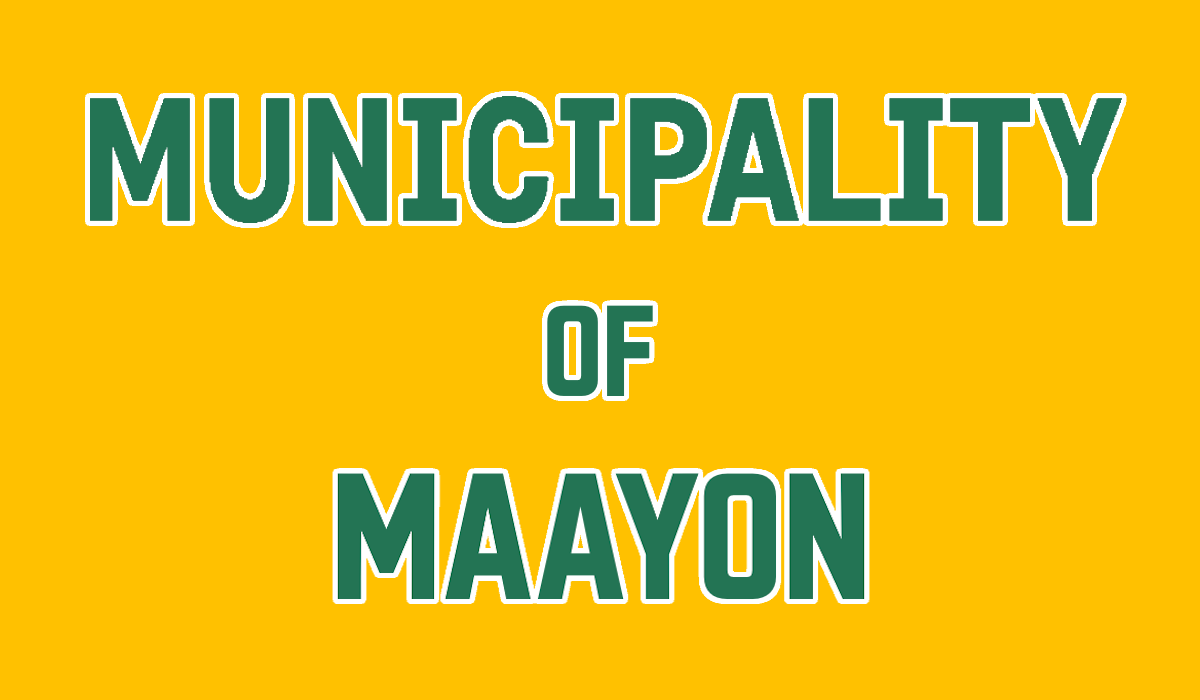
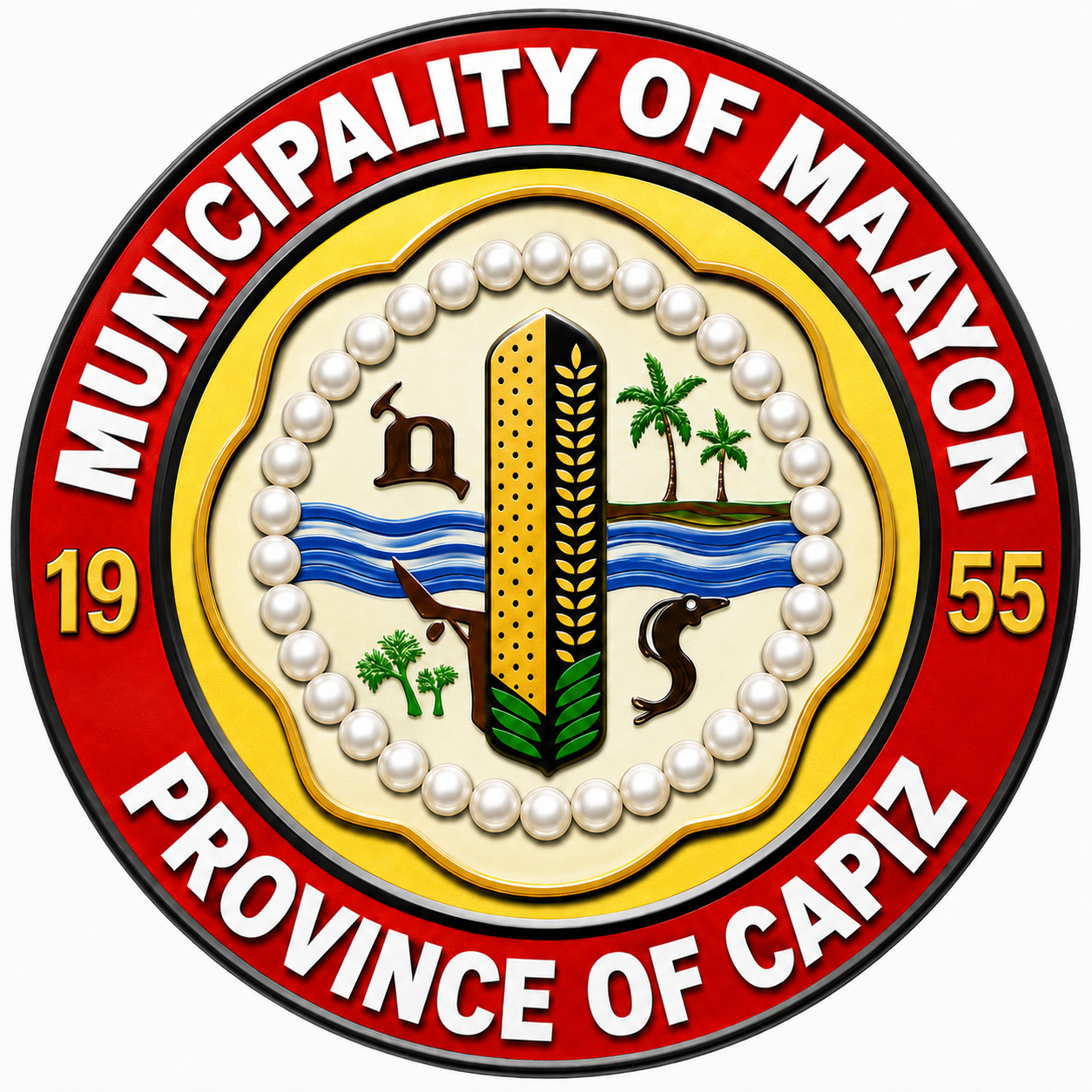
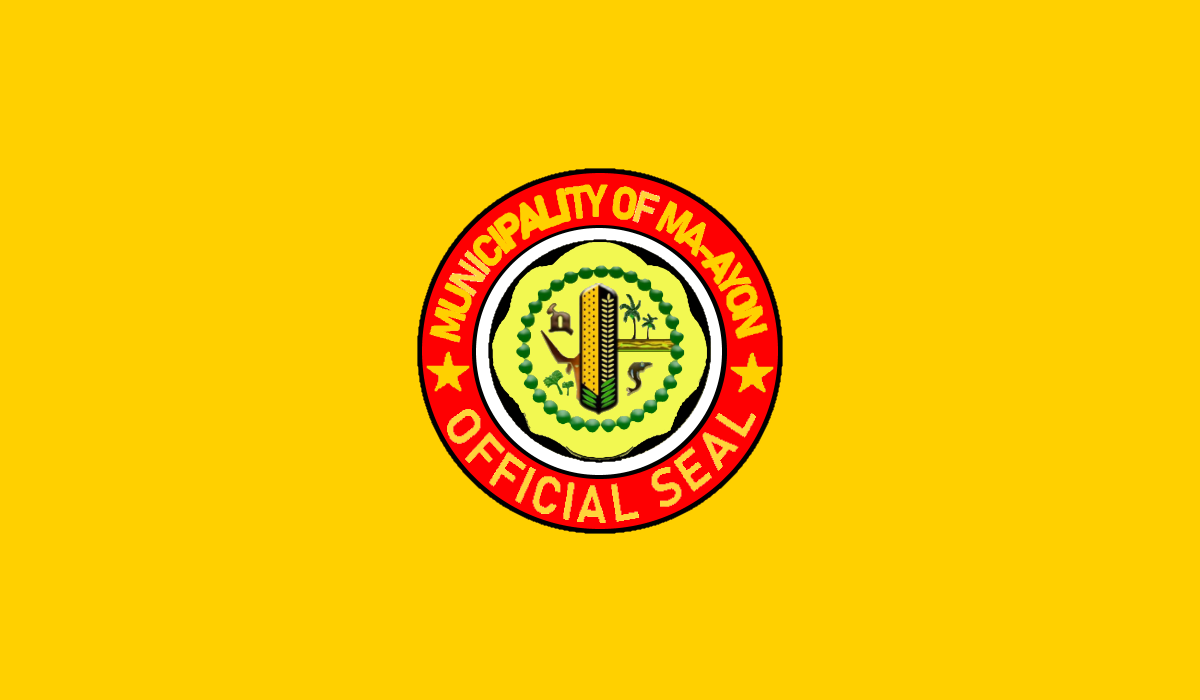
- Flag Seal Flag (state)
- Motto(s): Ma-ayon, Banwa ko! Palangga ko!
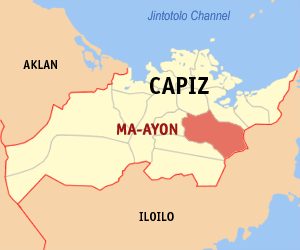
- Map of Capiz with Ma-ayon highlighted
- Interactive map of Ma-ayon
- Location within the Philippines
- Coordinates: 11°23′25″N 122°46′58″E
- Country: Philippines
- Region: Western Visayas
- Province: Capiz
- District: 1st district
- Barangays: 32 (see Barangays)

Government
  - Type: Sangguniang Bayan
  - Mayor: Raymond D. Malapajo (1Capiz)
  - Vice Mayor: Jose C. Dapulaza (1Capiz)
  - Representative: Ivan Howard A. Guintu (IND)
  - Municipal Council: Members: Chriselle Joy D. Diaz; Noel D. Diestro; Nichole D. Delfin; Eden D. Diaz; Wilfredo B. Borres, III; Wildie D. Duronio; Rene D. Barrios; Rodelyn D. Hacermida
  - Electorate: 28,193 voters (2025)

Area
  - Total: 142.32 km^{2} (54.95 sq mi)
- Elevation: 55 m (180 ft)
- Highest elevation: 335 m (1,099 ft)
- Lowest elevation: 3 m (9.8 ft)

Population (2024 census)
  - Total: 42,997
  - Density: 302.11/km^{2} (782.47/sq mi)
  - Households: 10,687

Economy
  - Income class: 2nd municipal income class
  - Poverty incidence: 20.68% (2023)
  - Revenue: ₱ 188.7 million (2024)
  - Assets: ₱ 483 million (2024)
  - Expenditure: ₱ 94.62 million (2024)
  - Liabilities: ₱ 114.5 million (2024)

Service provider
  - Electricity: Capiz Electric Cooperative (CAPELCO)
- Time zone: UTC+8 (PST)
- ZIP code: 5809
- PSGC: 061907000
- IDD : area code: +63 (0)36
- Native languages: Capisnon; Hiligaynon; Tagalog

Ma-ayon, officially the Municipality of Ma-ayon (Capiznon/Hiligaynon: Banwa sang Ma-ayon; Tagalog: Bayan ng Ma-ayon), is a municipality in the province of Capiz, Philippines. According to the 2024 census, it has a population of 42,997 people.

== Etymology ==
As to the origin of the name of Maayon not much has been written about it, but folks speak of several versions and one among those considered most popular was when a group of Spanish soldiers while pursuing the insurgents, discovered a settlement near the bank of the river. Finding the people to be hospitable and nice, they asked for the name of the place. Since the natives did not understand the Spanish language, they assumed that what the Spaniards were asking for what is the status of the harvest, for them it was harvest time. The natives answered "Maayo man". So the Spaniards named the settlement "El Pueblo de Maayon". Thus, the name Maayon was derived from that word and to this very day, it is known as such.

== History ==
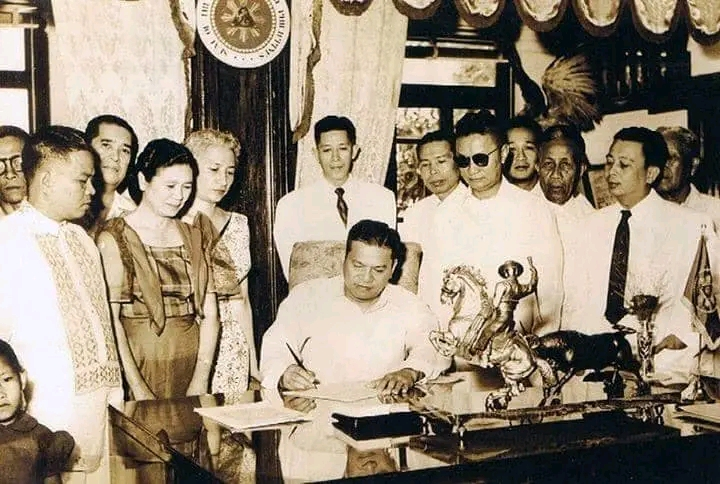
The historic signing of R.A. 1203 which created the Municipality of Maayon by late President Ramon Magsaysay, Sr. at Malacañan Palace last March 30, 1955.

Maayon first became a town during the early American era. However, during the Cadastral Survey, it was reverted to a barrio status under the Municipality of Pontevedra. For nearly half a century, the residents fought hard and long for its restoration to a separate and distinct entity. Their untiring efforts were empty rewarded when in 1955, Carmen Dinglasan Consing, representative of the first District the Province of Capiz field House Bill No. 2098 in the lower chamber of Congress. Senator Justinano S. Montaño sponsored and steered the bill until its approval. Finally on March 30, 1955, President Ramon Magsaysay signed the bill re-creating the Municipality of Maayon, Capiz in a ceremony held in Malacañan.

The "New Municipality" included eight barrios then, namely, Maayon, Fernandez, Piña, Balighot, Batabat, Guia, Tuburan and Canapian Sur. Now it has thirty two (32) barangays.

The ceremony was attended by a large delegation from Capiz. The President also signed the appointment of the following officials of the new town: For Mayor, Rafael M. Declaro Sr.; For Vice Mayor, Ernesto Diaz; For Councilors, Marcelo Diaz, Felomino Comoro, Damaso Deocampo, Ambrosio Dumagpi, Agustin Barruela and Marcelo Delfin. These officials, have gone back to their maker.

Also present during the historic signing of Republic Act No. 1203 were Representative Judge Godofredo and Mr. Rafael Dinglasan Sr., Judge Antonio J. Beldia, Romeo Arceño, Gabriel Borres and his two sons Roberto and Athos, Mamerto Dadula. Most of the wives of the officials of the town also witnessed the memorable occasion.

Among the town's first officials were: Uldarico Dieta, Secretary: Amado S. Almalbis, Treasurer: Ponciano Declaro, Judge: and Diosdado Borres, Chief of Police; While Dr. Manuel Buenvenida, who was then Rural Health Physician for Pontevedra, took temporary charge of the rural health services of the new town until his transfer to Pres. Roxas which Dr. Ricardo A. Dasal replaced him until 1956 when Dr. Alejandro Orosco was appointed and took over as the regular Rural Health Physician. Rev. Fr. Crisogono Dequiña was then parish priest.

Rafael M. Declaro Sr. who was also the first elected mayor of the town during its first election in November 1955 won with less than 200 majority over Atty. Artagnan D. Roxas. He relinquished the mayorship to his running mate, Prudencio L. Alovera, when he assumed the position of municipal judge of the same town. The late Mayor Alovera served from 1957 to 1971, the longest term in the 25-year existence of the municipality. Alovera did not seek re-election in 1971. Bertile D. Comoro, fresh from college, ran and won against the late Jose B. Diaz III. Comoro serves as the third executive of the town until February 1986 when President Corazon C. Aquino, who won through People's Power, appointed Jose B. Diaz Jr. as officer-in-charge of the Office of the Mayor which the latter assumed the post but relinquished it a month later after receiving his appointment as Board Member of the Province of Capiz. Rolando L. Eleazar then took charge of the Office of the Mayor.

== Geography ==
Maayon is a town that is known for its nature. The municipality is one of the sixteen towns constituting the province of Capiz. It lies on the northern portion of the province where its neighbors are the municipalities of Cuartero and Dumarao and a part of llo-ilo. It is about 32 kilometers away from the capital. Toward its north is the municipality of Pontevedra and Panit-an.

The town comprises 32 barangays. In general the land is divided into upland and lowland and considered a remote town. Out of these fragile place the highest mountain so far is Villa Flores which is divided between the East and the West. Maayon has a beautiful river which is noted for its abundant gravel and sand. The river links up to the boundary of Maindang river where it flows towards the bank of Calaan, then reaches up to the town of Panit-an. Years before, this river served the people of Maayon as means of their transportation to bring their product to market and bring their products to the other town and city.

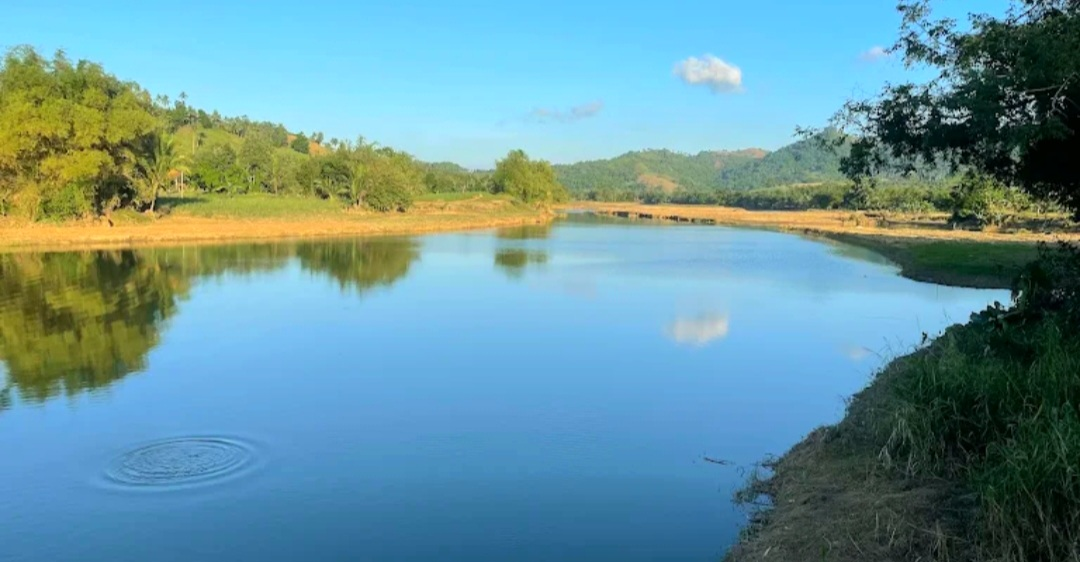
Maayon River, Brgy. Jebaca, Maayon

Some portion of the Maayon is considered flat and hilly and its eastern section is mountainous. Due to the existence of the Maayon River which flows from the boundary of Iloilo in the east towards the Panay River in the west, Maayon has an abundant quarry of gravel and sand.

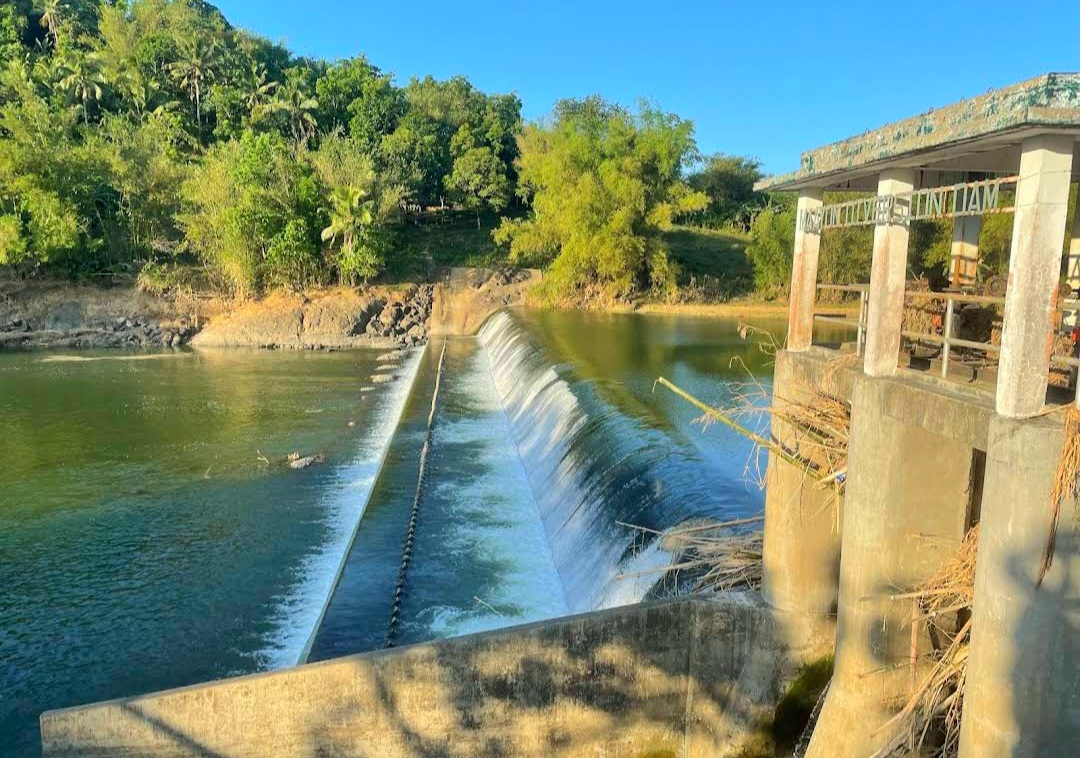
Maayon Diversion River Dam

It is believed that the mountains of Maayon have rich deposits of valuable minerals like copper, gold rock, manganese, and limestone. Its plains are fertile lands, making the town basically rice producing, and farming as the main livelihood of the inhabitants. Every harvest, Maayon produces a great surplus of palay marketed to the neighboring towns and even to nearby towns of Iloilo.

Maayon has a total land area of 142.32 km^2. It is 32 kilometres (20 mi) from Roxas City, the provincial capital.

=== Climate ===
Climate data for Maayon, Capiz
Month	Jan	Feb	Mar	Apr	May	Jun	Jul	Aug	Sep	Oct	Nov	Dec	Year
Mean daily maximum °C (°F)	27 (81)	28 (82)	29 (84)	31 (88)	32 (90)	31 (88)	30 (86)	30 (86)	29 (84)	29 (84)	29 (84)	27 (81)	29 (85)
Mean daily minimum °C (°F)	23 (73)	23 (73)	23 (73)	24 (75)	25 (77)	25 (77)	24 (75)	24 (75)	24 (75)	24 (75)	24 (75)	23 (73)	24 (75)
Average precipitation mm (inches)	61 (2.4)	39 (1.5)	46 (1.8)	48 (1.9)	90 (3.5)	144 (5.7)	152 (6.0)	145 (5.7)	163 (6.4)	160 (6.3)	120 (4.7)	90 (3.5)	1,258 (49.4)
Average rainy days	12.3	9.0	9.9	10.0	18.5	25.0	27.4	26.0	25.9	24.9	17.9	14.2	221
Source: Meteoblue

=== Barangays ===
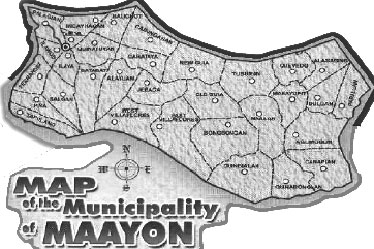
Map of Barangays of Maayon

Maayon is politically subdivided into 32 barangays Each barangay consists of puroks and some have sitios.

- Aglimocon
- Alasaging
- Alayunan
- Balighot
- Batabat
- Bongbongan
- Cabungahan
- Canapian
- Carataya
- Duluan
- East Villaflores
- Fernandez
- Guinbi-alan
- Indayagan
- Jebaca
- Maalan
- Manayupit
- New Guia
- Quevedo (Ngalan)
- Old Guia
- Palaguian
- Parallan
- Piña
- Poblacion Ilawod
- Poblacion Ilaya
- Poblacion Tabuc
- Quinabonglan
- Quinat-uyan
- Salgan
- Tapulang
- Tuburan
- West Villaflores

== Demographics ==
Population census of Ma-ayon
Year	Pop.	±% p.a.
1903	4,007	—
1960	16,386	+2.50%
1970	20,229	+2.13%
1975	23,075	+2.68%
1980	25,715	+2.19%
1990	29,808	+1.49%
1995	30,333	+0.33%
2000	32,700	+1.62%
2007	35,448	+1.12%
2010	36,430	+1.00%
2015	38,416	+1.02%
2020	41,226	+1.50%
2024	42,997	+1.01%
Source: Philippine Statistics Authority

Maayon's total population based on the census survey has an annual growth rate put at 1.11%.

In the 2024 census, the population of Maayon was 42,997 people, with a density of 300 inhabitants per square kilometre or 780 inhabitants per square mile.

== Economy ==
Poverty incidence of Ma-ayon (%)

Source: Philippine Statistics Authority

== Government ==
=== Elected officials ===
The current municipal mayor is Raymond D. Malapajo since 2019.

=== Former local chief executives ===
- Rafael M. Declaro Sr. (1955-1957)
- Prudencio L. Alovera (1957-1971)
- Bertile D. Comoro Sr. (1972-1986)
- Jose B. Diaz Jr. (1986) - OIC
- Rolando L. Eleazar (1986-1988) - OIC
- Honorio B. Diaz Sr. (1988-1998)
- Miguel Dillera (1998-2001)
- Billy D. Dueñas (2001-2010)
- Wilfredo E. Borres Sr. (2010-2019)

=== Municipal hall ===
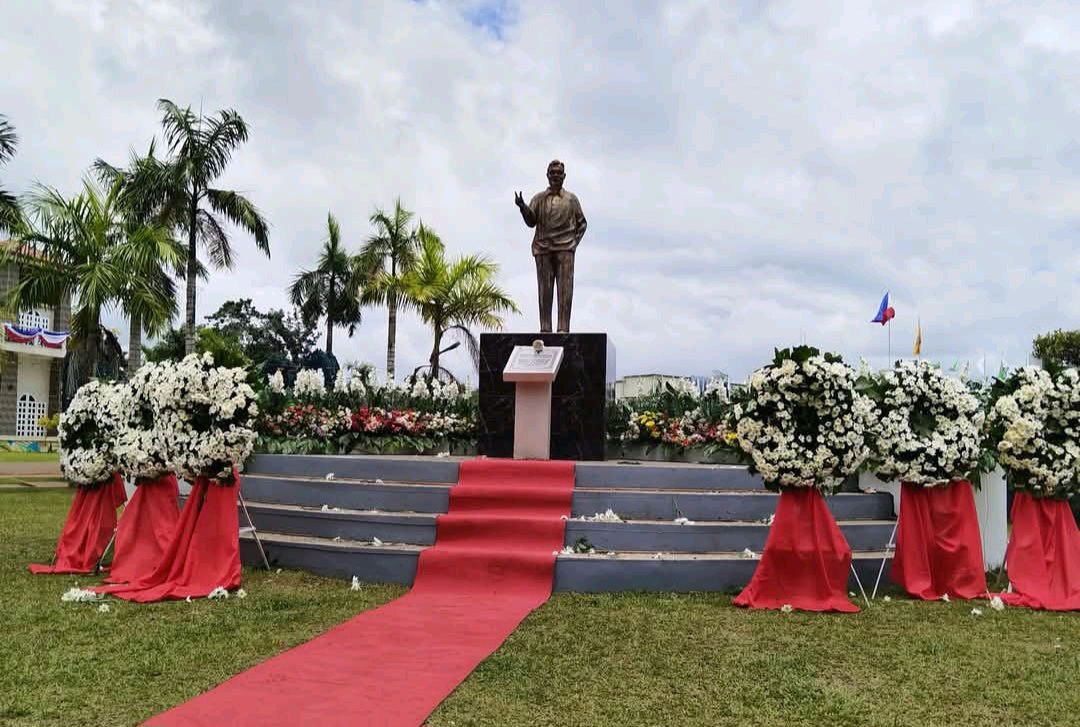
President Magsaysay Shrine

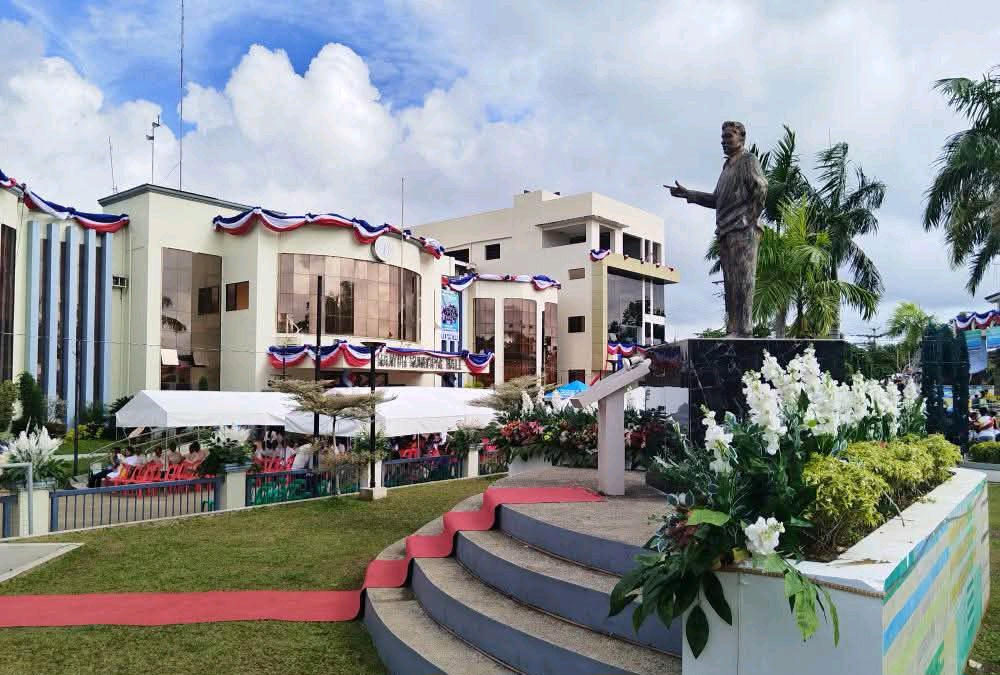
Maayon Town Hall left of Magsaysay Shrine

The new municipal building was inaugurated in 2005. The construction of building started last 2000 and completely finished in 2005.

== Culture ==
Hil-o Hil-o: Maayonanons Way of Life. The etymological origin of the word is up to now yet unknown, but its concept as practiced in our way of life over the years has been very visible and already firmly assimilated in the culture of Maayonanons.

Hil-o Hil-o is reciprocity that demonstrates mutual interdependence among our people. It expressed itself in many forms and in many ways. It could simply be taking turns in helping one another to make a heavy work for one becomes lighter. It can also be rendering services or giving material donation for a relative, a friend or a neighbor who is holding a very important affair in the family.

== Tourism ==
Maayon has several landmarks that symbolizes its history and culture. The town is known for its natural ecological beauty and diversity, which is evident from its mountain ranges and caves.

=== Landmarks ===
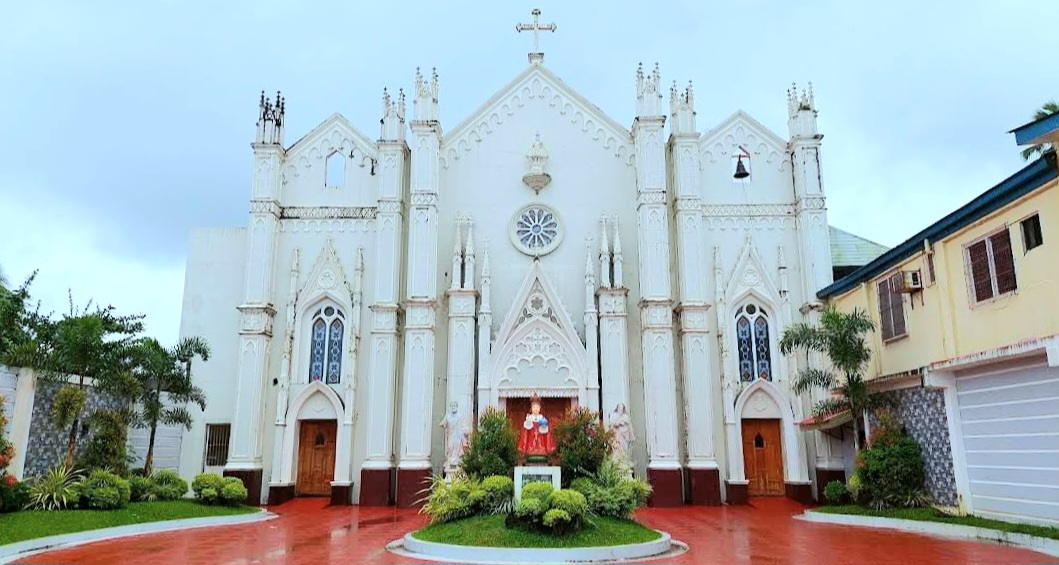
Holy Child Parish Church

==== Handurawan Museum ====
The "Handurawan” Library and Museum" displays and exhibits old coins, rocks, precious memorabilia, other reading material and historical photos, before the rehabilitation of the museum from 1993 – 1998. It was the “Gabaldon Building”, erected in 1911 under Gabaldon Act 1901, that served as the primary school. The old Gabaldon building was named after Sec. Gabaldon when he was Secretary of Education during the Commonwealth Government.

==== Magsaysay Shrine ====
The shrine is built in honor of the late Pres. Ramon Magsaysay Sr. for re-creating the Municipality of Maayon.

=== Natural attractions ===
==== Mag-olot Falls ====
Resort in East Villaflores Maayon Capiz is one of the tourist attraction of Maayon. Mag-olot Falls Resort is located on the Southern Portion of the Barangay.

==== Igang Cave ====
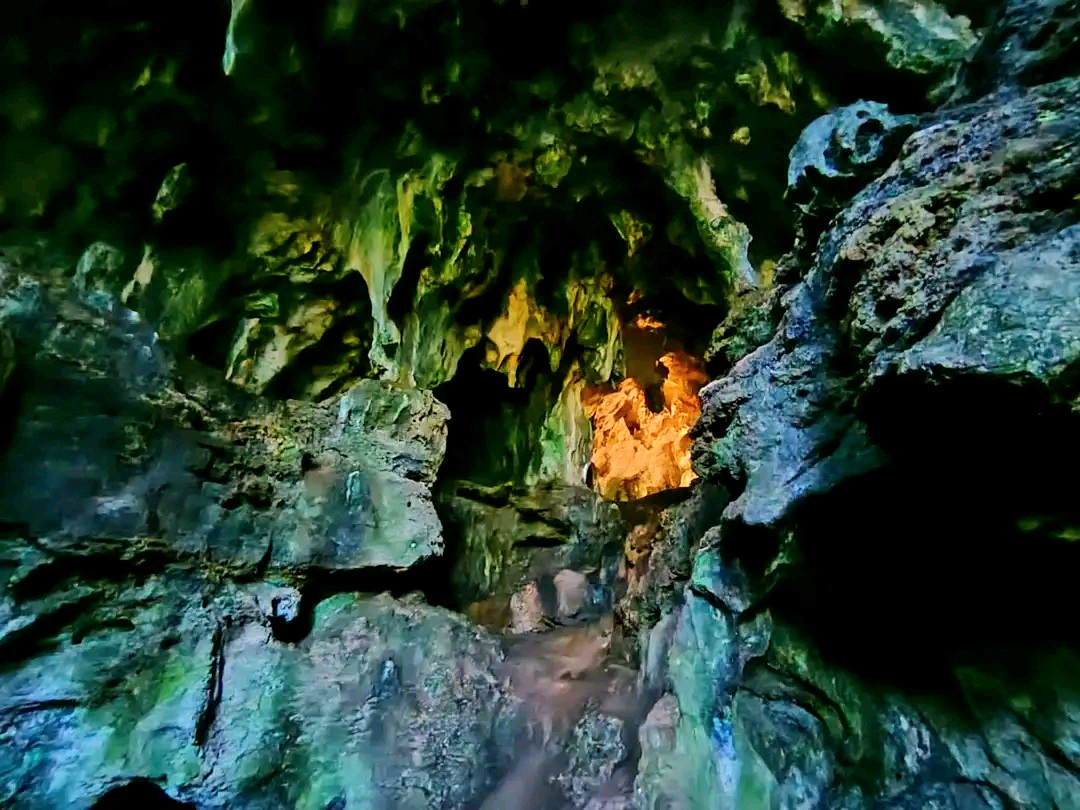
Inside Igang Cave, Brgy. Tapulang, Maayon

This is one of the tourist attractions in the province of Capiz, could be found in Barangay Tapulang, Maayon. It is 7 kilometers away from the town proper. It has many entrances at different levels all leading in main chamber which is well lighted and well ventilated.

==== Busay Dapuyan ====
It is the waterfall at Sitio Bailan Bato, Barangay Salgan. Perched in hills overlooking the village is the clear waterfall. There is a forest and a little talahib growth. Some are suited for pasture grassland.

== Education ==
The Maayon Schools District Office governs all educational institutions within the municipality. It oversees the management and operations of all private and public, from primary to secondary schools.

Primary and elementary schools

- Aglimocon Elementary School
- Alasaging Elementary School
- Alayunan Elementary School
- Balighot Elementary School
- Batabat Elementary School
- Cabungahan Elementary School
- Carataya Elementary School
- Dominador T. Esmeralda Elementary School
- East Villaflores Elementary School
- Fernandez Elementary School
- Ilawod Elementary School
- Indayagan PS
- Jebaca Elementary School
- Maalan Primary School
- Maayon Elementary School
- Manayupit Elementary School
- New Guia Elementary School
- Old Guia PS
- Palaguian Elementary School
- Parallan Elementary School
- Piña Elementary School
- Quevedo Elementary School
- Quinabonglan Elementary School
- Quinat-uyan Elementary School
- Salgan Elementary School
- Tepacla Elementary School
- Tuburan Elementary School
- West Villaflores Elementary School

Secondary schools

- Canapian Integrated School
- Duluan Integrated School
- East Villaflores National High School
- Florentina B. Degala National High School
- Guinbialan Integrated School
- Maayon National High School
- Tapulang Integrated School
- Tuburan National High School
