= Dao, Capiz =

Municipality in Capiz, Philippines

Dao
- Municipality
- Municipality of Dao
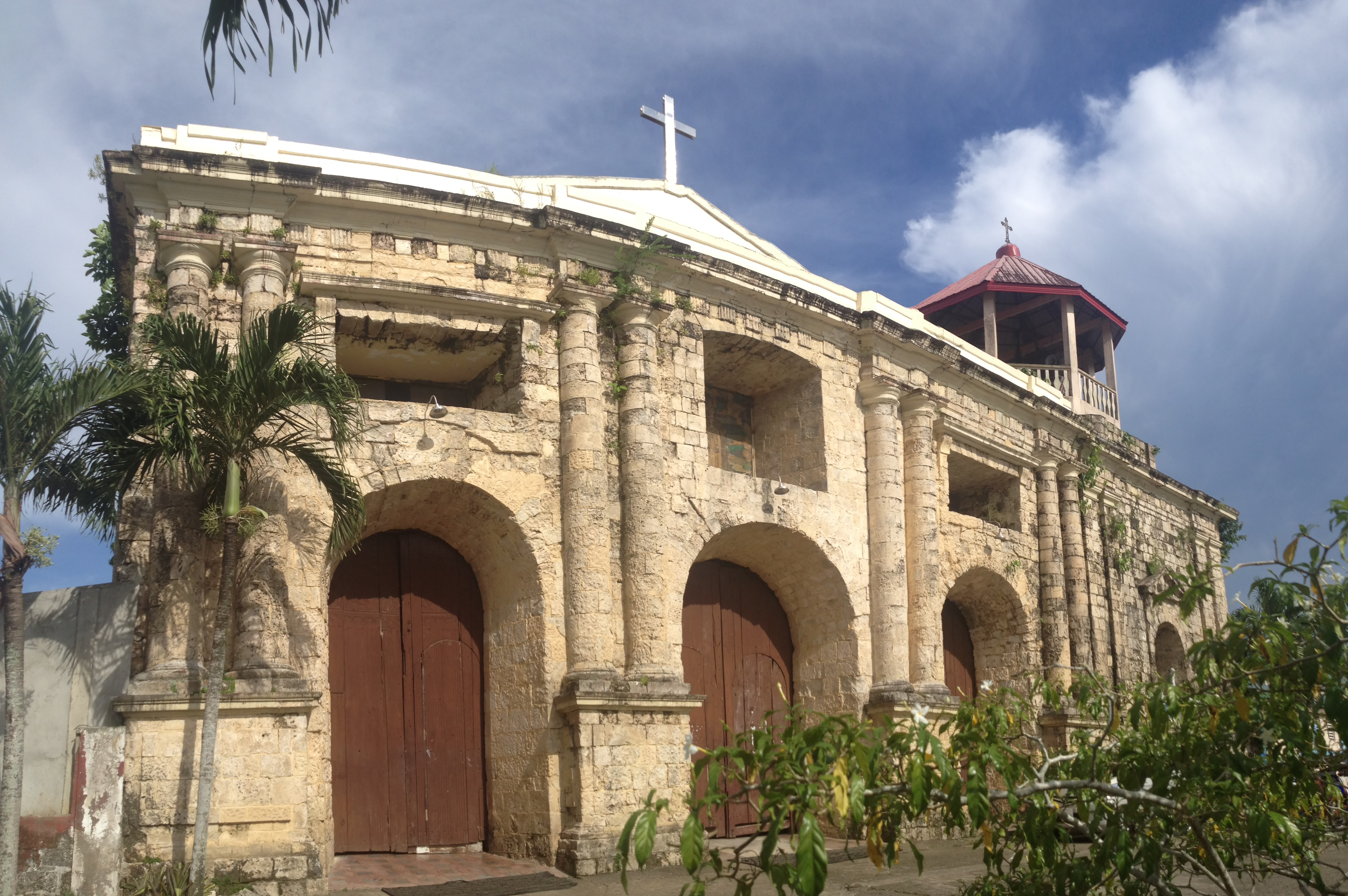
- Church of Dao (St. Thomas of Villanova Parish Church)

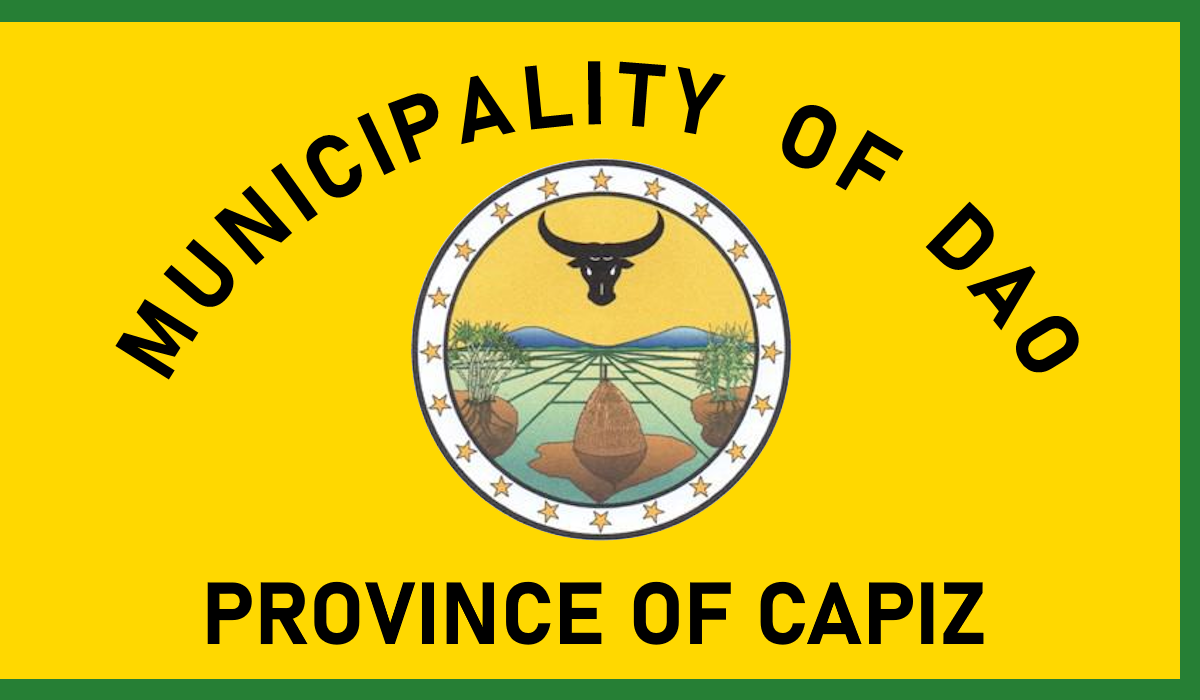
- Flag Seal
- Etymology: Dao
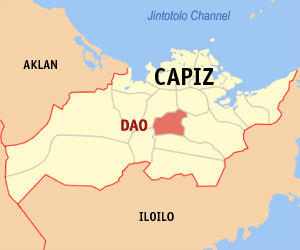
- Map of Capiz with Dao highlighted
- Interactive map of Dao
- Location within the Philippines
- Coordinates: 11°23′40″N 122°41′09″E
- Country: Philippines
- Region: Western Visayas
- Province: Capiz
- District: 2nd district
- Barangays: 20 (see Barangays)

Government
  - Type: Sangguniang Bayan
  - Mayor: Jose Jimbo D. Barruela (1Capiz)
  - Vice Mayor: Dominico A. Daños, Jr. (1Capiz)
  - Representative: Jane T. Castro (Lakas)
  - Municipal Council: Members: Kathylynn Mae B. Fuentes; Erwin Rommel J. Andrada; Joan B. Adonay; Nelson E. Estialbo, Jr.; Norberto P. Francisco; Aaron M. Carillo; Elmer B. Magbanua
  - Electorate: 23,072 voters (2025)

Area
  - Total: 88.64 km^{2} (34.22 sq mi)
- Elevation: 34 m (112 ft)
- Highest elevation: 291 m (955 ft)
- Lowest elevation: 5 m (16 ft)

Population (2024 census)
  - Total: 34,555
  - Density: 389.8/km^{2} (1,010/sq mi)
  - Households: 8,333

Economy
  - Income class: 3rd municipal income class
  - Poverty incidence: 13.23% (2023)
  - Revenue: ₱ 161.6 million (2024)
  - Assets: ₱ 418.7 million (2024)
  - Expenditure: ₱ 76.17 million (2024)
  - Liabilities: ₱ 239.5 million (2024)

Service provider
  - Electricity: Capiz Electric Cooperative (CAPELCO)
- Time zone: UTC+8 (PST)
- ZIP code: 5810
- PSGC: 061902000
- IDD : area code: +63 (0)36
- Native languages: Capisnon; Hiligaynon; Tagalog
- Website: www.dao.gov.ph

Dao, officially the Municipality of Dao (Capiznon/Hiligaynon: Banwa sang Dao; Tagalog: Bayan ng Dao), is a municipality in the province of Capiz, Philippines. According to the 2024 census, it has a population of 34,555 people.

== Etymology ==
The name Dao came from a tall tree that grew in large numbers near the river. Local accounts say early leaders Isada and Paro chose the site after finding a large dao tree by the water.

== History ==
Dao is one of the earliest communities in Capiz. Older writings call it Divingdin and Mandruga, once a visita linked to the parish in Panay, the first place on the island reached by Spanish missionaries.

When Dumalag became a town in 1596, Dao was placed under it as a barrio. It became independent again on February 29, 1836 through a decree of Governor General Pedro A. Salazar and was placed under the patronage of Santo Tomas de Villanueva.

It was incorporated as a municipality following the founding of the Capiz Province in 1901. It was invaded by the Japanese 41st Infantry Regiment as part of their Panay operation on 16 April 1942. In 1957, the barrio of Nasuli-B was renamed to Santo Tomas.

The community developed through its rich soil, steady river systems and a climate that supported farming throughout the year.

== Geography ==
Dao is 32 kilometres (20 mi) from Roxas City.

=== Barangays ===
Dao is politically subdivided into 20 barangays. Each barangay consists of puroks and some have sitios.

- Aganan
- Agtambi
- Agtanguay
- Balucuan
- Bita
- Centro
- Daplas
- Duyoc
- Ilas Sur
- Lacaron
- Malonoy
- Manhoy
- Mapulang Bato
- Matagnop
- Nasunogan
- Poblacion Ilawod
- Poblacion Ilaya
- Quinabcaban
- Quinayuya
- San Agustin (Ilas Norte)

=== Climate ===
Climate data for Dao, Capiz
Month	Jan	Feb	Mar	Apr	May	Jun	Jul	Aug	Sep	Oct	Nov	Dec	Year
Mean daily maximum °C (°F)	27 (81)	28 (82)	29 (84)	31 (88)	32 (90)	31 (88)	30 (86)	30 (86)	29 (84)	29 (84)	29 (84)	27 (81)	29 (85)
Mean daily minimum °C (°F)	23 (73)	23 (73)	23 (73)	24 (75)	25 (77)	25 (77)	24 (75)	24 (75)	24 (75)	24 (75)	24 (75)	23 (73)	24 (75)
Average precipitation mm (inches)	61 (2.4)	39 (1.5)	46 (1.8)	48 (1.9)	90 (3.5)	144 (5.7)	152 (6.0)	145 (5.7)	163 (6.4)	160 (6.3)	120 (4.7)	90 (3.5)	1,258 (49.4)
Average rainy days	12.3	9.0	9.9	10.0	18.5	25.0	27.4	26.0	25.9	24.9	17.9	14.2	221
Source: Meteoblue (modeled/calculated data, not measured locally)

== Demographics ==
Population census of Dao
Year	Pop.	±% p.a.
1903	6,694	—
1918	17,116	+6.46%
1939	13,886	−0.99%
1948	13,706	−0.14%
1960	16,624	+1.62%
1970	18,535	+1.09%
1975	21,052	+2.59%
1980	23,921	+2.59%
1990	29,156	+2.00%
1995	29,266	+0.07%
2000	30,623	+0.98%
2007	31,420	+0.36%
2010	31,911	+0.57%
2015	32,496	+0.35%
2020	33,842	+0.86%
2024	34,555	+0.50%
Source: Philippine Statistics Authority

In the 2024 census, the population of Dao was 34,555 people, with a density of 390 inhabitants per square kilometre or 1,000 inhabitants per square mile.

== Economy ==
Poverty incidence of Dao (%)

Source: Philippine Statistics Authority

== Culture ==
=== Attractions ===
Dao has sites that are well known among natives and are tourist spots alike. These include:

- Sto. Tomas de Villanueva - local parish church
- Lolets Eco Park - a natural park with a resort

=== Festivities ===
The people of Dao celebrate festivals, sometimes along with other regions of the province, in events like:

- Pasalamat Festival
- Halaran Festival, although mostly held in Roxas City

== Education ==
The Dao Schools District Office governs all educational institutions within the municipality. It oversees the management and operations of all private and public, from primary to secondary schools.

=== Primary and elementary schools ===
- Agtambi Primary School
- Agtanguay Elementary School
- Alfonso E. Espiritu Elementary School
- Andres E. Quintia Sr. Elementary School
- Antonio Abad Elementary School
- Bita Primary School
- Centro Primary School
- Dao Central School
- Daplas Primary School
- Doane Baptist Kindergarten School
- Doroteo Eslaban, Sr. Elementary School
- Nicanor Escutin Elementary School
- Ilas Norte Elementary School
- Lacaron Elementary School
- Malonoy Elementary School
- Manhoy Elementary School
- Mapulang Bato Primary School
- Matagnop Elementary School
- Quinayuya Elementary School
- Tabuc Elementary School
- Wonderfully Made Learning Center

=== Secondary schools ===
- Arturo Jugo National High School
- Dao National High School
- Luis Escutin National High School
- Malonoy National High School

== Notable personalities ==
- Jocelyn Bolante (b. 1951), Politician, former undersecretary
