= President Roxas, Capiz =

Municipality in Capiz, Philippines

President Roxas Lutod-lutod
- Municipality
- Municipality of President Roxas
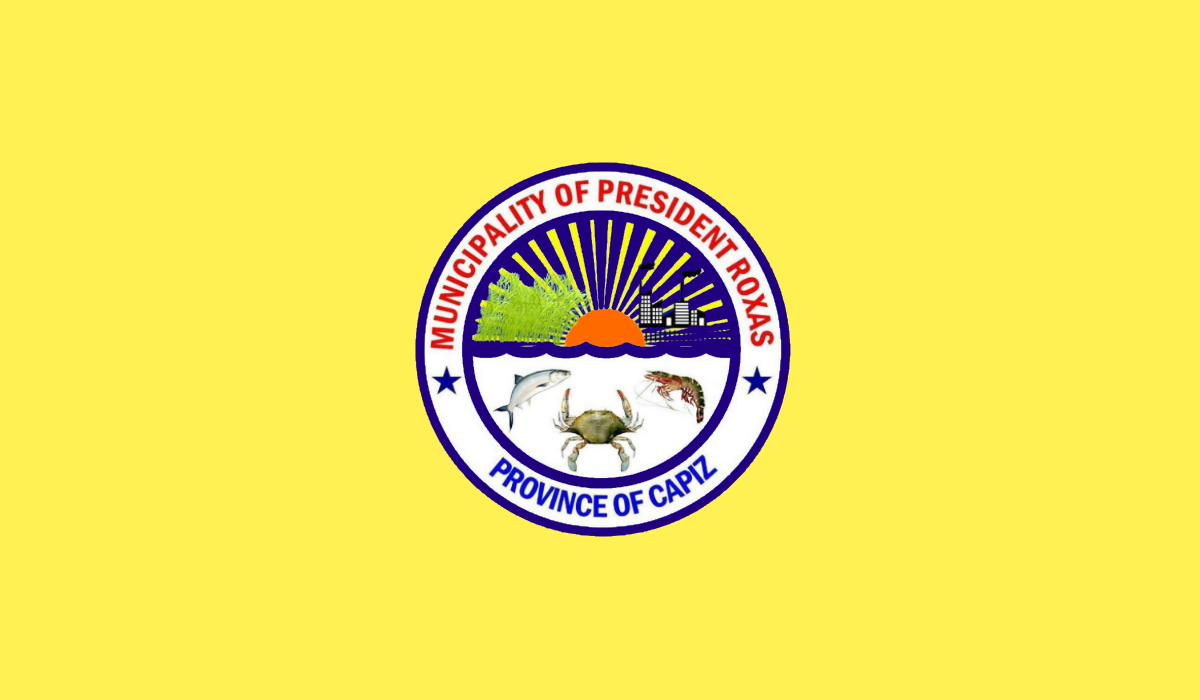
- Flag

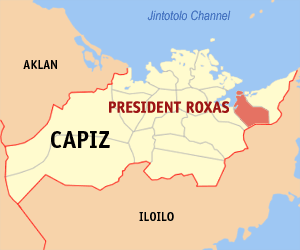
- Map of Capiz with President Roxas highlighted
- Interactive map of President Roxas
- Location within the Philippines
- Coordinates: 11°25′47″N 122°55′29″E
- Country: Philippines
- Region: Western Visayas
- Province: Capiz
- District: 1st district
- Founded: June 14, 1949
- Named for: Manuel Roxas
- Barangays: 22 (see Barangays)

Government
  - Type: Sangguniang Bayan
  - Mayor: Receliste L. Escolin (IND)
  - Vice Mayor: Jhefferson B. Pastrana (IND)
  - Representative: Ivan Howard A. Guintu (IND)
  - Municipal Council: Members: Jun V. Beltran; Danilo B. Diosaban; Georly F. Lachica; Jover G. Bereber; Maria Xandria P. Samson; Earvin Michael B. Degala; Luis B. Garra; Jeffrey B. Dela Cruz; Ferdinand Bacanto (Liga ng mga Barangay- Ex Officio); Niño Angelo A. Dela Paz (SKMF President- Ex Officio)
  - Electorate: 21,315 voters (2025)

Area
  - Total: 77.88 km^{2} (30.07 sq mi)
- Elevation: 88 m (289 ft)
- Highest elevation: 813 m (2,667 ft)
- Lowest elevation: −2 m (−6.6 ft)

Population (2024 census)
  - Total: 32,436
  - Density: 416.5/km^{2} (1,079/sq mi)
  - Households: 7,871

Economy
  - Income class: 3rd municipal income class
  - Poverty incidence: 15.96% (2023)
  - Revenue: ₱ 166.5 million (2024)
  - Assets: ₱ 521.4 million (2024)
  - Expenditure: ₱ 60.29 million (2024)
  - Liabilities: ₱ 97.61 million (2024)

Service provider
  - Electricity: Capiz Electric Cooperative (CAPELCO)
- Time zone: UTC+8 (PST)
- ZIP code: 5803
- PSGC: 061913000
- IDD : area code: +63 (0)36
- Native languages: Capisnon; Hiligaynon; Tagalog

President Roxas, officially the Municipality of President Roxas, is a municipality in the province of Capiz, Philippines. According to the 2024 census, it has a population of 32,436 people.

Formerly known as Lutod-lutod and a part of Pilar, Capiz, it is 37 kilometers (23 mi) from the provincial capital, Roxas City.

== History ==
In 1949, the sitios and barrios of Aranguel, Culilang, Pandan, Pinamihagan, Cadoulan, Quiajo, Sangcal, Pondol, Marita, Madulano, Jabuyana, Bo-ac, Cabugcabug, Goce Badiangon, Bayuyan, Agbobolo, Cubay, Ibaca, and the sitio of Lotudlotud (Lutod-lutod), which was converted into a barrio of Elizalde, was separated from Pilar and formed into the separate town of President Roxas by virtue of Republic Act No. 374.

In 1952, barrio of Agbobolo was renamed Manoling.

== Geography ==
=== Barangays ===
President Roxas is politically subdivided into 22 barangays. Each barangay consists of puroks and some have sitios.

- Aranguel
- Badiangon
- Bayuyan
- Cabugcabug
- Carmencita
- Cubay
- Culilang
- Goce
- Hanglid
- Ibaca
- Madulano
- Manoling
- Marita
- Pandan
- Pantalan
- Pinamihagan
- Poblacion
- Pondol
- Quiajo
- Sangkal
- Santo Niño
- Vizcaya

=== Climate ===
Climate data for President Roxas, Capiz
Month	Jan	Feb	Mar	Apr	May	Jun	Jul	Aug	Sep	Oct	Nov	Dec	Year
Mean daily maximum °C (°F)	27 (81)	28 (82)	29 (84)	31 (88)	32 (90)	31 (88)	30 (86)	30 (86)	29 (84)	29 (84)	29 (84)	27 (81)	29 (85)
Mean daily minimum °C (°F)	23 (73)	23 (73)	23 (73)	24 (75)	25 (77)	25 (77)	24 (75)	24 (75)	24 (75)	24 (75)	24 (75)	23 (73)	24 (75)
Average precipitation mm (inches)	61 (2.4)	39 (1.5)	46 (1.8)	48 (1.9)	90 (3.5)	144 (5.7)	152 (6.0)	145 (5.7)	163 (6.4)	160 (6.3)	120 (4.7)	90 (3.5)	1,258 (49.4)
Average rainy days	12.3	9.0	9.9	10.0	18.5	25.0	27.4	26.0	25.9	24.9	17.9	14.2	221
Source: Meteoblue

== Demographics ==
Population census of President Roxas
Year	Pop.	±% p.a.
1960	15,263	—
1970	19,972	+2.72%
1975	21,632	+1.61%
1980	21,805	+0.16%
1990	24,052	+0.99%
1995	24,695	+0.50%
2000	27,531	+2.36%
2007	28,459	+0.46%
2010	28,561	+0.13%
2015	29,676	+0.73%
2020	31,269	+1.11%
2024	32,436	+0.88%
Source: Philippine Statistics Authority

In the 2024 census, the population of Pres. Roxas was 32,436 people, with a density of 420 inhabitants per square kilometre or 1,100 inhabitants per square mile.

== Economy ==
Poverty incidence of President Roxas (%)

Source: Philippine Statistics Authority

== Education ==
The President Roxas Schools District Office governs all educational institutions within the municipality. It oversees the management and operations of all private and public, from primary to secondary schools.

Primary and elementary schools

- Aranguel Elementary School
- Badiangon Elementary School
- Bayuyan Elementary School
- Bliss Pantalan Elementary School
- Domingo M. Locsin Elementary School
- Cabugcabug Elementary School
- Carmencita-Sto.Niño Elementary School
- Cubay-Ibaca Elementary School
- Goce Elementary School
- Madulano Elementary School
- Manoling Elementary School
- Marita Elementary School
- Pandan Elementary School
- Pondol Elementary School
- Pres. Roxas East Elementary School
- Pres. Roxas Fundamental Baptist Learning Center
- Pres. Roxas West Elementary School
- Sangkal Elementary School
- Vedasto T. Javellosa Elementary School

Secondary schools

- Feliciano Yusay Consing National High School
- Quiajo Integrated School

== See also ==
- List of renamed cities and municipalities in the Philippines
