= Ivisan =

Municipality in Capiz, Philippines

- Municipality
- Municipality of Ivisan
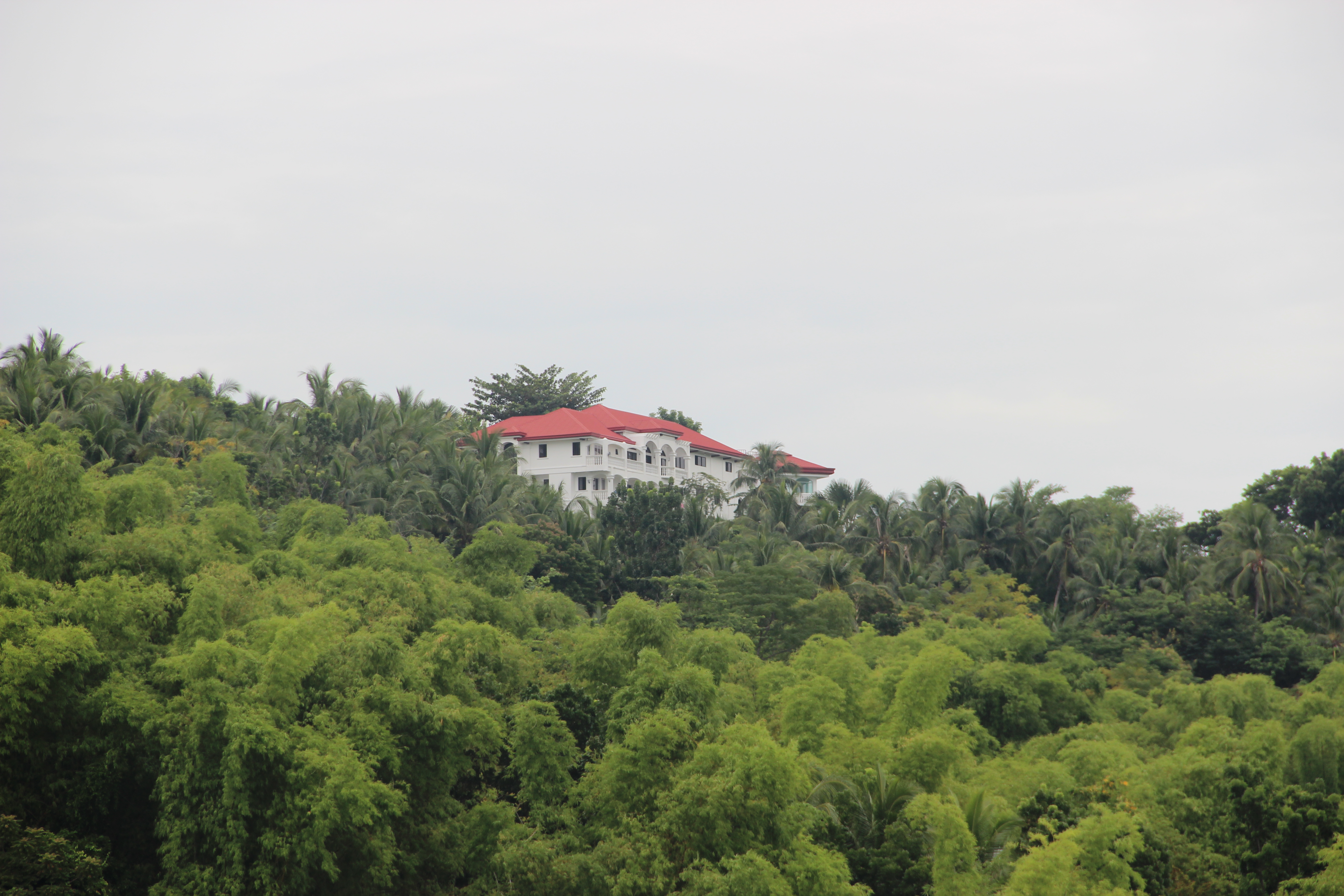
- A house in Ivisan

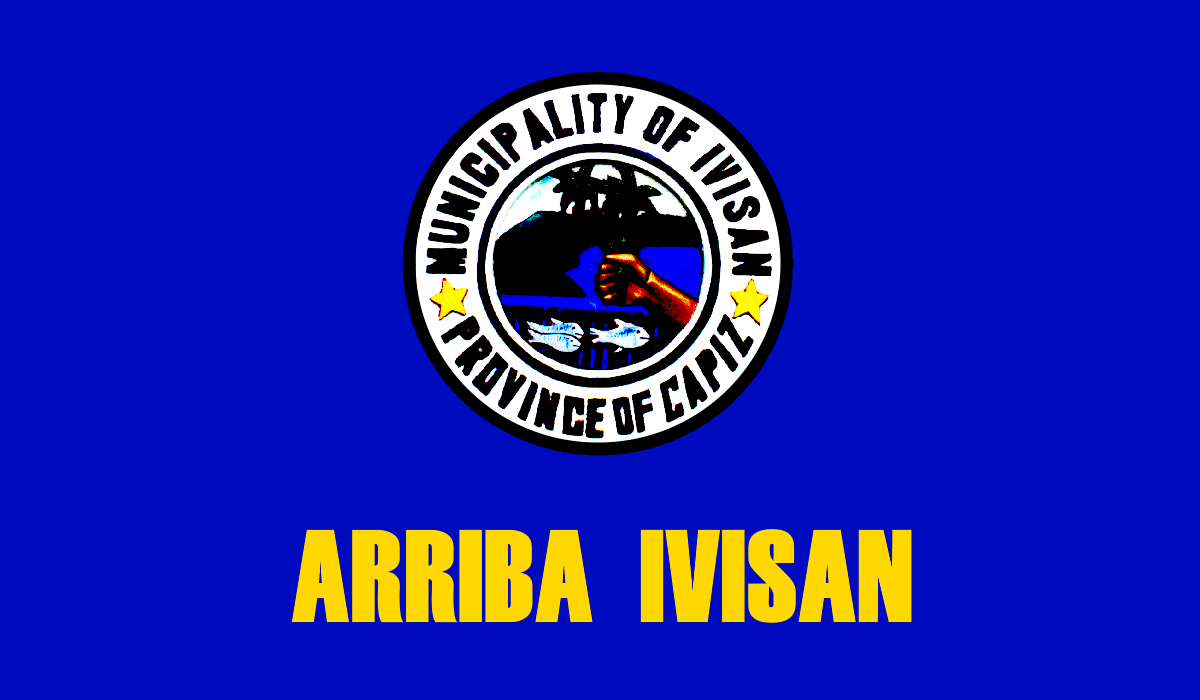
- Flag

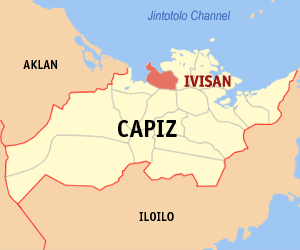
- Map of Capiz with Ivisan highlighted
- Interactive map of Ivisan
- Location within the Philippines
- Coordinates: 11°31′18″N 122°41′27″E
- Country: Philippines
- Region: Western Visayas
- Province: Capiz
- District: 2nd district
- Barangays: 15 (see Barangays)

Government
  - Type: Sangguniang Bayan
  - Mayor: Felipe Neri N. Yap (1Capiz)
  - Vice Mayor: Jose Romeo U. Yap (1Capiz)
  - Representative: Jane T. Castro (Lakas)
  - Municipal Council: Members: Romulo T. Loberes, Jr.; Bonifacio B. Ugas; Brian Blaise B. Apruebo; Alfonso O. Villar, Jr.; Benedick V. Billones; Bito O. Delos Santos, Sr.; Catherine A. San Antonio; Joebert D. Alcazaren
  - Electorate: 21,770 voters (2025)

Area
  - Total: 54.2 km^{2} (20.9 sq mi)
- Elevation: 15 m (49 ft)
- Highest elevation: 390 m (1,280 ft)
- Lowest elevation: −1 m (−3.3 ft)

Population (2024 census)
  - Total: 32,853
  - Density: 606/km^{2} (1,570/sq mi)
  - Households: 7,794

Economy
  - Income class: 3rd municipal income class
  - Poverty incidence: 12.42% (2023)
  - Revenue: ₱ 150.2 million (2024)
  - Assets: ₱ 369.3 million (2024)
  - Expenditure: ₱ 63.91 million (2024)
  - Liabilities: ₱ 59.89 million (2024)

Service provider
  - Electricity: Capiz Electric Cooperative (CAPELCO)
- Time zone: UTC+8 (PST)
- ZIP code: 5805
- PSGC: 061905000
- IDD : area code: +63 (0)36
- Native languages: Capisnon; Hiligaynon; Tagalog
- Website: lguivisan.gov.ph

Ivisan, officially the Municipality of Ivisan (Capiznon/Hiligaynon: Banwa sang Ivisan; Tagalog: Bayan ng Ivisan), is a municipality in the province of Capiz, Philippines. According to the 2024 census, it has a population of 32,853 people.

== Geography ==
Ivisan is 16 kilometres (9.9 mi) from the provincial capital, Roxas City.

=== Barangays ===
Ivisan is politically subdivided into 15 barangays. Each barangay consists of puroks and some have sitios.

- Agmalobo
- Agustin Navarra (Agumang - ang)
- Balaring
- Basiao
- Cabugao
- Cudian
- Ilaya-Ivisan (Yabton)
- Malocloc Norte
- Malocloc Sur (Mahayag)
- Matnog
- Mianay
- Ondoy
- Poblacion Norte
- Poblacion Sur
- Santa Cruz

=== Climate ===
Climate data for Ivisan, Capiz
Month	Jan	Feb	Mar	Apr	May	Jun	Jul	Aug	Sep	Oct	Nov	Dec	Year
Mean daily maximum °C (°F)	27 (81)	28 (82)	29 (84)	31 (88)	32 (90)	31 (88)	30 (86)	30 (86)	29 (84)	29 (84)	29 (84)	27 (81)	29 (85)
Mean daily minimum °C (°F)	23 (73)	23 (73)	23 (73)	24 (75)	25 (77)	25 (77)	24 (75)	24 (75)	24 (75)	24 (75)	24 (75)	23 (73)	24 (75)
Average precipitation mm (inches)	61 (2.4)	39 (1.5)	46 (1.8)	48 (1.9)	90 (3.5)	144 (5.7)	152 (6.0)	145 (5.7)	163 (6.4)	160 (6.3)	120 (4.7)	90 (3.5)	1,258 (49.4)
Average rainy days	12.3	9.0	9.9	10.0	18.5	25.0	27.4	26.0	25.9	24.9	17.9	14.2	221
Source: Meteoblue

== Demographics ==
Population census of Ivisan
Year	Pop.	±% p.a.
1903	4,606	—
1918	4,418	−0.28%
1939	6,369	+1.76%
1948	7,678	+2.10%
1960	10,627	+2.75%
1970	13,593	+2.49%
1975	15,374	+2.50%
1980	17,414	+2.52%
1990	21,510	+2.14%
1995	22,720	+1.03%
2000	24,256	+1.41%
2007	25,882	+0.90%
2010	26,763	+1.23%
2015	29,055	+1.58%
2020	31,278	+1.56%
2024	32,853	+1.19%
Source: Philippine Statistics Authority

In the 2024 census, the population of Ivisan was 32,853 people, with a density of 610 inhabitants per square kilometre or 1,600 inhabitants per square mile.

== Economy ==
Poverty incidence of Ivisan (%)

Source: Philippine Statistics Authority

== Education ==
The Ivisan Schools District Office governs all educational institutions within the municipality. It oversees the management and operations of all private and public, from primary to secondary schools.

Primary and elementary schools

- Agpalo Tutorial Center
- Agustin P. Navarra Elemenatary School
- Almon Primary School
- Balaring Elemenatary School
- BASIAO Elemenatary School
- Cabugao Elemenatary School
- Cudian Elemenatary School
- Catalino Andrada Memorial School
- Fundamental Baptist Learning Center
- Ivisan Elemenatary School
- Juan S. Jarencio Elemenatary School
- Mahayag Elementary School
- Malocloc Elemenatary School
- Panfilo Mendoza Elemenatary School
- PedAcademy Learning Center
- Purificacion A. Alagban Elemenatary School
- Tigis Primary School
- Victor A. Umiten Elemenatary School

Secondary schools

- Basiao National High School
- Ivisan National High School
- St. Vincent College of Business and Accountancy
