= Dumarao =

Municipality in Capiz, Philippines

- Municipality
- Municipality of Dumarao
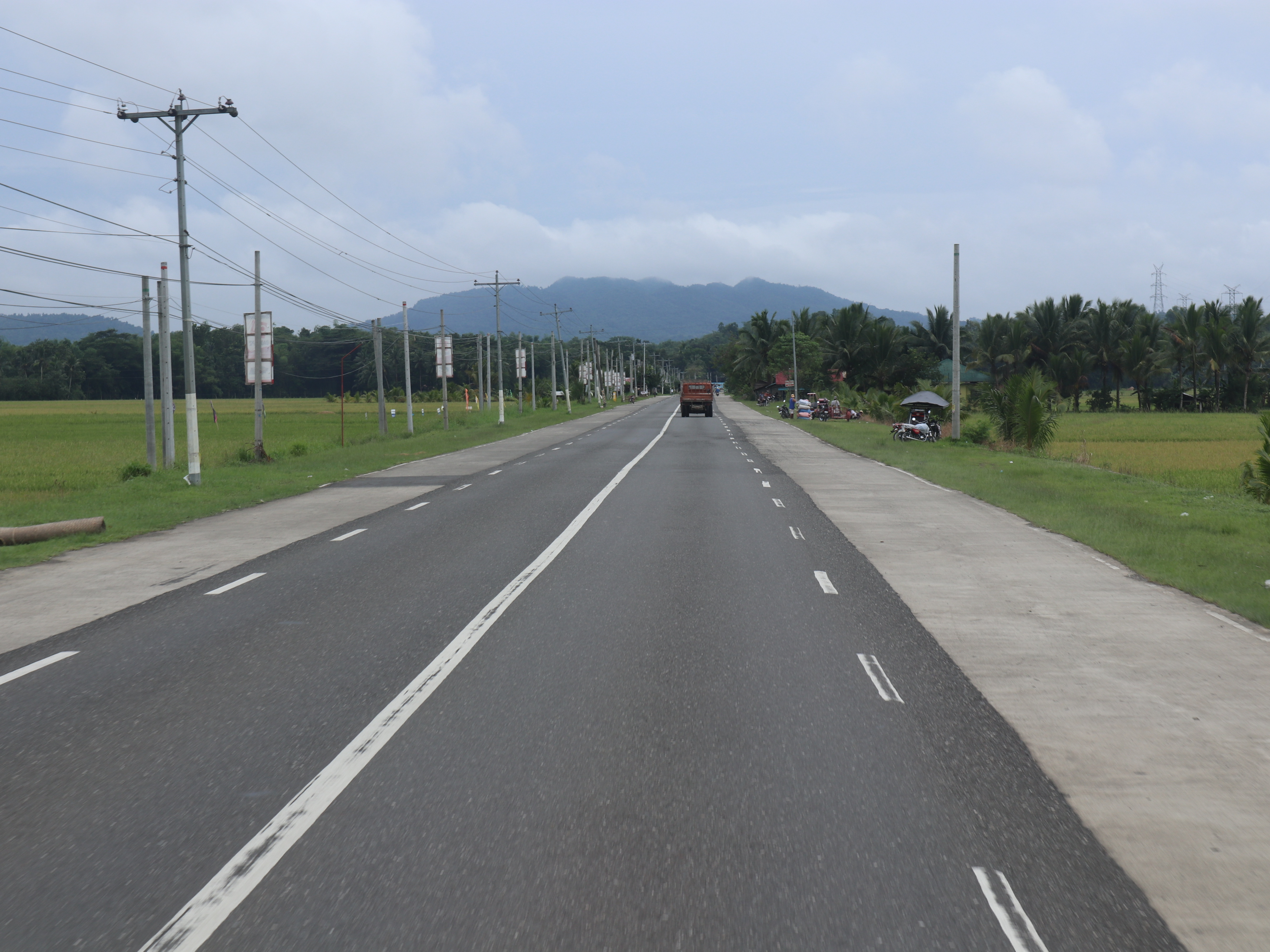

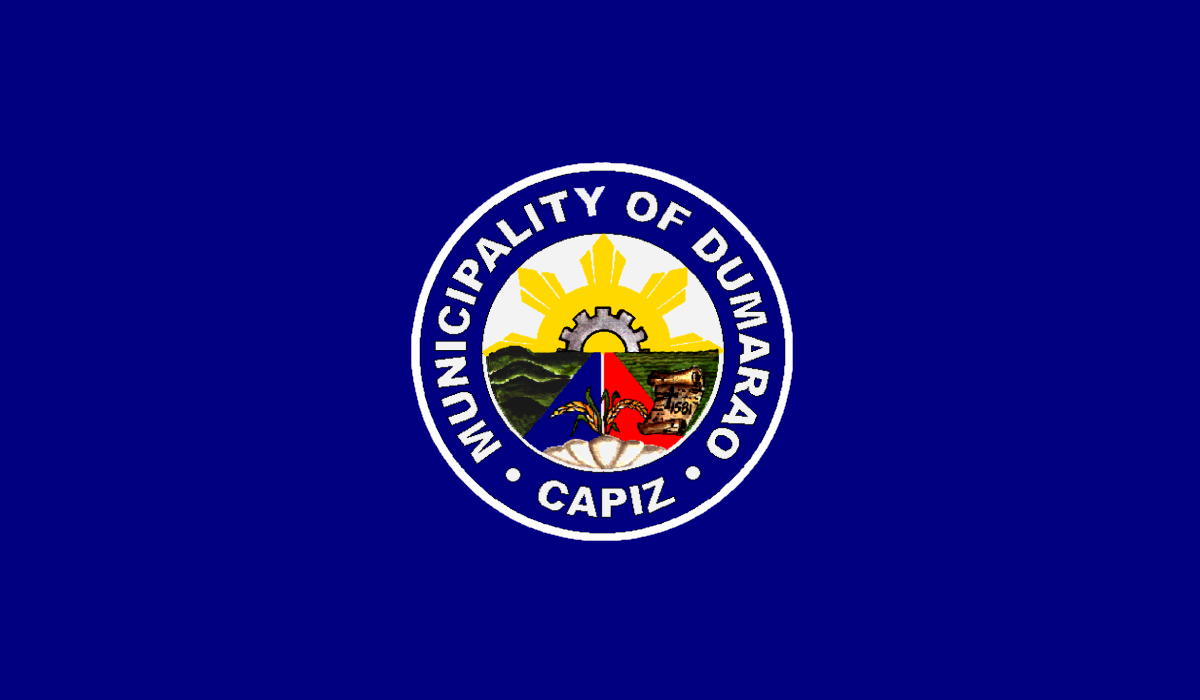
- Flag

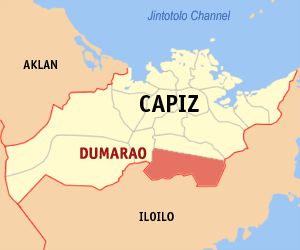
- Map of Capiz with Dumarao highlighted
- Interactive map of Dumarao
- Location within the Philippines
- Coordinates: 11°15′47″N 122°41′16″E
- Country: Philippines
- Region: Western Visayas
- Province: Capiz
- District: 2nd district
- Founded: 1581
- Barangays: 33 (see Barangays)

Government
  - Type: Sangguniang Bayan
  - Mayor: Mateo C. Hachuela (1Capiz)
  - Vice Mayor: Gleah Rose B. Hachuela (1Capiz)
  - Representative: Jane T. Castro (Lakas)
  - Municipal Council: Members: Dave Rainier G. Basiliano; Fernando P. Dorado, Jr.; Remelo M. Valenzuela; Karen G. Hallarda; Marcelo A. Irisari; Giovanne H. Hare; Sixto M. Castilla, Jr.; Alicia F. Farinas
  - Electorate: 32,218 voters (2025)

Area
  - Total: 232.56 km^{2} (89.79 sq mi)
- Elevation: 92 m (302 ft)
- Highest elevation: 577 m (1,893 ft)
- Lowest elevation: 0 m (0 ft)

Population (2024 census)
  - Total: 51,633
  - Density: 222.02/km^{2} (575.03/sq mi)
  - Households: 12,775

Economy
  - Income class: 1st municipal income class
  - Poverty incidence: 19.77% (2023)
  - Revenue: ₱ 237.2 million (2024)
  - Assets: ₱ 564.2 million (2024)
  - Expenditure: ₱ 98.3 million (2024)
  - Liabilities: ₱ 49.96 million (2024)

Service provider
  - Electricity: Capiz Electric Cooperative (CAPELCO)
- Time zone: UTC+8 (PST)
- ZIP code: 5812
- PSGC: 061904000
- IDD : area code: +63 (0)36
- Native languages: Karay-a; Capisnon; Hiligaynon; Ati; Tagalog
- Website: dumarao.com

Dumarao, officially the Municipality of Dumarao (Capiznon/Hiligaynon: Banwa sang Dumarao; Tagalog: Bayan ng Dumarao), is a municipality in the province of Capiz, Philippines. According to the 2024 census, it has a population of 51,633 people.

== History ==
It was founded in as a municipio 1581 and established by Spaniards under the advocacy of Our Lady of Snows.

Dumarao traces its earliest roots to Malay settlers who arrived by balangay and moved inland in search of fertile land. They first lived near the meeting point of the Badbaran and Panay rivers, relying on local forests and waterways for food and transport, before clearing the present town center.

During the revolution, local residents became involved after General Quintin Salas passed through in 1898, which led to arrests and later release of several townsmen.

Under American rule, a public school system was set up, the railway reached the town in 1909, and epidemics and storms marked the era. Political rivalry also began as elections shifted from council choice to popular voting.

Over time, Dumarao’s leaders built programs and projects that shaped the town, aiming for a community focused on growth, better living conditions, and care for its environment.

== Geography ==
It is 45 kilometres (28 mi) from Roxas City.

=== Barangays ===
Dumarao is politically subdivided into 33 barangays. Each barangay consists of puroks and some have sitios.

- Agbatuan
- Aglalana
- Aglanot
- Agsirab
- Alipasiawan
- Astorga
- Bayog
- Bungsuan
- Calapawan
- Codingle
- Cubi
- Dacuton
- Dangula
- Gibato
- Guinotos
- Jambad
- Janguslob
- Lawaan
- Malonoy
- Nagsulang
- Ongol Ilawod
- Ongol Ilaya
- Poblacion Ilawod
- Poblacion Ilaya
- Sagrada Familia
- Salcedo
- San Juan
- Sibariwan
- Tamulalod
- Taslan
- Tina
- Tinaytayan
- Traciano / Agsalay

=== Climate ===
Climate data for Dumarao, Capiz
Month	Jan	Feb	Mar	Apr	May	Jun	Jul	Aug	Sep	Oct	Nov	Dec	Year
Mean daily maximum °C (°F)	27 (81)	28 (82)	29 (84)	31 (88)	32 (90)	31 (88)	30 (86)	30 (86)	29 (84)	29 (84)	29 (84)	27 (81)	29 (85)
Mean daily minimum °C (°F)	23 (73)	23 (73)	23 (73)	24 (75)	25 (77)	25 (77)	24 (75)	24 (75)	24 (75)	24 (75)	24 (75)	23 (73)	24 (75)
Average precipitation mm (inches)	61 (2.4)	39 (1.5)	46 (1.8)	48 (1.9)	90 (3.5)	144 (5.7)	152 (6.0)	145 (5.7)	163 (6.4)	160 (6.3)	120 (4.7)	90 (3.5)	1,258 (49.4)
Average rainy days	12.3	9.0	9.9	10.0	18.5	25.0	27.4	26.0	25.9	24.9	17.9	14.2	221
Source: Meteoblue

== Demographics ==
Population census of Dumarao
Year	Pop.	±% p.a.
1903	5,479	—
1918	7,428	+2.05%
1939	14,298	+3.17%
1948	16,308	+1.47%
1960	19,231	+1.38%
1970	22,422	+1.55%
1975	27,338	+4.06%
1980	29,934	+1.83%
1990	36,801	+2.09%
1995	38,037	+0.62%
2000	40,303	+1.25%
2007	42,603	+0.77%
2010	43,986	+1.17%
2015	46,157	+0.92%
2020	49,506	+1.49%
2024	51,633	+1.02%
Source: Philippine Statistics Authority

In the 2024 census, the population of Dumarao was 51,633 people, with a density of 220 inhabitants per square kilometre or 570 inhabitants per square mile.

== Economy ==
Poverty incidence of Dumarao (%)

Source: Philippine Statistics Authority

== Education ==
The Dumarao Schools District Office governs all educational institutions within the municipality. It oversees the management and operations of all private and public, from primary to secondary schools.

Primary and elementary schools

- Agbatuan Elementary School
- Agmalate Elementary School
- Agsirab Elementary School
- Alipaciawan Elementary School
- Astorga Child Development Center
- Astorga Elementary School
- Badbaranan Elementary School
- Bungsu-an Elementary School
- Cabangahan Elementary School
- Calapawan Elementary School
- Codingle Elementary School
- Cubi Primary School
- Dacuton Elementary School
- Eduardo Abalo Sr. Elementary School
- Dumarao Central School
- Gibato Elementary School
- Guinotos Primary School
- Guiscan Primary School
- Heraclio M. Benjamin Elementary School
- Jambad Primary School
- Janguslob Elementary School
- Lawa-an Elementary School
- Malonoy Elementary School
- Nagsulang Elementary School
- Ongol Ilaya Primary School
- R. Advincula Sr. Elementary School
- Salcedo Elementary School
- San Juan Elementary School
- Sibariwan Elementary School
- Taslan Elementary School
- Tina Elementary School
- Tinaytayan Elementary School

Secondary schools

- Aglalana Integrated School
- Aglanot Integrated School
- Bungsuan National High School
- Estefania Montemayor National High School
- Manuel F. Onato National High School
- Presentacion Diez Gregorio National High School
- Ramon A. Benjamin Sr. National High School

Higher educational institution

- Capiz State University

== Notable personalities ==
- Warlito Cajandig (1944–2025), Catholic priest
- Ludovico Hidrosollo (1885–1962), Politician
