= Iloilo–Capiz Road =

Road in the Philippines

Iloilo–Capiz Road
- Iloilo East Coast - Capiz Road
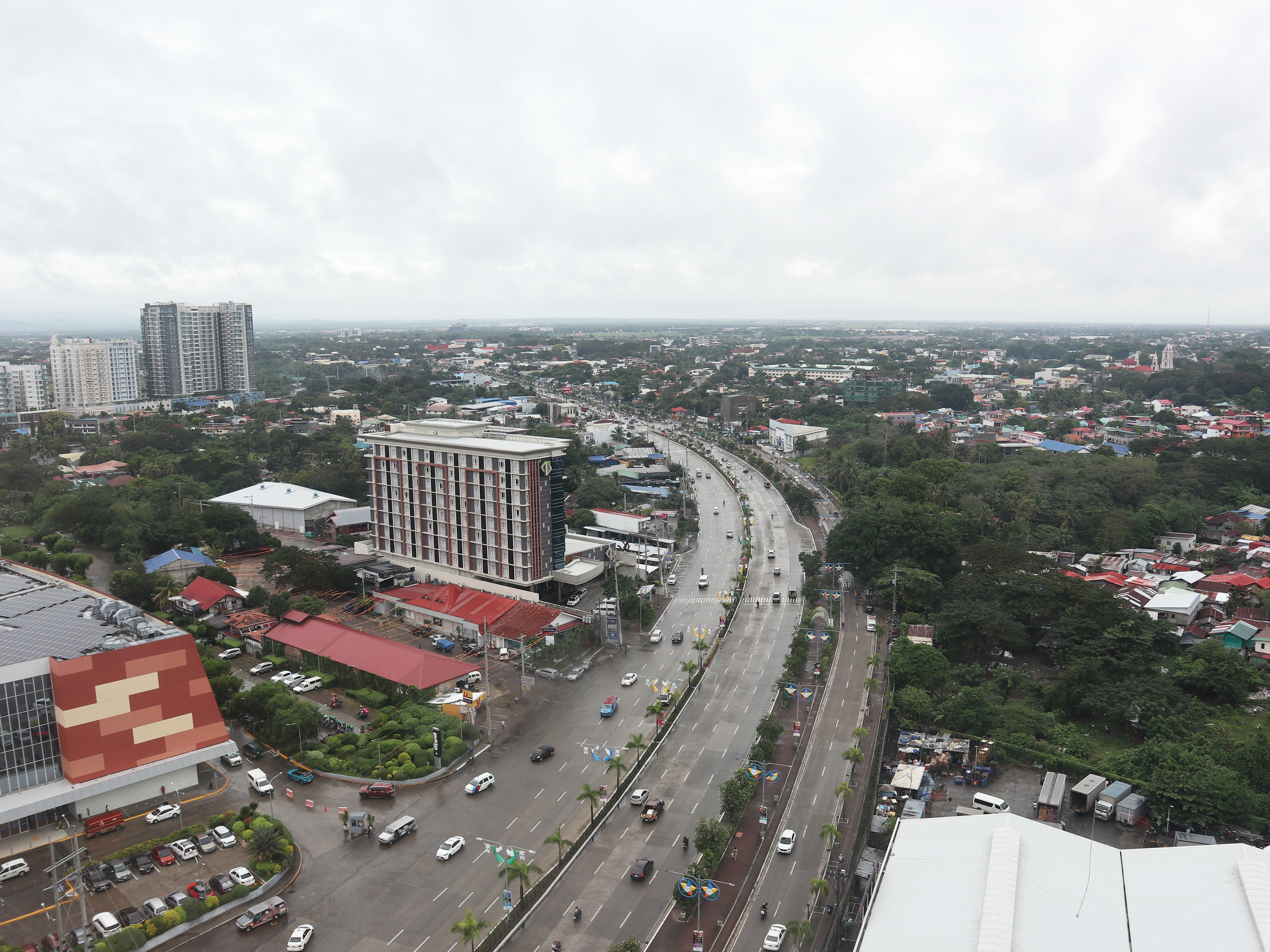
- Iloilo–Capiz Road, known as Senator Benigno S. Aquino Jr. Avenue in Iloilo City

Route information
- Maintained by Department of Public Works and Highways (DPWH)
- Length: 122.779 km (76.291 mi)
- Component highways: N5 from Iloilo City to Roxas; N505 in Roxas

Major junctions
- South end: N501 (Iloilo–Antique Road) in Iloilo City
- N5 (Mandurriao–Jaro Road) in Iloilo City; N5 (Jaro Spur Road) in Iloilo City; N512 (Old Iloilo–Capiz Road) in Iloilo City; N5 (Jaro Spur Road) in Iloilo City; N508 (Iloilo East Coast–Capiz Road) in Zarraga, Iloilo; N514 (Cabatuan–New Lucena–Banga–Bante Road) in Pototan, Iloilo; N510 (Passi–San Rafael–Lemery–Sara Road) / N512 (Passi–Calinog Road) in Passi; N506 (Cuartero–Tapulang–Maayon Road) in Cuartero, Capiz; N503 (Capiz–Aklan Road) in Ivisan, Capiz; N503 (Roxas–Cagay–Sibaguan–Balijuagan–Cudian–Ivisan Road) in Ivisan, Capiz; N505 (Iloilo East Coast–Capiz Road) in Roxas
- North end: Port of Culasi in Roxas

Location
- Country: Philippines
- Provinces: Iloilo, Capiz
- Major cities: Iloilo City, Passi, Roxas
- Towns: Leganes, Zarraga, Pototan, Dingle, Dueñas, San Enrique, Dumarao, Cuartero, Dumalag, Dao, Sigma, Ivisan

Highway system
- Roads in the Philippines; Highways; Expressways; List

The Iloilo–Capiz Road is a 122.779-kilometer (76.291 mi), north–south lateral highway that connects the city of Iloilo in the province of Iloilo to the city of Roxas in the province of Capiz, Philippines.

The road is a component of National Route 5 (N5) and National Route 505 (N505) of the Philippine highway network, as well as the Western Nautical Highway of the Philippine Nautical Highway System.

== Route description ==
=== Iloilo City to Passi ===
The road starts near the kilometer zero of Panay Island at Arroyo Fountain rotonda in Iloilo City Proper.

=== Ivisan to Roxas ===
From Ivisan poblacion, it turns east towards Roxas City. It then veers north towards the Roxas City downtown where the road becomes locally known as Km 3, Km2, Km1 then Roxas Avenue. It crosses the Panay River and meets the Roxas City Fountain roundabout, where it transitions from N5 to N505 and turns to the west. It turns north as its newer route, locally known as Arnaldo Boulevard, facilitating access to the Roxas Airport and Port of Culasi. It meets the northern coast of Panay Island and ends at the intersection with Roxas City Circumferential Road at the Port of Culasi.

== Intersections ==
Intersections are numbered by kilometer post, with Arroyo Fountain in front of Iloilo Provincial Capitol in Iloilo City designated as kilometer 0.

| Province | City/Municipality | km | mi | Destinations | Notes |
|---|---|---|---|---|---|
| Iloilo City | | | | N501 (Iloilo–Antique Road) | Southern terminus |
| Iloilo City | | | | La Paz–Granja Road | |
| Iloilo City | | | | Rizal Street | |
| Iloilo City | | | | N5 (Mandurriao–Jaro Road) | |
| Iloilo City | | | | N5 (Jaro Spur Road) | |
| Iloilo City | | | | N512 (Old Iloilo–Capiz Road) | |
| Iloilo City | | | | N5 (Jaro Spur Road) / Cubay–Balabago Road | |
| Iloilo | Leganes | | | Leganes–Santa Barbara Road | |
| Iloilo | Zarraga | | | N508 (Iloilo East Coast–Capiz Road) | |
| Iloilo | Pototan | | | N514 (Cabatuan–New Lucena–Banga–Bante Road) | |
| Iloilo | Pototan | | | Pototan–Mina–Janiuay Road / Banga–Polot-an–Pototan Road | |
| Iloilo | Pototan | | | Pototan–Tabugon Road | |
| Iloilo | Dingle | | | Pototan–Tabugon Road | |
| Iloilo | Dueñas | | | Dueñas Diversion Road | |
| Iloilo | Dueñas | | | Dueñas Diversion Road | |
| Iloilo | Passi | | | N510 (Passi–San Rafael–Lemery–Sara Road) / N512 (Passi–Calinog Road) | |
| Capiz | Dumarao | | | Dumarao–San Rafael Road | |
| Capiz | Dumarao | | | Ayuyan–Tinaytayan Road | |
| Capiz | Cuartero | | | N506 (Cuartero–Tapulang–Maayon Road) | |
| Capiz | Dao | | | Old Iloilo–Capiz Road | |
| Capiz | Dao | | | Dao Bypass Road | |
| Capiz | Sigma | | | Sigma–Mambusao–Jamindan Road | |
| Capiz | Sigma | | | Sigma–Mi-anay–Duyoc–Calaan–Panitan Road | |
| Capiz | Ivisan | | | N503 (Capiz–Aklan Road) | |
| Capiz | Ivisan | | | N503 (Roxas–Cagay–Sibaguan–Balijuagan–Cudian–Ivisan Road) | |
| Capiz | Roxas | | | N505 (Iloilo East Coast–Capiz Road) | Route number change from N5 to N505 |
| Capiz | Roxas | | | N503 (Roxas–Cagay–Sibaguan–Balijuagan–Cudian–Ivisan Road) | |
| Capiz | Roxas | | | San Roque–Baybay–Culasi Road | |
| Capiz | Roxas | | | Port of Culasi | Northern terminus |
1.000 mi = 1.609 km; 1.000 km = 0.621 mi

== Spurs and bypasses ==
=== Jaro Spur Road ===
Jaro Spur Road
- Jaro Bypass Road; Washington Street
- Location: Jaro, Iloilo City
- Length: 0.570 km (0.354 mi; 1,870 ft)

The Jaro Spur Road is a 0.570-kilometer (0.354 mi) spur road that serves as the main bypass road for Iloilo–Capiz Road in Jaro, Iloilo City.

==== Intersections ====
The entire route is located in Iloilo City. No kilometer posts were posted anywhere along the road.

| km | mi | Destinations | Notes |
|---|---|---|---|
| | | N5 (Iloilo–Capiz Road) | Southern terminus |
| | | N5 (Iloilo–Capiz Road) / Balabago Road | Northern terminus |
1.000 mi = 1.609 km; 1.000 km = 0.621 mi
