= N5 highway (Philippines) =

Road in the Philippines

Route 5

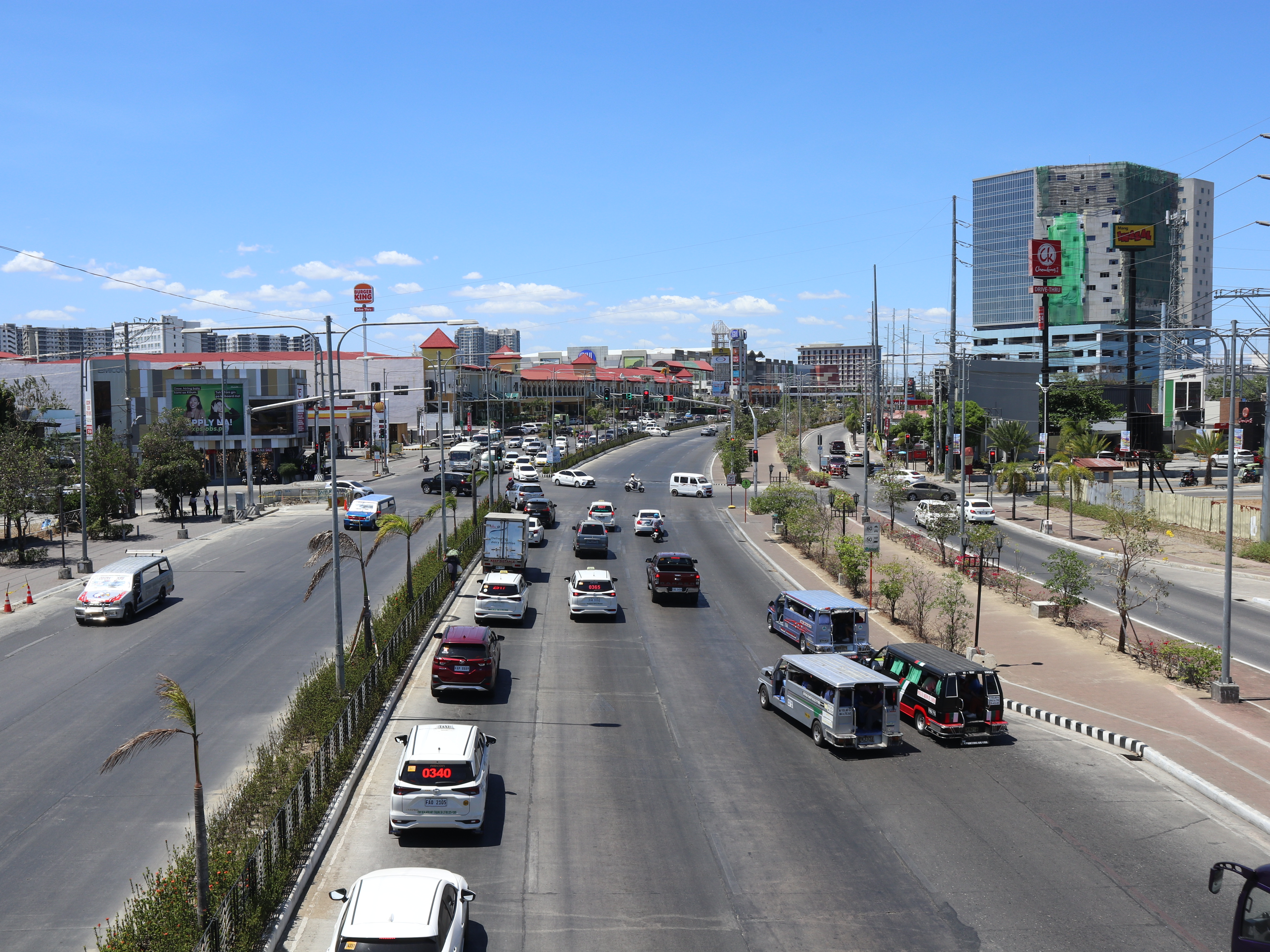
- N5 as Sen. Benigno S. Aquino Jr. Avenue (Diversion Road) in Mandurriao, Iloilo City

Route information
- Maintained by the Department of Public Works and Highways (DPWH)
- Length: 125 km (78 mi)

Major junctions
- North end: N505 (Roxas Avenue) in Roxas, Capiz
- N503 (Roxas City-Cagay-Sibaguan-Balijuagan-Cudian-Ivisan Road) in Ivisan; N503 (Capiz-Aklan Road) in Ivisan; N506 (Cuartero-Tapulang-Maayon Road) in Dumalag; N512 (Passi-Calinog Road) / N510 (Passi-San Rafael-Lemery-Sara Road) in Passi; N514 (Cabatuan-New Lucena-Banga-Bante Road) in Pototan; N508 (Iloilo East Coast-Capiz Road) in Zarraga; N516 (President Corazon C. Aquino Avenue) in Iloilo City; N512 (Lopez Jaena Street) in Iloilo City
- South end: N501 (Iloilo–Antique Road) in Iloilo City

Location
- Country: Philippines
- Provinces: Capiz, Iloilo
- Major cities: Roxas, Passi, Iloilo City
- Towns: Ivisan, Sigma, Dao, Dumalag, Cuartero, Dumarao, San Enrique, Dueñas, Dingle, Pototan, Zarraga, Leganes,

Highway system
- Roads in the Philippines; Highways; Expressways; List
← N4	→ N6

National Route 5 (N5) forms part of the Philippine highway network. It runs through the province of Capiz to the province of Iloilo, both in the island of Panay. It is the only national primary route in Panay.

== Route description ==
=== Roxas to Iloilo City ===
==== Iloilo–Capiz Road ====
N5 covers the section of Iloilo–Capiz Road from the Roxas City Fountain roundabout in Roxas City, Capiz to its southern terminus at Iloilo–Antique Road (locally known as General Luna Street) in Iloilo City.

==== Jaro Spur Road ====
N5 covers Jaro Spur Road (Washington Street), which carries northbound traffic from Jaro Plaza to Cubay-Balabago Road in Iloilo City, as the Iloilo–Capiz Road carries southbound traffic.

=== Branch in Iloilo City ===
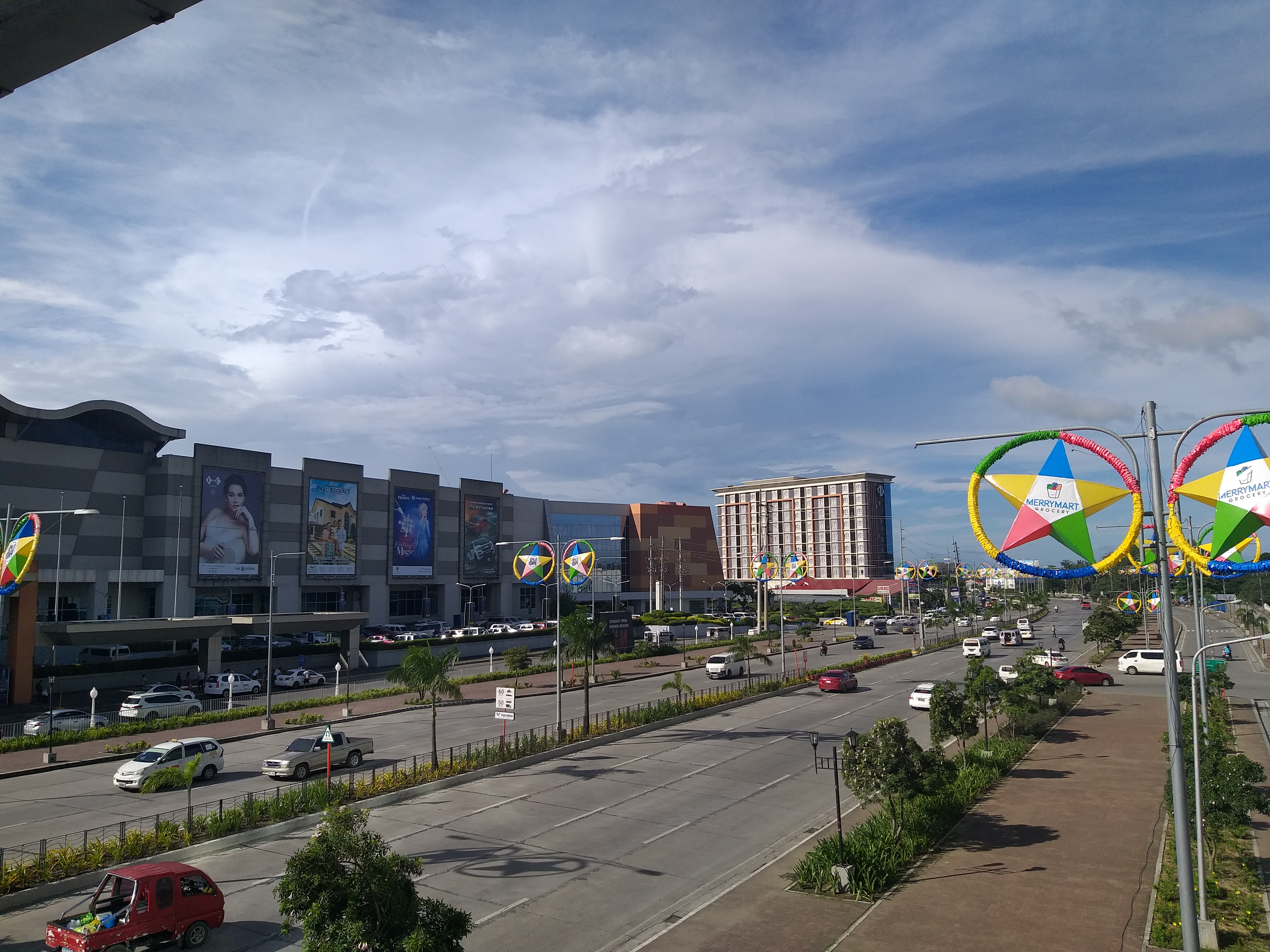
The section of Sen. Benigno S. Aquino Jr. Avenue (Diversion Road) that forms part of N5

N5's section that branches off from the old route of Iloilo–Capiz Road at Jaro Plaza covers Mandurriao-Jaro Road (EI98 Street) and the southern section of Sen. Benigno S. Aquino Jr. Avenue (Diversion Road). Just like the older route, it terminates at the Iloilo–Antique Road.
