= Casa Real de Iloilo =

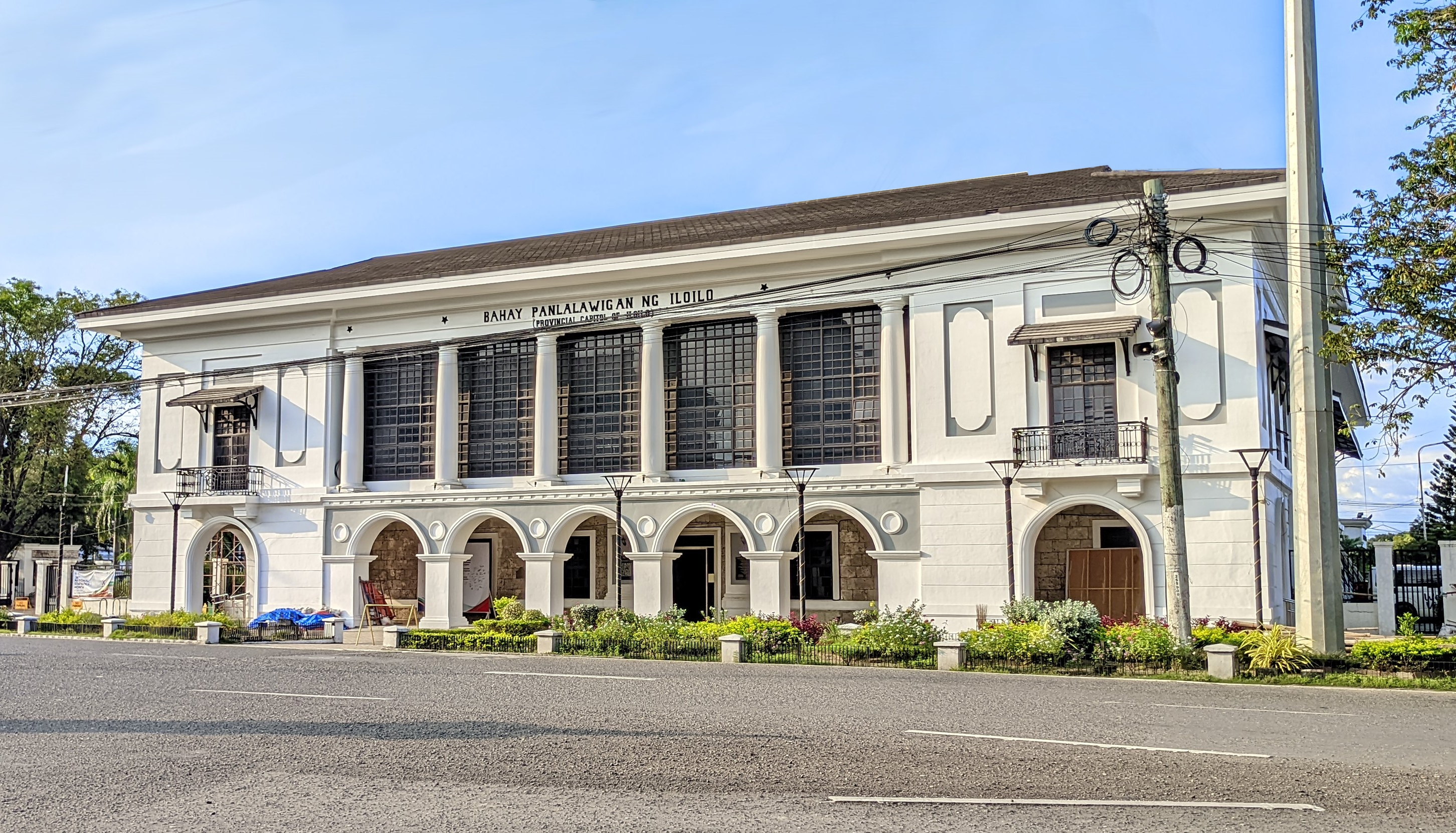
- Façade of Casa Real de Iloilo, November 2025.

- Location within Philippines
- Alternative names: Old Iloilo Provincial Capitol

General information
- Status: Fully restored
- Location: Iloilo City, Philippines
- Coordinates: 10.7019°N 122.5691°E
- Completed: 1869
- Renovated: 2015

Design and construction
- Designations: Important Cultural Property (December 17, 2020)

The Casa Real de Iloilo (transl. Royal House of Iloilo), also known as the Old Iloilo Provincial Capitol, was the seat of the provincial government of Iloilo in the Philippines since the Spanish colonial period until 2006. It was also the residence of the alcalde-mayor, presidente municipal, and governor, who held the highest authority as the Spanish official in Iloilo during the period. After the old Iloilo City Hall was donated to the University of the Philippines Visayas in 1947, Casa Real de Iloilo temporarily housed the offices of both the Iloilo City and provincial governments until the new Iloilo City Hall at Plaza Libertad was completed in 2011.

Constructed in 1869, it is considered the first provincial capitol building in the Philippines. It is located at the junction of General Luna Street and Muelle Loney Street in Iloilo City, standing next to the new Iloilo Provincial Capitol.

== History ==
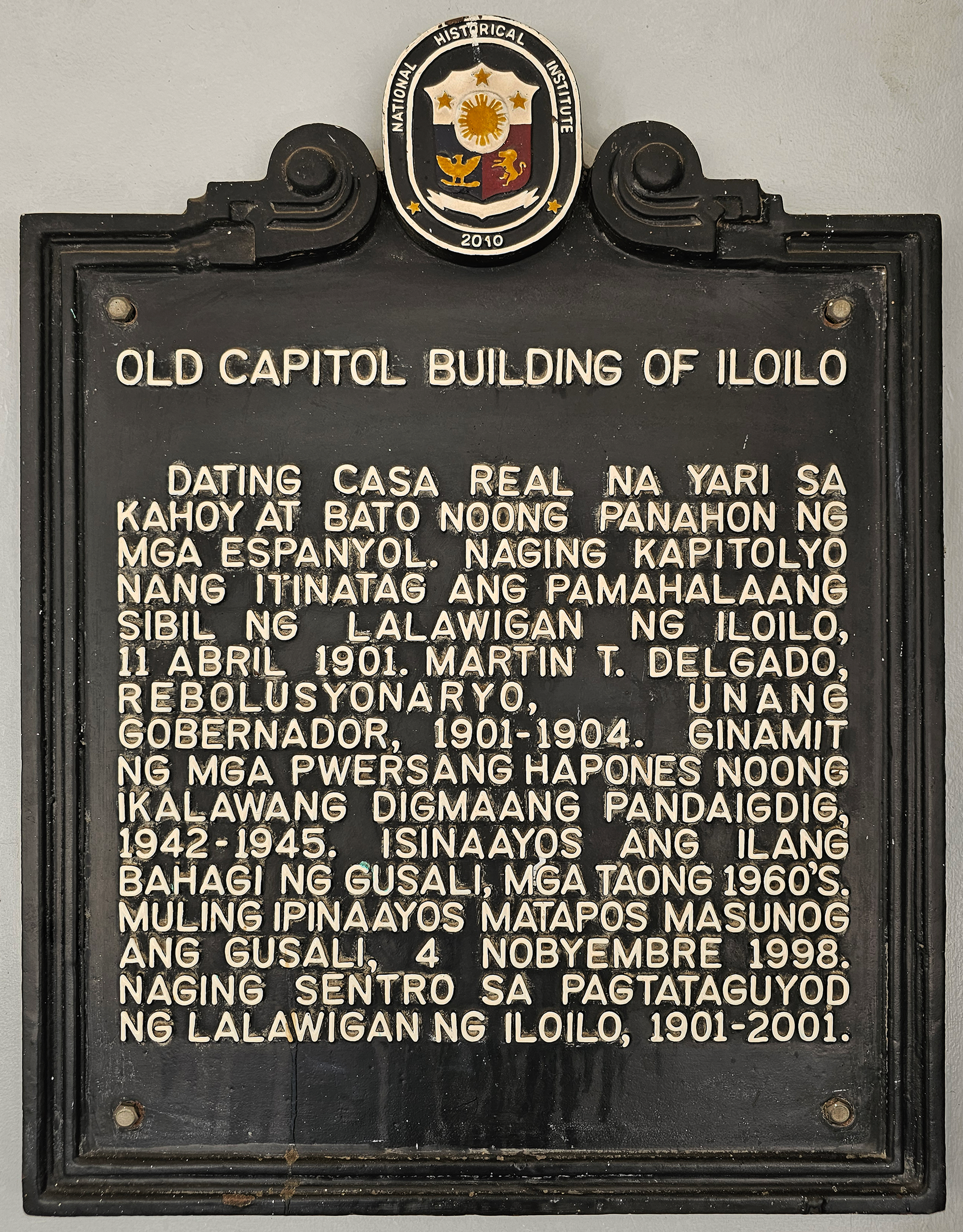
National historical marker installed in 2010

The Casa Real de Iloilo was originally a one-story stone building where the provincial government offices were located after its completion in 1869. Gov. Enrique Fajardo finished construction of the second story in 1873, with first-class wood and a galvanized iron roof. He was also the first governor to establish an official residence in what was at the time the biggest and most elegant provincial capitol in the Philippines. Two publications in Madrid hailed it as "the magnificent Casa Real" and "the best of its kind, the most commodious and largest in the Philippines."

On April 11, 1901, the U.S. Philippine Commission headed by William Howard Taft inaugurated the civil government of Iloilo and inducted Gen. Martin T. Delgado as the first provincial governor at the Casa Real. Seven years later, on December 27, 1907, Gov. Benito Lopez was assassinated in the same building. The Casa Real was renovated in 1910 and heavily damaged in World War II. A large annex was built after the war, but it was gutted by fire on November 4, 1998. As a result, the new Iloilo Provincial Capitol was constructed behind the building and was completed in 2006.

Casa Real de Iloilo now mostly serves as a venue for private parties, government functions, and cultural events. Governors held their inaugural and induction ceremonies at the Old Capitol.

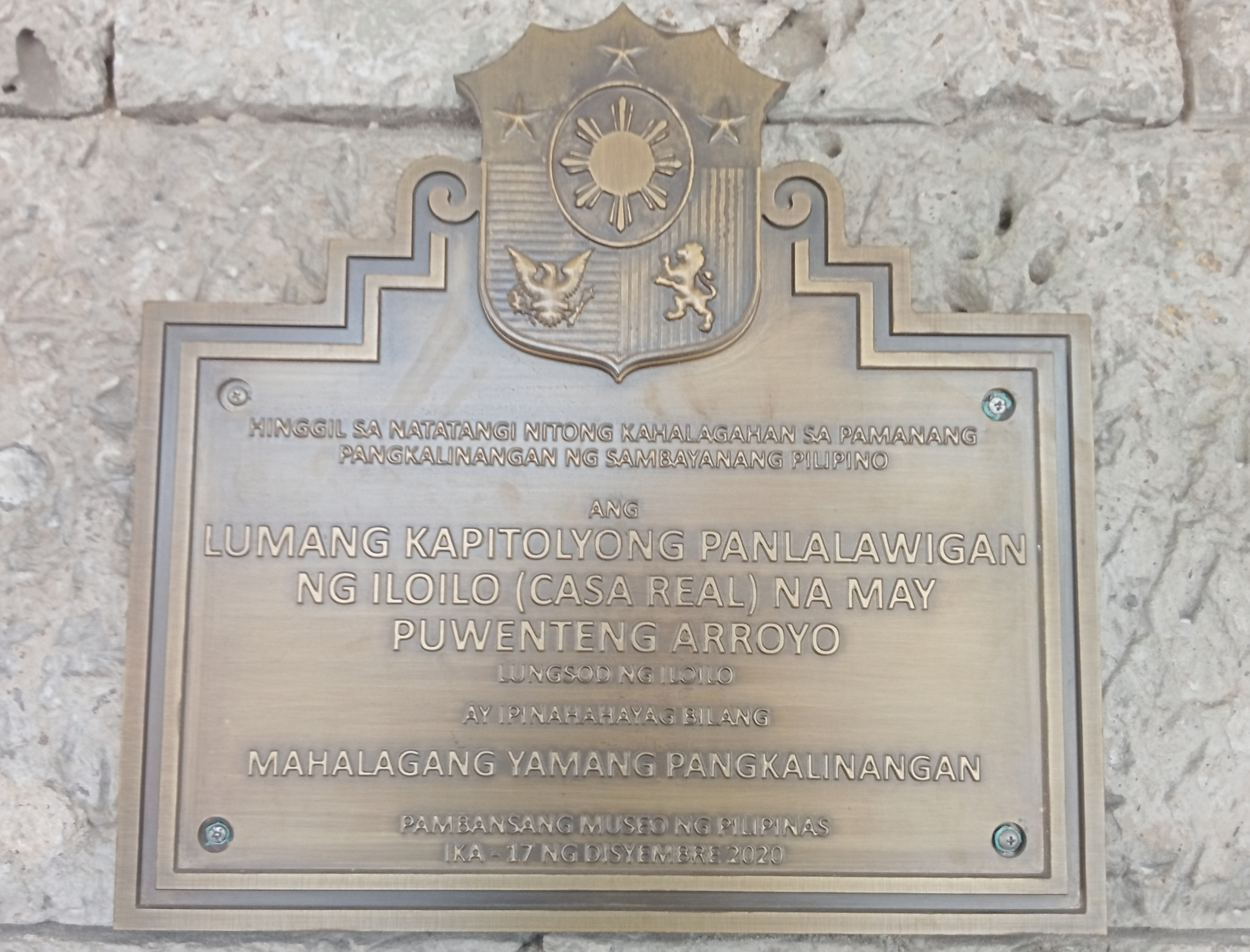
National Museum Important Cultural Property plaque

The National Historical Institute (NHI) formally recognized the Old Capitol as a historic site through a marker installed on its walls on April 11, 2010. It was restored in 2015 for the Independence Day celebration.

In 2022, the National Museum of the Philippines declared Casa Real de Iloilo, together with the Arroyo Fountain, an Important Cultural Property (ICP).

== Architecture ==
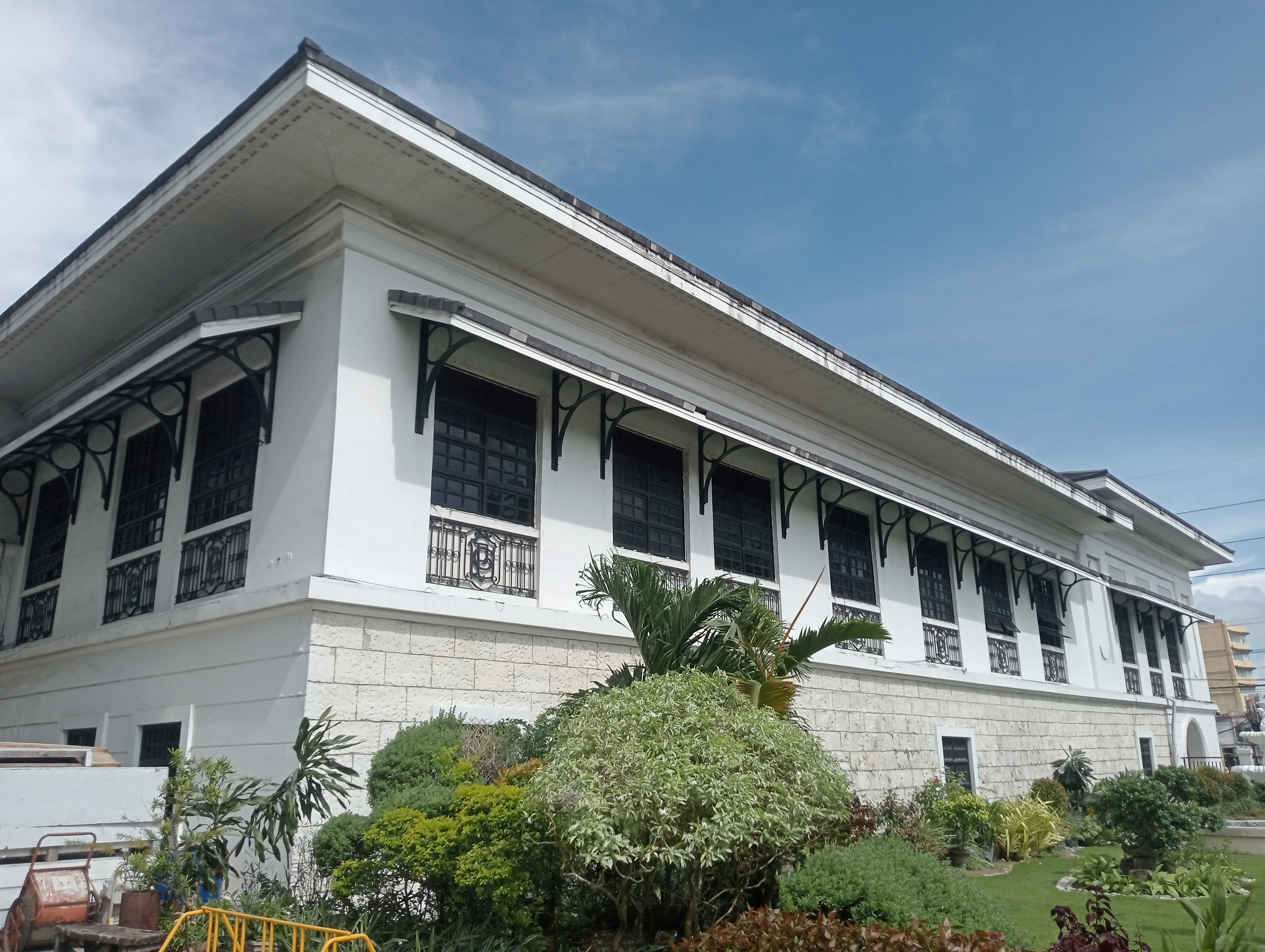
Close-up view of Casa Real, showcasing its bahay na bato architecture

The building's architecture initially adhered to the traditional Filipino bahay na bato style, characterized by a concrete ground floor and a wooden upper floor. This design included intricate interior details, a grand staircase, and spacious halls.

== See also ==
- Iloilo Provincial Capitol
