= Cuartero =

Municipality in Capiz, Philippines

- Municipality
- Municipality of Cuartero
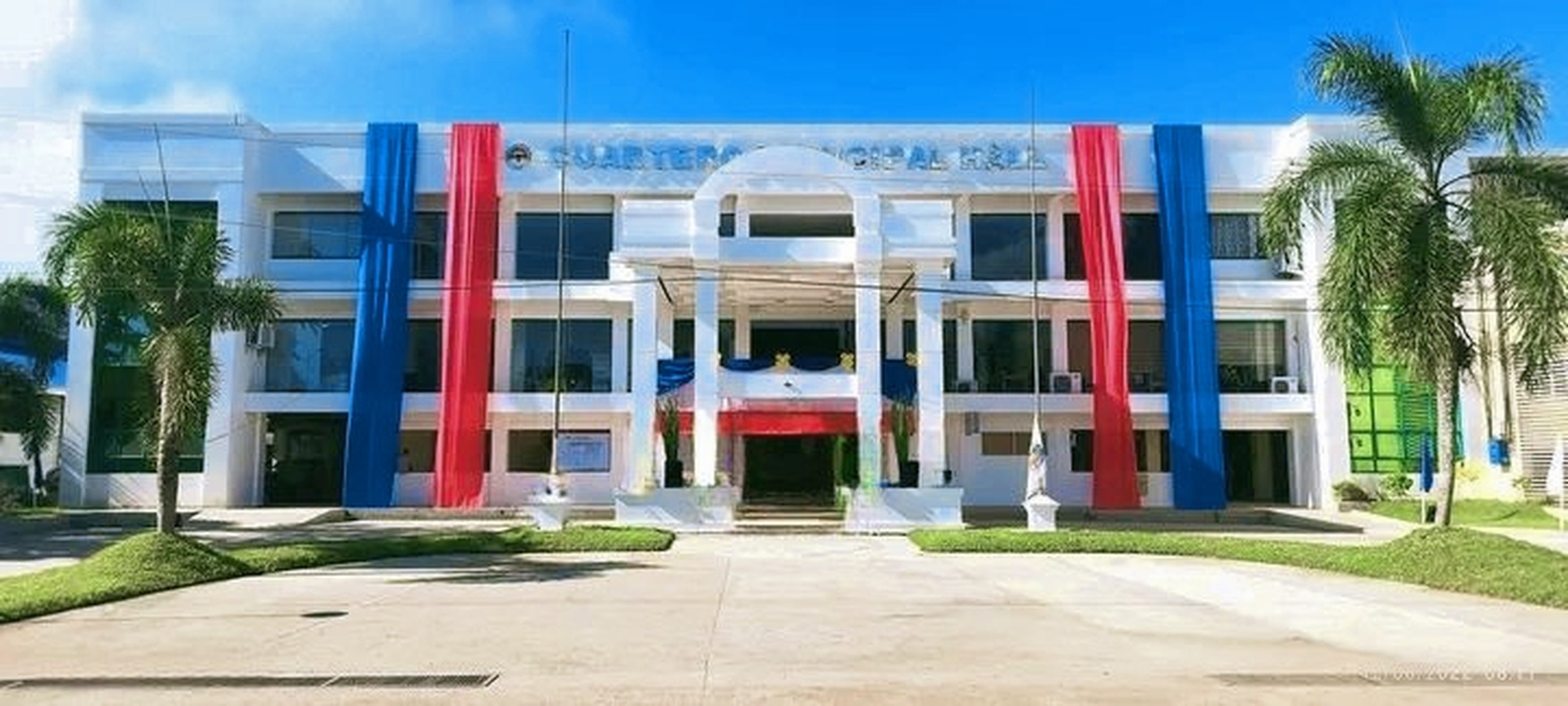
- Cuartero Municipal Hall

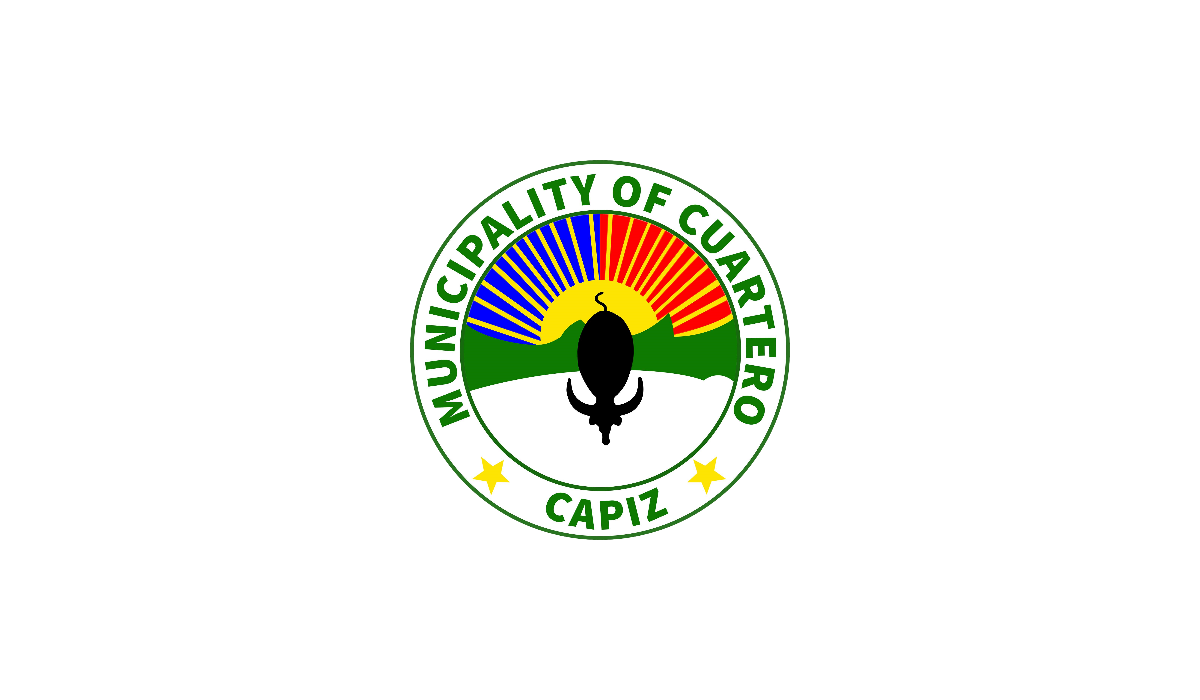
- Flag

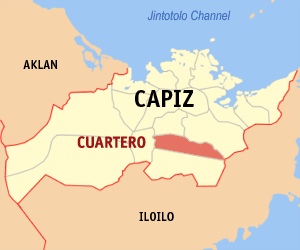
- Map of Capiz with Cuartero highlighted
- Interactive map of Cuartero
- Location within the Philippines
- Coordinates: 11°20′34″N 122°40′17″E
- Country: Philippines
- Region: Western Visayas
- Province: Capiz
- District: 2nd district
- Founded: January 1, 1939
- Named for: Mariano Cuartero
- Barangays: 22 (see Barangays)

Government
  - Type: Sangguniang Bayan
  - Mayor: Stephen Chris E. Openiano (1Capiz)
  - Vice Mayor: Abner V. Falcis (1Capiz)
  - Representative: Jane T. Castro (Lakas)
  - Electorate: 20,235 voters (2025)

Area
  - Total: 106.58 km^{2} (41.15 sq mi)
- Elevation: 78 m (256 ft)
- Highest elevation: 520 m (1,710 ft)
- Lowest elevation: 0 m (0 ft)

Population (2024 census)
  - Total: 28,650
  - Density: 268.8/km^{2} (696.2/sq mi)
  - Households: 7,093

Economy
  - Income class: 3rd municipal income class
  - Poverty incidence: 15.48% (2023)
  - Revenue: ₱ 160.5 million (2024)
  - Assets: ₱ 420 million (2024)
  - Expenditure: ₱ 58.75 million (2024)
  - Liabilities: ₱ 63.55 million (2024)

Service provider
  - Electricity: Capiz Electric Cooperative (CAPELCO)
- Time zone: UTC+8 (PST)
- ZIP code: 5811
- PSGC: 061901000
- IDD : area code: +63 (0)36
- Native languages: Capisnon; Hiligaynon; Tagalog
- Website: www.cuartero.gov.ph

Cuartero, officially the Municipality of Cuartero (Capiznon/Hiligaynon: Banwa it Cuartero; Tagalog: Bayan ng Cuartero), is a municipality in the province of Capiz, Philippines. According to the 2024 census, it has a population of 28,650 people.

== Etymology ==
The town was named in honor of Mariano Cuartero, O.P. (1851–1884), the first bishop of the Diocese of Jaro, who helped expand ecclesiastical administration across Panay Island during Spanish rule.

== History ==
=== Early history ===
According to community oral traditions, the area now known as Cuartero was once called Binudhian, later Mapanag after a nearby creek (11°20'16.79"N 122°39'45.00"E). Early inhabitants were mainly Aetas who practiced subsistence farming and hunting.

=== Spanish colonial era ===
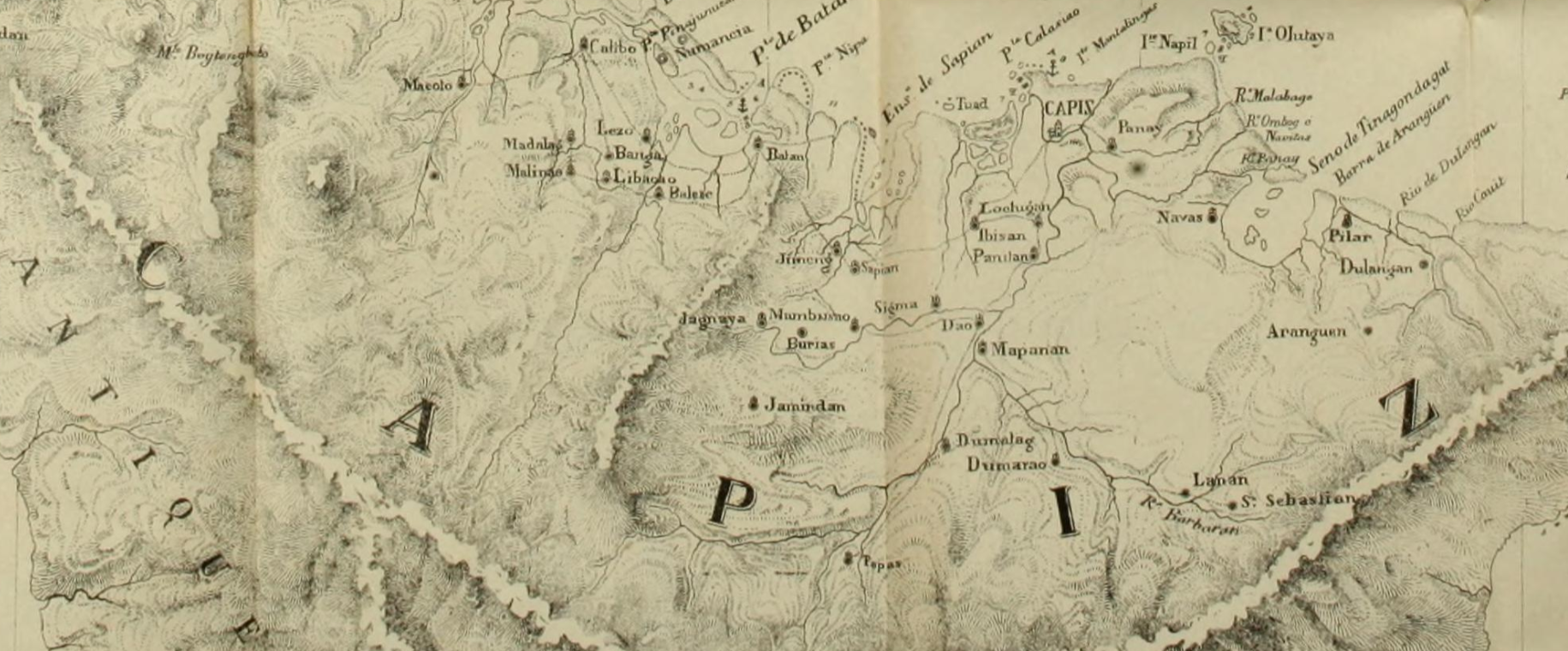
Mapanan as mentioned in the 1876 Historia geográfica, geológica y estadiśtica de Filipinas, Manila

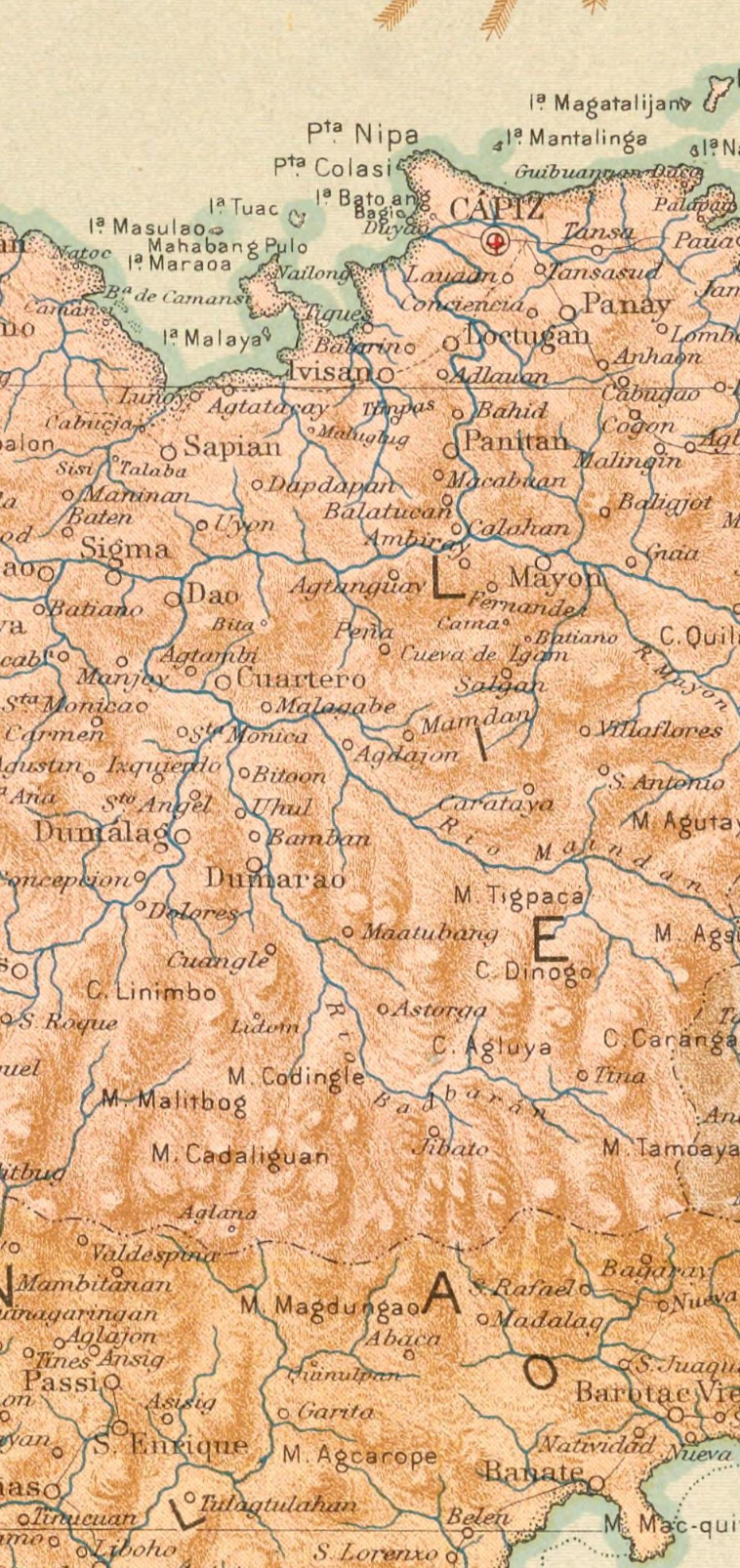
Cuartero as mentioned in the 1899 Atlas de Filipinas.

During this period, a place called Mapanag was originally in the map where the current town is located. The word Mapanag (on map) or Mapanan (in text) was mentioned in 1876 colonial gazetteer by the Spanish authorities where it was also described as a place prone to severe storms and once as a location for sugar mills.

The then town that was founded by Don Anacleto Habana was organized as a parish on November 30, 1872 under the parochial church of Dumarao and named Cuartero in honor of Bishop Mariano Cuartero, the first bishop of Jaro, Iloilo. A stone church and convent were erected under Spanish supervision, marking the start of formal administration and evangelization. In succeeding publications such as the 1899 Atlas de Filipinas, Mapanag was replaced by or referred as Cuartero.

=== American colonial era ===
By the early 1900s, under American rule, schools and civil institutions were introduced. In 1903, Cuartero became an arrabal of Dao under Act No. 720, where all personal and real estate taxes were paid. After many decades of effort to gain independence, leaders Manuel Funa and Pascual de la Torre traveled to Manila with complete documents for separation. Their work led President Manuel L. Quezon to approve Executive Order No. 159 on August 23, 1938, which established Cuartero as an independent municipality.

Cuartero was officially inaugurated as an independent municipality on January 1, 1939 with Manuel Funa as its first mayor. The agricultural sector centered on rice, corn, and sugarcane, which became its economic base.

=== Japanese occupation ===
World War II brought occupation and hardship, but local resistance groups helped secure liberation in 1945. In the post-war decades, Cuartero rebuilt rapidly, expanding education, health, and infrastructure.

=== Martial law under Ferdinand Marcos ===
During this period, the municipality is one of the few towns in the province where resistance to the regime have been documented. The Federation of Ilonggo Students known as FIST, a group known for organizing, “teach-ins” or discussions and demonstrations that drew thousands of students has a chapter in the municipality. Additionally, Elma Villaron, known as Dalama, a champion for the rights of her community, the Sulod-Bukidnon of Panay found herself in the municipality where she helped organize peasant communities along with the neighboring town of Maayon.

=== Present ===
Today, Cuartero remains a third-class agricultural municipality covering 106.58 km² and home to nearly 28 thousand residents.

== Geography ==
Cuartero lies about 37 kilometres (23 mi) from Roxas City. It is a landlocked town surrounded by the municipalities of Dao, Dumalag, Dumarao, and Maayon.

=== Barangays ===
Cuartero is politically subdivided into 22 barangays. Each barangay consists of puroks, and some have sitios.

- Agcabugao
- Agdahon
- Agnaga
- Angub
- Balingasag
- Bito-on Ilawod
- Bito-on Ilaya
- Bun-od
- Carataya
- Lunayan
- Mahunodhunod
- Maindang
- Mainit
- Malagab-i
- Nagba
- Poblacion Ilawod
- Poblacion Ilaya
- Poblacion Takas
- Puti-an
- San Antonio
- Sinabsaban
- Mahabang Sapa

=== Climate ===
Climate data for Cuartero, Capiz
Month	Jan	Feb	Mar	Apr	May	Jun	Jul	Aug	Sep	Oct	Nov	Dec	Year
Mean daily maximum °C (°F)	27 (81)	28 (82)	29 (84)	31 (88)	32 (90)	31 (88)	30 (86)	30 (86)	29 (84)	29 (84)	29 (84)	27 (81)	29 (85)
Mean daily minimum °C (°F)	23 (73)	23 (73)	23 (73)	24 (75)	25 (77)	25 (77)	24 (75)	24 (75)	24 (75)	24 (75)	24 (75)	23 (73)	24 (75)
Average precipitation mm (inches)	61 (2.4)	39 (1.5)	46 (1.8)	48 (1.9)	90 (3.5)	144 (5.7)	152 (6.0)	145 (5.7)	163 (6.4)	160 (6.3)	120 (4.7)	90 (3.5)	1,258 (49.4)
Source: Meteoblue (modelled data)

== Demographics ==
Population census of Cuartero
Year	Pop.	±% p.a.
1939	10,775	—
1948	9,985	−0.84%
1960	11,534	+1.21%
1970	14,497	+2.31%
1980	18,513	+2.48%
1990	22,597	+2.01%
2000	24,286	+0.72%
2010	25,456	+0.47%
2015	27,408	+1.42%
2020	28,650	+0.94%
Source: Philippine Statistics Authority

As of the 2024 census, the population was 28,650 people, with a density of 270 inhabitants per square kilometre or 700 inhabitants per square mile.

== Economy ==
Poverty incidence of Cuartero (%)

Source: Philippine Statistics Authority

== Culture ==
=== Events ===
The Agdahanay Festival is the official town festival of Cuartero, celebrated annually during the second week of June, culminating on June 13 in honor of the town’s patron saint, St. Anthony of Padua (San Antonio de Padua).

The term Agdahanay is derived from the Hiligaynon word meaning inviting and accommodating others, reflecting the Cuarteronhons’ tradition of hospitality and unity. The festival includes street dancing, trade fairs, sports events, and other community activities.

Cuartero celebrates its Foundation Day every August 23, marking its establishment as a municipality by Manuel L. Quezon through Executive Order No. 159 in 1938. The day commemorates separation of the then barrios of Cuartero, Agdajon, Angub, Bito-on, Bun-od, Carataya, Maindang, Malagab-i, Nagba, San Antonio, and Sinabsaban from Dao to form an independent municipality under the name of Cuartero. The celebration features civic parades, sports and cultural programs, and recognition ceremonies for residents who contributed to the town’s progress.

The founding anniversary is marked by civic parades, sports and cultural programs, and recognition ceremonies honoring outstanding residents. Recent celebrations have been accompanied by Hinugyaw sa Cuartero, a festival showcasing local achievements, industries, and traditions. The event commemorates the founding leaders of the municipality, beginning with its first municipal mayor, Manuel Funa, and highlights the town’s continued development since its establishment. Together, the Agdahanay Festival and Foundation Day form the municipality pillars of cultural calendar - one emphasizing faith and hospitality, the other civic pride and history.

=== Cuisine ===
There are several restaurants serving dishes that are popular to locals and tourist alike. Pednor Kandingan and Manokan is a Filipino restaurant known for native fried chicken and goat kaldereta. It is often recognized for authentic Capiz cuisine.

== Tourism ==
=== Torre ni Bobby ===
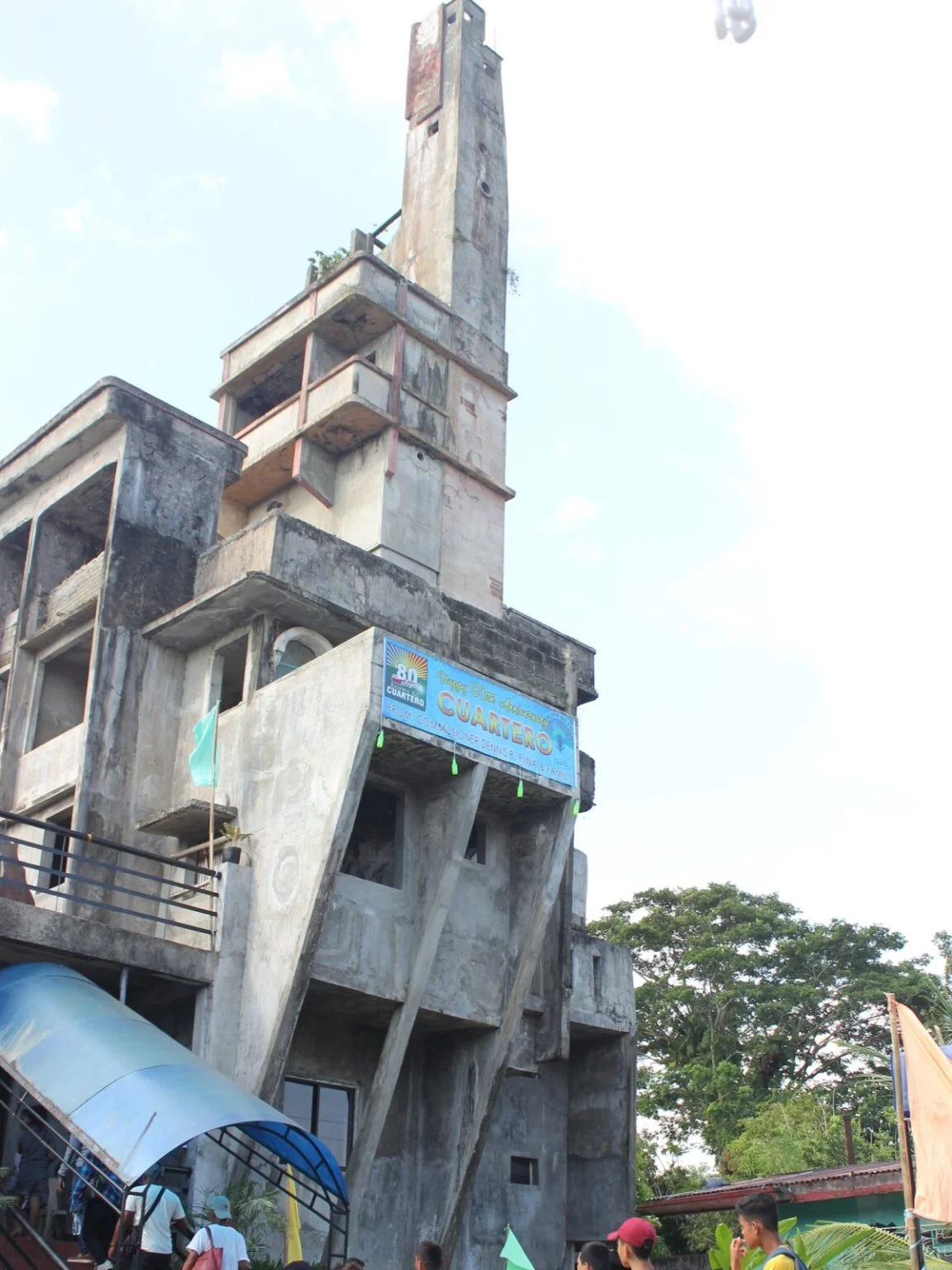
Picture of the tower.

This 12-story landmark located in the town proper was built in 1950. The structure is renowned for its eccentric, rustic design and for surviving major typhoons is the testament to the durability of its construction materials.

=== Capiz Ecology Park and Cultural Village ===
A 14-hectare eco-tourism destination located in Brgy. Nagba which focuses on Aeta culture, heritage preservation, and traditional Filipino living. "Balay-balay" is a program offering interactive tours featuring traditional weaving, indigenous cooking, and cultural performances. The park has been featured in a local travel documentary such as Biyahe ni Drew.

== Government ==
The municipality is governed by the mayor and sangguniang bayan, a municipal council.

=== List of Municipal Mayors ===
Term	Mayor	Notes
1939	Manuel Funa	Inaugural mayor; secured municipal status.
Jul 2004 - Jun 2007	Roger F. Flores	First term as the municipal mayor.
Jul 2007 - Jun 2010	Roger F. Flores	Second term as the municipal mayor.
Jul 2010 - Jun 2013	Roger F. Flores	Third and last term as municipal mayor. Listed in the DBM 2012 Local Government Directory.
Jul 2013 - Jun 2016	Tito L. Mayo	First term as the municipal mayor.
Jul 2016 - Jun 2019	Tito L. Mayo	Second term as the municipal mayor.
Jul 2019 - Jun 2022	Tito L. Mayo	Third and last term as municipal mayor.
Jul 2022 - Aug 2023	Joemarie H. Openiano	Served until his passing; succeeded by Vice Mayor Mayo.
Aug 2023 - Jun 2025	Tito L. Mayo	Assumed office after Openiano’s death. Perpetually disqualified to hold a public office as of February 2025 Ombudsman ruling.
Jul 2025 - present	Stephen Chris E. Openiano	Current mayor; deck officer turned politician after the passing of his father; elected with 57.6 % of votes in 2025.

== Education ==
The Cuartero Schools District Office governs all educational institutions within the municipality. It oversees the management and operations of all private and public, from primary to secondary schools.

=== Public Elementary Education ===
- Agcabugao Elementary School
- Agdahon Elementary School
- Agnaga Elementary School
- Angub Elementary School
- Balingasag Elementary School
- Bito-on Elementary School
- Bun-od Elementary School
- Carataya Elementary School
- Cuartero Central Elementary School
- Lunayan Elementary School
- Mahabang Sapa Elementary School
- Mahunodhunod Elementary School
- Maindang Elementary School
- Mainit Elementary School
- Malagab-i Elementary School
- Nagba Elementary School
- Putian Elementary School
- San Antonio Elementary School
- Sinabsaban Elementary School
- Vicente F. Fabuna Elementary School (Bito-on Ilaya)

=== Public Secondary Education ===
- Cuartero National High School
- Maindang National High School
- Putian National High School
- San Antonio National High School

=== Private Education ===
- Brighter Horizon Learning Center
- Golden Field Christian Learning Center
- St. Anthony of Padua Parochial School
- Shin Hyun Christian Academy

== Transportation ==
The municipality has access to major cities (Roxas City, Iloilo City, Kalibo) through highway, bypass road, and expressway. Motorized tricycle is the most common mode of transportation within the town proper and its barangays.

=== Iloilo-Capiz Road ===
The Iloilo-Capiz Road is 122.779-kilometer (76.291 mi) highway that connects the municipality to the provincial capital Roxas City and Iloilo province.

=== Iloilo-Capiz-Aklan Expressway (ICAEX) ===
The 210-kilometer (130 mi) expressway also known as Panay Expressway connects the municipality to the provinces of Iloilo and Aklan.

=== Maayon Bypass Road ===
This is a 1.22-kilometer road project that has been completed by the Department of Public Works and Highways (DPWH) to reduce travel time and improve connectivity between the municipality and the 1st district of Capiz. This infrastructure decongests major traffic areas, enhancing travel between barangays and neighboring towns.

=== Panay Railways ===
The municipality is also one of the towns with a station (Brgy. Angub) from the original route of Panay line of the Panay Railways.

== Notable people ==
=== Antonio Habana y Villagracia ===
He was born on March 6, 1864, in what was known as the town of Cuartero, founded by his father, Don Anacleto Habana, and that was merged with Dao during that period. He studied at the Ateneo de Manila, run by the Jesuit Fathers. On April 6, 1901, he was elected presidente municipal of Cápiz (now Roxas City), the first to hold this position following the establishment of civil rule during the current American occupation. He was twice elected councilman in the same municipality, and later, on February 5, 1906, he was elected provincial governor, being re-elected on November 5, 1907. Upon the creation of the provincial appraiser's office, he was the first to hold this position, from August 16, 1913, until September 30, 1918, when he resigned after being nominated as the official candidate of the Nacionalista Party for representative of the first district of the province of Cápiz. He was elected to the 5th Philippine Legislature where he obtained 3,633 votes against 2,551 for his opponent, José M. Hontiveros, a Democrat and former provincial governor.
