= Pierre Patricio =

Pierre Farum Patricio (born February 20, 1960, in Dumalag, Capiz, Philippines) is a Filipino self-taught visual artist. He is known for exhibiting extensively in his home country and internationally, and for representing the Philippines in the first two editions of the United Buddy Bears World Tour Exhibition.

== Career ==
Pierre Patricio is a contemporary painter, sculptor and illustrator from Western Visayas. The second of four siblings, he has shown interest in the visual arts scene from an early age competing in major art competitions throughout his elementary and secondary school years. He has been painting professionally since 1993.

Having lived and worked as an expatriate artist in Greece, Germany, Ireland and Singapore, he has exhibited in major cities across Europe and Asia. Since his first exhibition in Athens (1995), his artworks have been showcased in venues such as the Philippine Department of Foreign Affairs (in cooperation with the National Centennial Commission) in 1998, the Philippine Embassy Chancery in Brussels (2000), the University of Hamburg (2002), the Kurhaus in Bad Homburg vor der Höhe, Hesse, Germany (2003), Museo Iloilo (2006), Bacolod's Museo Negrense De La Salle (2008), Dublin's Hainault House (2010), Latvia's Art Museum Riga Bourse and the Philippine Embassy Chancery in Stockholm (2011), Singapore's The Arts House at the Old Parliament (2013) and Seoul's The Space Gallery (2014).

He has designed several landmark sculptures for the German company Buddy Bär Berlin GmbH in Berlin, a concept developed by Klaus and Eva Herlitz, and has represented the Philippines in the first two editions of the United Buddy Bears World Tour Exhibition, which is carried out in aid of UNICEF and other relief organizations traveling across six (6) continents since its launching in 2002. His paintings and sculptures are in private and public collections throughout Asia, Europe, North America and the Middle East.

=== Philanthropy ===
Many of Patricio's artworks have been occasionally pledged for charitable causes both in the Philippines and overseas, among them fundraising activities in cooperation with leading philanthropic organizations like ANCOP-Gawad Kalinga in Germany and the Philippines, Singapore's Dover Park Hospice, the Very Special Arts and Teen Challenge, and the South Korea-based Global Fashion for Development. Many of his artistic engagements with Buddy Bär Berlin GmbH have benefited development projects in Africa.

== Personal life and education ==
As the second son of Emerson Bereber Patricio, a sugar technologist, and Teresita Castro Farum, a public school teacher, Patricio was born in Dumalag, Capiz but spent most of his adolescent life in the coastal town of Pilar where is father was a landowner and agriculturist working for the Philippine Sugar Commission.

He was sent to college in Iloilo City to study Civil Engineering initially at the Western Institute of Technology but later completed a bachelor's degree in Marine Transportation at the Iloilo Maritime Academy (now the John B. Lacson Foundation Maritime University-Arevalo).

In 1982, he worked as a geological draftsman for the Azure Mining Corporation in Pilar before working overseas as a seafarer for several shipping companies in Japan. He then took up figurative drawing lessons in 1993 under Lou Efsthatiou at the Hellenic American Union in Athens upon deciding to pursue a full-time career in the visual arts.

He has been married to a Filipino diplomat since 1987 and has two children.

== See also ==
- Arts of the Philippines
