= Dueñas Church =

Church in Iloilo, Philippines

- Saint Jerome Parish Church
- Parokya ni San Geronimo (Filipino)
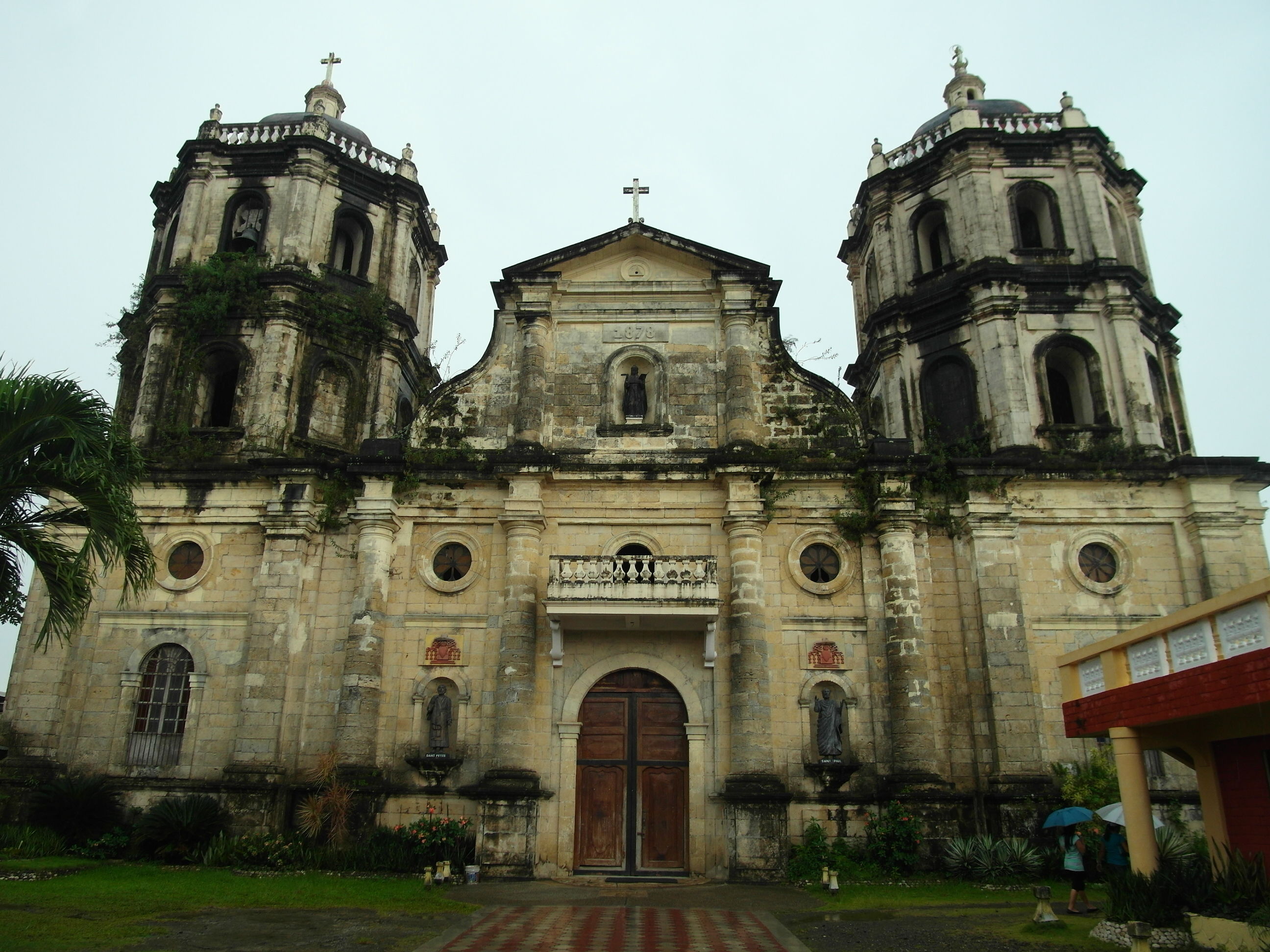
- The church's façade in 2011.

- Location in the Visayas Location in the Philippines
- 11.06616°N 122.61818°E
- Location: Dueñas, Iloilo
- Country: Philippines
- Denomination: Roman Catholic

History
- Status: Parish church
- Founded: 1590; 436 years ago
- Dedication: Saint Jerome

Architecture
- Functional status: Active
- Architectural type: Church building
- Style: Tuscan
- Completed: 1884; 142 years ago

Administration
- Archdiocese: Jaro
- Deanery: Saint Andrew

Saint Jerome Parish Church or the Dueñas Church is a Roman Catholic church located in the municipality of Dueñas, Iloilo in the Philippines. It is under the jurisdiction of the Archdiocese of Jaro. The present structure was constructed in the late nineteenth century and is notable for its Tuscan-inspired architecture, a style uncommon among the predominantly Baroque and Renaissance-influenced churches of the province.

== History ==
Construction of the present church began in 1878, as indicated by an inscription on its façade, and was completed in 1884. During the Second World War, the church sustained significant damage when it was burned. Further destruction occurred during the 1948 Lady Caycay earthquake, which damaged the dome and the western bell tower. Restoration and conservation works have been undertaken periodically since then to preserve the historic structure.

== Architecture ==
The main entrance consists of a semicircular arch framed by blind arched fenestrations and niches containing statues of Saints Peter and Paul. Above the entrance is a balcony with balustrades and corbels, while a niche containing an image of Saint Jerome occupies the central portion of the façade. An inscription bearing the year 1878 marks the commencement of the church's construction. The Augustinian seal appears above the side niches.

The octagonal bell towers are decorated with balustrades, lanterns, and cupolas. The side walls are pierced by arches and circular openings, while the interior features a nave leading to a bright sanctuary illuminated by a clerestory. Architectural elements such as arches, pilasters, and a central dome further reflect the church's Tuscan influence.

The eastern bell tower contains a chapel housing a statue of the Pietà, while the western bell tower serves as the church baptistery. Additional devotional spaces within the church are dedicated to the Sacred Heart of Jesus, Our Lady of Guadalupe, and the Black Madonna.
