= Benigno S. Aquino Jr. Avenue =

Highway in Iloilo, Philippines

Senator Benigno S. Aquino Jr. Avenue
- Iloilo Diversion Road
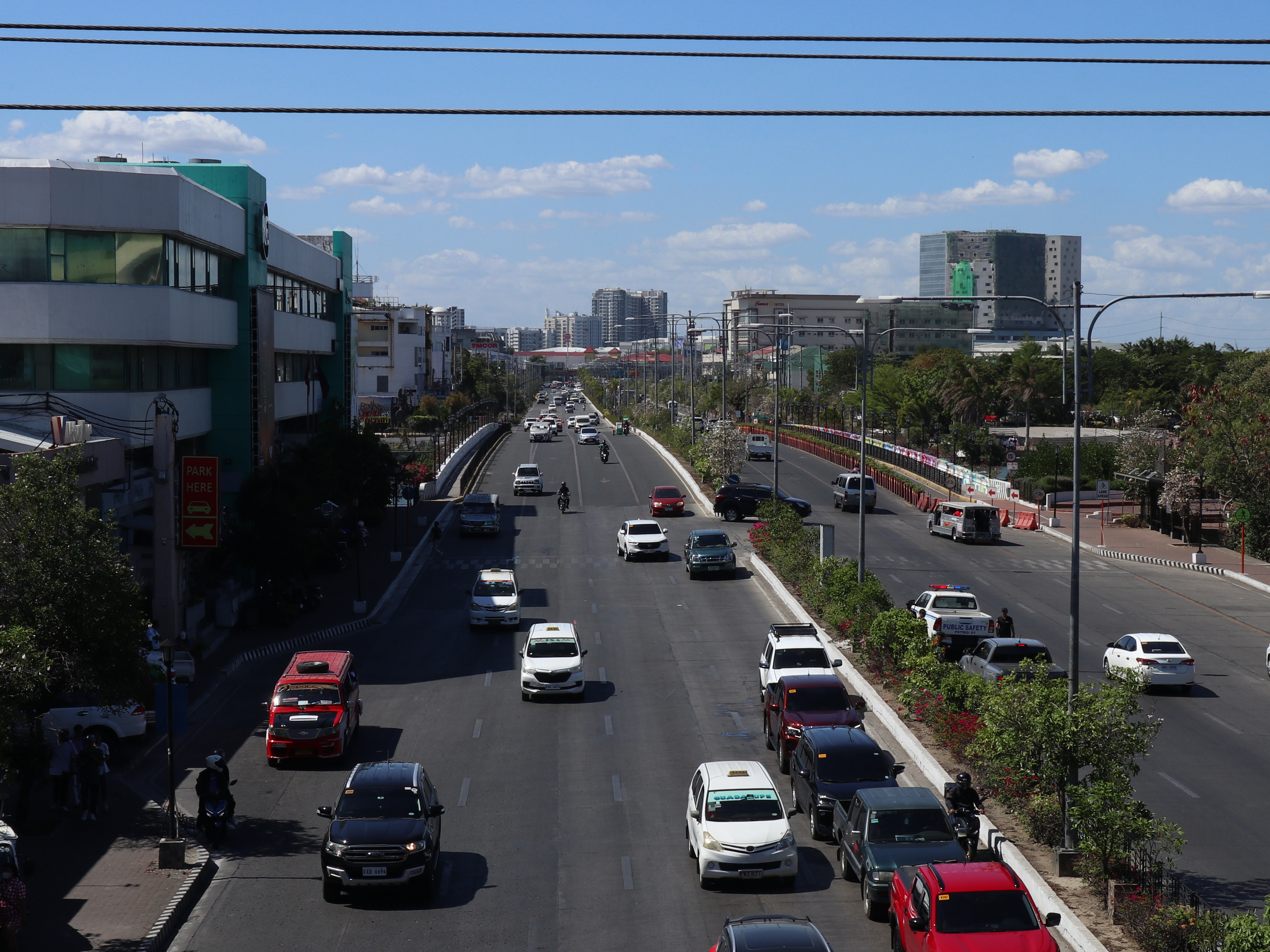
- Southern terminus of Benigno S. Aquino Jr. Avenue, looking north in Mandurriao

Route information
- Maintained by the Department of Public Works and Highways
- Length: 16.62 km (10.33 mi)
- Component highways: N513 in Santa Barbara; N512 from Santa Barbara to Iloilo City; N515 in Iloilo City; N5 in Iloilo City
- Restrictions: No tricycles, pedicabs

Major junctions
- North end: N513 (Santa Barbara Bypass Road) in Santa Barbara
- Airport Access Road in Santa Barbara; N512 (Roosevelt Street) in Santa Barbara; Felix Gorriceta Avenue in Pavia; N516 (President Corazon C. Aquino Avenue) in Pavia; N512 (Lopez Jaena Street) in Iloilo City; N5 (Mandurriao–Jaro Road) in Iloilo City; Donato Pison Avenue in Iloilo City
- South end: N501 (Iloilo–Antique Road) in Iloilo City

Location
- Country: Philippines
- Major cities: Iloilo City
- Towns: Santa Barbara, Pavia

Highway system
- Roads in the Philippines; Highways; Expressways; List

Senator Benigno S. Aquino Jr. Avenue, formerly known as Jaro West Diversion Road and still colloquially referred to as Diversion Road, is a major highway in the Iloilo metropolitan area on the island of Panay in the Philippines. It serves as the primary thoroughfare from Iloilo City to Iloilo International Airport and passes through the municipalities of Pavia and Santa Barbara.

The avenue constitutes the southern section of National Route 5 and the Old Iloilo–Capiz Road, connecting the province of Iloilo to the province of Capiz. It was named after Benigno "Ninoy" Simeon Aquino Jr., a former senator who played a significant role in opposing the regime of then-President Ferdinand Marcos.

== Route description ==
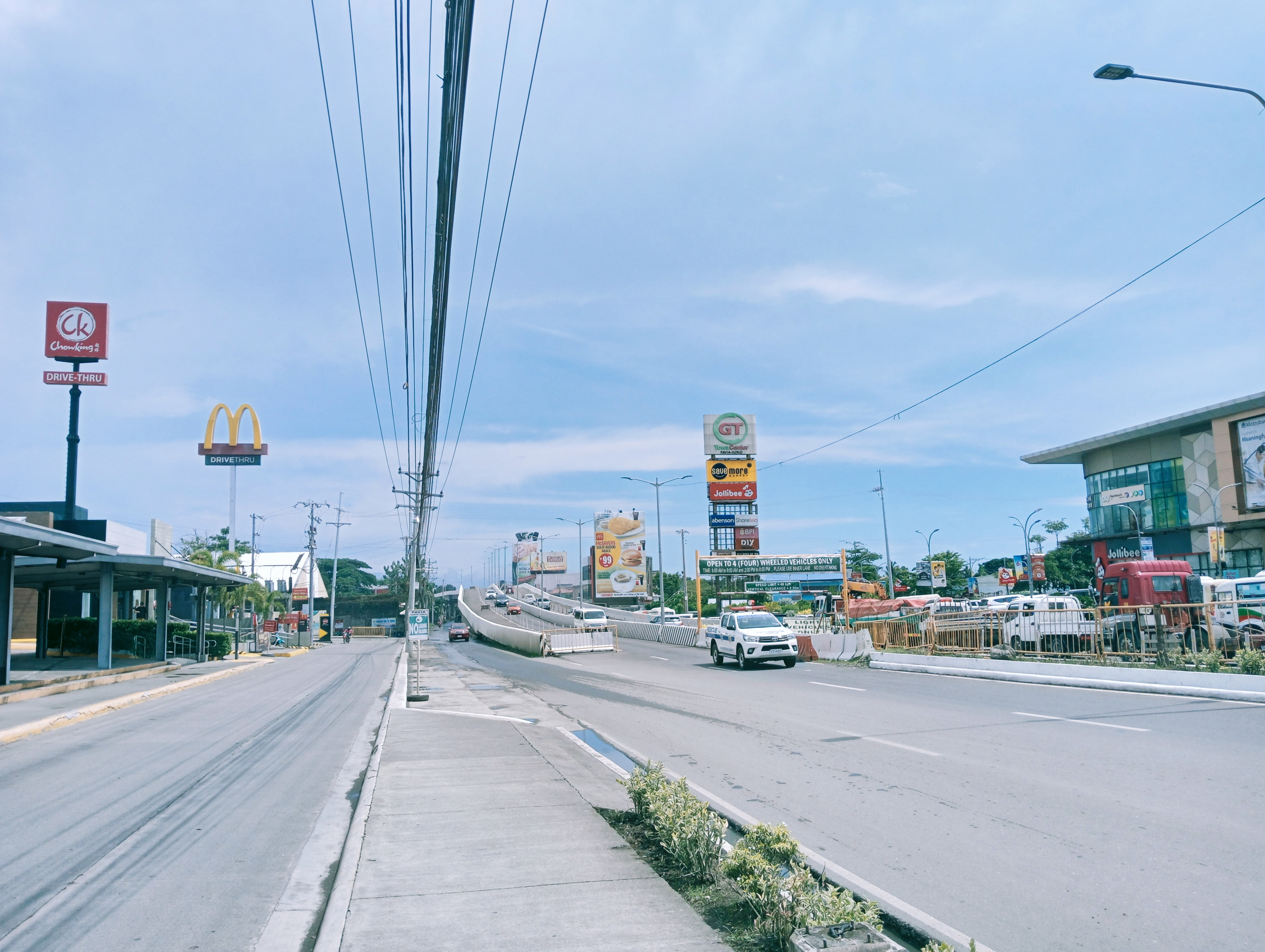
Northbound approach to the Ungka Flyover along a section of Benigno S. Aquino Jr. Avenue in Pavia

Senator Benigno S. Aquino Jr. Avenue begins at the junction of General Luna Street, Infante Avenue, and Marcelo H. del Pilar Street, located at the boundary of Iloilo City Proper and Molo. The avenue traverses the Iloilo City districts of Mandurriao and Jaro, as well as the municipalities of Pavia and Santa Barbara. It is a 16.62-kilometre (10.33 mi) highway featuring six to eight lanes, complemented by a two-lane service road and a protected bike lane. It includes two four-lane flyovers that cross over President Corazon C. Aquino Avenue and Felix Gorriceta Jr. Avenue in Pavia.

== History ==
Benigno S. Aquino Jr. Avenue was constructed in 1975 and was originally known as Jaro West Diversion Road. It was built as a bypass and an alternative route to downtown Iloilo City, as Lopez Jaena and E. Lopez Streets in the Jaro and La Paz districts were experiencing heavy traffic due to the presence of numerous institutions in the area. The initial stretch of Jaro West Diversion Road was a 5-kilometre (3.1 mi) route that began in Barangay Sambag in Jaro and ended in the then-swampy barangays of Bakhaw, Bolilao, and San Rafael in Mandurriao.

With the construction of the new Iloilo International Airport in Cabatuan in the mid-2000s, the road was extended and has since become the main thoroughfare from Iloilo City to the new airport. It has been widened to accommodate six to eight lanes, featuring two-lane service road in its section within Iloilo City, along with a protected, tree-lined elevated bike lane. The section in Mandurriao has evolved into a major business district in Iloilo City.

== Intersections ==
Intersections are numbered by kilometer post, with Arroyo Fountain in Iloilo City designated as kilometer 0.

Province	City/Municipality	km	mi	Destinations	Notes
Iloilo City				N501 (Iloilo–Antique Road)	Southern terminus
Iloilo City				Donato Pison Avenue	
Iloilo City				Jalandoni Street	
Iloilo City				N5 (Mandurriao–Jaro Road)	
Iloilo City				Airport Spur Road	
Iloilo City				N512 (Lopez Jaena Street)	
Iloilo	Pavia			N516 (President Corazon C. Aquino Avenue)	
Iloilo	Pavia			Felix Gorriceta Jr. Avenue / Gonzaga Street	
Iloilo	Pavia			Evangelista Street	
Iloilo	Santa Barbara			Santa Barbara Bypass Road (Iloilo Circumferential Road 2)	
Iloilo	Santa Barbara			N512 (Roosevelt Street) / San Miguel–Santa Barbara Road	
Iloilo	Santa Barbara			Airport Access Road	
Iloilo	Santa Barbara			N513 (Santa Barbara Bypass Road) (Iloilo Circumferential Road 3)	Northern terminus
1.000 mi = 1.609 km; 1.000 km = 0.621 mi
