= Iloilo Provincial Capitol =

Capitol building of Iloilo province in the Philippines

- Interactive map of the Iloilo Provincial Capitol area

General information
- Location: Iloilo City, Philippines
- Coordinates: 10°42′9.4″N 122°34′8.5″E
- Current tenants: Office of the Governor; Provincial Government of Iloilo
- Completed: 2006

Technical details
- Floor count: 6 floors

Design and construction
- Architect: Guillermo Hisancha

The Iloilo Provincial Capitol is the seat of the provincial government of Iloilo in the Philippines. It is located on Bonifacio Drive in Iloilo City Proper, adjacent to the Casa Real de Iloilo, the former seat of the provincial government since the Spanish colonial period.

== History ==
The new Iloilo Provincial Capitol was built in 2006 after a 1998 fire of unknown origin severely damaged the Casa Real de Iloilo, the old capitol, destroying nearly half of the structure and leaving only the main building intact. The old capitol building has since been renovated and restored to its original design and now serves as a lobby and reception area for visiting guests and government dignitaries.

The new capitol building, upon its completion, is considered one of the most modern and largest capitol buildings in the Philippines.

=== 2007 Capitol Siege ===
On January 17, 2007, heavily armed units of the Philippine National Police (PNP) forcibly entered the capitol building as part of efforts to enforce an administrative dismissal order against Governor Niel Tupas Sr. issued by the Office of the Ombudsman. Some 200 police personnel, including elements of the Regional Mobile Group in full battle gear, moved onto the capitol grounds to serve the dismissal and related orders, encountering resistance from supporters of the governor who had barricaded parts of the building and held vigils inside. Police were reported to have broken down gates and glass doors to gain access to the building, and there were accounts of officers pointing firearms during the operation. It sparked national criticism over the use of force and alleged violations of human rights.

== Architecture ==
Iloilo Provincial Capitol complex at night

The Iloilo Provincial Capitol was designed by Filipino architect Guillermo Hisancha. The capitol complex underwent redevelopment in 2019, including the building of a 6-storey with roof deck multilevel parking building; landscaping of the front of the Capitol building up to the Casa Real, or the Old Provincial Capitol; improvement of the grounds adjacent to the Western Visayas Regional Museum; and the improvement of the power station. The centerpiece of the redevelopment project is the mural titled "Panaysayun sang Paranublion." The two-meter by 15-meter mural, which depicts the rich culture and heritage of the province, was designed by architects Victor Jacinto, Ryan Angelo Braga, Kenneth Torre, and Jorge Cadiao Jr. It was sculpted by architects Margarette and Albert Pampliega.

== See also ==
- Casa Real de Iloilo
