= Arroyo Fountain =

Historic monument in Iloilo City, Philippines

Coordinates: 10°42′06″N 122°34′09″E

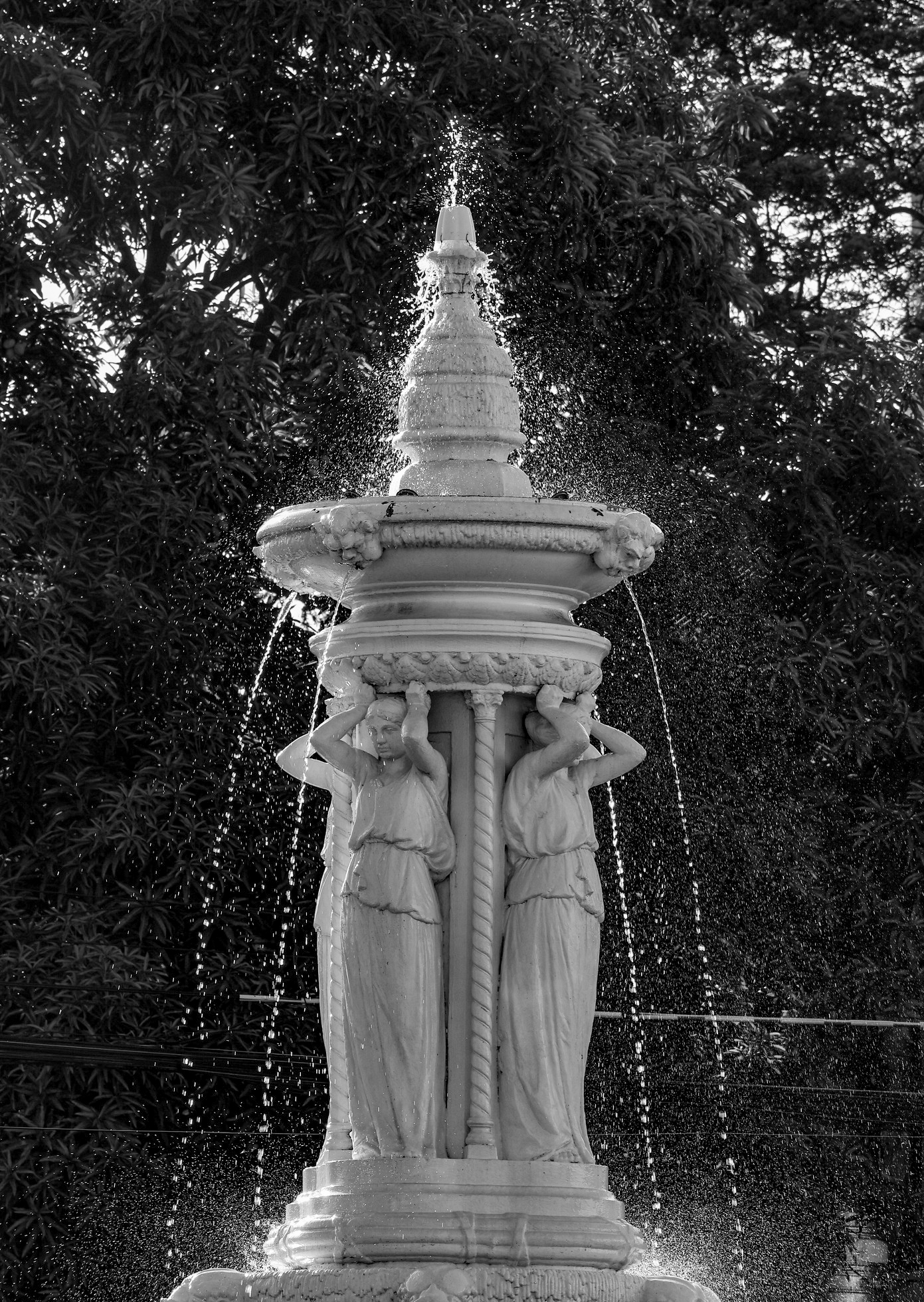
- Arroyo Fountain, with Casa Real de Iloilo in the background
- Interactive map of Arroyo Fountain
- Location: Iloilo City, Philippines
- Type: kilometre zero
- Completion date: 1927
- Dedicated to: José María Arroyo

Arroyo Fountain is a historic monument located in front of Casa Real de Iloilo in Iloilo City Proper, Philippines. The fountain serves as kilometre zero, the benchmark used to measure distances from Iloilo City to other points in Panay Island, the Western Visayas region, and other places in the Philippines.

Arroyo Fountain was named after Senator José María Arroyo, who authored Republic Act No. 3222, the law that established the Iloilo Metropolitan Waterworks in 1925. It was declared an Important Cultural Property (ICP), along with the Casa Real de Iloilo, by the National Museum of the Philippines (NMP) in December 2022.

== History ==
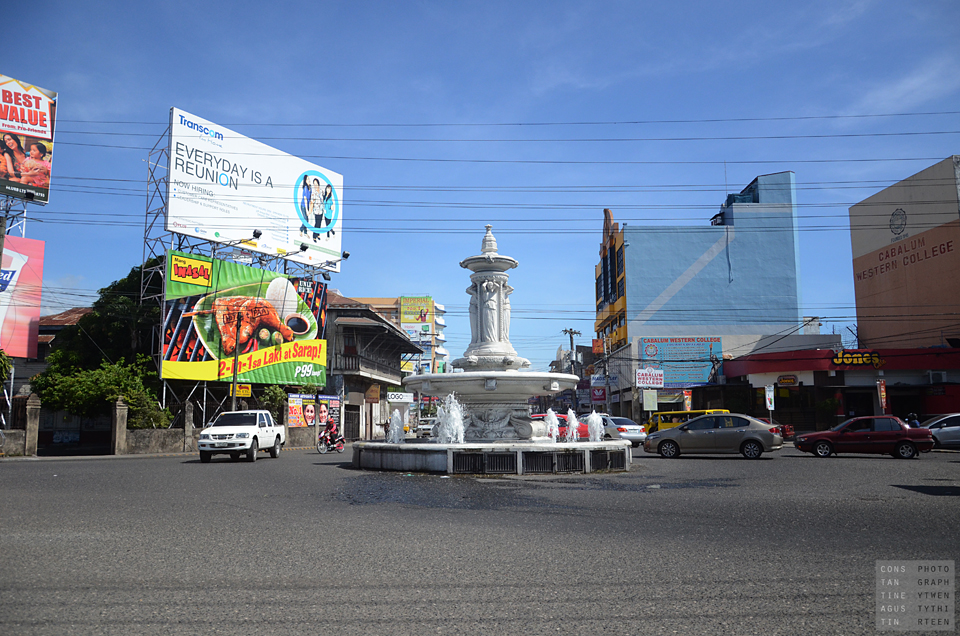
Arroyo Fountain in the middle of the downtown street.

Arroyo Fountain was built in 1927 after a law that established the Iloilo Metropolitan Waterworks in September 16, 1925. The site of the structure was where the original flagpole of the old Provincial Capitol used to stand.

The fountain is a sculpture composed of originally four naked Grecian icon muses holding overhead a large basin that is overflowing with water gushing from a spout at the top and flowing down to gather in a larger collective basin. However, in 1929, at the insistence of the Roman Catholic Church, the naked muses were later "clothed" in flowing garments and underwent re-sculpting to appear as what the statues look like today.

In modern times, the fountain still stands in the middle of the road, serving as a roundabout for vehicles coming to and from the different districts of the city. In December 2022, it was declared by the National Museum of the Philippines (NMP), together with the Casa Real de Iloilo, as an Important Cultural Property (ICP), as the fountain undergone rehabilitation.
