= Dueñas, Iloilo =

Municipality in Iloilo, Philippines

Dueñas Laglag Sibucao Sumandig
- Municipality
- Municipality of Dueñas
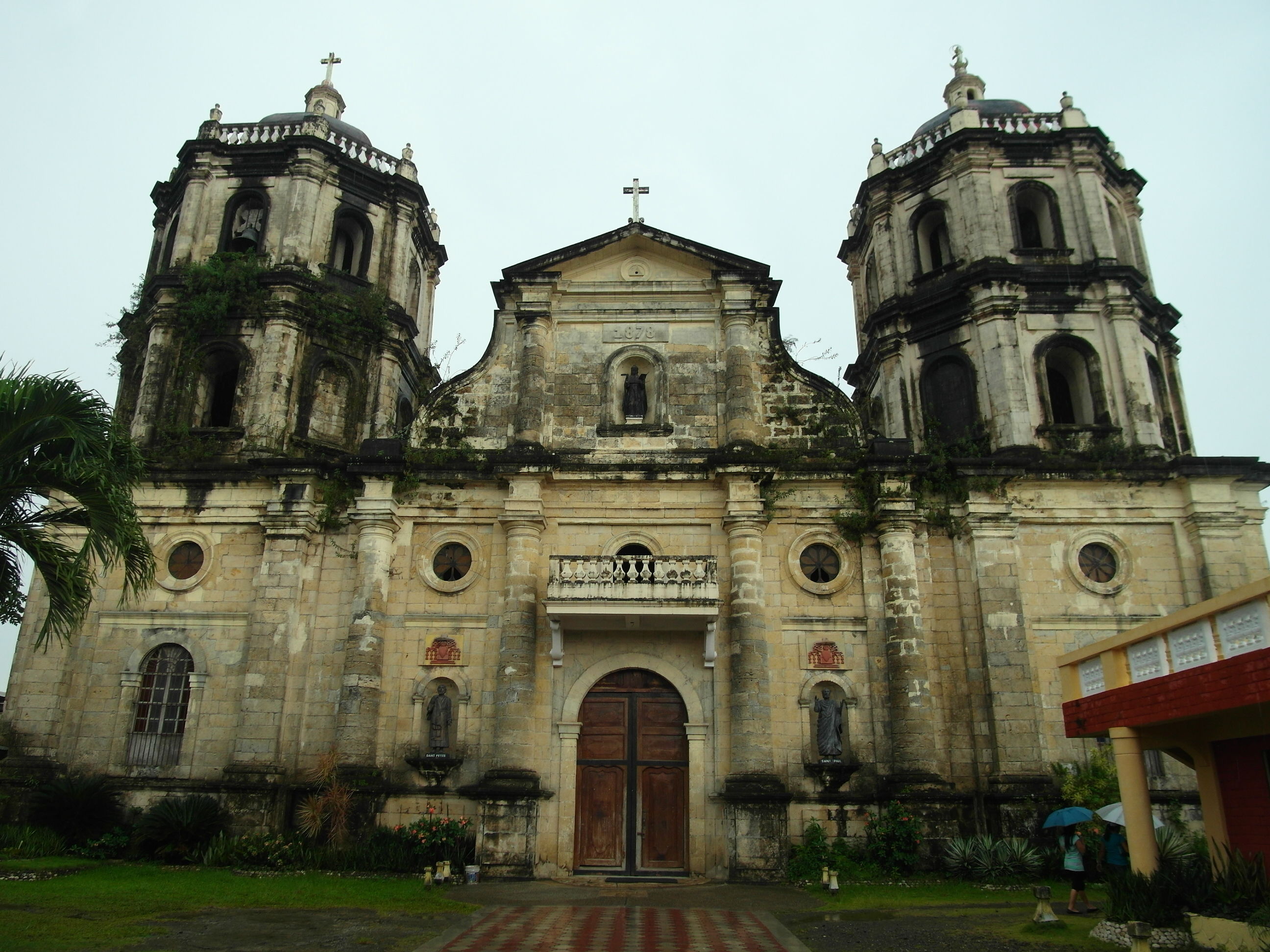
- Dueñas Church

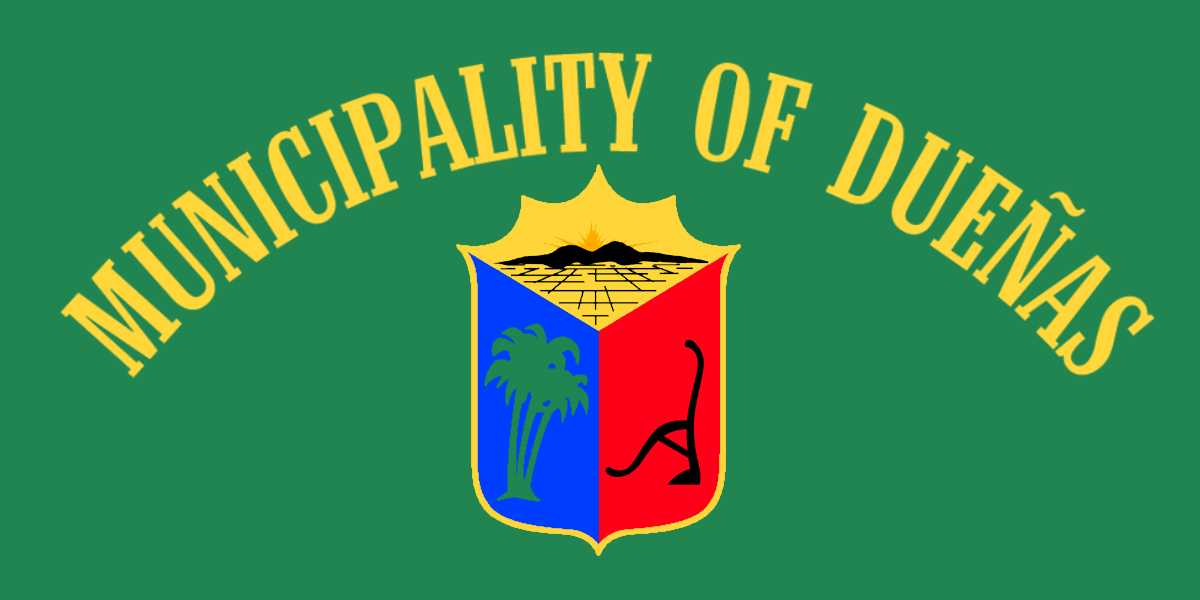
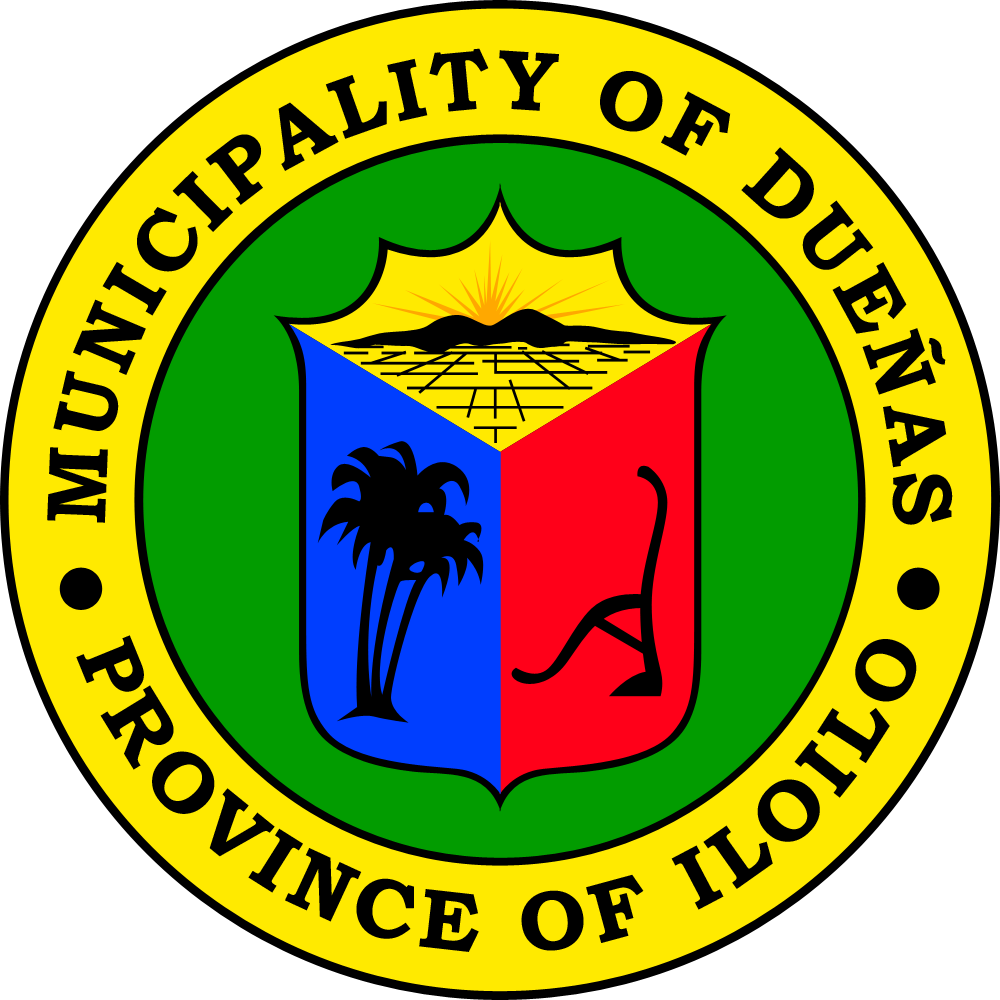
- Flag Seal

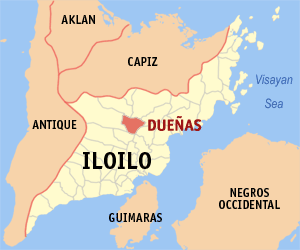
- Map of Iloilo with Dueñas highlighted
- Interactive map of Dueñas
- Location within the Philippines
- Coordinates: 11°04′N 122°37′E
- Country: Philippines
- Region: Western Visayas
- Province: Iloilo
- District: 4th district
- Barangays: 47 (see Barangays)

Government
  - Type: Sangguniang Bayan
  - Mayor: Robert Martin U. Pama (Nacionalista)
  - Vice Mayor: Pia June I. Pama (Nacionalista)
  - Representative: Ferjenel G. Biron (Nacionalista)
  - Municipal Council: Members: Reymar F. Lamasan (Nacionalista); Ronald S. Paclibar(Nacionalista); Ireneo D. Lumayno(Nacionalista); Francis L. La-ab(Nacionalista); Marigie P. Palmares (Nacionalista); Rey Stephen M. Catalan(Nacionalista); Edwin A. Sorongon(Nacionalista); Yzabelle Annika L. Padojinog(Nacionalista); Philip Anthony L. Piccio ^{‡}; John Prime D. Pelopero ^{◌}; ‡ ex officio ABC president; ◌ ex officio SK chairman
  - Electorate: 22,785 voters (2025)

Area
  - Total: 90.52 km^{2} (34.95 sq mi)
- Elevation: 55 m (180 ft)
- Highest elevation: 264 m (866 ft)
- Lowest elevation: 26 m (85 ft)

Population (2024 census)
  - Total: 34,941
  - Density: 386.0/km^{2} (999.7/sq mi)
  - Households: 8,835
- Demonym: Dueñasanon

Economy
  - Income class: 3rd municipal income class
  - Poverty incidence: 17.97% (2023)
  - Revenue: ₱ 170 million (2024)
  - Assets: ₱ 521.6 million (2024)
  - Expenditure: ₱ 118.6 million (2024)

Service provider
  - Electricity: Iloilo 2 Electric Cooperative (ILECO 2)
- Time zone: UTC+8 (PST)
- ZIP code: 5038
- PSGC: 063017000
- IDD : area code: +63 (0)33
- Native languages: Karay-a

Dueñas, officially the Municipality of Dueñas (Kinaray-a: Banwa ka Dueñas; Hiligaynon: Banwa sang Dueñas, Tagalog: Bayan ng Dueñas), is a 3rd class municipality in the province of Iloilo, Philippines. According to the 2024 census, it has a population of 34,941 people.

== History ==
Dueñas was founded in 1590 under the name Sumandig. In 1599, it was moved to Sibucao. In 1603 the town was joined to Dumangas but regained independence in 1605.

In 1608, the town was transferred to Laglag, now Barangay Pader, Dueñas, and remained there until 1667. It had only five barrios, namely: Sibucao and Sumandig in the lowlands; and Misi, Camantugan and Malonor in the upland.

In 1641, the neighboring pueblo of Baong to the east became so small after it has been depopulated twice that it was annexed as a visita to Laglag and remained as such for 182 years.

In 1668, Laglag was joined to Passi, only to be separated a year after (1669). From 1669 to 1844 or for a period of 175 years, Laglag still remained in the said site. (This was for reason that most of the family name of the residents of Dueñas begin with letter "L" ).

On March 8, 1820, with the support of 31 cabezas de barangay of the principalía of the visita of Dingle (formerly Baong), and the parish priest of Laglag, Fray Juan Raile, a petition for the re-elevation of Dingle into a pueblo was submitted to Miguel Calderón, alcalde mayor (equivalent to the present-day provincial governor) of Iloilo, through the leadership of the Dingleño teniente mayor (municipal vice-mayor) of Laglag, Don Juan Marcelino Dayot (Dingle gobernadorcillo, 1829–1835). On April 28, 1823, Dingle was thus re-elevated into a pueblo and separated itself from Laglag after almost two centuries of being under one pueblo.

In 1845, Laglag was moved around four kilometers eastward and was given the name Dueñas in memory of the birthplace (Dueñas, Palencia, Spain) of Fr. Florencio Martin, who authored the transfer. Saint Jerome, Doctor of the Church, is the patron saint of the town.

The word "Dueñas" or "Dueña" is derived from a Latin word domna or domina, which means landlady or madam who has dominion over a certain house or estate.

=== Urban legend ===
Dueñas has been known to be the site of the infamous "Teniente Gimo" urban legend story. Teniente is a Spanish word for lieutenant since according to the story, a man named Gimo was the Teniente del Barrio, or what is now known as the Barangay Chairman of the place. The story revolves about Gimo's family of aswangs wherein one of her daughters invited two of her female classmates from Iloilo City to their barrio fiesta without any knowledge of them being aswangs. The story says that Gimo and company mistakenly slaughtered his daughter while asleep instead of the targeted guest after that one guest herself overheard them of their plan to slaughter her and feast for her body. As a result, the girl tricked the aswangs into killing their own kind and escaped, while the fate of the other classmate was unknown.

The story has still been considered unproven and remains arguably the most famous aswang story of all time. Sources state that the whole story and characters were all fictional and is a product of old native literature by the elderly Ilonggo people. The story is often told by adults, both young and old, to scare off disobedient children. It has even been referenced to in popular culture specifically in a few Philippine horror films and is also widespread outside Iloilo and the rest of Panay, with various versions of the tale.

== Geography ==
Dueñas is 44 kilometres (27 mi) from Iloilo City.

=== Barangays ===
Dueñas is politically subdivided into 47 barangays. Each barangay consists of puroks and some have sitios.

- Agutayan
- Angare
- Anjawan
- Baac
- Bagongbong
- Balangigan
- Balingasag
- Banugan
- Batuan
- Bita
- Buenavista
- Bugtongan
- Cabudian
- Calaca-an
- Calang
- Calawinan
- Capaycapay
- Capuling
- Catig
- Dila-an
- Fundacion
- Inadlawan
- Jagdong
- Jaguimit
- Lacadon
- Luag
- Malusgod
- Maribuyong
- Minanga
- Monpon
- Navalas
- Pader
- Pandan
- Poblacion A
- Poblacion B
- Poblacion C
- Poblacion D
- Ponong Grande
- Ponong Pequeño
- Purog
- Romblon
- San Isidro
- Santo Niño
- Sawe
- Taminla
- Tinocuan
- Tipolo

=== Climate ===
Climate data for Dueñas, Iloilo
| Month | Jan | Feb | Mar | Apr | May | Jun | Jul | Aug | Sep | Oct | Nov | Dec | Year |
|---|---|---|---|---|---|---|---|---|---|---|---|---|---|
| Mean daily maximum °C (°F) | 28 (82) | 28 (82) | 30 (86) | 32 (90) | 32 (90) | 30 (86) | 29 (84) | 29 (84) | 29 (84) | 29 (84) | 29 (84) | 28 (82) | 29 (85) |
| Mean daily minimum °C (°F) | 22 (72) | 22 (72) | 23 (73) | 23 (73) | 24 (75) | 25 (77) | 24 (75) | 24 (75) | 24 (75) | 24 (75) | 23 (73) | 23 (73) | 23 (74) |
| Average precipitation mm (inches) | 57 (2.2) | 37 (1.5) | 41 (1.6) | 42 (1.7) | 98 (3.9) | 155 (6.1) | 187 (7.4) | 162 (6.4) | 179 (7.0) | 188 (7.4) | 114 (4.5) | 78 (3.1) | 1,338 (52.8) |
| Average rainy days | 12.0 | 7.7 | 9.2 | 10.2 | 19.5 | 24.6 | 26.9 | 25.1 | 25.5 | 25.2 | 18.0 | 13.0 | 216.9 |
Source: Meteoblue

== Demographics ==
Population census of Dueñas
| Year | Pop. | ±% p.a. |
|---|---|---|
| 1903 | 6,700 | — |
| 1918 | 10,177 | +2.83% |
| 1939 | 16,310 | +2.27% |
| 1948 | 17,842 | +1.00% |
| 1960 | 19,004 | +0.53% |
| 1970 | 19,866 | +0.44% |
| 1975 | 23,028 | +3.01% |
| 1980 | 23,962 | +0.80% |
| 1990 | 28,472 | +1.74% |
| 1995 | 28,954 | +0.32% |
| 2000 | 30,882 | +1.39% |
| 2007 | 32,149 | +0.56% |
| 2010 | 33,671 | +1.70% |
| 2015 | 34,242 | +0.32% |
| 2020 | 34,597 | +0.22% |
| 2024 | 34,941 | +0.24% |
Source: Philippine Statistics Authority

In the 2024 census, the population of Dueñas was 34,941 people, with a density of 390 inhabitants per square kilometre or 1,000 inhabitants per square mile.

== Economy ==
Poverty incidence of Dueñas (%)

Source: Philippine Statistics Authority

== Government ==
As of 2018, there have been around 75 town executives who served Dueñas (from old name - Laglag to present name - Dueñas).

=== Elected officials ===
- Mayor: Robert Martin U. Pama
- Vice Mayor: Pia June Pama
- Congressman: Ferjenel G. Biron
- Councilors:
  - Paclibar, Ronald, S.
  - Lamasan Reymar, F.
  - Lumayno, Ireneo, D.
  - Palmares, Marigie, P.
  - La-ab, Francis, L.
  - Lara, Jessie James Manuel, B..
  - Muyco, Roy, S..
  - Panerio, Medardo, L.

== Education ==
The Dueñas Schools District Office governs all educational institutions within the municipality. It oversees the management and operations of all private and public, from primary to secondary schools.

=== Primary and elementary school ===
- Agmonti Elementary School
- Aurora Araneta Memorial Elementary School
- Bagongbong Elementary School
- Balangigan Elementary School
- Banugan Elementary School
- Buenavista Elementary School
- Bugtongan Elementary School
- Cabudian Elementary School
- Calang Elementary School
- Catig-Lacadon Elementary School
- Dila-an Elementary School
- Doane Learning Center
- Dueñas Baptist Church Learning Center
- Dueñas Central Elementary School
- Fundacion Primary School
- Jaguimit Elementary School
- Malusgod Elementary School
- Maribuyong Elementary School
- Martin Laguartilla Primary School
- Navalas Elementary School
- Ponong Grande Elementary School
- Ponong Pequeno Elementary School
- Purog Elementary School
- Romblon Elementary School
- San Isidro Primary School
- St. Jerome Academy

=== Secondary schools ===
- Batuan Integrated School
- Cabudian National High School
- Duenas General Comprehensive High School
- Malusgod National High School
- Maribuyong National High School
- Sto. Niño Integrated School
- Taminla Integrated School

== Notable personalities ==
- Haydée Coloso-Espino (1937–2021) – swimmer
- Adriano Hernández (1870–1925) – a revolutionary, patriot, military strategist
- Vicente Piccio Jr. (1927–2015) – former major general of Philippine Air Force
