= Dumalag =

Municipality in Capiz, Philippines

- Municipality
- Municipality of Dumalag
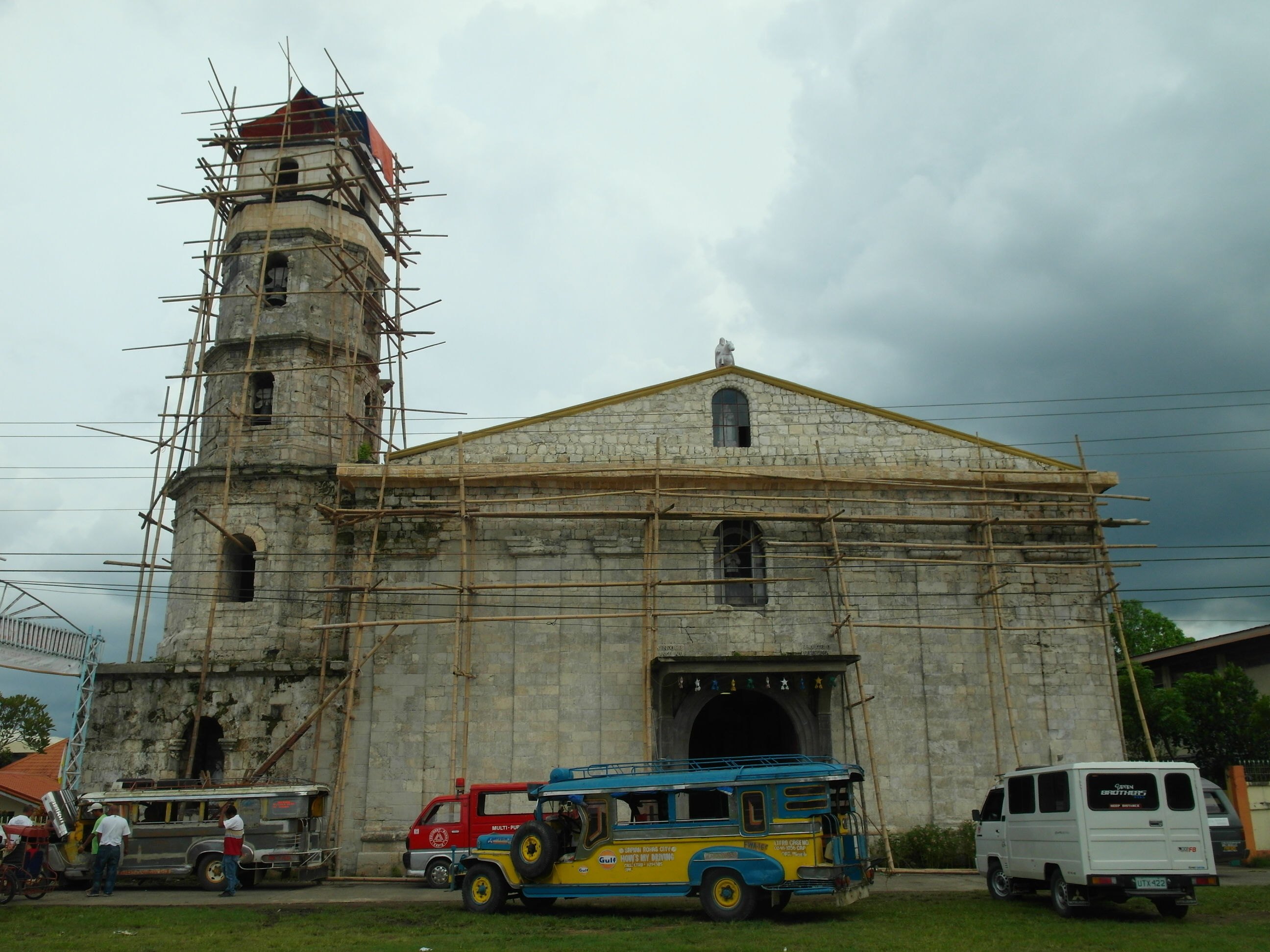
- Church of Dumalag (St. Martin of Tours Parish Church)

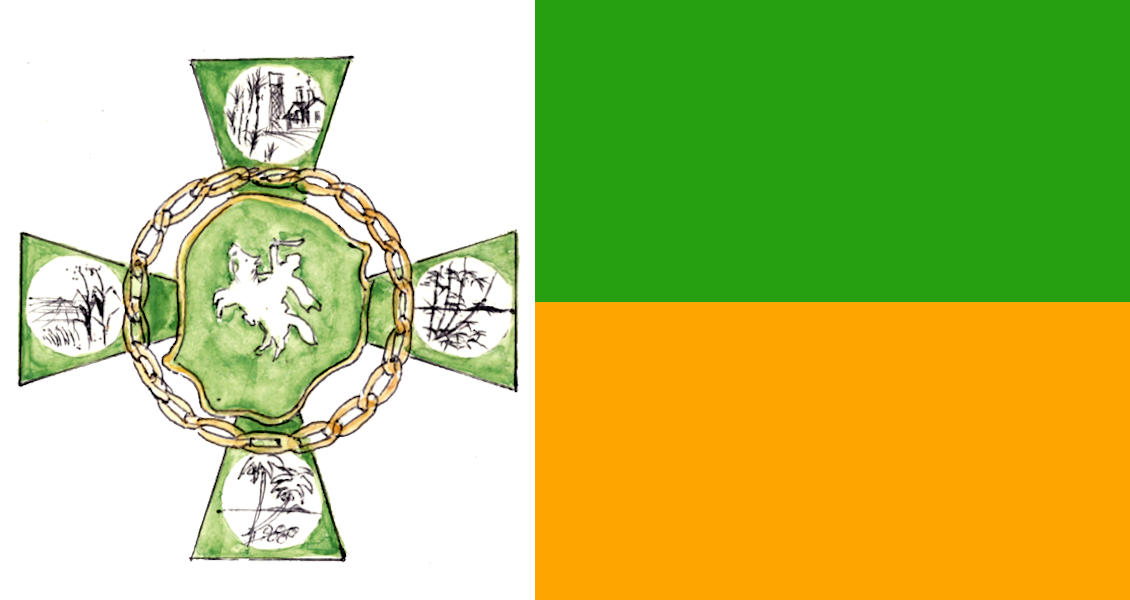
- Flag

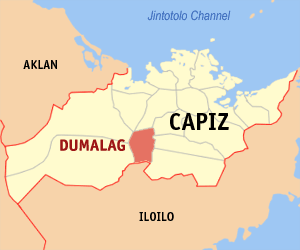
- Map of Capiz with Dumalag highlighted
- Interactive map of Dumalag
- Location within the Philippines
- Coordinates: 11°18′14″N 122°37′17″E
- Country: Philippines
- Region: Western Visayas
- Province: Capiz
- District: 2nd district
- Barangays: 19 (see Barangays)

Government
  - Type: Sangguniang Bayan
  - Mayor: Maria Concepcion T. Castro (1Capiz)
  - Vice Mayor: Fredenil T. Castro, II (1Capiz)
  - Representative: Jane T. Castro (Lakas)
  - Municipal Council: Members: Rainjo D. Castro; Victorio L. Faduga; Fernado Ramon D. Salcedo; Mercidita F. Diaz; Motre F. Bellosillo; Richard F. Biaco; Ryan Anthony P. Fajardo; Josaril M. Villabeto
  - Electorate: 21,263 voters (2025)

Area
  - Total: 109.18 km^{2} (42.15 sq mi)
- Elevation: 68 m (223 ft)
- Highest elevation: 453 m (1,486 ft)
- Lowest elevation: 11 m (36 ft)

Population (2024 census)
  - Total: 30,872
  - Density: 282.76/km^{2} (732.35/sq mi)

Economy
  - Income class: 3rd municipal income class
  - Poverty incidence: 15.95% (2023)
  - Revenue: ₱ 158.7 million (2024)
  - Assets: ₱ 335.2 million (2024)
  - Expenditure: ₱ 720.1 million (2024)
  - Liabilities: ₱ 69.71 million (2024)

Service provider
  - Electricity: Capiz Electric Cooperative (CAPELCO)
- Time zone: UTC+8 (PST)
- ZIP code: 5813
- PSGC: 061903000
- IDD : area code: +63 (0)36
- Native languages: Karay-a; Capisnon; Hiligaynon; Tagalog
- Website: www.dumalag.gov.ph

Dumalag, officially the Municipality of Dumalag (Capiznon/Hiligaynon: Banwa sang Dumalag; Tagalog: Bayan ng Dumalag), is a municipality in the province of Capiz, Philippines. According to the 2024 census, it has a population of 30,872 people.

It is known for the Suhot spring and caves, a natural attraction near the Paningraon range.

== Etymology ==
Its early name, Ayombong, changed to Dumalag in 1631. The name has several possible origins, including the word dalag for yellow, the river’s color, the term dumalaga for young chicken, or a response to Spanish visitors describing the river as gadalag. A family name may also be linked to it.

== History ==
Dumalag was founded by the Augustinians in 1590 and returned to their care in 1614 after a brief shift to the bishopric. The town’s first church and convent were built between 1600 and 1720, and the present church began in 1833. Much of it was damaged in the 1948 earthquake and later rebuilt.

== Geography ==
Dumalag is 44 kilometres (27 mi) from Roxas City.

=== Barangays ===
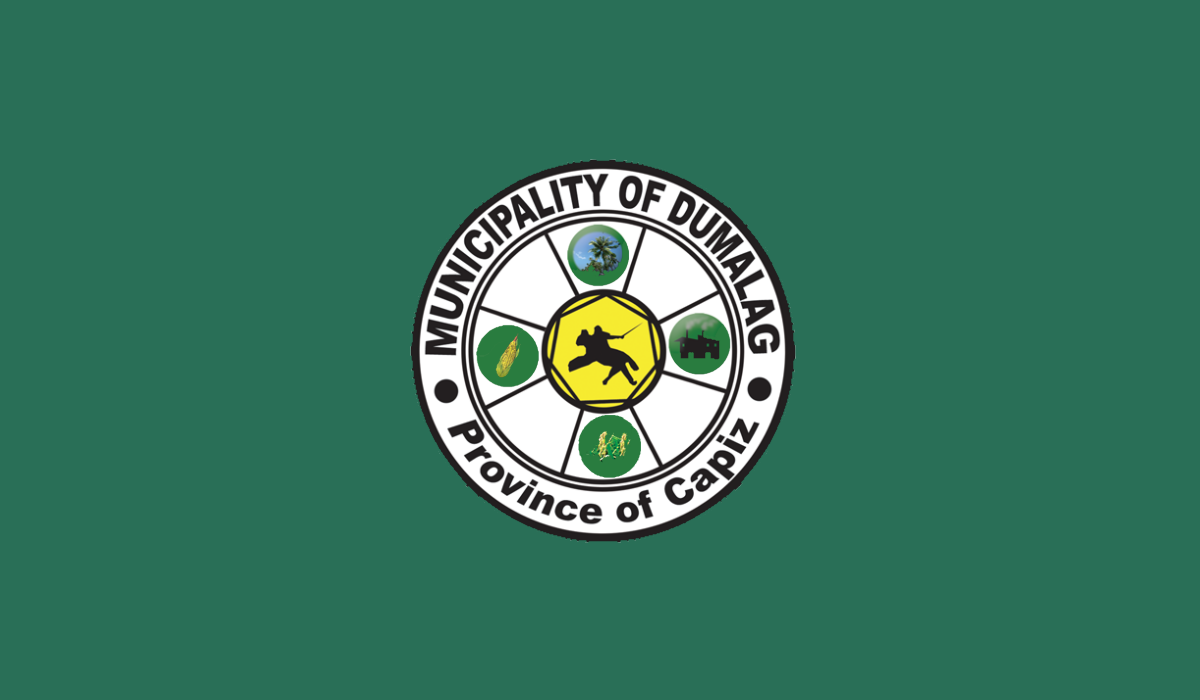
Government flag of Dumalag

Dumalag is politically subdivided into 19 barangays. Each barangay consists of puroks and some have sitios. Most of barangays named after saints.

- Concepcion
- Consolacion
- Dolores
- Duran
- Poblacion
- San Agustin
- San Jose
- San Martin
- San Miguel
- San Rafael
- San Roque
- Santa Carmen
- Santa Cruz
- Santa Monica
- Santa Rita
- Santa Teresa
- Santo Angel
- Santo Niño
- Santo Rosario

=== Climate ===
Climate data for Dumalag, Capiz
Month	Jan	Feb	Mar	Apr	May	Jun	Jul	Aug	Sep	Oct	Nov	Dec	Year
Mean daily maximum °C (°F)	27 (81)	28 (82)	29 (84)	31 (88)	32 (90)	31 (88)	30 (86)	30 (86)	29 (84)	29 (84)	29 (84)	27 (81)	29 (85)
Mean daily minimum °C (°F)	23 (73)	23 (73)	23 (73)	24 (75)	25 (77)	25 (77)	24 (75)	24 (75)	24 (75)	24 (75)	24 (75)	23 (73)	24 (75)
Average precipitation mm (inches)	61 (2.4)	39 (1.5)	46 (1.8)	48 (1.9)	90 (3.5)	144 (5.7)	152 (6.0)	145 (5.7)	163 (6.4)	160 (6.3)	120 (4.7)	90 (3.5)	1,258 (49.4)
Average rainy days	12.3	9.0	9.9	10.0	18.5	25.0	27.4	26.0	25.9	24.9	17.9	14.2	221
Source: Meteoblue

== Demographics ==
Population census of Dumalag
Year	Pop.	±% p.a.
1903	5,779	—
1918	9,050	+3.04%
1939	13,642	+1.97%
1948	13,103	−0.45%
1960	14,934	+1.10%
1970	18,348	+2.08%
1975	20,038	+1.78%
1980	22,198	+2.07%
1990	25,484	+1.39%
1995	28,348	+2.02%
2000	25,920	−1.90%
2007	29,221	+1.67%
2010	29,298	+0.10%
2015	29,466	+0.11%
2020	30,098	+0.45%
2024	30,872	+0.61%
Source: Philippine Statistics Authority

In the 2024 census, the population of Dumalag was 30,872 people, with a density of 280 inhabitants per square kilometre or 730 inhabitants per square mile.

== Economy ==
Poverty incidence of Dumalag (%)

Source: Philippine Statistics Authority

== Education ==
The Dumalag Schools District Office governs all educational institutions within the municipality. It oversees the management and operations of all private and public, from primary to secondary schools.

Primary and elementary schools

- Agbay-ang Elementary School
- Buntog Elementary School
- Concepcion Elementary School
- Concepcion H. Castro Elementary School
- Consolacion Elementary School
- Dolores Elementary School
- Dumalag Central School
- Duran Elementary School
- Maludlod Elementary School
- San Agustin Elementary School
- San Jose Elementary School
- San Martin Elementary School
- San Miguel Elementary School
- Sta. Cruz Elementary School
- Sta. Monica Elementary School
- Sta. Rita Elementary School
- Sta. Teresa Elementary School
- Sto. Niño Elementary School
- Sto. Rosario Elementary School

Secondary schools

- Concepcion Castro Garcia National High School
- Dr. Laureano R. Frial Integrated School
- Dumalag Central National High School

Trade School

- Dumalag Vocational Technical School - TESDA

Private Schools

- Saint Martin Academy
- Dumalag Christian School

== Notable personalities ==
- Jose Advincula (b. 1952), Cardinal, Archbishop of Manila
- Fredenil Castro (b. 1951), Politician
- Pierre Patricio (b. 1960), Virtual artist

== Sister cities ==
- Pasig (since March 27, 2023)
