= Congressional canvass for the 1965 Philippine presidential election =

The following is the official canvassing of votes by the Congress of the Philippines for the 1965 Philippine presidential election.

== Presidential election ==
| Candidate | Party | Votes | % |
|---|---|---|---|
| Ferdinand Marcos | Nacionalista Party | 3,861,324 | 51.94 |
| Diosdado Macapagal | Liberal Party | 3,187,752 | 42.88 |
| Raul Manglapus | Party for Philippine Progress | 384,564 | 5.17 |
| Gaudencio Bueno | New Leaf Party | 199 | 0.00 |
| Aniceto A. Hidalgo | New Leaf Party | 156 | 0.00 |
| Segundo Baldovi | Partido ng Bansa | 139 | 0.00 |
| Nic V. Garces | People’s Progressive Democratic Party | 130 | 0.00 |
| German F. Villanueva | Independent | 106 | 0.00 |
| Guillermo M. Mercado | Laborer Party | 27 | 0.00 |
| Antonio Nicolas Jr. | Allied Party | 27 | 0.00 |
| Blandino P. Ruan | Independent | 6 | 0.00 |
| Praxedes Floro | Independent | 1 | 0.00 |
| Total | | 7,434,431 | 100.00 |
| Valid votes | | 7,434,431 | 97.69 |
| Invalid/blank votes | | 175,620 | 2.31 |
| Total votes | | 7,610,051 | 100.00 |
| Registered voters/turnout | | 9,962,345 | 76.39 |
Source: Nohlen, Grotz, Hartmann, Hasall and Santos

| Province/City | Marcos | Macapagal | Manglapus | Bueno | Hidalgo | Baldove | Garces | Villanueva | Mercado | Nicolas | Ruan | Floro |
|---|---|---|---|---|---|---|---|---|---|---|---|---|
| Abra | 21,129 | 14,418 | 431 | 0 | 0 | 1 | 0 | 0 | 0 | 1 | 0 | |
| Agusan | 29,968 | 35,537 | 1,025 | 2 | 1 | 0 | 0 | 0 | 0 | 0 | 0 | |
| Aklan | 33,438 | 31,974 | 1,012 | 0 | 0 | 0 | 0 | 0 | 0 | 0 | 0 | |
| Angeles City | 4,041 | 11,760 | 322 | 0 | 0 | 0 | 0 | 0 | 0 | 0 | 0 | |
| Albay | 61,965 | 47,930 | 6,620 | 0 | 0 | 0 | 0 | 0 | 0 | 0 | 0 | |
| Antique | 29,690 | 22,793 | 4,930 | 0 | 0 | 1 | 1 | 0 | 2 | 0 | 0 | |
| Bacolod City | 17,904 | 15,587 | 5,483 | 0 | 0 | 0 | 6 | 0 | 1 | 0 | 0 | |
| Baguio | 10,902 | 4,928 | 1,782 | 0 | 0 | 0 | 0 | 0 | 0 | 0 | 0 | |
| Basilan City | 7,226 | 4,930 | 1,037 | 0 | 0 | 0 | 0 | 0 | 0 | 0 | 0 | |
| Bataan | 30,260 | 24,006 | 2,455 | 0 | 8 | 1 | 0 | 0 | 0 | 0 | 0 | |
| Batanes | 1,367 | 2,575 | 16 | 0 | 0 | 0 | 0 | 0 | 0 | 0 | 0 | |
| Batangas | 125,467 | 67,236 | 11,463 | 0 | 4 | 2 | 18 | 1 | 1 | 0 | 0 | |
| Bohol | 108,065 | 56,016 | 2,129 | 0 | 0 | 0 | 0 | 0 | 0 | 0 | 0 | |
| Bukidnon | 19,770 | 21,827 | 5,743 | 0 | 1 | 1 | 0 | 0 | 0 | 0 | 0 | |
| Bulacan | 122,142 | 88,426 | 10,388 | 10 | 4 | 10 | 0 | 0 | 9 | 2 | 0 | |
| Butuan | 18,297 | 18,861 | 1,098 | 1 | 1 | 0 | 2 | 0 | 0 | 0 | 0 | |
| Cabanatuan | 13,494 | 7,762 | 905 | 0 | 0 | 10 | 0 | 0 | 0 | 0 | 0 | |
| Cagayan | 86,718 | 22,373 | 3,939 | 0 | 1 | 0 | 1 | 1 | 0 | 0 | 0 | |
| Cagayan de Oro | 4,764 | 9,696 | 5,452 | 0 | 0 | 0 | 0 | 0 | 0 | 0 | 0 | |
| Calbayog | 9,102 | 8,303 | 91 | 0 | 0 | 0 | 0 | 0 | 0 | 0 | 0 | |
| Caloocan | 24,610 | 15,590 | 3,895 | 0 | 0 | 0 | 0 | 1 | 0 | 2 | 0 | |
| Camarines Norte | 24,122 | 24,069 | 4,368 | 0 | 0 | 1 | 0 | 1 | 0 | 0 | 0 | |
| Camarines Sur | 86,753 | 66,581 | 6,544 | 0 | 0 | 0 | 0 | 0 | 0 | 0 | 0 | |
| Canlaon | 1,362 | 1,049 | 22 | 0 | 0 | 0 | 0 | 0 | 0 | 0 | 0 | |
| Capiz | 35,829 | 34,304 | 1,602 | 1 | 0 | 0 | 7 | 0 | 1 | 1 | 0 | |
| Catanduanes | 12,403 | 24,967 | 862 | 0 | 0 | 0 | 0 | 0 | 0 | 0 | 0 | |
| Cavite | 40,693 | 65,686 | 2,748 | 0 | 13 | 0 | 1 | 0 | 0 | 0 | 0 | |
| Cavite City | 7,687 | 5,494 | 1,982 | 0 | 0 | 0 | 0 | 0 | 0 | 0 | 0 | |
| Cebu | 103,641 | 138,288 | 7,848 | 1 | 4 | 7 | 1 | 0 | 4 | 1 | 0 | |
| Cebu City | 28,452 | 34,565 | 6,815 | 0 | 1 | 0 | 0 | 0 | 0 | 0 | 0 | |
| Cotabato | 81,119 | 142,099 | 8,628 | 102 | 1 | 22 | 1 | 1 | 1 | 0 | 0 | |
| Cotabato City | 3,948 | 3,951 | 848 | 0 | 0 | 0 | 0 | 0 | 0 | 0 | 0 | |
| Dagupan | 11,990 | 9,213 | 698 | 0 | 0 | 0 | 0 | 0 | 0 | 0 | 0 | |
| Danao | 11,252 | 1,329 | 99 | 0 | 0 | 0 | 0 | 0 | 0 | 0 | 0 | |
| Dapitan | 4,679 | 3,843 | 433 | 0 | 0 | 0 | 0 | 0 | 0 | 0 | 0 | |
| Davao City | 34,337 | 29,339 | 4,485 | 0 | 1 | 1 | 1 | 0 | 0 | 0 | 0 | |
| Davao | 74,143 | 59,067 | 3,999 | 0 | 0 | 0 | 0 | 0 | 0 | 0 | 0 | |
| Dumaguete | 6,042 | 4,484 | 1,100 | 0 | 0 | 0 | 0 | 0 | 1 | 0 | 0 | |
| Gingoog | 3,047 | 4,511 | 2,128 | 0 | 0 | 0 | 0 | 0 | 0 | 0 | 0 | |
| Iligan City | 8,054 | 7,516 | 1,130 | 0 | 2 | 0 | 0 | 0 | 0 | 0 | 0 | |
| Ilocos Norte | 88,837 | 2,988 | 263 | 0 | 0 | 8 | 1 | 0 | 0 | 0 | 0 | |
| Ilocos Sur | 99,147 | 10,179 | 1,451 | 0 | 0 | 0 | 0 | 0 | 0 | 0 | 0 | |
| Iloilo | 113,553 | 104,667 | 13,563 | 0 | 0 | 0 | 2 | 0 | 0 | 1 | 0 | |
| Iloilo City | 26,404 | 22,969 | 3,871 | 28 | 0 | 0 | 0 | 0 | 0 | 0 | 0 | |
| Isabela | 82,648 | 49,088 | 11,613 | 2 | 10 | 0 | 0 | 0 | 0 | 1 | 0 | |
| La Union | 74,910 | 13,409 | 896 | 0 | 0 | 0 | 0 | 0 | 0 | 0 | 0 | |
| Laguna | 82,648 | 49,088 | 11,613 | 2 | 10 | 0 | 0 | 0 | 1 | 0 | 0 | |
| Lanao del Norte | 18,179 | 37,367 | 774 | 0 | 0 | 1 | 0 | 0 | 0 | 0 | 0 | |
| Lanao del Sur | 25,918 | 93,847 | 241 | 0 | 0 | 0 | 1 | 0 | 2 | 0 | 0 | |
| Lapu-Lapu City | 4,595 | 5,604 | 537 | 0 | 0 | 0 | 0 | 0 | 0 | 0 | 0 | |
| Legazpi City | 9,567 | 7,129 | 1,121 | 0 | 0 | 0 | 0 | 0 | 0 | 0 | 0 | |
| Leyte | 108,781 | 91,512 | 1,960 | 0 | 1 | 1 | 0 | 0 | 0 | 0 | 0 | |
| Lipa City | 10,854 | 8,968 | 1,537 | 0 | 0 | 0 | 0 | 0 | 0 | 0 | 0 | |
| Lucena City | 5,486 | 7,517 | 1,987 | 0 | 0 | 0 | 0 | 0 | 0 | 0 | 0 | |
| Manila | 179,314 | 114,093 | 44,306 | 35 | 86 | 3 | 43 | 1 | 0 | 7 | 2 | |
| Marawi City | 6,187 | 6,069 | 155 | 0 | 0 | 0 | 0 | 0 | 0 | 0 | 0 | |
| Marinduque | 15,015 | 14,627 | 3,828 | 0 | 0 | 0 | 0 | 0 | 0 | 0 | 0 | |
| Masbate | 39,096 | 31,332 | 2,276 | 0 | 0 | 1 | 2 | 4 | 0 | 1 | 0 | |
| Misamis Occidental | 31,528 | 22,848 | 3,372 | 0 | 0 | 0 | 0 | 1 | 0 | 0 | 0 | |
| Misamis Oriental | 14,112 | 29,394 | 19,199 | 1 | 1 | 0 | 3 | 0 | 1 | 0 | 0 | |
| Mountain Province | 41,030 | 22,822 | 10,592 | 0 | 1 | 0 | 1 | 2 | 0 | 1 | 3 | |
| Naga City | 6,410 | 6,285 | 1,937 | 0 | 0 | 0 | 0 | 1 | 0 | 0 | 0 | |
| Negros Occidental | 102,690 | 101,663 | 10,698 | 0 | 1 | 0 | 2 | 76 | 0 | 0 | 0 | |
| Negros Oriental | 54,966 | 48,938 | 2,301 | 0 | 0 | 0 | 3 | 0 | 1 | 0 | 0 | |
| Nueva Ecija | 96,328 | 71,806 | 2,573 | 0 | 0 | 59 | 0 | 0 | 0 | 0 | 0 | |
| Nueva Vizcaya | 23,792 | 11,861 | 979 | 0 | 0 | 1 | 0 | 0 | 0 | 0 | 0 | |
| Occidental Mindoro | 16,606 | 12,614 | 311 | 0 | 0 | 0 | 0 | 0 | 0 | 0 | 0 | |
| Oriental Mindoro | 34,884 | 24,197 | 3,997 | 0 | 0 | 0 | 1 | 0 | 0 | 0 | 0 | |
| Ormoc City | 7,048 | 8,675 | 494 | 0 | 0 | 0 | 0 | 0 | 0 | 0 | 0 | |
| Ozamiz City | 7,387 | 5,486 | 2,554 | 0 | 0 | 0 | 0 | 0 | 0 | 0 | 0 | |
| Palawan | 21,215 | 18,553 | 710 | 0 | 2 | 0 | 1 | 0 | 0 | 0 | 0 | |
| Pampanga | 23,995 | 133,693 | 1,158 | 0 | 0 | 0 | 1 | 0 | 0 | 1 | 0 | |
| Pangasinan | 193,937 | 130,963 | 3,683 | 1 | 8 | 0 | 1 | 0 | 1 | 0 | 1 | |
| Pasay City | 23,417 | 14,725 | 5,388 | 0 | 0 | 0 | 0 | 0 | 0 | 2 | 0 | |
| Quezon | 89,216 | 73,738 | 14,802 | 10 | 0 | 2 | 0 | 1 | 0 | 1 | 0 | |
| Quezon City | 57,717 | 28,221 | 15,045 | 5 | 1 | 0 | 0 | 0 | 0 | 0 | 0 | |
| Rizal | 159,370 | 103,207 | 36,488 | 0 | 0 | 3 | 13 | 0 | 0 | 2 | 0 | |
| Romblon | 18,719 | 19,465 | 262 | 0 | 0 | 0 | 0 | 0 | 0 | 1 | 0 | |
| Roxas City | 6,426 | 9,768 | 487 | 0 | 0 | 0 | 0 | 0 | 0 | 0 | 0 | |
| Samar | 84,143 | 89,628 | 1,816 | 0 | 0 | 0 | 0 | 1 | 0 | 0 | 0 | |
| San Carlos City | 6,858 | 6,597 | 225 | 0 | 0 | 0 | 2 | 0 | 0 | 0 | 0 | |
| San Pablo City | 13,242 | 10,791 | 2,314 | 0 | 0 | 1 | 1 | 0 | 0 | 0 | 0 | |
| Silay City | 4,851 | 9,952 | 988 | 0 | 0 | 0 | 0 | 0 | 0 | 0 | 0 | |
| Sorsogon | 46,299 | 51,455 | 2,781 | 0 | 0 | 0 | 1 | 0 | 0 | 0 | 0 | |
| Southern Leyte | 33,657 | 23,083 | 859 | 0 | 0 | 0 | 0 | 0 | 0 | 0 | 0 | |
| Sulu | 24,971 | 35,972 | 2,841 | 0 | 0 | 0 | 5 | 2 | 0 | 1 | 0 | |
| Surigao del Norte | 22,327 | 35,521 | 826 | 0 | 0 | 0 | 0 | 0 | 0 | 0 | 0 | |
| Surigao del Sur | 26,549 | 20,940 | 1,398 | 0 | 0 | 0 | 0 | 0 | 0 | 0 | 0 | |
| Tacloban City | 10,481 | 7,360 | 389 | 0 | 0 | 0 | 0 | 0 | 0 | 0 | 0 | |
| Tagaytay City | 138 | 5,274 | 38 | 0 | 0 | 0 | 0 | 0 | 0 | 0 | 0 | |
| Tarlac | 60,969 | 68,240 | 2,018 | 0 | 0 | 2 | 1 | 0 | 0 | 0 | 0 | |
| Toledo City | 6,922 | 5,411 | 650 | 0 | 0 | 0 | 0 | 0 | 0 | 0 | 0 | |
| Trece Martires City | 103 | 1,390 | 0 | 0 | 0 | 0 | 0 | 0 | 0 | 0 | 0 | |
| Zambales | 52,042 | 13,449 | 3,962 | 0 | 3 | 0 | 0 | 12 | 0 | 1 | 0 | |
| Zamboanga City | 12,797 | 11,731 | 3,337 | 0 | 0 | 0 | 1 | 0 | 1 | 0 | 0 | |
| Zamboanga del Norte | 30,276 | 20,563 | 3,038 | 0 | 0 | 0 | 5 | 0 | 0 | 0 | 0 | |
| Zamboanga del Sur | 43,357 | 39,931 | 1,652 | 0 | 0 | 0 | 0 | 0 | 0 | 0 | 0 | |
| Total | 3,861,324 | 3,187,752 | 384,564 | 199 | 156 | 139 | 130 | 106 | 27 | 27 | 6 | 1 |
| Province/City | | | | | | | | | | | | |
| Province/City | Marcos | Macapagal | Manglapus | Bueno | Hidalgo | Baldove | Garces | Villanueva | Mercado | Nicolas | Ruan | Floro |

== Vice presidential election ==
| Candidate | Party | Votes | % |
|---|---|---|---|
| Fernando Lopez | Nacionalista Party | 3,531,550 | 48.48 |
| Gerry Roxas | Liberal Party | 3,504,826 | 48.11 |
| Manuel Manahan | Party for Philippine Progress | 247,426 | 3.40 |
| Gonzalo D. Vasquez | Reformist Party of the Philippines | 644 | 0.01 |
| Severo Capales | New Leaf Party | 193 | 0.00 |
| Eleodoro Salvador | Partido ng Bansa | 172 | 0.00 |
| Total | | 7,284,811 | 100.00 |
| Valid votes | | 7,284,811 | 95.73 |
| Invalid/blank votes | | 325,240 | 4.27 |
| Total votes | | 7,610,051 | 100.00 |
| Registered voters/turnout | | 9,962,345 | 76.39 |
Source: Nohlen, Grotz, Hartmann, Hasall and Santos

| Province/City | Lopez | Roxas | Manahan | Vasquez | Capales | Salvador |
|---|---|---|---|---|---|---|
| Abra | 18,331 | 16,095 | 429 | 1 | 0 | 0 |
| Agusan | 27,358 | 37,149 | 660 | 0 | 2 | 1 |
| Aklan | 31,218 | 34,078 | 390 | 0 | 0 | 0 |
| Angeles City | 4,261 | 11,234 | 376 | 3 | 1 | 0 |
| Albay | 58,760 | 49,721 | 3,617 | 7 | 0 | 0 |
| Antique | 30,131 | 24,873 | 1,730 | 3 | 1 | 4 |
| Bacolod City | 20,235 | 16,499 | 2,078 | 1 | 0 | 0 |
| Baguio | 8,586 | 7,630 | 1,363 | 0 | 0 | 0 |
| Basilan City | 6,440 | 5,826 | 528 | 0 | 0 | 1 |
| Bataan | 27,735 | 25,843 | 1,588 | 1 | 15 | 0 |
| Batanes | 1,336 | 2,497 | 29 | 0 | 0 | 3 |
| Batangas | 119,599 | 70,112 | 5,993 | 14 | 6 | 3 |
| Bohol | 99,011 | 63,720 | 1,039 | 2 | 1 | 0 |
| Bukidnon | 18,564 | 23,492 | 4,056 | 0 | 4 | 0 |
| Bulacan | 109,670 | 101,284 | 6,591 | 3 | 7 | 1 |
| Butuan | 16,810 | 20,347 | 562 | 50 | 0 | 0 |
| Cabanatuan | 11,851 | 9,455 | 567 | 0 | 0 | 9 |
| Cagayan | 78,187 | 29,756 | 2,894 | 1 | 1 | 7 |
| Cagayan de Oro | 4,526 | 11,009 | 3,768 | 0 | 7 | 0 |
| Calbayog | 8,439 | 8,744 | 35 | 0 | 0 | 0 |
| Caloocan | 19,518 | 21,731 | 2,591 | 2 | 1 | 1 |
| Camarines Norte | 22,388 | 27,262 | 1,952 | 2 | 1 | 1 |
| Camarines Sur | 77,221 | 75,871 | 3,634 | 9 | 0 | 0 |
| Canlaon | 1,150 | 1,204 | 1,010 | 0 | 0 | 0 |
| Capiz | 30,552 | 40,068 | 571 | 0 | 0 | 0 |
| Catanduanes | 12,066 | 24,542 | 678 | 1 | 0 | 0 |
| Cavite | 40,974 | 64,290 | 1,880 | 7 | 0 | 0 |
| Cavite City | 6,508 | 6,839 | 1,627 | 1 | 0 | 0 |
| Cebu | 95,403 | 140,245 | 5,048 | 55 | 3 | 5 |
| Cebu City | 23,211 | 41,562 | 4,127 | 8 | 0 | 1 |
| Cotabato | 74,278 | 145,167 | 6,028 | 19 | 2 | 30 |
| Cotabato City | 3,302 | 4,748 | 519 | 0 | 0 | 0 |
| Dagupan | 10,229 | 11,041 | 469 | 3 | 0 | 0 |
| Danao | 10,993 | 1,464 | 47 | 1 | 0 | 0 |
| Dapitan | 4,260 | 4,281 | 220 | 0 | 0 | 0 |
| Davao | 71,390 | 60,355 | 2,990 | 5 | 0 | 0 |
| Davao City | 33,709 | 31,067 | 2,681 | 4 | 1 | 0 |
| Dumaguete | 5,394 | 5,669 | 445 | 2 | 0 | 0 |
| Gingoog | 3,398 | 4,136 | 1,661 | 0 | 0 | 1 |
| Iligan City | 7,333 | 8,369 | 643 | 0 | 0 | 0 |
| Ilocos Norte | 84,612 | 6,639 | 454 | 1 | 0 | 12 |
| Ilocos Sur | 86,388 | 20,536 | 2,710 | 0 | 0 | 0 |
| Iloilo | 135,547 | 90,928 | 3,181 | 1 | 0 | 0 |
| Iloilo City | 31,239 | 20,648 | 1,302 | 1 | 0 | 0 |
| Isabela | 66,515 | 32,242 | 1,219 | 1 | 0 | 7 |
| La Union | 65,183 | 19,429 | 4,246 | 3 | 1 | 0 |
| Laguna | 72,159 | 58,427 | 7,884 | 4 | 4 | 1 |
| Lanao del Norte | 14,801 | 39,174 | 572 | 2 | 0 | 0 |
| Lanao del Sur | 18,651 | 87,487 | 2,144 | 120 | 2 | 0 |
| Lapu-Lapu City | 3,978 | 6,047 | 373 | 1 | 0 | 0 |
| Legazpi City | 9,288 | 7,796 | 557 | 1 | 0 | 0 |
| Leyte | 100,661 | 96,715 | 1,090 | 1 | 1 | 0 |
| Lipa City | 10,630 | 8,744 | 954 | 0 | 0 | 0 |
| Lucena City | 4,442 | 9,092 | 1,256 | 1 | 0 | 0 |
| Manila | 150,882 | 157,677 | 27,453 | 41 | 50 | 6 |
| Marawi City | 4,661 | 5,610 | 671 | 25 | 0 | 0 |
| Marinduque | 12,665 | 16,679 | 3,342 | 3 | 0 | 0 |
| Masbate | 35,797 | 32,683 | 1,901 | 3 | 0 | 2 |
| Misamis Occidental | 28,291 | 26,342 | 1,797 | 0 | 1 | 1 |
| Misamis Oriental | 14,332 | 31,498 | 13,224 | 6 | 2 | 4 |
| Mountain Province | 35,901 | 28,006 | 10,326 | 2 | 0 | 0 |
| Naga City | 5,474 | 7,933 | 1,083 | 1 | 0 | 0 |
| Negros Occidental | 106,859 | 101,577 | 4,257 | 1 | 0 | 0 |
| Negros Oriental | 51,785 | 51,126 | 1,199 | 1 | 0 | 0 |
| Nueva Ecija | 87,677 | 77,700 | 2,650 | 1 | 0 | 45 |
| Nueva Vizcaya | 19,425 | 15,885 | 1,018 | 1 | 0 | 1 |
| Occidental Mindoro | 14,426 | 14,290 | 386 | 5 | 3 | 1 |
| Oriental Mindoro | 30,388 | 28,677 | 2,859 | 6 | 0 | 0 |
| Ormoc City | 6,353 | 9,493 | 187 | 1 | 0 | 0 |
| Ozamiz City | 6,054 | 7,557 | 1,383 | 0 | 0 | 0 |
| Palawan | 19,190 | 20,138 | 579 | 0 | 1 | 0 |
| Pampanga | 35,166 | 117,962 | 2,109 | 26 | 0 | 1 |
| Pangasinan | 171,498 | 151,182 | 3,414 | 2 | 5 | 1 |
| Pasay City | 21,329 | 19,063 | 2,965 | 2 | 0 | 0 |
| Quezon | 82,131 | 84,153 | 8,787 | 3 | 2 | 0 |
| Quezon City | 48,036 | 42,205 | 10,259 | 18 | 5 | 0 |
| Rizal | 135,462 | 137,648 | 22,152 | 43 | 18 | 2 |
| Romblon | 18,050 | 19,845 | 286 | 0 | 0 | 0 |
| Roxas City | 5,176 | 11,413 | 102 | 0 | 0 | 0 |
| Samar | 71,896 | 96,697 | 1,031 | 2 | 30 | 2 |
| San Carlos City | 6,344 | 6,885 | 97 | 2 | 0 | 0 |
| San Pablo City | 11,145 | 13,247 | 1,343 | 0 | 0 | 0 |
| Silay City | 8,416 | 6,553 | 658 | 0 | 0 | 0 |
| Sorsogon | 42,270 | 53,966 | 1,760 | 1 | 1 | 1 |
| Southern Leyte | 32,384 | 23,695 | 581 | 7 | 1 | 0 |
| Sulu | 19,956 | 35,101 | 2,212 | 0 | 1 | 1 |
| Surigao del Norte | 20,365 | 36,987 | 510 | 67 | 1 | 0 |
| Surigao del Sur | 23,845 | 23,249 | 900 | 10 | 0 | 2 |
| Tacloban City | 9,238 | 8,648 | 210 | 0 | 0 | 1 |
| Tagaytay City | 147 | 5,157 | 17 | 0 | 0 | 0 |
| Tarlac | 51,786 | 75,293 | 2,112 | 11 | 0 | 8 |
| Toledo City | 5,057 | 6,858 | 431 | 1 | 0 | 0 |
| Trece Martires City | 127 | 1,296 | 24 | 0 | 0 | 0 |
| Zambales | 45,205 | 20,575 | 2,390 | 4 | 1 | 1 |
| Zamboanga City | 11,617 | 13,991 | 1,484 | 1 | 0 | 0 |
| Zamboanga del Norte | 28,022 | 23,227 | 1,169 | 5 | 9 | 1 |
| Zamboanga del Sur | 38,333 | 43,880 | 1,052 | 0 | 1 | 2 |
| Total | 3,531,550 | 3,504,826 | 247,426 | 644 | 193 | 172 |
| Province/City | | | | | | |
| Province/City | Lopez | Roxas | Manahan | Vasquez | Capales | Salvador |
