= Gerardo Roxas Jr. =

Filipino politician (1960–1993)

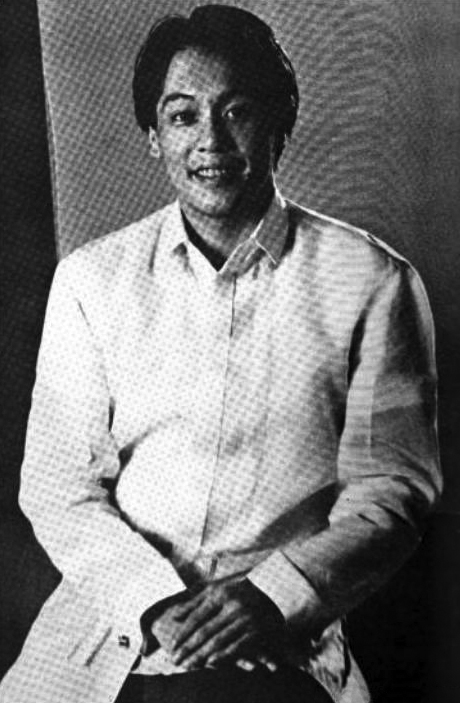
- Roxas official portrait during the 8th Congress.

Member of the Philippine House of Representatives from Capiz's 1st district
- In office June 30, 1987 – April 4, 1993
- Preceded by: Juliano Alba
- Succeeded by: Mar Roxas

Personal details
- Born: Gerardo Araneta Roxas Jr. October 21, 1960 Manila, Philippines
- Died: April 4, 1993 (aged 32) Quezon City, Philippines
- Resting place: Loyola Memorial Park
- Party: Liberal (1987–1993)
- Relations: Mar Roxas (brother); Manuel Roxas (grandfather)
- Children: 1
- Parent(s): Gerry Roxas; Judy Araneta
- Education: University of the Philippines Diliman (L.L.B.)
- Occupation: Politician
- Nickname: Dinggoy Roxas

Gerardo "Dinggoy" Araneta Roxas Jr. (October 21, 1960 – April 4, 1993) was a Filipino politician who served as the representative for Capiz's first district from 1987 until his death in 1993. A member of the Liberal Party, he was the brother of former Senator and Secretary of the Interior and Local Government Mar Roxas and grandson of former President Manuel Roxas.

== Early life ==
Gerardo Araneta Roxas Jr. was born on October 21, 1960, in Manila, Philippines, to Gerry Roxas (1924–1982) of Capiz and Judy Araneta of Bago, Negros Occidental. Roxas' father, a senator from 1963 to 1972, was the only son of Manuel Roxas, the fifth President of the Philippines, and Trinidad de Leon. The couple married in 1955. He has two siblings, namely: Maria Lourdes ("Ria") and Manuel II ("Mar").

Like his father before him, he joined the Upsilon Sigma Phi while studying at the University of the Philippines College of Law.

== House of Representatives ==
Roxas ran for a seat in the House of Representatives of the Philippines in the May 11, 1987, Philippine legislative election at the age of 26, becoming the youngest elected representative. Roxas was the presiding officer of the inaugural session, until Ramon Mitra Jr. was elected as speaker.

== Death ==
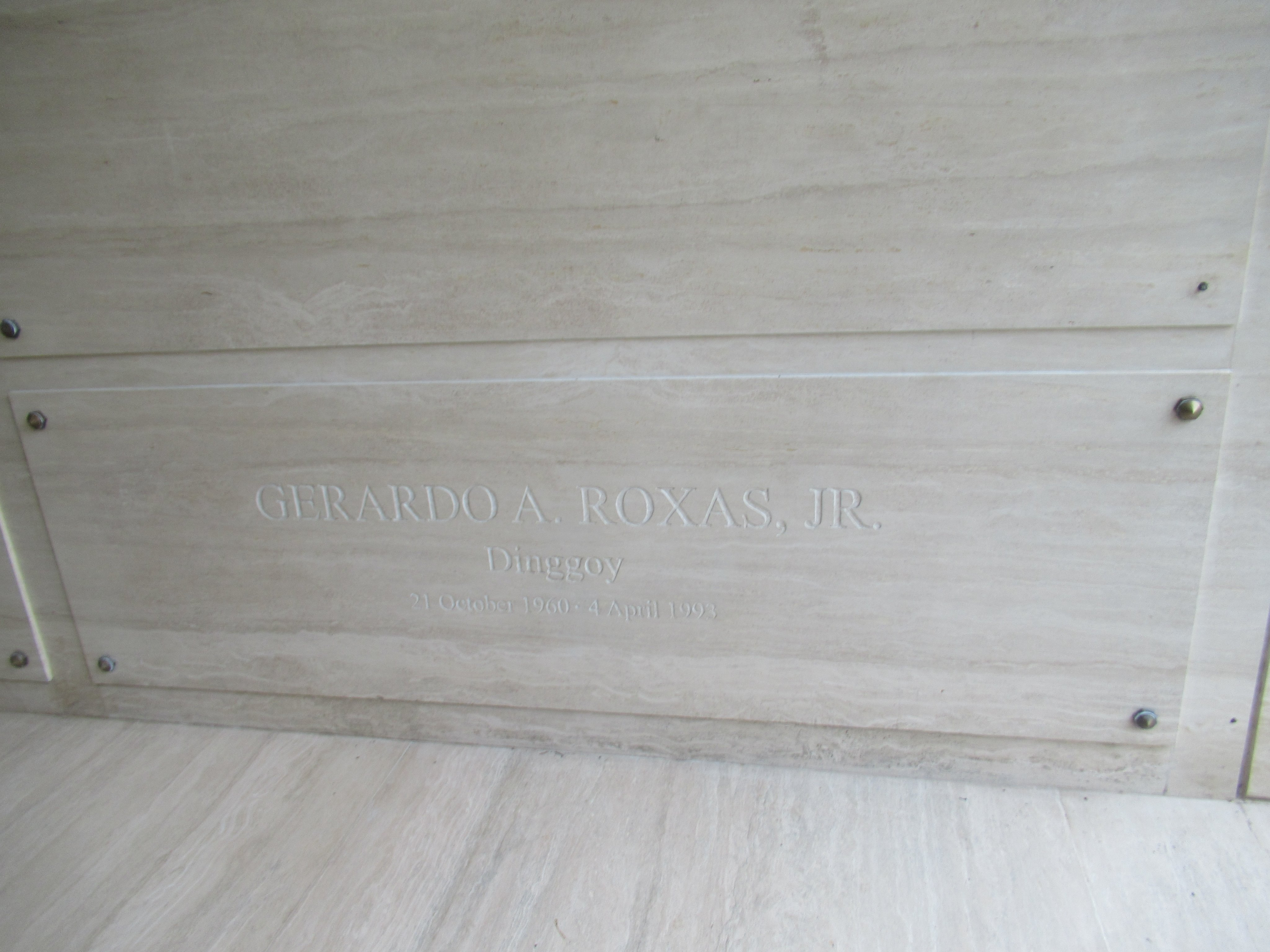
Roxas Jr.'s tomb (Loyola Memorial Park)

Roxas died on April 4, 1993, from colon cancer, months after another Capiz representative, Cornelio Villareal, died. He was buried at Manila North Cemetery in Santa Cruz, Manila. Years later, his family decided to transfer his remains to the Loyola Memorial Park.

== Legacy ==
- Dinggoy Araneta Roxas Elementary School - Quezon City
- Dinggoy Roxas Civic Center - Roxas City, Capiz
- Dinggoy Roxas Memorial Park - Roxas City, Capiz
- Gerry Roxas Foundation - Quezon City

House of Representatives of the Philippines
Recreated Title last held by Juliano Alba	Representative, Capiz's 1st District; 1987–1993	Succeeded by Mar Roxas
