= 1961 Philippine House of Representatives elections =

12th Philippine House of Representatives elections

- November 14, 1961

All 104 seats in the House of Representatives of the Philippines 53 seats needed for a majority
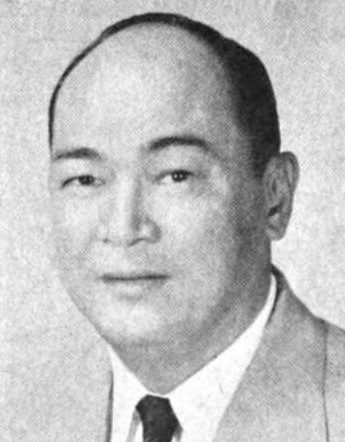

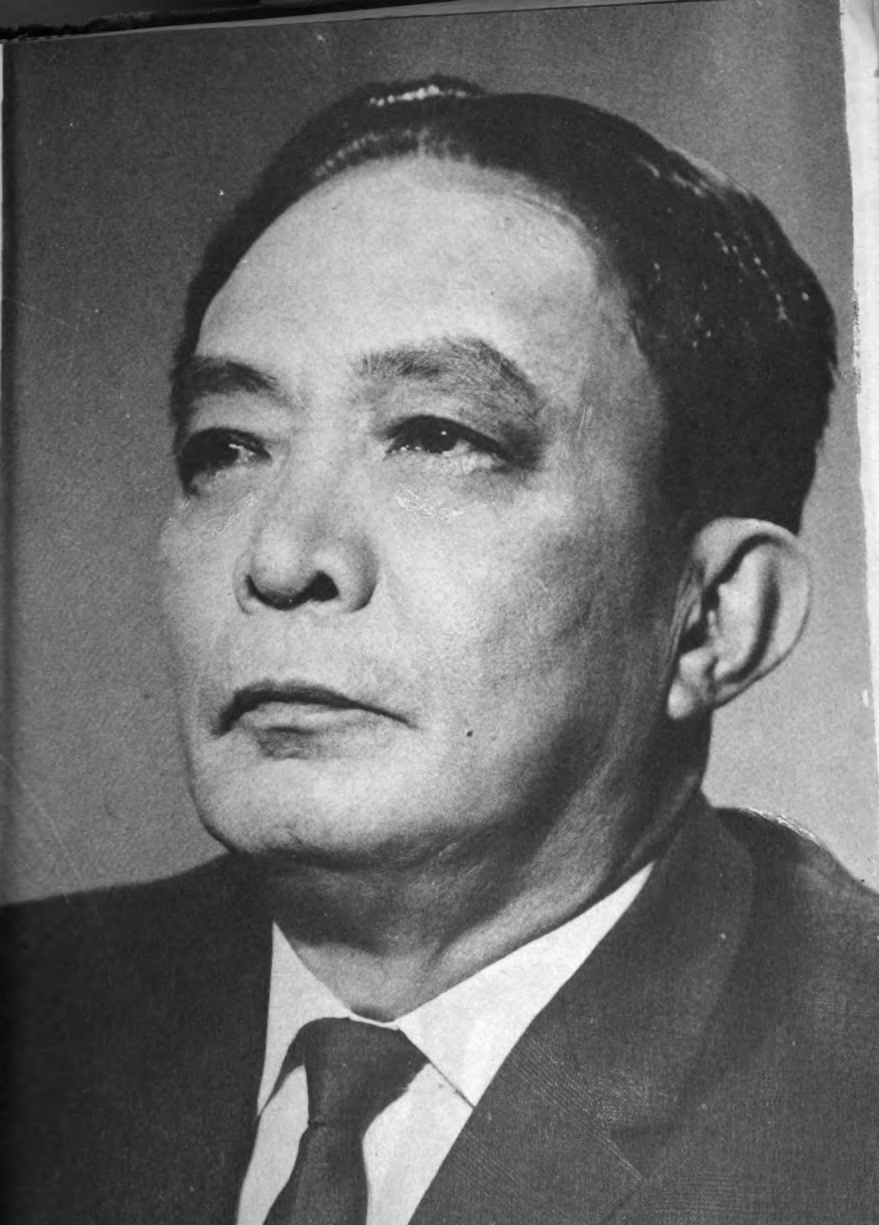
	Majority party	Minority party
Leader	Daniel Romualdez	Cornelio Villareal
Party	Nacionalista	Liberal
Leader's seat	Leyte–1st	Capiz–2nd
Last election	82 seats, 61.19%	19 seats, 30.17%
Seats won	74	29
Seat change	▼8	▲10
Popular vote	3,923,390	2,167,641
Percentage	61.02	33.71
Swing	▼0.17	▲3.54
Speaker before election
Daniel Romualdez
Nacionalista
Elected Speaker
Cornelio Villareal
Liberal

Elections for the House of Representatives of the Philippines were held on November 14, 1961. Held on the same day as the presidential election, the party of the incumbent president, Carlos P. Garcia's Nacionalista Party, won majority of the seats in the House of Representatives. However, Diosdado Macapagal of the opposition Liberal Party won the presidential election, leading to majority of the elected Nacionalista congressmen to defect to the Liberal Party. This led to Cornelio Villareal being elected Speaker of the House of Representatives.

The elected representatives served in the 5th Congress from 1961 to 1965.

== Electoral system ==
The House of Representatives has at most 120 seats, 104 seats for this election, all voted via first-past-the-post in single-member districts. Each province is guaranteed at least one congressional district, with more populous provinces divided into two or more districts.

Congress has the power of redistricting three years after each census.

== Results ==
Party	Votes	%	+/–	Seats	+/–
Nacionalista Party	3,923,390	61.02	−0.17	74	−8
Liberal Party	2,167,641	33.71	+3.54	29	+10
Nacionalista Party (independent)	47,614	0.74	+0.68	0	0
Liberal Party (independent)	40,220	0.63	−0.44	0	0
Nationalist Citizens' Party	7,837	0.12	−2.73	0	0
Independent	243,110	3.78	+1.44	1	New
Total	6,429,812	100.00	–	104	+2
Valid votes	6,429,812	95.41	+1.08		
Invalid/blank votes	308,993	4.59	−1.08		
Total votes	6,738,805	100.00	–		
Registered voters/turnout	8,483,568	79.43	+3.91		
Source: Nohlen, Grotz and Hartmann and Teehankee

Vote share
NP	61.02%
LP	33.71%
Others	5.27%

Seats
NP	71.15%
LP	27.88%
Others	0.96%

== See also ==
- 5th Congress of the Philippines

== Bibliography ==
- Paras, Corazon L. (2000). The Presidents of the Senate of the Republic of the Philippines. Giraffe Books. ISBN 971-8832-24-6.
- Pobre, Cesar P. (2000). Philippine Legislature 100 Years. Philippine Historical Association. ISBN 971-92245-0-9.
