= Gerry Roxas =

Filipino lawyer and politician (1924–1982)

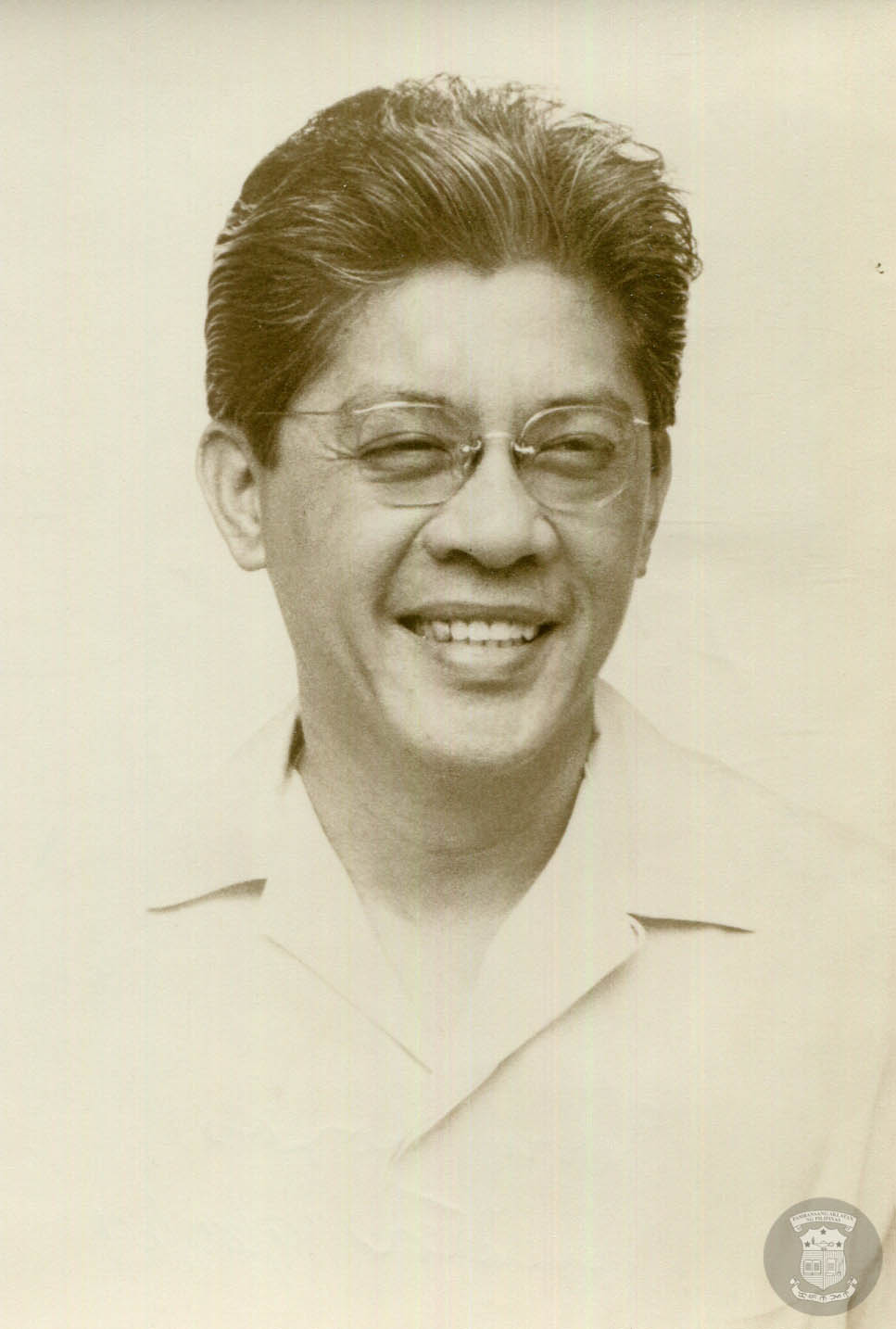

Senator of the Philippines
- In office December 30, 1963 – September 23, 1972

Senate Minority Leader
- In office January 26, 1970 – September 23, 1972
- Preceded by: Ambrosio Padilla
- Succeeded by: Position abolished (post later held by Joseph Estrada)

Member of the Philippine House of Representatives from Capiz's 1st District
- In office December 30, 1957 – December 30, 1963
- Preceded by: Carmen Dinglasan Consing
- Succeeded by: Vacant; Post later held by Mariano H. Acuña

8th President of the Liberal Party
- In office May 10, 1969 – April 19, 1982
- Preceded by: Cornelio Villareal
- Succeeded by: Jovito Salonga

Personal details
- Born: Gerardo Manuel de Leon Roxas; August 25, 1924 Manila, Philippine Islands
- Died: April 19, 1982 (aged 57) New York City, U.S.
- Resting place: Loyola Memorial Park
- Party: Liberal (1957–1982)
- Other political affiliations: UNIDO (1980–1982)
- Spouse: Judith "Judy" Araneta (m. 1955)
- Children: Maria Lourdes "Ria" A. Roxas-Ojeda; Manuel "Mar" A. Roxas II; Gerardo "Dinggoy" A. Roxas Jr.
- Parents: Manuel Roxas (father); Trinidad de Leon (mother)
- Education: De La Salle College; Ateneo de Manila University
- Alma mater: University of the Philippines
- Profession: Politician

Gerardo Manuel "Gerry" de Leon Roxas Sr. (Tagalog pronunciation: [ˈɾɔhas]; August 25, 1924 – April 19, 1982) was a Filipino lawyer and politician. As a representative of the 1st District of Capiz (1957 to 1963) and, later, as a Senator of the Republic of the Philippines (1963 to 1972), Gerry Roxas sponsored legislation that benefited the masses, improved living conditions, provided employment and family income and in general, promoted equitable sharing in the wealth of the nation. He also wrote many bills of national importance and was consistently voted by the Philippines Free Press and other national publications as one of the outstanding Senators of the Philippines. He was one of two children of former Philippine President Manuel Roxas and Trinidad de Leon-Roxas. He was the father of Gerardo "Dinggoy" A. Roxas, Jr. and former Department of the Interior and Local Government (DILG) Secretary Manuel "Mar" A. Roxas II.

== Early life and education ==
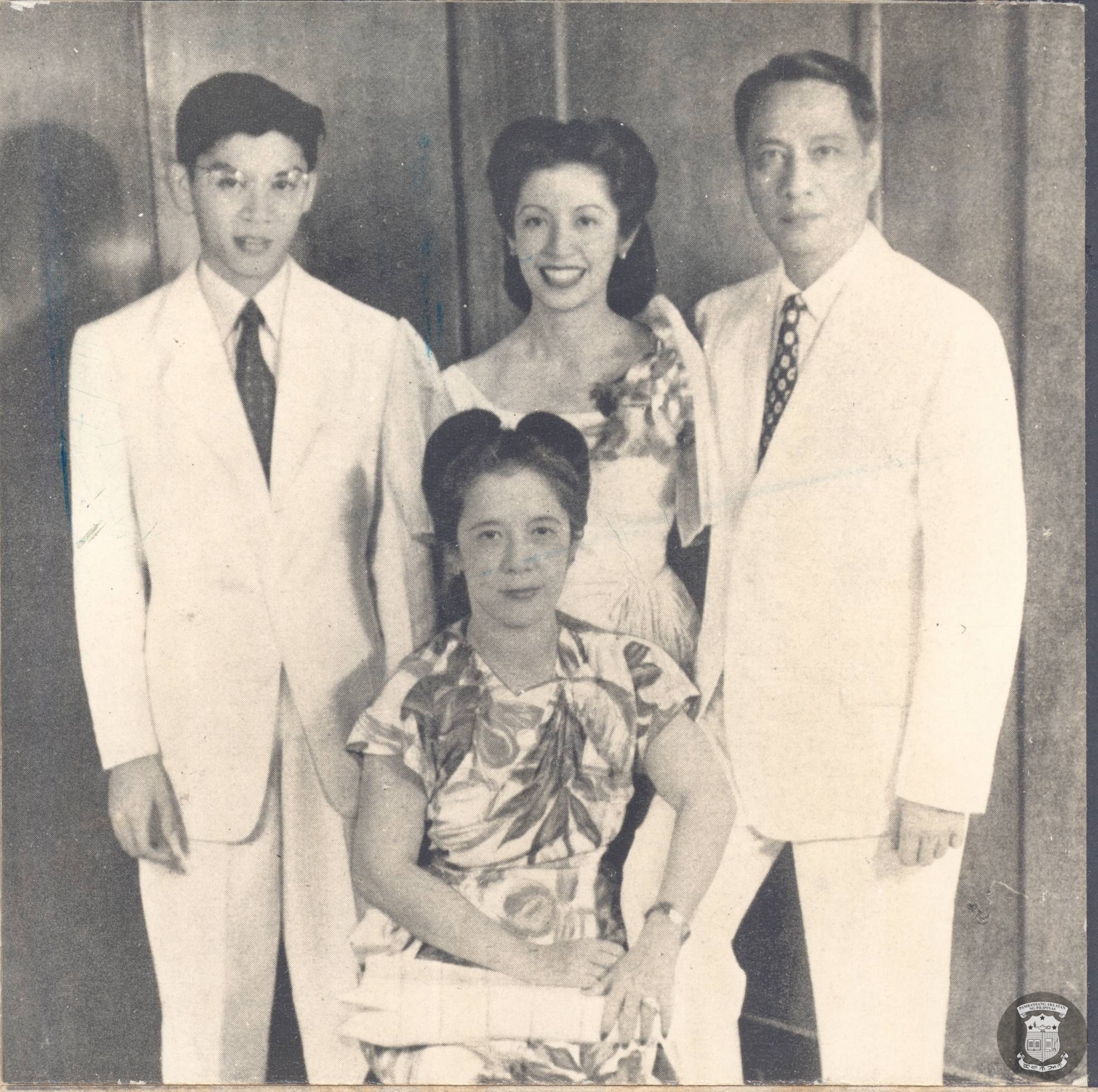
Gerardo Roxas (left) with his parents and sister

Gerardo Manuel de Leon Roxas, also known as Gerry, was born on August 25, 1924, in Manila to Manuel Acuña Roxas, who was then the House Speaker and 1st district representative of Capiz, and Trinidad De Leon. Gerry was 22 when his father was elected President of the Philippines and was 24 when his father died due to heart attack.

He finished elementary school at the De La Salle College and high school at the Ateneo de Manila. He studied law at the University of the Philippines College of Law and graduated in 1949. There, he was a member of the Upsilon Sigma Phi fraternity. The following year, he was admitted to the Philippine Bar.

== Political career ==
In 1957, he was elected Congressman of the 1st District of Capiz and won with an overwhelming majority. As a young congressman, Gerry Roxas established the Roxas Educational Advancement Committee in 1958. The organization provided scholarship grants to youths in Capiz province. The program later expanded to the nationwide Gerry Roxas Leadership Awards (1967) to motivate and develop the youth's potentials in leadership and service to country. This nationwide program continues to this day. He was re-elected in 1961.

Roxas led the Liberal Party senatorial slate in 1963 and, after an exciting contest, emerged the top-notcher, obtaining the highest number of votes cast for a national candidate. In 1965, he ran for vice president as the running mate of then-President Diosdado Macapagal. In the unfinished counting of the abruptly stopped Comelec tabulation, he lost by merely 26,724 votes, the narrowest margin ever recorded in Philippine vice presidential elections, to Fernando Lopez. He ran for re-election in the 1969 senatorial elections and emerged as the sole survivor of the entire Liberal Party senatorial slate. He was named as the Senate Minority Leader in 1970. Roxas was among the injured during the Plaza Miranda bombing that occurred during the party's political rally in 1971.

== Martial law years ==
Gerry Roxas served as Philippine Senator until September 1972, when Martial Law was declared by then-President and dictator Ferdinand Marcos. At that time, he was President of the Liberal Party and was also co-Chairman of the United Nationalist Democratic Organization (UNIDO), a multi-sector network which galvanized societal opposition to Martial Law.

== Personal life ==
In 1955, Gerry Roxas married Judy, the daughter of J. Amado and Ester Araneta, with whom he had three children: Maria Lourdes, Manuel II, and Gerardo Jr.

== Death ==
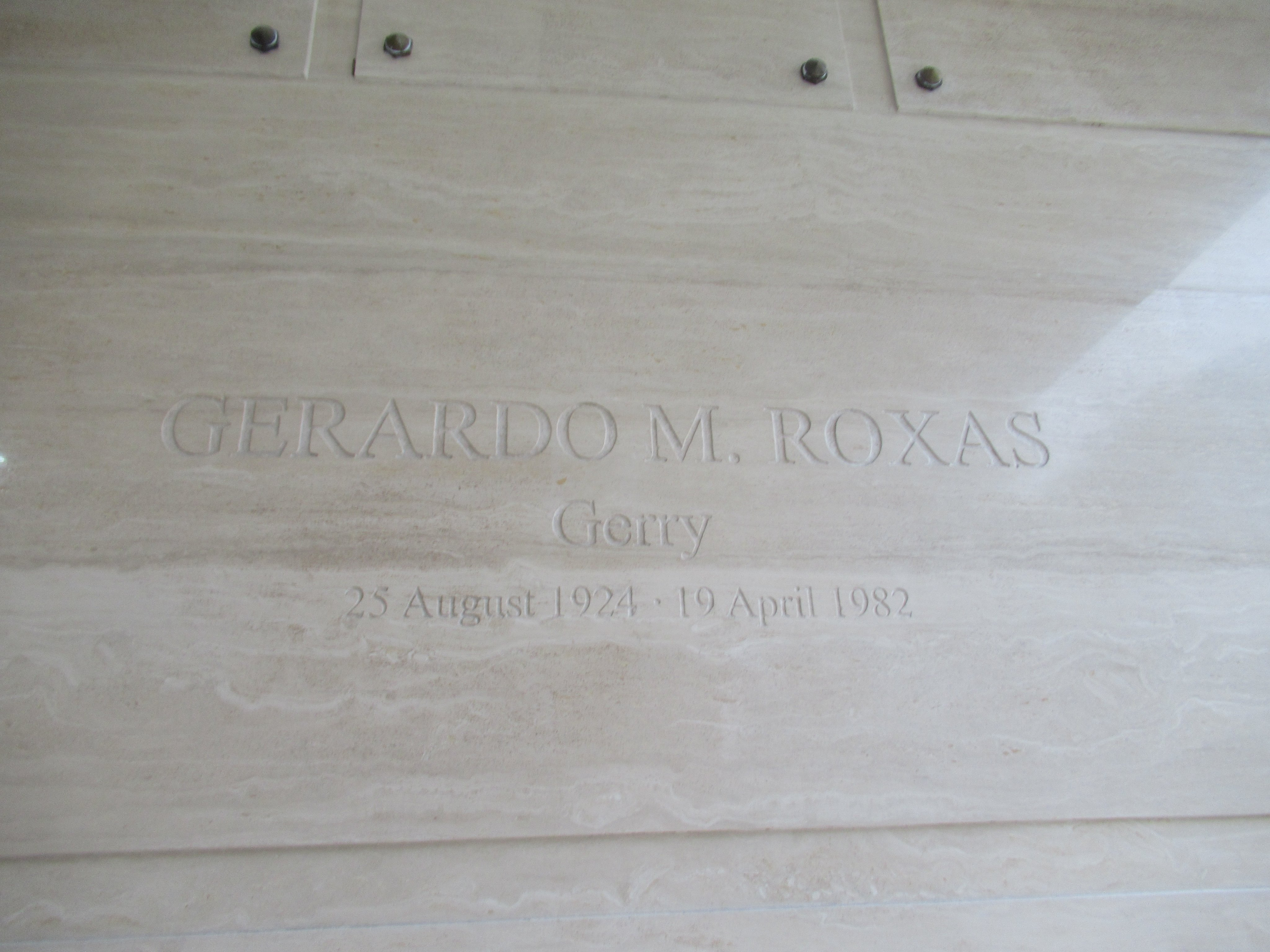
Roxas's tomb (Loyola Memorial Park)

Roxas died on April 19, 1982, at the age of 57 at Lenox Hill Hospital in New York City due to complications from a liver tumor. His remains were initially interred at the Manila North Cemetery in Manila. Years later, his family decided to transfer his remains to the Loyola Memorial Park. in Marikina City.

== Legacy ==
=== Gerry Roxas Foundation ===
His legacy continues to the present through the institution that bears his name – the Gerry Roxas Foundation. The foundation implements programs towards local governance development, barangay justice and peace, health services, youth leadership and development finance. The foundation is headed by his widow, Judy Araneta-Roxas, with his son, Mar Roxas's assistance as an honorary member of the board of trustees.

=== Quotations ===
"You must continue as I must continue to fight, Because we have been pampered by our people. We have been elected to serve and in service we must give all."

— Gerry Roxas to Ninoy Aquino, Ninoy Aquino's Eulogy to Gerry Roxas. Ninoy Aquino and Gerry Roxas have a very close relationship aside from being part of the same political party.

"Only when we are vigilant – ready to participate in the public dialogue, militant in the protection of our cherished rights and assertive in the invalid of constructive dissent—will we be able to reverse the downward trend and ensure the ascendancy of a truly democratic and resilient state, a society responsive to the challenges we face."

— Gerry Roxas

Offices and distinctions
House of Representatives of the Philippines
Preceded by Carmen Dinglasan Consing	Congressman, 1st District of Capiz; 1957–1963	Vacant Title next held by Mariano H. Acuña
Senate of the Philippines
Preceded by Ambrosio Padilla	Senate Minority Leader; 1970–1972	Vacant Position abolished due to Martial Law Title next held by Juan Ponce Enrile
Party political offices
Preceded by Emmanuel Pelaez	Liberal Party nominee for Vice President of the Philippines; 1965	Succeeded by Genaro Magsaysay
Preceded by Cornelio T. Villareal	President of the Liberal Party; 1969–1982	Succeeded by Jovito Salonga
