= 1965 Philippine presidential election =

8th election of Philippine president

- November 9, 1965
- Turnout: 76.4% (▼3.0pp)
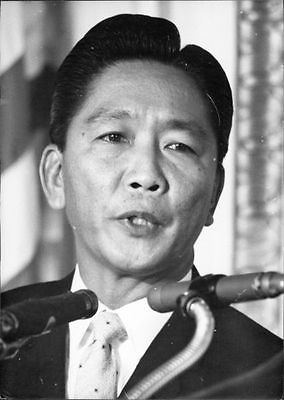

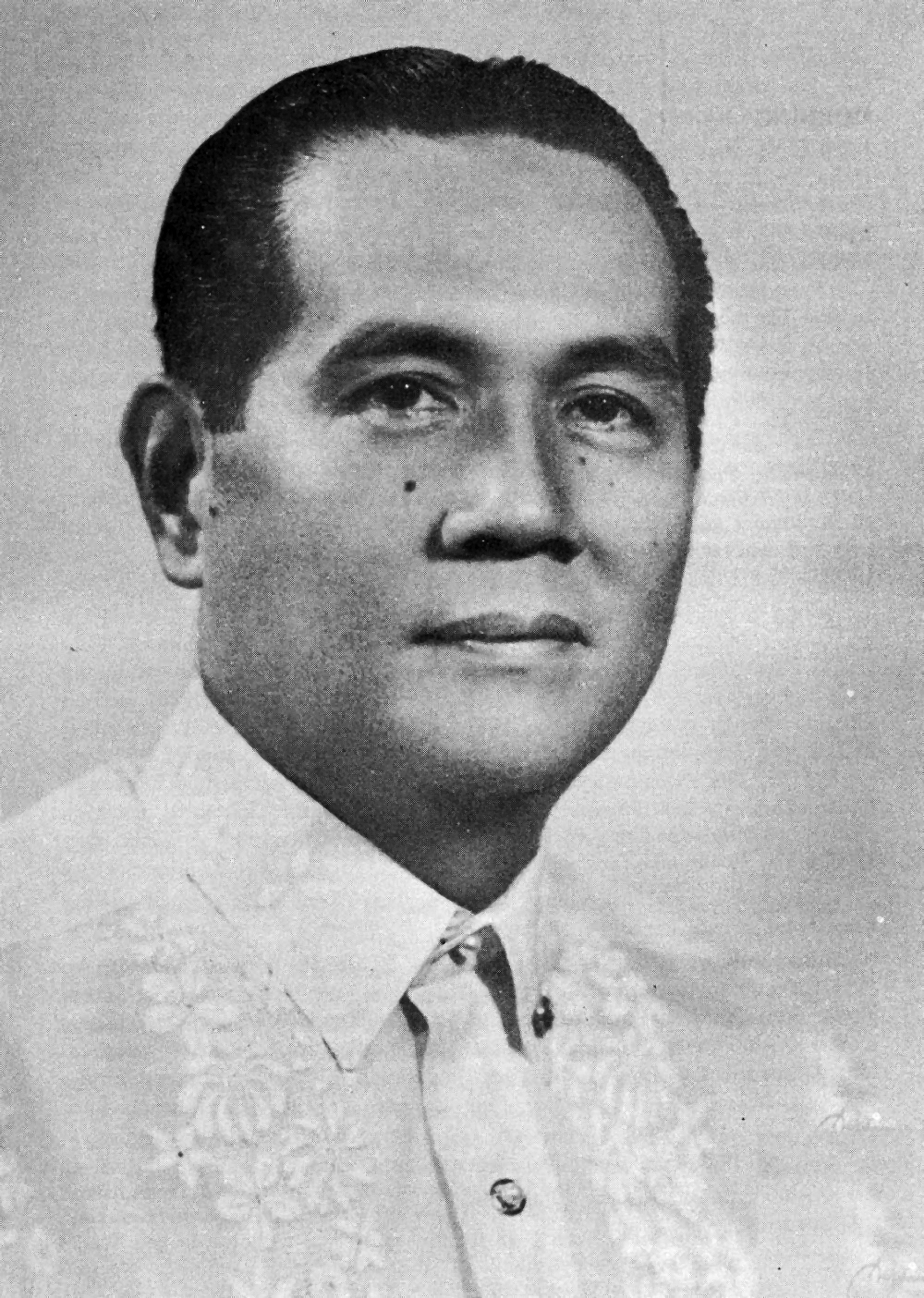

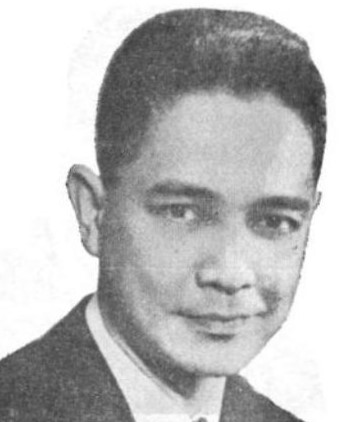
Candidate	Ferdinand Marcos	Diosdado Macapagal	Raul Manglapus
Party	Nacionalista	Liberal	Progressive
Running mate	Fernando Lopez	Gerry Roxas	Manuel Manahan
Popular vote	3,861,324	3,187,752	384,564
Percentage	51.94%	42.88%	5.17%
- Election results per province/city.
President before election
Diosdado Macapagal
Liberal
Elected President
Ferdinand E. Marcos
Nacionalista
- 1965 Philippine vice presidential election
- November 9, 1965
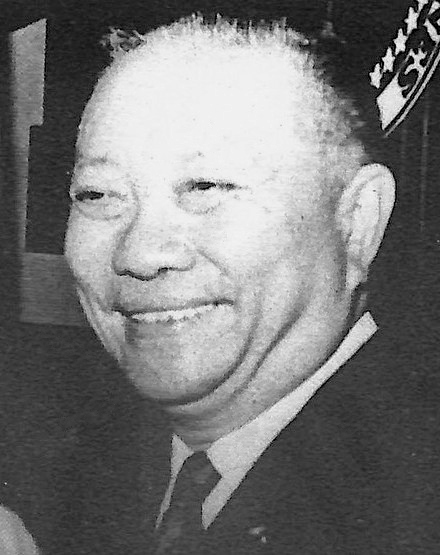

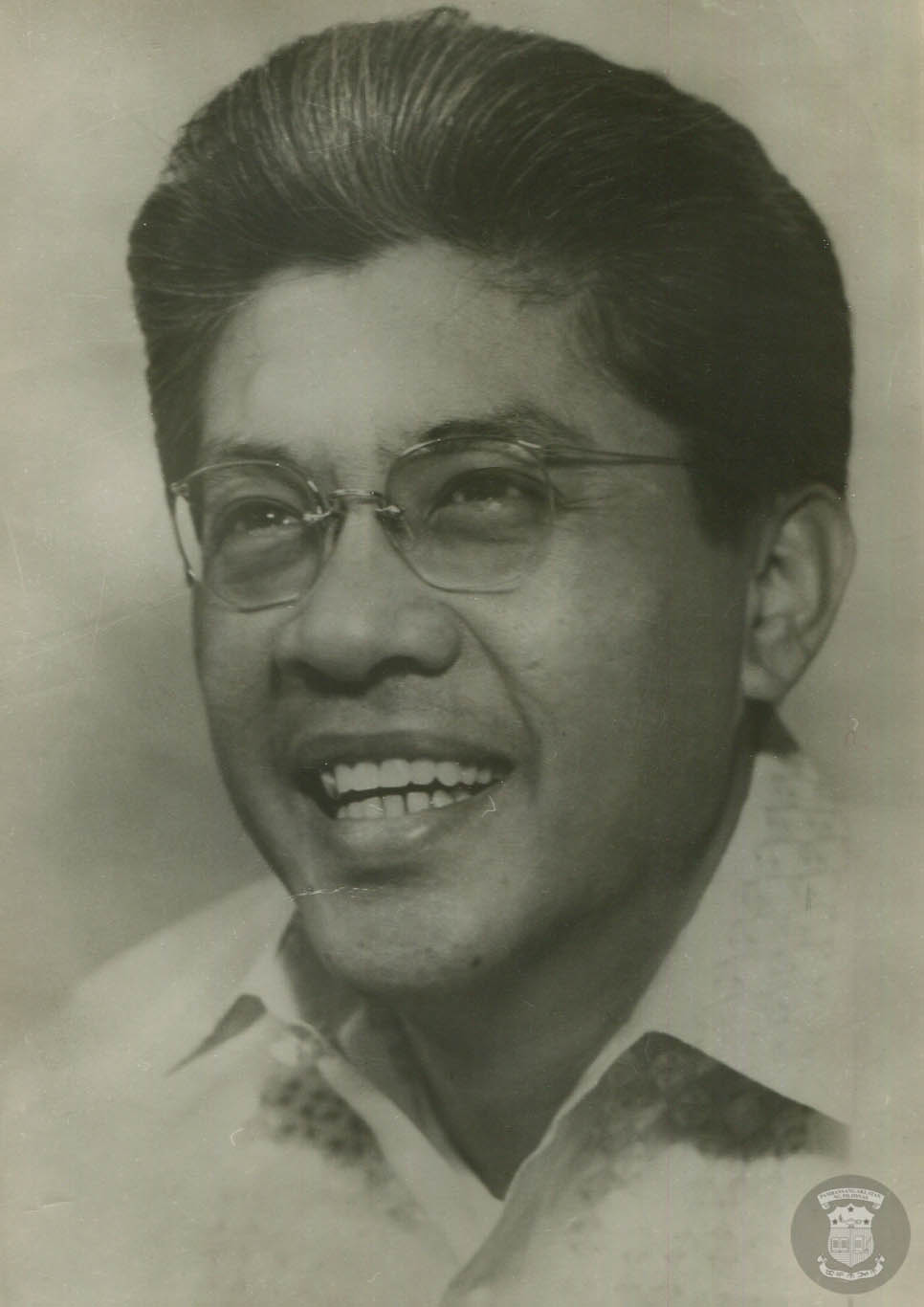

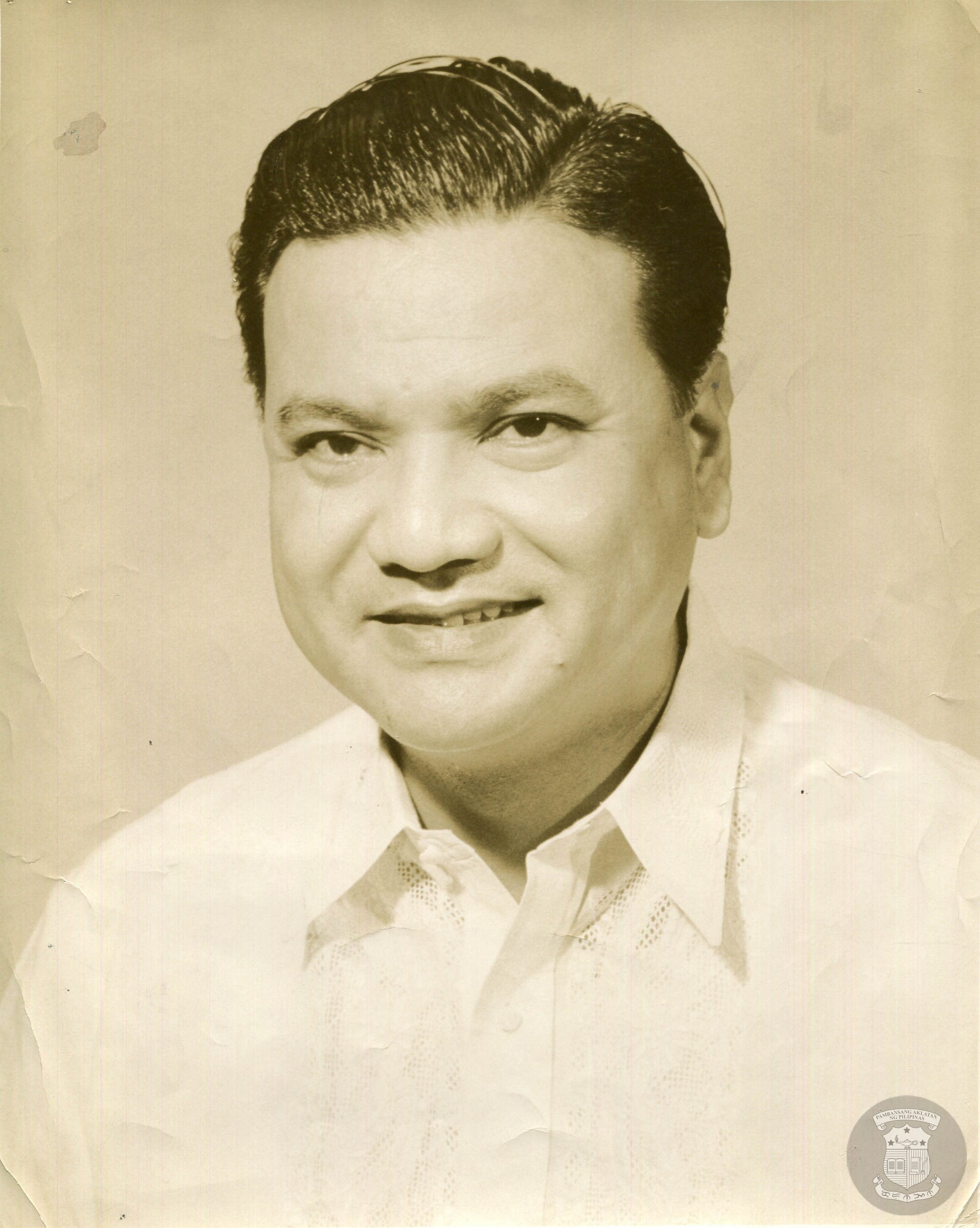
Candidate	Fernando Lopez	Gerry Roxas	Manuel Manahan
Party	Nacionalista	Liberal	Progressive
Popular vote	3,531,550	3,504,826	247,426
Percentage	48.48%	48.11%	3.40%
- Election results per province/city.
Vice President before election
Emmanuel Pelaez
Nacionalista
Elected Vice President
Fernando Lopez
Nacionalista

Presidential and vice presidential elections were held in the Philippines on November 9, 1965. Incumbent President Diosdado Macapagal lost his opportunity to get a second full term as president of the Philippines to Senate President Ferdinand Marcos. His running mate, Senator Gerardo Roxas, lost to former vice president Fernando Lopez. Emmanuel Pelaez, who resigned in the Cabinet and from the Liberal Party, then sought the Nacionalista Party presidential nomination and lost it to Marcos, did not run for vice president and instead ran for the Misamis Oriental seat in the House of Representatives as an independent. An unprecedented twelve candidates ran for president; however, nine of those each garnered less than 200 votes.

This was the first election where all of the major presidential candidates were born after the end of the Spanish colonization of the Philippines.

== Background ==
=== Macapagal Reelection Campaign ===
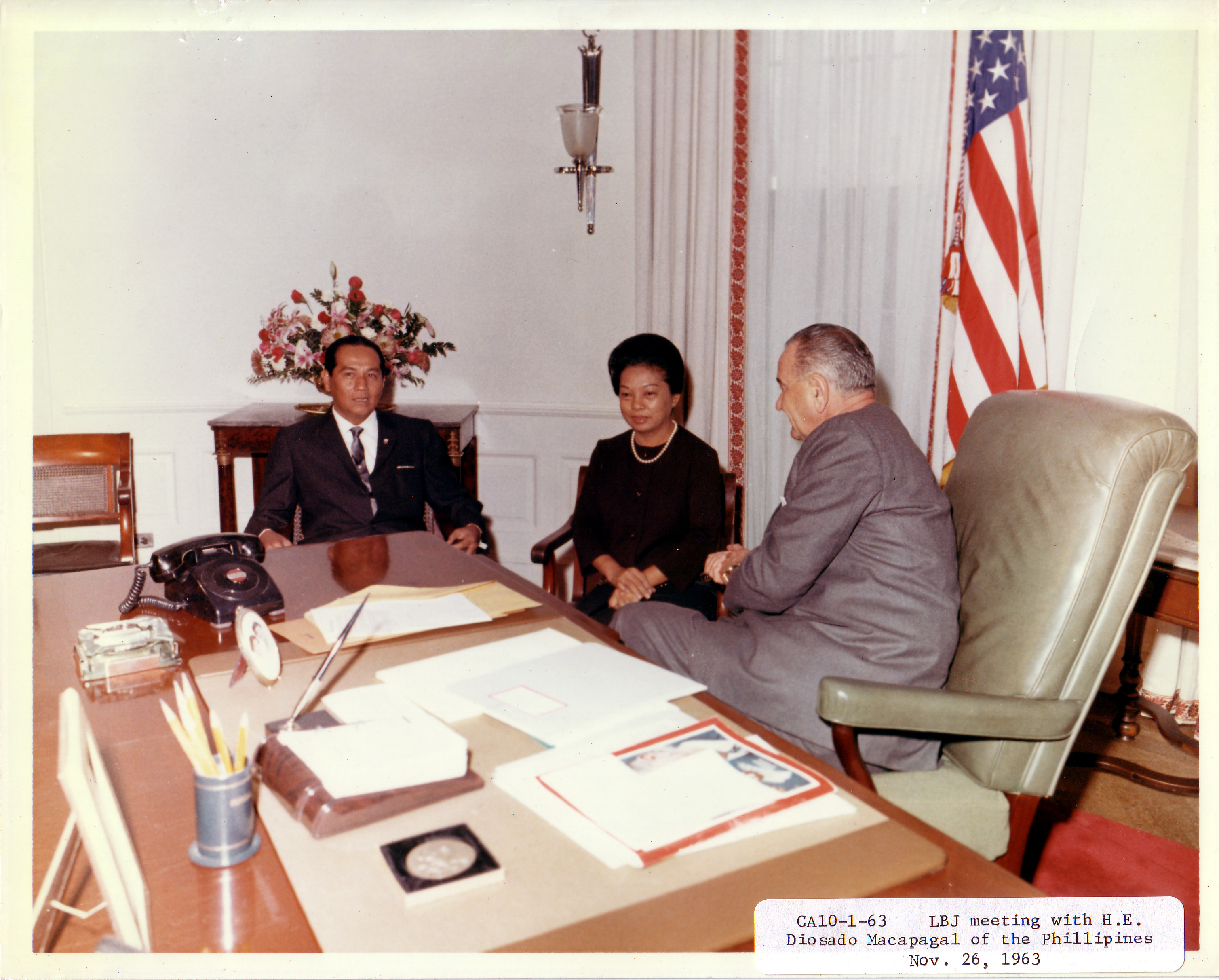
US President Lyndon B. Johnson (right) with Macapagal (left) in 1963

Towards the end of Macapagal's term, Macapagal decided to seek re-election to continue seeking reforms which he claimed were stifled by a "dominant and uncooperative opposition" in Congress. With Senate President Ferdinand Marcos, a fellow member of the Liberal Party, unable to win his party's nomination due to Macapagal's re-election bid, Marcos switched allegiance to the rival Nacionalista Party to oppose Macapagal. Among the issues raised against the incumbent administration were graft and corruption, rise in consumer goods, and persisting peace and order issues.

He chose Senator Gerry Roxas, son of former President Manuel Roxas, as his runningmate after Vice President Emmanuel Pelaez ran as an Independent for a Congressional seat in Misamis Oriental who left the Leaving The Liberal party during the height of the Stonehill scandal where Justice Secretary Salvador Mariño falsely implicated Pelaez in an exposé on the Stonehill scandal broadcast on both radio and television,

On January 15, 1964, Pelaez rejoined the Nacionalista Party but lost the nomination on November 22, 1964, for President of the Philippines to Senator Marcos.

=== Rise of Ferdinand Marcos ===
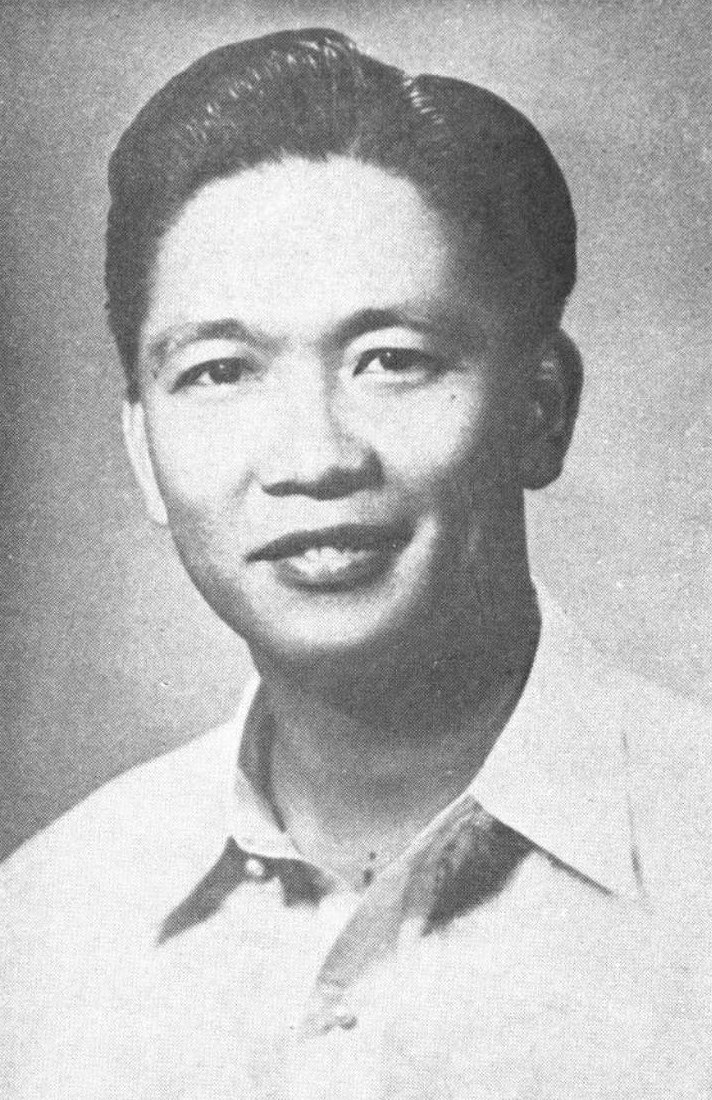
Ferdinand Marcos Official Portrait as Senate President

Ferdinand Marcos always had the ambition to be the president of the Philippines. In his campaign for the 1949 elections, he declared that if he would be elected as congressman, he promise to have an Ilocano president in 20 years' time. Marcos slowly ascended into power and then attempted to run as president in 1961, but he lost to Macapagal in the nominations.

At the time of the 1965 elections, Marcos was a member of the Liberal Party (LP), becoming Senate President during Macapagal's term. Marcos found his ambitions to run for president blocked for a second time when Macapagal decided to run for a second term, so Marcos jumped from the LP to the Nacionalista Party (NP), eventually becoming the NP's candidate for president, winning against Vice President Emmanuel Pelaez in the NP nominations for the presidency.

He acknowledged Himself as a "master of populist imagery", Marcos projected a persona of youth and virility, having himself photographed by rice farmers in their fields.

== Results ==
=== President ===
Candidate	Party	Votes	%
Ferdinand Marcos	Nacionalista Party	3,861,324	51.94
Diosdado Macapagal (incumbent)	Liberal Party	3,187,752	42.88
Raul Manglapus	Party for Philippine Progress	384,564	5.17
Gaudencio Bueno	New Leaf Party	199	0.00
Aniceto A. Hidalgo	New Leaf Party	156	0.00
Segundo Baldovi	Partido ng Bansa	139	0.00
Nic V. Garces	People’s Progressive Democratic Party	130	0.00
German F. Villanueva	Independent	106	0.00
Guillermo M. Mercado	Laborer Party	27	0.00
Antonio Nicolas Jr.	Allied Party	27	0.00
Blandino P. Ruan	Independent	6	0.00
Praxedes Floro	Independent	1	0.00
Total		7,434,431	100.00
Valid votes		7,434,431	97.69
Invalid/blank votes		175,620	2.31
Total votes		7,610,051	100.00
Registered voters/turnout		9,962,345	76.39
Source: Nohlen, Grotz, Hartmann, Hasall and Santos

Popular vote
Marcos	51.94%
Macapagal	42.88%
Manglapus	5.17%
Others	0.01%

==== Results by province and city ====
Province/City	Marcos		Macapagal		Manglapus		Bueno		Hidalgo		Baldovi		Garces		Villanueva		Mercado		Nicolas		Ruan		Floro	
Province/City	Votes	%	Votes	%	Votes	%	Votes	%	Votes	%	Votes	%	Votes	%	Votes	%	Votes	%	Votes	%	Votes	%	Votes	%
Abra	21,129	58.72	14,418	40.07	431	1.20	0	0.00	0	0.00	1	0.00	0	0.00	0	0.00	0	0.00	1	0.00	0	0.00		
Agusan	29,968	45.04	35,537	53.41	1,025	1.54	2	0.00	1	0.00	0	0.00	0	0.00	0	0.00	0	0.00	0	0.00	0	0.00		
Aklan	33,438	50.34	31,974	48.14	1,012	1.52	0	0.00	0	0.00	0	0.00	0	0.00	0	0.00	0	0.00	0	0.00	0	0.00		
Angeles City	4,041	25.06	11,760	72.94	322	2.00	0	0.00	0	0.00	0	0.00	0	0.00	0	0.00	0	0.00	0	0.00	0	0.00		
Albay	61,965	53.18	47,930	41.14	6,620	5.68	0	0.00	0	0.00	0	0.00	0	0.00	0	0.00	0	0.00	0	0.00	0	0.00		
Antique	29,690	51.71	22,793	39.70	4,930	8.59	0	0.00	0	0.00	1	0.00	1	0.00	0	0.00	2	0.00	0	0.00	0	0.00		
Bacolod	17,904	45.93	15,587	39.99	5,483	14.07	0	0.00	0	0.00	0	0.00	6	0.02	0	0.00	1	0.00	0	0.00	0	0.00		
Baguio	10,902	61.90	4,928	27.98	1,782	10.12	0	0.00	0	0.00	0	0.00	0	0.00	0	0.00	0	0.00	0	0.00	0	0.00		
Basilan	7,226	54.77	4,930	37.37	1,037	7.86	0	0.00	0	0.00	0	0.00	0	0.00	0	0.00	0	0.00	0	0.00	0	0.00		
Bataan	30,260	53.34	24,006	42.32	2,455	4.33	0	0.00	8	0.01	1	0.00	0	0.00	0	0.00	0	0.00	0	0.00	0	0.00		
Batanes	1,367	34.54	2,575	65.06	16	0.40	0	0.00	0	0.00	0	0.00	0	0.00	0	0.00	0	0.00	0	0.00	0	0.00		
Batangas	125,467	61.45	67,236	32.93	11,463	5.61	0	0.00	4	0.00	2	0.00	18	0.01	1	0.00	1	0.00	0	0.00	0	0.00		
Bohol	108,065	65.02	56,016	33.70	2,129	1.28	0	0.00	0	0.00	0	0.00	0	0.00	0	0.00	0	0.00	0	0.00	0	0.00		
Bukidnon	19,770	41.76	21,827	46.10	5,743	12.13	0	0.00	1	0.00	1	0.00	0	0.00	0	0.00	0	0.00	0	0.00	0	0.00		
Bulacan	122,142	55.27	88,426	40.01	10,388	4.70	10	0.00	4	0.00	10	0.00	0	0.00	0	0.00	9	0.00	2	0.00	0	0.00		
Butuan	18,297	47.82	18,861	49.30	1,098	2.87	1	0.00	1	0.00	0	0.00	2	0.01	0	0.00	0	0.00	0	0.00	0	0.00		
Cabanatuan	13,494	60.86	7,762	35.01	905	4.08	0	0.00	0	0.00	10	0.05	0	0.00	0	0.00	0	0.00	0	0.00	0	0.00		
Cagayan	86,718	76.72	22,373	19.79	3,939	3.48	0	0.00	1	0.00	0	0.00	1	0.00	1	0.00	0	0.00	0	0.00	0	0.00		
Cagayan de Oro	4,764	23.93	9,696	48.69	5,452	27.38	0	0.00	0	0.00	0	0.00	0	0.00	0	0.00	0	0.00	0	0.00	0	0.00		
Calbayog	9,102	52.02	8,303	47.46	91	0.52	0	0.00	0	0.00	0	0.00	0	0.00	0	0.00	0	0.00	0	0.00	0	0.00		
Caloocan	24,610	55.81	15,590	35.35	3,895	8.83	0	0.00	0	0.00	0	0.00	0	0.00	1	0.00	0	0.00	2	0.00	0	0.00		
Camarines Norte	24,122	45.89	24,069	45.79	4,368	8.31	0	0.00	0	0.00	1	0.00	0	0.00	1	0.00	0	0.00	0	0.00	0	0.00		
Camarines Sur	86,753	54.26	66,581	41.64	6,544	4.09	0	0.00	0	0.00	0	0.00	0	0.00	0	0.00	0	0.00	0	0.00	0	0.00		
Canlaon	1,362	55.98	1,049	43.12	22	0.90	0	0.00	0	0.00	0	0.00	0	0.00	0	0.00	0	0.00	0	0.00	0	0.00		
Capiz	35,829	49.94	34,304	47.81	1,602	2.23	1	0.00	0	0.00	0	0.00	7	0.01	0	0.00	1	0.00	1	0.00	0	0.00		
Catanduanes	12,403	32.44	24,967	65.30	862	2.25	0	0.00	0	0.00	0	0.00	0	0.00	0	0.00	0	0.00	0	0.00	0	0.00		
Cavite	40,693	37.28	65,686	60.18	2,748	2.52	0	0.00	13	0.01	0	0.00	1	0.00	0	0.00	0	0.00	0	0.00	0	0.00		
Cavite City	7,687	50.70	5,494	36.23	1,982	13.07	0	0.00	0	0.00	0	0.00	0	0.00	0	0.00	0	0.00	0	0.00	0	0.00		
Cebu	103,641	41.49	138,288	55.36	7,848	3.14	1	0.00	4	0.00	7	0.00	1	0.00	0	0.00	4	0.00	1	0.00	0	0.00		
Cebu City	28,452	40.74	34,565	49.50	6,815	9.76	0	0.00	1	0.00	0	0.00	0	0.00	0	0.00	0	0.00	0	0.00	0	0.00		
Cotabato	81,119	34.97	142,099	61.26	8,628	3.72	102	0.04	1	0.00	22	0.01	1	0.00	1	0.00	1	0.00	0	0.00	0	0.00		
Cotabato City	3,948	45.14	3,951	45.17	848	9.69	0	0.00	0	0.00	0	0.00	0	0.00	0	0.00	0	0.00	0	0.00	0	0.00		
Dagupan	11,990	54.75	9,213	42.07	698	3.19	0	0.00	0	0.00	0	0.00	0	0.00	0	0.00	0	0.00	0	0.00	0	0.00		
Danao	11,252	88.74	1,329	10.48	99	0.78	0	0.00	0	0.00	0	0.00	0	0.00	0	0.00	0	0.00	0	0.00	0	0.00		
Dapitan	4,679	52.25	3,843	42.91	433	4.84	0	0.00	0	0.00	0	0.00	0	0.00	0	0.00	0	0.00	0	0.00	0	0.00		
Davao	74,143	54.04	59,067	43.05	3,999	2.91	0	0.00	0	0.00	0	0.00	0	0.00	0	0.00	0	0.00	0	0.00	0	0.00		
Davao City	34,337	50.37	29,339	43.04	4,485	6.58	0	0.00	1	0.00	1	0.00	1	0.00	0	0.00	0	0.00	0	0.00	0	0.00		
Dumaguete	6,042	51.97	4,484	38.57	1,100	9.46	0	0.00	0	0.00	0	0.00	0	0.00	0	0.00	1	0.01	0	0.00	0	0.00		
Gingoog	3,047	31.46	4,511	46.57	2,128	21.97	0	0.00	0	0.00	0	0.00	0	0.00	0	0.00	0	0.00	0	0.00	0	0.00		
Iligan	8,054	48.22	7,516	45.00	1,130	6.77	0	0.00	2	0.01	0	0.00	0	0.00	0	0.00	0	0.00	0	0.00	0	0.00		
Ilocos Norte	88,837	96.46	2,988	3.24	263	0.29	0	0.00	0	0.00	8	0.01	1	0.00	0	0.00	0	0.00	0	0.00	0	0.00		
Ilocos Sur	99,147	89.50	10,179	9.19	1,451	1.31	0	0.00	0	0.00	0	0.00	0	0.00	0	0.00	0	0.00	0	0.00	0	0.00		
Iloilo	113,553	48.99	104,667	45.16	13,563	5.85	0	0.00	0	0.00	0	0.00	2	0.00	0	0.00	0	0.00	1	0.00	0	0.00		
Iloilo City	26,404	49.56	22,969	43.12	3,871	7.27	28	0.05	0	0.00	0	0.00	0	0.00	0	0.00	0	0.00	0	0.00	0	0.00		
Isabela	82,186	81.41	17,294	17.13	1,468	1.45	0	0.00	0	0.00	0	0.00	0	0.00	0	0.00	0	0.00	1	0.00	0	0.00		
La Union	74,910	83.97	13,409	15.03	896	1.00	0	0.00	0	0.00	0	0.00	0	0.00	0	0.00	0	0.00	0	0.00	0	0.00		
Laguna	82,648	57.65	49,088	34.24	11,613	8.10	2	0.00	10	0.01	0	0.00	0	0.00	0	0.00	1	0.00	0	0.00	0	0.00		
Lanao del Norte	18,179	32.28	37,367	66.35	774	1.37	0	0.00	0	0.00	1	0.00	0	0.00	0	0.00	0	0.00	0	0.00	0	0.00		
Lanao del Sur	25,918	21.60	93,847	78.20	241	0.20	0	0.00	0	0.00	0	0.00	1	0.00	0	0.00	2	0.00	0	0.00	0	0.00		
Lapu-Lapu City	4,595	42.80	5,604	52.20	537	5.00	0	0.00	0	0.00	0	0.00	0	0.00	0	0.00	0	0.00	0	0.00	0	0.00		
Legazpi	9,567	53.70	7,129	40.01	1,121	6.29	0	0.00	0	0.00	0	0.00	0	0.00	0	0.00	0	0.00	0	0.00	0	0.00		
Leyte	108,781	53.78	91,512	45.25	1,960	0.97	0	0.00	1	0.00	1	0.00	0	0.00	0	0.00	0	0.00	0	0.00	0	0.00		
Lipa	10,854	50.82	8,968	41.99	1,537	7.20	0	0.00	0	0.00	0	0.00	0	0.00	0	0.00	0	0.00	0	0.00	0	0.00		
Lucena	5,486	36.60	7,517	50.15	1,987	13.26	0	0.00	0	0.00	0	0.00	0	0.00	0	0.00	0	0.00	0	0.00	0	0.00		
Manila	179,314	53.07	114,093	33.77	44,306	13.11	35	0.01	86	0.03	3	0.00	43	0.01	1	0.00	0	0.00	7	0.00	2	0.00		
Marawi	6,187	49.85	6,069	48.90	155	1.25	0	0.00	0	0.00	0	0.00	0	0.00	0	0.00	0	0.00	0	0.00	0	0.00		
Marinduque	15,015	44.86	14,627	43.70	3,828	11.44	0	0.00	0	0.00	0	0.00	0	0.00	0	0.00	0	0.00	0	0.00	0	0.00		
Masbate	39,096	53.77	31,332	43.09	2,276	3.13	0	0.00	0	0.00	1	0.00	2	0.00	4	0.01	0	0.00	1	0.00	0	0.00		
Misamis Occidental	31,528	54.59	22,848	39.56	3,372	5.84	0	0.00	0	0.00	0	0.00	0	0.00	1	0.00	0	0.00	0	0.00	0	0.00		
Misamis Oriental	14,112	22.50	29,394	46.87	19,199	30.62	1	0.00	1	0.00	0	0.00	3	0.00	0	0.00	1	0.00	0	0.00	0	0.00		
Mountain Province	41,030	55.11	22,822	30.65	10,592	14.23	0	0.00	1	0.00	0	0.00	1	0.00	2	0.00	0	0.00	1	0.00	3	0.00		
Naga	6,410	43.81	6,285	42.95	1,937	13.24	0	0.00	0	0.00	0	0.00	0	0.00	1	0.01	0	0.00	0	0.00	0	0.00		
Negros Occidental	102,690	47.73	101,663	47.26	10,698	4.97	0	0.00	1	0.00	0	0.00	2	0.00	76	0.04	0	0.00	0	0.00	0	0.00		
Negros Oriental	54,966	51.75	48,938	46.08	2,301	2.17	0	0.00	0	0.00	0	0.00	3	0.00	0	0.00	1	0.00	0	0.00	0	0.00		
Nueva Ecija	96,328	56.41	71,806	42.05	2,573	1.51	0	0.00	0	0.00	59	0.03	0	0.00	0	0.00	0	0.00	0	0.00	0	0.00		
Nueva Vizcaya	23,792	64.95	11,861	32.38	979	2.67	0	0.00	0	0.00	1	0.00	0	0.00	0	0.00	0	0.00	0	0.00	0	0.00		
Occidental Mindoro	16,606	56.23	12,614	42.71	311	1.05	0	0.00	0	0.00	0	0.00	0	0.00	0	0.00	0	0.00	0	0.00	0	0.00		
Oriental Mindoro	34,884	55.30	24,197	38.36	3,997	6.34	0	0.00	0	0.00	0	0.00	1	0.00	0	0.00	0	0.00	0	0.00	0	0.00		
Ormoc	7,048	43.46	8,675	53.49	494	3.05	0	0.00	0	0.00	0	0.00	0	0.00	0	0.00	0	0.00	0	0.00	0	0.00		
Ozamiz	7,387	47.88	5,486	35.56	2,554	16.56	0	0.00	0	0.00	0	0.00	0	0.00	0	0.00	0	0.00	0	0.00	0	0.00		
Palawan	21,215	52.41	18,553	45.83	710	1.75	0	0.00	2	0.00	0	0.00	1	0.00	0	0.00	0	0.00	0	0.00	0	0.00		
Pampanga	23,995	15.11	133,693	84.16	1,158	0.73	0	0.00	0	0.00	0	0.00	1	0.00	0	0.00	0	0.00	1	0.00	0	0.00		
Pangasinan	193,937	59.02	130,963	39.86	3,683	1.12	1	0.00	8	0.00	0	0.00	1	0.00	0	0.00	1	0.00	0	0.00	1	0.00		
Pasay	23,417	53.79	14,725	33.83	5,388	12.38	0	0.00	0	0.00	0	0.00	0	0.00	0	0.00	0	0.00	2	0.00	0	0.00		
Quezon	89,216	50.19	73,738	41.48	14,802	8.33	10	0.01	0	0.00	2	0.00	0	0.00	1	0.00	0	0.00	1	0.00	0	0.00		
Quezon City	57,717	57.15	28,221	27.94	15,045	14.90	5	0.00	1	0.00	0	0.00	0	0.00	0	0.00	0	0.00	0	0.00	0	0.00		
Rizal	159,370	53.29	103,207	34.51	36,488	12.20	0	0.00	0	0.00	3	0.00	13	0.00	0	0.00	0	0.00	2	0.00	0	0.00		
Romblon	18,719	48.69	19,465	50.63	262	0.68	0	0.00	0	0.00	0	0.00	0	0.00	0	0.00	0	0.00	1	0.00	0	0.00		
Roxas City	6,426	38.52	9,768	58.56	487	2.92	0	0.00	0	0.00	0	0.00	0	0.00	0	0.00	0	0.00	0	0.00	0	0.00		
Samar	84,143	47.92	89,628	51.04	1,816	1.03	0	0.00	0	0.00	0	0.00	0	0.00	1	0.00	0	0.00	0	0.00	0	0.00		
San Carlos	6,858	50.12	6,597	48.22	225	1.64	0	0.00	0	0.00	0	0.00	2	0.01	0	0.00	0	0.00	0	0.00	0	0.00		
San Pablo	13,242	50.26	10,791	40.95	2,314	8.78	0	0.00	0	0.00	1	0.00	1	0.00	0	0.00	0	0.00	0	0.00	0	0.00		
Silay	4,851	30.72	9,952	63.02	988	6.26	0	0.00	0	0.00	0	0.00	0	0.00	0	0.00	0	0.00	0	0.00	0	0.00		
Sorsogon	46,299	46.05	51,455	51.18	2,781	2.77	0	0.00	0	0.00	0	0.00	1	0.00	0	0.00	0	0.00	0	0.00	0	0.00		
Southern Leyte	33,657	58.43	23,083	40.08	859	1.49	0	0.00	0	0.00	0	0.00	0	0.00	0	0.00	0	0.00	0	0.00	0	0.00		
Sulu	24,971	39.14	35,972	56.39	2,841	4.45	0	0.00	0	0.00	0	0.00	5	0.01	2	0.00	0	0.00	1	0.00	0	0.00		
Surigao del Norte	22,327	38.05	35,521	60.54	826	1.41	0	0.00	0	0.00	0	0.00	0	0.00	0	0.00	0	0.00	0	0.00	0	0.00		
Surigao del Sur	26,549	54.31	20,940	42.83	1,398	2.86	0	0.00	0	0.00	0	0.00	0	0.00	0	0.00	0	0.00	0	0.00	0	0.00		
Tacloban	10,481	57.49	7,360	40.37	389	2.13	0	0.00	0	0.00	0	0.00	0	0.00	0	0.00	0	0.00	0	0.00	0	0.00		
Tagaytay	138	2.53	5,274	96.77	38	0.70	0	0.00	0	0.00	0	0.00	0	0.00	0	0.00	0	0.00	0	0.00	0	0.00		
Tarlac	60,969	46.46	68,240	52.00	2,018	1.54	0	0.00	0	0.00	2	0.00	1	0.00	0	0.00	0	0.00	0	0.00	0	0.00		
Toledo	6,922	53.32	5,411	41.68	650	5.01	0	0.00	0	0.00	0	0.00	0	0.00	0	0.00	0	0.00	0	0.00	0	0.00		
Trece Martires	103	6.90	1,390	93.10	0	0.00	0	0.00	0	0.00	0	0.00	0	0.00	0	0.00	0	0.00	0	0.00	0	0.00		
Zambales	52,042	74.91	13,449	19.36	3,962	5.70	0	0.00	3	0.00	0	0.00	0	0.00	12	0.02	0	0.00	1	0.00	0	0.00		
Zamboanga City	12,797	45.92	11,731	42.10	3,337	11.97	0	0.00	0	0.00	0	0.00	1	0.00	0	0.00	1	0.00	0	0.00	0	0.00		
Zamboanga del Norte	30,276	56.19	20,563	38.16	3,038	5.64	0	0.00	0	0.00	0	0.00	5	0.01	0	0.00	0	0.00	0	0.00	0	0.00		
Zamboanga del Sur	43,357	51.04	39,931	47.01	1,652	1.94	0	0.00	0	0.00	0	0.00	0	0.00	0	0.00	0	0.00	0	0.00	0	0.00		
Total	3,861,324	51.94	3,187,752	42.88	384,564	5.17	199	0.00	156	0.00	139	0.00	130	0.00	106	0.00	27	0.00	27	0.00	6	0.00	1	0.00
Source: Commission on Elections

=== Vice-President ===
Candidate	Party	Votes	%
Fernando Lopez	Nacionalista Party	3,531,550	48.48
Gerry Roxas	Liberal Party	3,504,826	48.11
Manuel Manahan	Party for Philippine Progress	247,426	3.40
Gonzalo D. Vasquez	Reformist Party of the Philippines	644	0.01
Severo Capales	New Leaf Party	193	0.00
Eleodoro Salvador	Partido ng Bansa	172	0.00
Total		7,284,811	100.00
Valid votes		7,284,811	95.73
Invalid/blank votes		325,240	4.27
Total votes		7,610,051	100.00
Registered voters/turnout		9,962,345	76.39
Source: Nohlen, Grotz, Hartmann, Hasall and Santos

Popular vote
Lopez	48.48%
Roxas	48.11%
Manahan	3.40%
Others	0.01%

==== Results by province and city ====
Province/City	Lopez		Roxas		Manahan		Vasquez		Capales		Salvador	
Province/City	Votes	%	Votes	%	Votes	%	Votes	%	Votes	%	Votes	%
Abra	18,331	52.59	16,095	46.18	429	1.23	1	0.00	0	0.00	0	0.00
Agusan	27,358	41.98	37,149	57.00	660	1.01	0	0.00	2	0.00	1	0.00
Aklan	31,218	47.53	34,078	51.88	390	0.59	0	0.00	0	0.00	0	0.00
Angeles City	4,261	26.84	11,234	70.77	376	2.37	3	0.02	1	0.01	0	0.00
Albay	58,760	52.42	49,721	44.35	3,617	3.23	7	0.01	0	0.00	0	0.00
Antique	30,131	53.10	24,873	43.84	1,730	3.05	3	0.01	1	0.00	4	0.01
Bacolod	20,235	52.13	16,499	42.51	2,078	5.35	1	0.00	0	0.00	0	0.00
Baguio	8,586	48.84	7,630	43.40	1,363	7.75	0	0.00	0	0.00	0	0.00
Basilan	6,440	50.33	5,826	45.53	528	4.13	0	0.00	0	0.00	1	0.01
Bataan	27,735	50.26	25,843	46.83	1,588	2.88	1	0.00	15	0.03	0	0.00
Batanes	1,336	34.57	2,497	64.61	29	0.75	0	0.00	0	0.00	3	0.08
Batangas	119,599	61.11	70,112	35.82	5,993	3.06	14	0.01	6	0.00	3	0.00
Bohol	99,011	60.46	63,720	38.91	1,039	0.63	2	0.00	1	0.00	0	0.00
Bukidnon	18,564	40.26	23,492	50.94	4,056	8.80	0	0.00	4	0.01	0	0.00
Bulacan	109,670	50.41	101,284	46.56	6,591	3.03	3	0.00	7	0.00	1	0.00
Butuan	16,810	44.51	20,347	53.87	562	1.49	50	0.13	0	0.00	0	0.00
Cabanatuan	11,851	54.16	9,455	43.21	567	2.59	0	0.00	0	0.00	9	0.04
Cagayan	78,187	70.54	29,756	26.84	2,894	2.61	1	0.00	1	0.00	7	0.01
Cagayan de Oro	4,526	23.44	11,009	57.01	3,768	19.51	0	0.00	7	0.04	0	0.00
Calbayog	8,439	49.01	8,744	50.78	35	0.20	0	0.00	0	0.00	0	0.00
Caloocan	19,518	44.52	21,731	49.56	2,591	5.91	2	0.00	1	0.00	1	0.00
Camarines Norte	22,388	43.38	27,262	52.83	1,952	3.78	2	0.00	1	0.00	1	0.00
Camarines Sur	77,221	49.27	75,871	48.41	3,634	2.32	9	0.01	0	0.00	0	0.00
Canlaon	1,150	34.19	1,204	35.79	1,010	30.02	0	0.00	0	0.00	0	0.00
Capiz	30,552	42.92	40,068	56.28	571	0.80	0	0.00	0	0.00	0	0.00
Catanduanes	12,066	32.36	24,542	65.82	678	1.82	1	0.00	0	0.00	0	0.00
Cavite	40,974	38.24	64,290	60.00	1,880	1.75	7	0.01	0	0.00	0	0.00
Cavite City	6,508	43.46	6,839	45.67	1,627	10.86	1	0.01	0	0.00	0	0.00
Cebu	95,403	39.63	140,245	58.25	5,048	2.10	55	0.02	3	0.00	5	0.00
Cebu City	23,211	33.68	41,562	60.31	4,127	5.99	8	0.01	0	0.00	1	0.00
Cotabato	74,278	32.94	145,167	64.37	6,028	2.67	19	0.01	2	0.00	30	0.01
Cotabato City	3,302	38.53	4,748	55.41	519	6.06	0	0.00	0	0.00	0	0.00
Dagupan	10,229	47.05	11,041	50.78	469	2.16	3	0.01	0	0.00	0	0.00
Danao	10,993	87.91	1,464	11.71	47	0.38	1	0.01	0	0.00	0	0.00
Dapitan	4,260	48.62	4,281	48.86	220	2.51	0	0.00	0	0.00	0	0.00
Davao	71,390	52.98	60,355	44.79	2,990	2.22	5	0.00	0	0.00	0	0.00
Davao City	33,709	49.97	31,067	46.05	2,681	3.97	4	0.01	1	0.00	0	0.00
Dumaguete	5,394	46.86	5,669	49.25	445	3.87	2	0.02	0	0.00	0	0.00
Gingoog	3,398	36.95	4,136	44.98	1,661	18.06	0	0.00	0	0.00	1	0.01
Iligan	7,333	44.86	8,369	51.20	643	3.93	0	0.00	0	0.00	0	0.00
Ilocos Norte	84,612	92.25	6,639	7.24	454	0.49	1	0.00	0	0.00	12	0.01
Ilocos Sur	86,388	78.80	20,536	18.73	2,710	2.47	0	0.00	0	0.00	0	0.00
Iloilo	135,547	59.02	90,928	39.59	3,181	1.39	1	0.00	0	0.00	0	0.00
Iloilo City	31,239	58.73	20,648	38.82	1,302	2.45	1	0.00	0	0.00	0	0.00
Isabela	66,515	66.53	32,242	32.25	1,219	1.22	1	0.00	0	0.00	7	0.01
La Union	65,183	73.35	19,429	21.86	4,246	4.78	3	0.00	1	0.00	0	0.00
Laguna	72,159	52.11	58,427	42.19	7,884	5.69	4	0.00	4	0.00	1	0.00
Lanao del Norte	14,801	27.13	39,174	71.81	572	1.05	2	0.00	0	0.00	0	0.00
Lanao del Sur	18,651	17.21	87,487	80.70	2,144	1.98	120	0.11	2	0.00	0	0.00
Lapu-Lapu City	3,978	38.25	6,047	58.15	373	3.59	1	0.01	0	0.00	0	0.00
Legazpi	9,288	52.65	7,796	44.19	557	3.16	1	0.01	0	0.00	0	0.00
Leyte	100,661	50.72	96,715	48.73	1,090	0.55	1	0.00	1	0.00	0	0.00
Lipa	10,630	52.29	8,744	43.01	954	4.69	0	0.00	0	0.00	0	0.00
Lucena	4,442	30.03	9,092	61.47	1,256	8.49	1	0.01	0	0.00	0	0.00
Manila	150,882	44.89	157,677	46.91	27,453	8.17	41	0.01	50	0.01	6	0.00
Marawi	4,661	42.50	5,610	51.15	671	6.12	25	0.23	0	0.00	0	0.00
Marinduque	12,665	38.74	16,679	51.02	3,342	10.22	3	0.01	0	0.00	0	0.00
Masbate	35,797	50.86	32,683	46.43	1,901	2.70	3	0.00	0	0.00	2	0.00
Misamis Occidental	28,291	50.13	26,342	46.68	1,797	3.18	0	0.00	1	0.00	1	0.00
Misamis Oriental	14,332	24.26	31,498	53.33	13,224	22.39	6	0.01	2	0.00	4	0.01
Mountain Province	35,901	48.36	28,006	37.73	10,326	13.91	2	0.00	0	0.00	0	0.00
Naga	5,474	37.78	7,933	54.74	1,083	7.47	1	0.01	0	0.00	0	0.00
Negros Occidental	106,859	50.24	101,577	47.76	4,257	2.00	1	0.00	0	0.00	0	0.00
Negros Oriental	51,785	49.74	51,126	49.11	1,199	1.15	1	0.00	0	0.00	0	0.00
Nueva Ecija	87,677	52.17	77,700	46.23	2,650	1.58	1	0.00	0	0.00	45	0.03
Nueva Vizcaya	19,425	53.47	15,885	43.72	1,018	2.80	1	0.00	0	0.00	1	0.00
Occidental Mindoro	14,426	49.56	14,290	49.09	386	1.33	5	0.02	3	0.01	1	0.00
Oriental Mindoro	30,388	49.07	28,677	46.31	2,859	4.62	6	0.01	0	0.00	0	0.00
Ormoc	6,353	39.62	9,493	59.21	187	1.17	1	0.01	0	0.00	0	0.00
Ozamiz	6,054	40.38	7,557	50.40	1,383	9.22	0	0.00	0	0.00	0	0.00
Palawan	19,190	48.09	20,138	50.46	579	1.45	0	0.00	1	0.00	0	0.00
Pampanga	35,166	22.65	117,962	75.98	2,109	1.36	26	0.02	0	0.00	1	0.00
Pangasinan	171,498	52.59	151,182	46.36	3,414	1.05	2	0.00	5	0.00	1	0.00
Pasay	21,329	49.19	19,063	43.97	2,965	6.84	2	0.00	0	0.00	0	0.00
Quezon	82,131	46.91	84,153	48.07	8,787	5.02	3	0.00	2	0.00	0	0.00
Quezon City	48,036	47.79	42,205	41.99	10,259	10.21	18	0.02	5	0.00	0	0.00
Rizal	135,462	45.87	137,648	46.61	22,152	7.50	43	0.01	18	0.01	2	0.00
Romblon	18,050	47.27	19,845	51.98	286	0.75	0	0.00	0	0.00	0	0.00
Roxas City	5,176	31.01	11,413	68.38	102	0.61	0	0.00	0	0.00	0	0.00
Samar	71,896	42.38	96,697	57.00	1,031	0.61	2	0.00	30	0.02	2	0.00
San Carlos	6,344	47.60	6,885	51.66	97	0.73	2	0.02	0	0.00	0	0.00
San Pablo	11,145	43.31	13,247	51.47	1,343	5.22	0	0.00	0	0.00	0	0.00
Silay	8,416	53.86	6,553	41.93	658	4.21	0	0.00	0	0.00	0	0.00
Sorsogon	42,270	43.13	53,966	55.07	1,760	1.80	1	0.00	1	0.00	1	0.00
Southern Leyte	32,384	57.15	23,695	41.81	581	1.03	7	0.01	1	0.00	0	0.00
Sulu	19,956	34.84	35,101	61.29	2,212	3.86	0	0.00	1	0.00	1	0.00
Surigao del Norte	20,365	35.15	36,987	63.85	510	0.88	67	0.12	1	0.00	0	0.00
Surigao del Sur	23,845	49.67	23,249	48.43	900	1.87	10	0.02	0	0.00	2	0.00
Tacloban	9,238	51.05	8,648	47.79	210	1.16	0	0.00	0	0.00	1	0.01
Tagaytay	147	2.76	5,157	96.92	17	0.32	0	0.00	0	0.00	0	0.00
Tarlac	51,786	40.08	75,293	58.27	2,112	1.63	11	0.01	0	0.00	8	0.01
Toledo	5,057	40.96	6,858	55.54	431	3.49	1	0.01	0	0.00	0	0.00
Trece Martires	127	8.78	1,296	89.56	24	1.66	0	0.00	0	0.00	0	0.00
Zambales	45,205	66.31	20,575	30.18	2,390	3.51	4	0.01	1	0.00	1	0.00
Zamboanga City	11,617	42.88	13,991	51.64	1,484	5.48	1	0.00	0	0.00	0	0.00
Zamboanga del Norte	28,022	53.44	23,227	44.30	1,169	2.23	5	0.01	9	0.02	1	0.00
Zamboanga del Sur	38,333	46.04	43,880	52.70	1,052	1.26	0	0.00	1	0.00	2	0.00
Total	3,531,550	48.48	3,504,826	48.11	247,426	3.40	644	0.01	193	0.00	172	0.00
Source: Commission on Elections

== See also ==
- Commission on Elections
- Politics of the Philippines
- Philippine elections
- President of the Philippines
- 6th Congress of the Philippines
