= Cornelio Villareal =

Filipino lawyer and politician (1904–1992)

The Honorable Cornelio T. Villareal
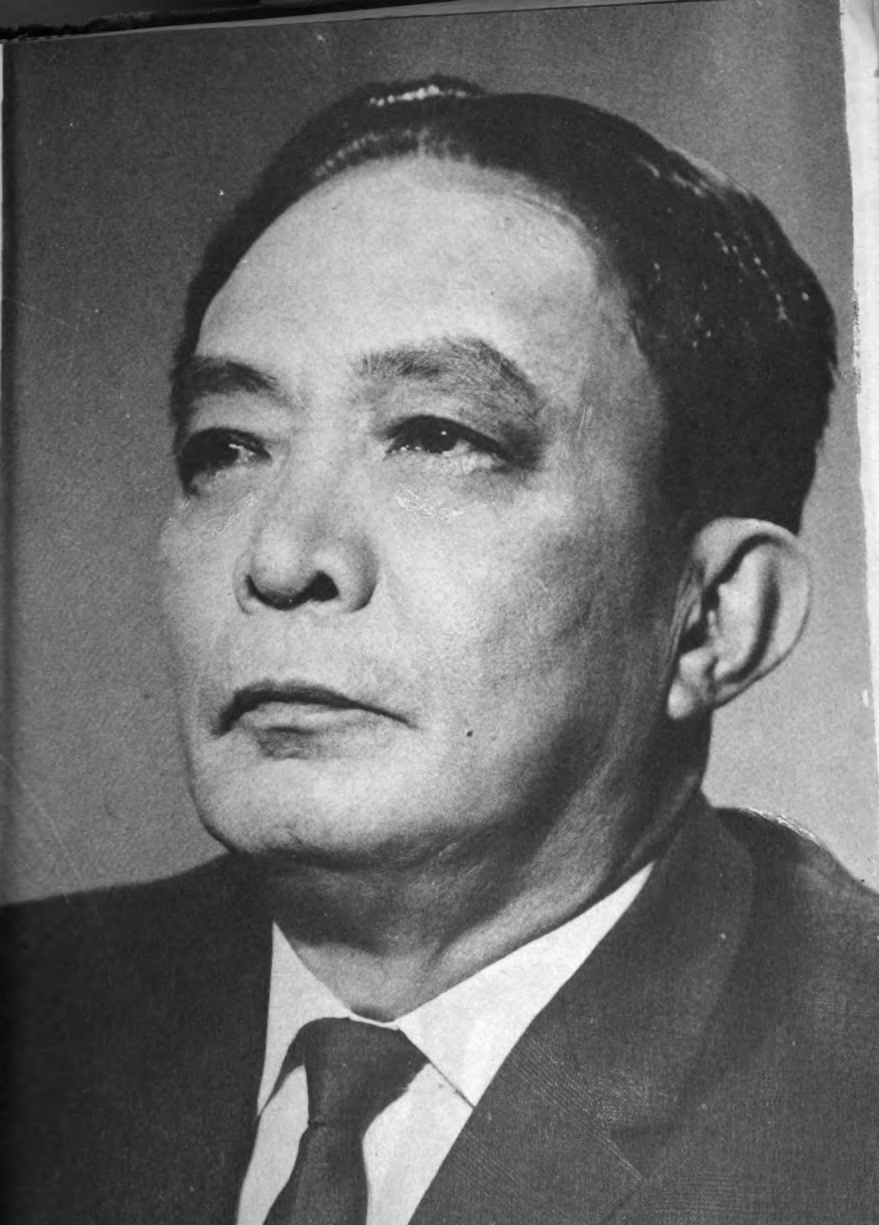
- Official portrait during the 6th Congress

11th and 13th Speaker of the House of Representatives of the Philippines
- In office April 1, 1971 – September 23, 1972
- Preceded by: Jose Laurel Jr.
- Succeeded by: Querube Makalintal (as speaker of the Interim Batasang Pambansa)
- In office March 9, 1962 – February 2, 1967
- Preceded by: Daniel Z. Romualdez
- Succeeded by: Jose Laurel Jr.

House Minority Leader
- In office January 25, 1960 – March 9, 1962
- Preceded by: Ferdinand Marcos
- Succeeded by: Daniel Z. Romualdez

Member of the House of Representatives from Capiz's 2nd district
- In office June 30, 1987 – June 30, 1992
- Preceded by: District re-established
- Succeeded by: Vicente Andaya Jr.
- In office June 11, 1945 – September 23, 1972
- Preceded by: José Dorado
- Succeeded by: District abolished

9th Governor of Capiz
- In office 1942–1945
- Preceded by: Gabriel Hernandez
- Succeeded by: Ludovico Hidrosollo

7th President of the Liberal Party
- In office April 1964 – May 10, 1969
- Preceded by: Ferdinand Marcos
- Succeeded by: Gerardo Roxas

Personal details
- Born: Cornelio Tupaz Villareal; September 11, 1904 Mambusao, Capiz, Philippine Islands
- Died: December 22, 1992 (aged 88) Marikina, Philippines
- Party: Liberal (1946-1992)
- Other political affiliations: Nacionalista (1934-1946)
- Spouse: Angeles Lema
- Education: Silliman University; Philippine Law School (LL.B)
- Occupation: Politician
- Profession: Lawyer

Cornelio Tupaz Villareal Sr. (September 11, 1904 – December 22, 1992) was a Filipino lawyer and politician who served as Speaker of the House of Representatives of the Philippines from 1962 to 1967, and again from 1971 to 1972. Popularly known as Kune, his congressional career representing the Second District of Capiz spanned six decades.

== Early life and education ==
Villareal was born in Mambusao, Capiz. He finished his intermediate and secondary education in Capiz, and enrolled at the Silliman University for his pre-law course. In 1929, he received his law degree from the Philippine Law School. He passed the bar exams on December 7, 1929.

== Political career ==
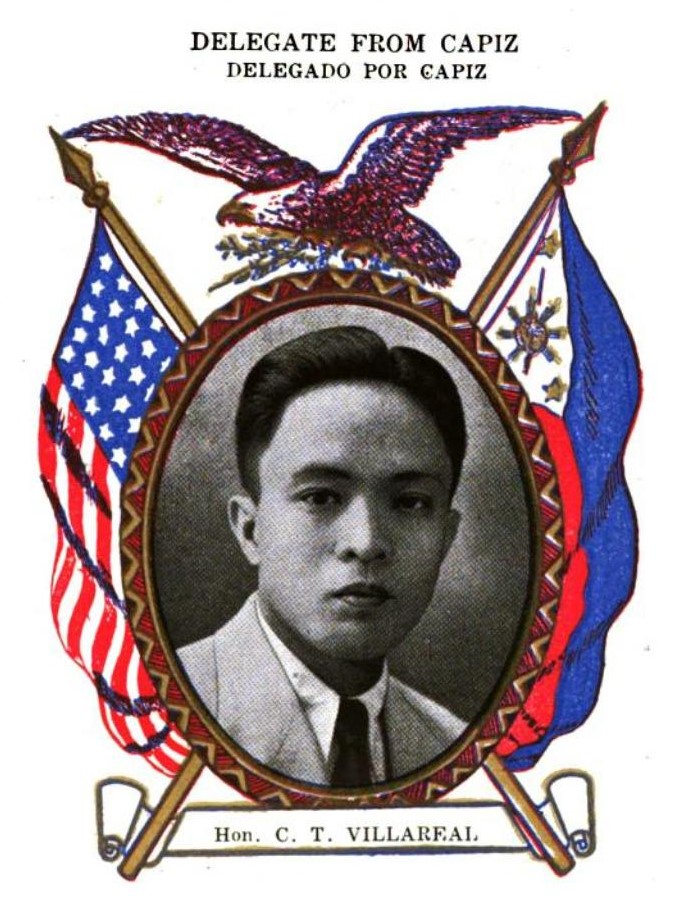
Villareal as a delegate to the Philippine Constitutional Convention, published by Benipayo Press (c. 1935)

Villareal's political career began in 1934, when he was elected as a delegate to the 1935 Constitutional Convention. In 1941, Villareal won his first election as a Member of the House of Representatives, representing the Second District of Capiz. Due to the Japanese invasion in late 1941, he did not assume office until 1945. He was re-elected in 1946 under the banner of the Liberal Party, and served continuously until 1972. In 1951, Villareal unsuccessfully sought election to the Philippine Senate, for the seat vacated by Fernando Lopez upon the latter's election as vice-president.

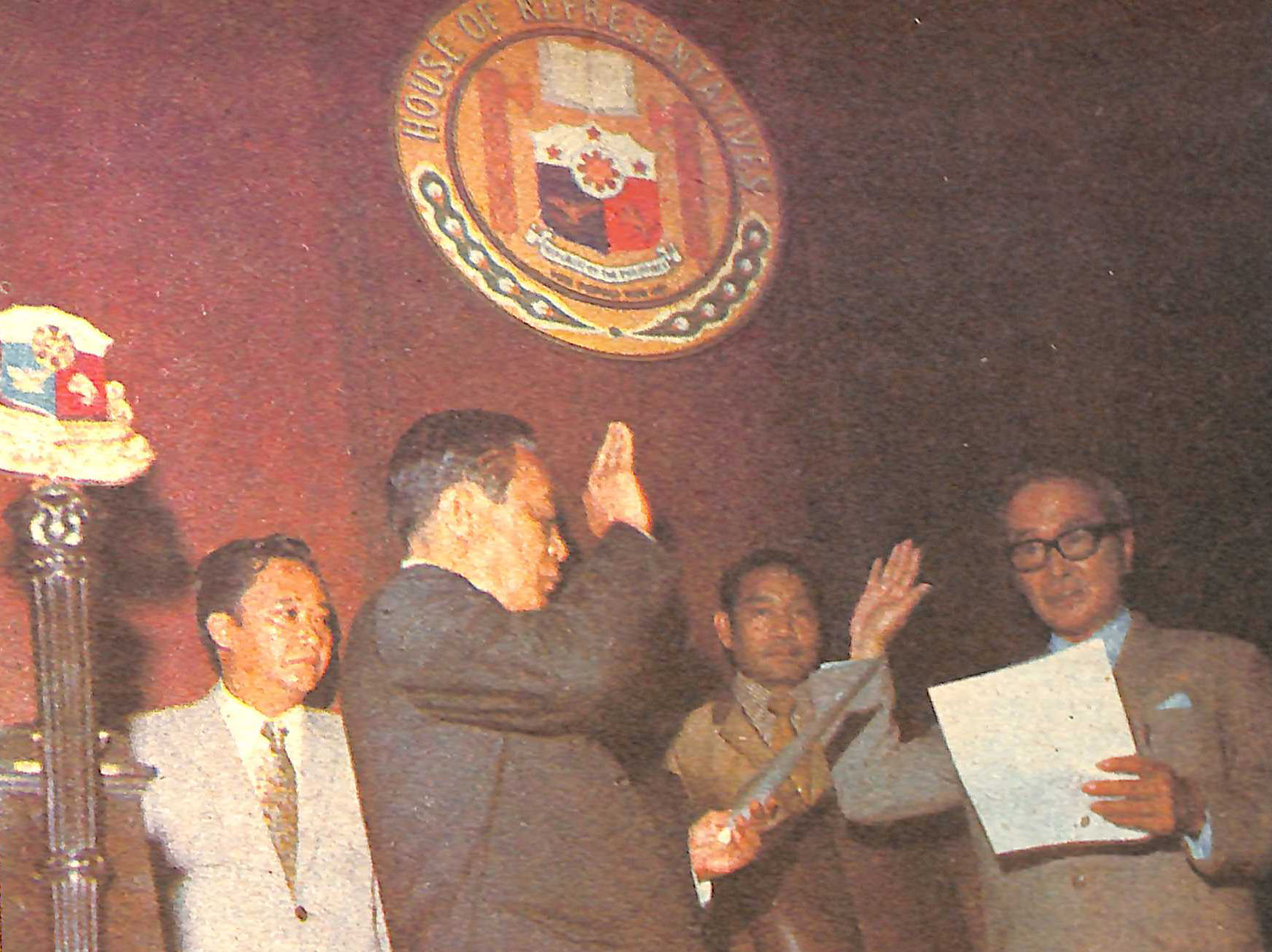
Villareal (left) was re-elected as House Speaker, replacing Jose Laurel Jr. (right) in 1971.

Villareal was first elected Speaker of the House of Representatives during the 5th Congress, in March 1962. During the 6th Congress, he was unseated as speaker in 1967 by Jose Laurel Jr. of the Nacionalista Party. Villareal regained the speakership from Laurel Jr. during the 7th Congress in 1971, and served in that capacity until Congress was abolished upon the declaration of martial law by President Ferdinand Marcos in September 1972.

Villareal withdrew from politics until Congress was restored following the ouster of Marcos. At age 83, he was again elected to his congressional seat in the Second District of Capiz in 1987. He was the oldest member of the 8th Congress, while his colleague from Capiz, Gerardo Roxas Jr., was the youngest member of Congress.

Villareal did not seek re-election following the expiration of his term in June 1992.

== Death ==
Villareal died on December 22, 1992, almost six months after stepping down from Congress, aged 88.

During his congressional career, Villareal advocated liberal economic and trade policies such as decontrol and decentralization.

== Bibliography ==
- Corazon L. Paras; La Vina, Dean Karlo B. (1996). The Speakers of the Philippine Legislative Branch. House of Representatives of the Philippines. ISBN 971-92100-0-1.

House of Representatives of the Philippines
Preceded by Jose A. Dorado	Member of the House of Representatives from Capiz's 2nd district 1945–1972	Seat abolished
Preceded by Daniel Romualdez	Speaker of the House of Representatives; 1962–1967	Succeeded by Jose Laurel Jr.
Preceded by Jose Laurel Jr.	Speaker of the House of Representatives; 1971–1972	Succeeded by Querube Makalintal
Recreated Title last held by Himself	Member of the House of Representatives from Capiz's 2nd district 1987–1992	Succeeded by Vicente Andaya Jr.
Political offices
Preceded by Gabriel Hernandez	Governor of Capiz; 1942–1945	Succeeded by Ludovico Hidrosollo
Party political offices
Preceded by Ferdinand Marcos	President of the Liberal Party; 1964–1969	Succeeded by Gerardo Roxas
