= Legislative districts of Aklan =

Legislative district of the Philippines

The legislative districts of Aklan are the representations of the province of Aklan in the various national legislatures of the Philippines. The province is currently represented in the lower house of the Congress of the Philippines through its first and second congressional districts.

== History ==
Prior to gaining separate representation, areas now under the jurisdiction of Aklan were represented under the at-large district of the province of Capiz in the Malolos Congress from 1898 to 1899. These were later represented under the 2nd and 3rd districts of Capiz from 1907 to 1941. In the disruption caused by the World War II, these were represented as part of the at-large district of Capiz in the National Assembly of the Second Philippine Republic from 1943 to 1944; the pre-war districts were restored in 1945.

Republic Act No. 1414, enacted on April 25, 1956, created the province of Aklan from the western, Aklanon-speaking municipalities of Capiz. The new province began to elect a separate representative under its lone district starting in the 1957 elections.

Aklan was represented in the Interim Batasang Pambansa as part of Region VI from 1978 to 1984. The province returned one representative, elected at-large, to the Regular Batasang Pambansa in 1984.

Under the new Constitution which was proclaimed on February 11, 1987, the province constituted a lone district which elected its member to the restored House of Representatives starting that same year.

The signing of Republic Act No. 11077 authored by Carlito S. Marquez on September 24, 2018 reapportioned Aklan into two legislative districts, which elected their separate representatives starting in the 2019 elections.

== Senatorial representation ==
Between 1916 and 1935, the territory of what is now Aklan (then part of the province of Capiz) was represented in the Senate of the Philippines through the 7th senatorial district of the Philippine Islands. However, in 1935, all senatorial districts were abolished when a unicameral National Assembly was installed under a new constitution following the passage of the Tydings–McDuffie Act, which established the Commonwealth of the Philippines. Since the 1941 elections, when the Senate was restored after a constitutional plebiscite, all twenty-four members of the upper house have been elected countrywide at-large.

== Congressional representation ==
Aklan has been represented in the lower house of various Philippine national legislatures since 1898, through its first and second congressional districts.

== Provincial board districts ==
The municipalities of Aklan are represented in the Aklan Provincial Board, the Sangguniang Panlalawigan (provincial legislature) of the province, through Aklan's first and second provincial board districts.

== Current districts and representatives ==
Legislative districts and congressional representatives of Aklan
District	Current representative	Party	Constituent LGUs	Population (2015)	Area
1st	Jesus R. Marquez (since 2025); Banga	NPC	List: Altavas; Balete; Banga; Batan; Kalibo; Libacao; Madalag; New Washington	297,318	
2nd	Florencio T. Miraflores (since 2025); Ibajay	NPC	List: Buruanga; Ibajay; Lezo; Makato; Malay; Malinao; Nabas; Numancia; Tangalan	277,505	

== See also ==
- Legislative districts of Capiz
