= Capiz's 3rd congressional district =

Congressional district of the Philippines

Capiz's 3rd congressional district was one of the three congressional districts of the Philippines in the province of Capiz in existence between 1907 and 1957. It was created under the Philippine Organic Act from former territories of the province. The district was composed of the municipalities of Buruanga, Ibajay, Malinao, Nabas and Taft in what is now the province of Aklan, and the municipalities of Badajoz, Cajidiocan, Looc, Odiongan, Romblon and San Fernando which now constitute the island province of Romblon. It was a single-member district throughout the ten legislatures of the Insular Government of the Philippine Islands from 1907 to 1935, the three legislatures of the Commonwealth of the Philippines from 1935 to 1946, and the first three congresses of the Third Philippine Republic from 1946 to 1957.

The district was represented by a total of fourteen representatives throughout its existence. In 1917, following the re-establishment of the province of Romblon, Capiz was redistricted, leaving the third district with only the municipalities in western Aklan including Calivo. The district was abolished in 1957 following the passage of Republic Act No. 1414 which created the province of Aklan.

It was last represented by Godofredo P. Ramos of the Nacionalista Party (NP).

== Representation history ==
#	Images	Member	Term of office		Legislature	Party	Electoral history	Constituent LGUs
#	Images	Member	Start	End	Legislature	Party	Electoral history	Constituent LGUs
=== Capiz's 3rd district for the Philippine Assembly ===
District created January 9, 1907.
1		Simeón Mobo	October 16, 1907	October 16, 1909	1st	Independent	Elected in 1907.	1907–1916; Badajoz, Buruanga, Cajidiocan, Ibajay, Looc, Malinao, Nabas, Odiongan, Romblon, San Fernando, Taft
2		Braulio C. Manican	October 16, 1909	October 16, 1912	2nd	Nacionalista	Elected in 1909.	1907–1916; Badajoz, Buruanga, Cajidiocan, Ibajay, Looc, Malinao, Nabas, Odiongan, Romblon, San Fernando, Taft
3		José Tiról	October 16, 1912	October 16, 1916	3rd	Progresista	Elected in 1912.	1907–1916; Badajoz, Buruanga, Cajidiocan, Ibajay, Looc, Malinao, Nabas, Odiongan, Romblon, San Fernando, Taft
=== Capiz's 3rd district for the House of Representatives of the Philippine Islands ===
4		Leonardo Festín	October 16, 1916	June 3, 1919	4th	Progresista	Elected in 1916. Redistricted to Romblon's at-large district.	1916–1919; Badajoz, Buruanga, Cajidiocan, Ibajay, Looc, Malinao, Nabas, Odiongan, Romblon, San Fernando, Taft
5		Eufrocinio Mobo Alba	June 3, 1919	February 9, 1921	5th	Nacionalista	Elected in 1919. Election annulled by electoral commission following an electoral protest.	1919–1935; Buruanga, Calivo, Ibajay, Lezo, Libacao, Makato, Malinao, Nabas
6		Gregorio Pastrana	February 9, 1921	June 6, 1922	5th	Nacionalista	Declared winner of 1919 elections.	1919–1935; Buruanga, Calivo, Ibajay, Lezo, Libacao, Makato, Malinao, Nabas
7		Manuel Terencio	June 6, 1922	June 2, 1925	6th	Nacionalista; Colectivista	Elected in 1922.	1919–1935; Buruanga, Calivo, Ibajay, Lezo, Libacao, Makato, Malinao, Nabas
8		Manuel Laserna	June 2, 1925	June 5, 1928	7th	Nacionalista; Consolidado	Elected in 1925.	1919–1935; Buruanga, Calivo, Ibajay, Lezo, Libacao, Makato, Malinao, Nabas
9		Teódulfo Suñer	June 5, 1928	June 2, 1931	8th	Nacionalista; Consolidado	Elected in 1928.	1919–1935; Buruanga, Calivo, Ibajay, Lezo, Libacao, Makato, Malinao, Nabas
10		Rufino L. Garde	June 2, 1931	January 23, 1932	9th	Nacionalista; Consolidado	Elected in 1931. Election annulled by House following an electoral protest.	1919–1935; Buruanga, Calivo, Ibajay, Lezo, Libacao, Makato, Malinao, Nabas
11		Rafael Tumbokon	January 23, 1932	September 16, 1935	9th	Nacionalista; Consolidado	Declared winner of 1931 elections.	1919–1935; Buruanga, Calivo, Ibajay, Lezo, Libacao, Makato, Malinao, Nabas
11		Rafael Tumbokon	January 23, 1932	September 16, 1935	10th	Nacionalista; Demócrata Pro-Independencia	Re-elected in 1934.	1919–1935; Buruanga, Calivo, Ibajay, Lezo, Libacao, Makato, Malinao, Nabas
#	Images	Member	Term of office		National Assembly	Party	Electoral history	Constituent LGUs
#	Images	Member	Start	End	National Assembly	Party	Electoral history	Constituent LGUs
=== Capiz's 3rd district for the National Assembly (Commonwealth of the Philippines) ===
(11)		Rafael Tumbokon	November 15, 1935	December 30, 1938	1st	Nacionalista; Demócrata Pro-Independencia	Re-elected in 1935.	1935–1941; Buruanga, Calivo, Ibajay, Lezo, Libacao, Makato, Malinao, Nabas
12		Juan M. Reyes	December 30, 1938	December 17, 1941	2nd	Nacionalista	Elected in 1938. Died.	1935–1941; Buruanga, Calivo, Ibajay, Lezo, Libacao, Makato, Malinao, Nabas
District dissolved into the two-seat Capiz's at-large district for the National Assembly (Second Philippine Republic).
#	Images	Member	Term of office		Common wealth Congress	Party	Electoral history	Constituent LGUs
#	Images	Member	Start	End	Common wealth Congress	Party	Electoral history	Constituent LGUs
=== Capiz's 3rd district for the House of Representatives of the Commonwealth of the Philippines ===
District re-created May 24, 1945.
(12)		Juan M. Reyes	–	–	1st	Nacionalista	Re-elected in 1941. Died before start of term.	1945–1946; Buruanga, Calivo, Ibajay, Lezo, Libacao, Makato, Malinao, Nabas, Numancia
#	Images	Member	Term of office		Congress	Party	Electoral history	Constituent LGUs
#	Images	Member	Start	End	Congress	Party	Electoral history	Constituent LGUs
=== Capiz's 3rd district for the House of Representatives of the Philippines ===
13		José M. Reyes	May 25, 1946	December 30, 1949	1st	Liberal	Elected in 1946.	1946–1949; Buruanga, Calivo, Ibajay, Lezo, Libacao, Makato, Malinao, Nabas, Numancia
14		Godofredo P. Ramos	December 30, 1949	December 30, 1957	2nd	Nacionalista	Elected in 1949.	1949–1957; Buruanga, Calivo, Ibajay, Lezo, Libacao, Madalag, Makato, Malay, Malinao, Nabas, Numancia, Tangalan
14		Godofredo P. Ramos	December 30, 1949	December 30, 1957	3rd	Nacionalista	Re-elected in 1953.	1949–1957; Buruanga, Calivo, Ibajay, Lezo, Libacao, Madalag, Makato, Malay, Malinao, Nabas, Numancia, Tangalan
District dissolved into Aklan's at-large district.

== See also ==
- Legislative districts of Capiz
