= Philippine House Committee on Economic Affairs =

Standing committee of the House of Representatives of the Philippines

Committee on Economic Affairs
- 20th Congress

History
- New session started: July 28, 2025

Leadership
- Chair: Antonio Legarda Jr., NPC since July 30, 2025
- Minority Leader: Vacant since June 30, 2025

Website
- Committee on Economic Affairs

The Philippine House Committee on Economic Affairs, or House Economic Affairs Committee is a standing committee of the Philippine House of Representatives.

== Jurisdiction ==
As prescribed by House Rules, the committee's jurisdiction is on the economic development planning and programs which includes the following:

- Development policies and strategies
- Economic and socio-economic studies

== Members, 20th Congress ==
Position	Member	Constituency	Party
Chairperson	Antonio Legarda Jr.	Antique at-large	NPC
Vice Chairpersons	Vacant		
Members for the Majority	Vacant		
Members for the Minority	Vacant		

== Historical membership rosters ==
=== 18th Congress ===
Position	Members	Party	Province/City	District
Chairperson	Teodorico Haresco Jr.	Nacionalista	Aklan	2nd
Vice Chairpersons	Horacio Suansing Jr.	NUP	Sultan Kudarat	2nd
Vice Chairpersons	Junie Cua	PDP–Laban	Quirino	Lone
Vice Chairpersons	Joey Salceda	PDP–Laban	Albay	2nd
Vice Chairpersons	Amihilda Sangcopan	Anak Mindanao	Party-list	
Members for the Majority	Edward Maceda	PMP	Manila	4th
Members for the Majority	Ronnie Ong	ANG PROBINSYANO	Party-list	
Members for the Majority	Jericho Jonas Nograles	PBA	Party-list	
Members for the Majority	Kristine Singson-Meehan	Bileg Ti Ilokano	Ilocos Sur	2nd
Members for the Majority	Estrellita Suansing	PDP–Laban	Nueva Ecija	1st
Members for the Majority	Braeden John Biron	Nacionalista	Iloilo	4th
Members for the Majority	Jose Francisco Benitez	PDP–Laban	Negros Occidental	3rd
Members for the Majority	Michael Gorriceta	Nacionalista	Iloilo	2nd
Members for the Majority	Alyssa Sheena Tan	PFP	Isabela	4th
Members for the Majority	Antonio Albano	NUP	Isabela	1st
Members for the Majority	Lucy Torres-Gomez	PDP–Laban	Leyte	4th
Members for the Majority	Erico Aristotle Aumentado	NPC	Bohol	2nd
Members for the Majority	Rozzano Rufino Biazon	PDP–Laban	Muntinlupa	Lone
Members for the Majority	Lorenz Defensor	PDP–Laban	Iloilo	3rd
Members for the Majority	Jose Enrique Garcia III	NUP	Bataan	2nd
Members for the Majority	Rufus Rodriguez	CDP	Cagayan de Oro	2nd
Members for the Majority	Manuel Zubiri	Bukidnon Paglaum	Bukidnon	3rd
Members for the Majority	Michael Edgar Aglipay	DIWA	Party-list	
Members for the Majority	Jose Gay Padiernos	GP	Party-list	
Members for the Majority	Presley De Jesus	PHILRECA	Party-list	
Members for the Majority	Cristal Bagatsing	PDP–Laban	Manila	5th
Members for the Majority	Julienne Baronda	NUP	Iloilo City	Lone
Members for the Majority	Edgar Chatto	Liberal	Bohol	1st
Members for the Majority	Victor Yap	NPC	Tarlac	2nd
Members for the Majority	Robert Ace Barbers	Nacionalista	Surigao del Norte	2nd
Members for the Majority	Shernee Tan	Kusug Tausug	Party-list	
Members for the Minority	Stella Luz Quimbo	Liberal	Marikina	2nd
Members for the Minority	Francisca Castro	ACT TEACHERS	Party-list	
Members for the Minority	Angelica Natasha Co	BHW	Party-list	

==== Chairperson ====
- Sharon Garin (AAMBIS-OWA) July 22, 2019 – October 6, 2020

== See also ==
- House of Representatives of the Philippines
- List of Philippine House of Representatives committees
- National Economic and Development Authority
