= Aklan's 2nd congressional district =

House of Representatives of the Philippines legislative district

- Constituency for the House of Representatives of the Philippines
- Map Boundary of Aklan's 2nd congressional district in Aklan
- Location of Aklan within the Philippines
- Province: Aklan
- Region: Western Visayas
- Population: 301,700 (2020)
- Electorate: 200,623 (2022)
- Major settlements: 8 LGUs: Municipalities; Buruanga; Ibajay; Lezo; Makato; Malay; Malinao; Nabas; Numancia; Tangalan

Current constituency
- Created: 2018
- Representative: Florencio Miraflores
- Political party: NPC
- Congressional bloc: Majority

Aklan's 2nd congressional district is one of the two congressional districts of the Philippines in the province of Aklan. It has been represented in the House of Representatives of the Philippines since 2019. The district consists of the municipalities of Buruanga, Ibajay, Lezo, Makato, Malay, Malinao, Nabas, Numancia, and Tangalan. It is currently represented in the 20th Congress by Florencio Miraflores of the Nationalist People's Coalition (NPC).

== List of members representing the district ==
=== House of Representatives (1987–present) ===
No.	Portrait	Member	Term of office		Legislature	Party	Electoral history	Constituent LGUs
No.	Portrait	Member	Start	End	Legislature	Party	Electoral history	Constituent LGUs
District created August 28, 2018 from Aklan's at-large district.
1		Teodorico Haresco Jr.	June 30, 2019	June 30, 2025	18th Congress	Nacionalista	Elected in 2019.	2019–present Buruanga, Ibajay, Lezo, Makato, Malay, Malinao, Nabas, Numancia, Tangalan
1		Teodorico Haresco Jr.	June 30, 2019	June 30, 2025	19th Congress	Nacionalista	Re-elected in 2022.	2019–present Buruanga, Ibajay, Lezo, Makato, Malay, Malinao, Nabas, Numancia, Tangalan
2		Florencio Miraflores	June 30, 2025	Incumbent	20th Congress	NPC	Re-elected in 2025.	2019–present Buruanga, Ibajay, Lezo, Makato, Malay, Malinao, Nabas, Numancia, Tangalan

== Election results ==
=== 2019 ===
2019 Philippine House of Representatives election in Aklan
Party	Candidate	Votes	%
Nacionalista	Teodorico Haresco Jr.	92,292	64.27
NPC	Vicky Ramos	49,073	34.17
PFP	Leovigildo Mationg	978	0.68
Independent	Johnny Tumbokon	708	0.49
Total votes		143,605	100.00
Nacionalista win (new seat)			

=== 2022 ===
2022 Philippine House of Representatives election in Aklan
Party	Candidate	Votes	%
Nacionalista	Teodorico Haresco Jr. (incumbent)	134,436	87.43
Independent	Virgilita Pamatian	11,130	7.24
Independent	Matias Wacan	8,206	5.34
Total votes		153,772	100.00
Nacionalista hold			

=== 2025 ===
2025 Philippine House of Representatives election in Aklan
Party	Candidate	Votes	%
NPC	Florencio Miraflores	88,795	50.82
Nacionalista	Teodorico Haresco Jr. (incumbent)	85,253	48.79
Independent	Jun Tanumtanum	685	0.39
Total votes		174,733	100.00
NPC gain from Nacionalista			

== See also ==
- Legislative districts of Aklan
