= Teodorico Haresco Jr. =

Filipino politician

Teodorico "Nonong" Haresco
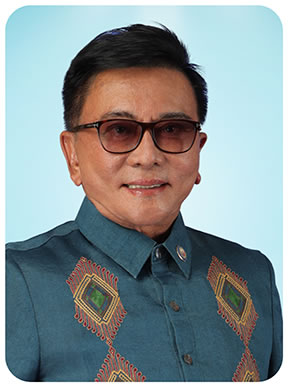
- Official portrait, 2022

Member of the Philippine House of Representatives from the Aklan's 2nd district
- In office June 30, 2019 – June 30, 2025
- Preceded by: Position created
- Succeeded by: Florencio Miraflores

Chairman of the House Committee on Economic Affairs
- In office October 6, 2020 – June 30, 2025
- Preceded by: Sharon Garin

Member of the Philippine House of Representatives from Aklan's Lone District
- In office June 30, 2013 – June 30, 2016
- Preceded by: Florencio Miraflores
- Succeeded by: Carlito Marquez

Member of the Philippine House of Representatives for the Ang Kasangga Partylist
- In office June 30, 2010 – June 30, 2013

Personal details
- Born: Teodorico Tumbocon Haresco Jr. August 12, 1950 (age 76) Iloilo City, Iloilo, Philippines
- Citizenship: Philippines
- Party: Nacionalista (2015–present)
- Other political affiliations: Independent (2012–2015); Ang Kasangga (partylist; 2009–2013)
- Spouse: Yulia Tyulyupa
- Education: De La Salle University (BA, BS); McGill University (MA)

Teodorico "Nonong" Tumbocon Haresco, Jr. is a Filipino politician, and businessman. He served as representative for Aklan's 2nd district from 2019 to 2025. Before the creation of the 2nd District, he served as a Representative of the Lone District of Aklan from 2013 to 2016. Formerly, he was a party-list representative of the Ang Kasangga Party-list from 2010 to 2013 in the 15th Congress of the Philippines.

He is the cousin of the Aklan Incumbent Governor Florencio Miraflores. He is one of the sponsors of House Bill 05712, also known as Republic Act 11466 entitled An Act Modifying the Salary Schedule for Civilian Government Personnel and Authorizing the Grant of Additional Benefits, and for Other Purposes.

== Early life and education ==
Teodorico "Nonong" Haresco was born in Iloilo in the Province of Iloilo, Philippines on August 12, 1950. He finished Bachelor of Arts in Economics and Bachelor of Science in accounting in 1973 from the De La Salle University in Manila, and earned his master's degree in International Economics in 1978 from the McGill University in Montreal, Canada.

In 1980, Haresco completed an Aquaculture Productivity and Management Course (APDEM) organized by the Southeast Asian Fisheries Development Center (SEAFDEC) at the University of the Philippines Diliman in Quezon City.

== Career in the private sector ==
Haresco founded the Haresco Trade Specialists Co. and Silver Thread Inc., which specialized in the exportation of local Capiz Shells from different provinces of Western Visayas to Europe. He was a former managing director at Asia-Pacific Matière in France and Mabey Group in the UK. He also served as a member of the board of directors of the Philippine National Oil Company (PNOC).

In 1975, Haresco also worked as a Project Economist at the Agriculture Section II of the UNCTAD-ITC at the International Trade Center in Geneva, Switzerland.

== Political career ==
Haresco's political career began in 2010 when he was nominated as a Representative of the Ang Kasangga Partylist in the 15th Congress of the Philippines, representing the marginalized sector of micro-entrepreneurs.

In 2013, Haresco decided to run and won as a district representative of the Lone District of Aklan in the 16th Congress of the Philippines. In 2016, he ran again for the same position but lost to former Aklan Governor Carlito Marquez during the Philippine's May 2016 Elections.

In 2018, Republic Act No. 11077 was enacted creating the Second District of Aklan principally authored by former Aklan Governor and now Representative of 1st District of Aklan Carlito Marquez. Haresco ran in Congress for Second District of Aklan against Anita Victoria Ramos-Antonino, daughter of Former Congressman Godofredo Ramos. He won as a representative of this newly created legislative district in the 18th Congress of the Philippines.

As a congressman, Haresco's policy focus is the promotion of MSMEs (Micro Small and Medium Enterprises) as a way to uplift the Filipino from poverty. He introduced House Bill 03776 which seeks to empowering the micro, small, and medium enterprises by providing better safeguards to small businesses and encouraging Filipinos to engage in entrepreneurship by opening additional financial opportunities such as low interest loans for business start-ups.

Haresco authored HB 4175 or An Act Creating the Boracay Island Council which seeks to create a local council composed of local government officials in the Island to handle the management, regulation, development, protection, and maintenance of the Boracay Island.

One of the major challenges in his political career was in 2014 when Haresco was falsely accused of issuing fake Special Allotment Release Orders forms (SARO). The NBI and DOJ cleared him of all charges after the State's National Bureau of Investigation (NBI) failed to produce enough evidence.

On October 6, 2020, Haresco is appointed as the Chairman of the House Committee on Economic Affairs.

Haresco was re-elected in 2022, but was defeated in 2025 to former Governor Florencio Miraflores.

== Awards and achievements ==
- Second Honors, De La Salle University (1973)
- Nominee, Ten Most Outstanding Aklanon (1985)
- Most Outstanding Project, Manila Jaycees (1985)
- Postal Bank Board Commendation (May 1994)
- Deutsche Bank Banker of the Year Award (2005)
- People Asia's Person of the Year (2008)
- PCCI's "Businessman of the Year" (Pearl Award 2008)
- One of the Modern Day Filipino Heroes (2008)
- Queen's Awards for Enterprise for WINSOURCE Solutions Inc.
- Most Outstanding Award on Business Entrepreneurship

== Other references ==
- Haresco, Teodorico T. "Member Information: Haresco, Teodorico T." House of Representatives of the Philippines.

House of Representatives of the Philippines
| New seat | Representative, Ang Kasangga Partylist; 2010–2013 | Vacant |
| Preceded by Florencio Miraflores | Representative, Lone District of Aklan; 2013–2016 | Succeeded by Carlito Marquez |
| New seat | Representative, 2nd District of Aklan; 2019–present | Incumbent |
