= Numancia, Aklan =

Municipality in Aklan, Philippines

Numancia
- Municipality
- Municipality of Numancia
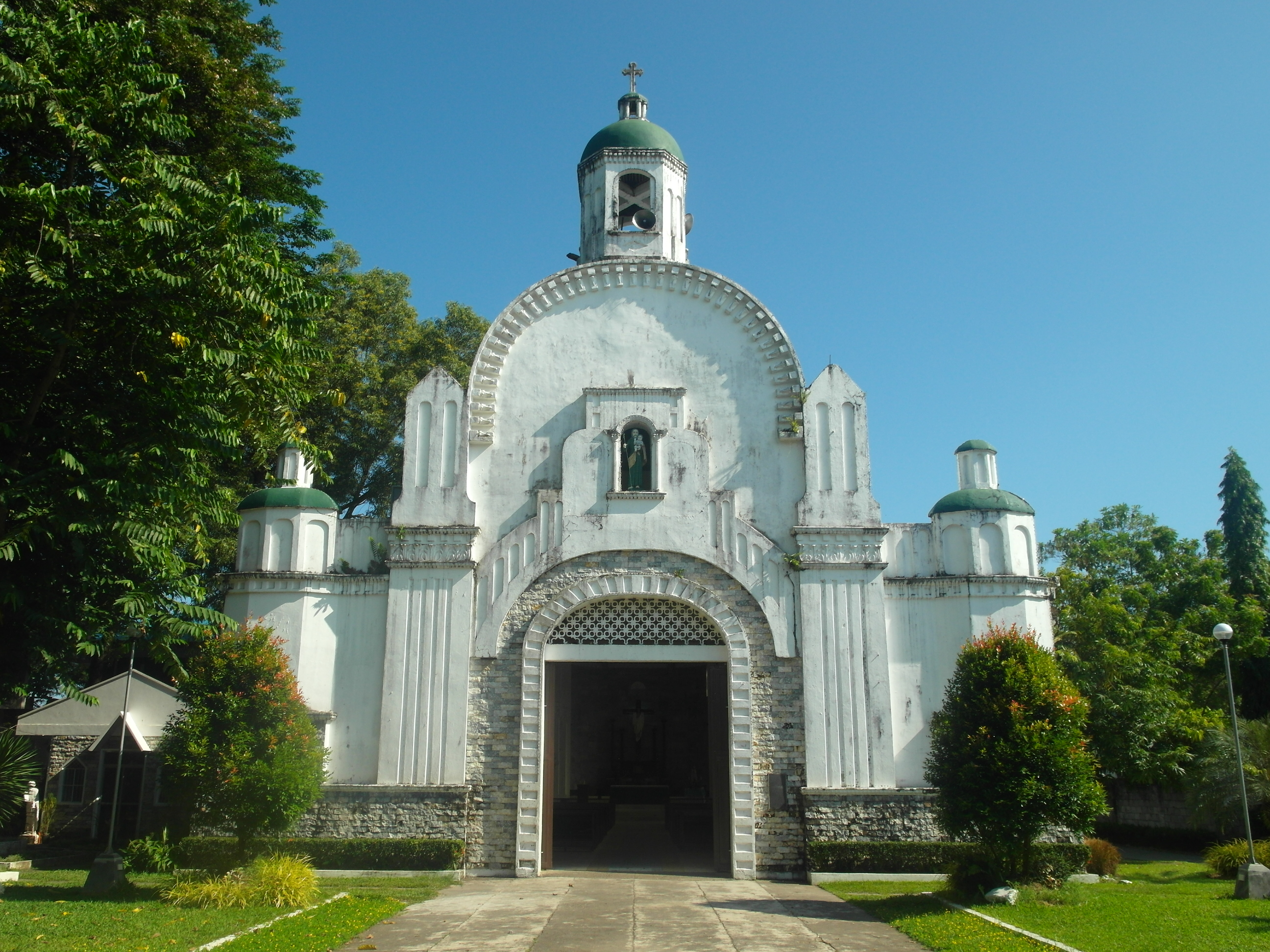
- Church of Numancia

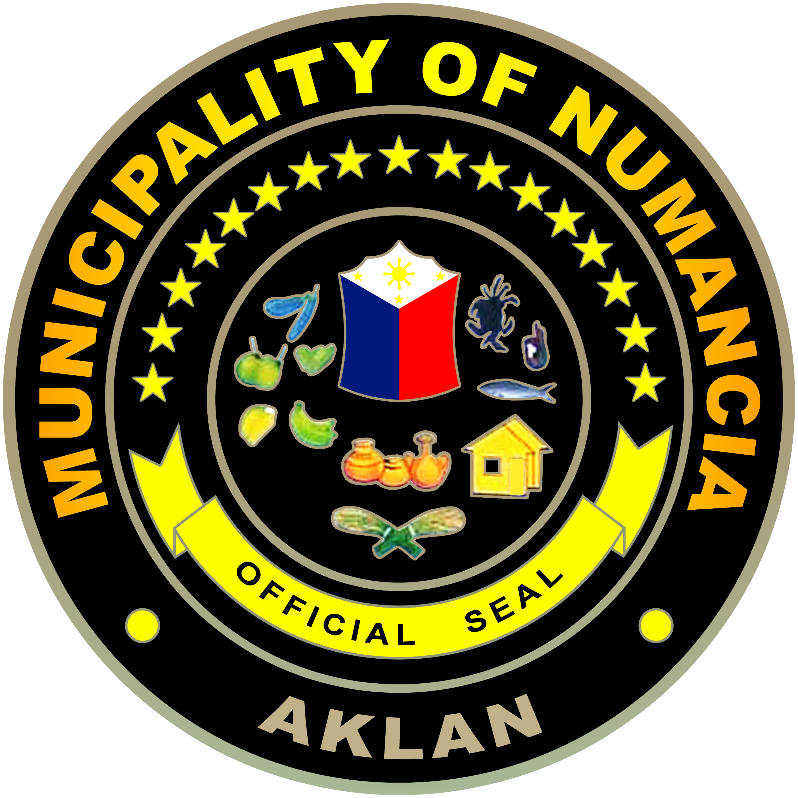
- Flag Seal

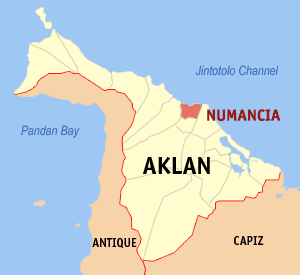
- Map of Aklan with Numancia highlighted
- Interactive map of Numancia
- Location within the Philippines
- Coordinates: 11°42′15″N 122°19′44″E
- Country: Philippines
- Region: Western Visayas
- Province: Aklan
- District: 2nd district
- Founded: 1920
- Barangays: 17 (see Barangays)

Government
  - Type: Sangguniang Bayan
  - Mayor: Rogelio M. Enero II
  - Vice Mayor: Mariel Cielo M. Coching
  - Representative: Florencio T. Miraflores
  - Municipal Council: Members: Mariel Cielo M. Coching; Jerome T. Vega; Rose F. Nepomuceno; Florentino C. Fernandez; Adelma T. Regalado; Jossel V. Maribojo Jr.; Lilyn V. Jauod; Romeo N. Ricafuente
  - Electorate: 26,088 voters (2025)

Area
  - Total: 28.84 km^{2} (11.14 sq mi)
- Elevation: 35 m (115 ft)
- Highest elevation: 940 m (3,080 ft)
- Lowest elevation: 0 m (0 ft)

Population (2024 census)
  - Total: 37,428
  - Density: 1,298/km^{2} (3,361/sq mi)
  - Households: 8,608

Economy
  - Income class: 3rd municipal income class
  - Poverty incidence: 2.85% (2023)
  - Revenue: ₱ 163.3 million (2024)
  - Assets: ₱ 590.1 million (2024)
  - Expenditure: ₱ 123.1 million (2024)
  - Liabilities: ₱ 52.52 million (2024)

Service provider
  - Electricity: Aklan Electric Cooperative (AKELCO)
- Time zone: UTC+8 (PST)
- ZIP code: 5604
- PSGC: 060416000
- IDD : area code: +63 (0)36
- Native languages: Aklanon; Hiligaynon; Tagalog

Numancia, officially the Municipality of Numancia (Aklanon: Banwa it Numancia; Hiligaynon: Banwa sang Numancia; Tagalog: Bayan ng Numancia), is a municipality in the province of Aklan, Philippines. According to the 2024 census, it has a population of 37,428 people.

== History ==
Numancia was originally known as Majanos. The name Majanos of Malayan in origin could mean "lowland" for this is the only town in the Province of Aklan that has no highland or even a small hill. From Numancia one can view the mountain of Majaas with its peak shaped like a sarok or sadok. The name Madyaas may have been derived from the Filipino word mataas, which means "high".

When the ten Malay Datus arrived from Borneo, they bought the island of Panay, formerly called the Aninipay from the Aeta Chief Marikudo. The transaction was known as the barter of Panay, Datu Puti gave a sarok to Marikudo and the gold necklace of Kapinagan, and wife of Datu Puti was given to Maniwangtiwan, the wife of Marikudo. There were other goods involved in the transaction and Marikudo gave the lowland area to Datu Puti and members of his party while Marikudo and his tribe occupied the high lands or the hills and the mountains.

During the 13th century. after having explored the whole island, the Malay leaders met and organized the Madjaas Confederacy or the Katilingban it Madjaas. They divided the islands in three sakops or provinces and naming them Akean, Hantik and Irong-Irong. Sumakwel was assigned as head of Hantik, Bangkaya was assigned as head of Akean, and Paiburong was assigned as head of Irong-Irong. Sumakwel who was the senior among the three heads was chosen by popular votes to head the confederation.

The capitals of each sakop or province are the following: Bugasong in Hantik, Ogtom in Irong-Irong and Madjanos in Akean. Since Sumakwel was the first punu-an of the Madjaas Confederacy, Bugasong was the first capital of Panay.

Many historical accounts have different versions about the exact locations of the first settlement established by Bangkaya in Aklan. In Numancia there is still the small river called Madjanos that serves the boundary between Marianos and Languinbanwa. This river used to be wide and navigable. According to the old folks, sailboats used to sail up to this river but because of floods, mudflows and silting, it became narrow and shallow.

Barangay Marianos could be the very place where Datu bangkaya and his family lived together with the other Malay families who arrived with him. The present name of this barangay was corrupted to Marianos. It is not difficult to guess with less margin of error that the original name of this barangay is Madjanos considering that the Madjanos River is still there retaining its old name. The “d” in Madjanos in the course of time was eroded and replaced by letter “r” due to the dominance of the letter “r” in the Spanish language. Add the fact that the former priest by the name of Padre Mariano formerly lived in this barangay must have gradually influenced the corruption of the name Madjanos to Marianos.

In the course of time, Madjanos like the other settlements in the island of Panay became a thriving community. The population increased and more settlers came. Many other settlements were established and were scattered throughout the whole province up to what is now the province of Capiz, Capiz was formerly a part of Aklan but later the whole province was named Capiz during the arrival of Legaspi in Panay.

The eighteenth century records in the national archive and historical sketches by some local chroniclers show that there were two names mentioned pertaining to the town of Numancia. They were Madjanos and Lawan. Lawan consists of what is now Albasan is located along seashores while Madjanos located inland. Madjanos is grown into a township, when reached up to the west bank of Aklan River. It has its own church and trading post.

Since the confederation has expanded to include Lusong, Buglas, Rorom, Sugbo and Mait, volumes of trades increased. Chinese, Indonesians and Malayan traders came to trade. When Balinganga, the son of Datu Bangkaya, was the Punuan of the Minuro it Aklan and at the same time the head of Madjaas Confederacy and shortly after the death of Datu Paiburong, Madjanos was again the seat of the whole government of Panay and consequently became the national capital of Pre-Hispanic Philippines.

The Minuro it Aklan became the clearing port of immigrants coming from other places. For more than fifty years Balinganga ruled the confederacy reminding his subject about the Code of Sumakwel. In the meanwhile, he followed the policy of his father throughout the Katilingban of Madjaas. From the death of Balinganga up to the arrival of Legaspi in 1570, several successors has ruled the province of Aklan and the seat of the government was transferred to different places due to demographic movement and the exigency of time.

The old site of Madjanos, which is quite neglected, was renamed Laguinbanwa meaning "old town" in 1620 to revive the former vitality of the community. The town of Laguinbanwa included the territories, which is now occupied by Lezo and Numancia. But as the community across the Aklan River became more prosperous, the seat of the town was transferred in 1785 to what is now Kalibo, and Lezo and Numancia became barrios of Kalibo.

As the town of Kalibo grew in importance it has become the hub where people gathered for important celebrations and where other municipalities pay their tribute money or taxes. Every Sunday people faithfully attended mass in Kalibo since the priests make church attendance compulsory especially during fiestas and other religious holidays. The people faithfully followed the priests because they feared divine punishment and the disapproval of church authorities. As a result, they regularly attended Mass and confessed their sins to seek absolution.

At the time, however, there were no good roads, only trails and there were no strong bridges to span wide Aklan River. During the rainy season, it was difficult to cross the swollen river. In view of this, the residents of Laguinbanwa and Guicod petitioned to the bishop of Cebu and the Military governor of the Visayas to allow them to build their own church and to have a separate municipality explaining their problems and difficulties.

After assessing the situation, the Bishop of Cebu and the military governor of the Visayas considered that the people of Laguinbanwa and Guicod are capable of providing tribute tax to run their own municipality informed the leaders of Laguinbanwa that they interpose no objection to their objection to separate from Kalibo. They requested that delegates should be sent to Kalibo were representatives of the bishop and the military governor will hear their cases.

A delegation from Laguinbanwa headed by Silvino Kimpo met the representative of the bishop and the military governor of the Visayas in Kalibo where they talked about their petition. When they were asked where to place their town and where to build their church, they explained that the consensus of the people in Laguinbanwa, Madjanos, and Lauan and also Guicod was to put the Poblacion in what is now the site of Numancia being the center of these communities. Most of the members of the delegation of Tan Binong came from Madjanos and Laguinbanwa. So in 1856 Numancia was constituted as a municipality with Silvino Kimpo as the First Head of Kapitan Basal The appointment was approved by the Provincial Chief Executive and carried a term of two years.

=== Numancia as integrated with Banga, Lezo, and Kalibo ===
When the Americans came in 1899, the military government appointed Felix Kimpo as head of the town. During the election in 1901 he was elected as the president from 1901 to 1903. At that time there were 34 towns in the province of Capiz, but these were reduced to 24 towns by a law passed by the civil Commission when it was found out that some towns were incapable of meeting their financial obligations and maintenance. So on March 4, 1904, an executive order was passed fusing Banga, Lezo, Numancia, and Kalibo into one municipality.

=== Numancia as Barrio of Lezo/Lezo as Part of Numancia ===
Five years after on July 31, 1909, the civil commission passed another law separation Lezo and Numancia from Kalibo and making Lezo as the seat of government. Numancia then, became a barrio of Lezo. In 1920 the situation was reversed with regards to the status of Lezo and Numancia. By Executive Order No. 17, series of 1920, the seat of government was transferred to Numancia and Lezo became a barrio of Numancia.

=== Separation of Lezo from Numancia ===
Before the outbreak of the Second World War, President Manuel L. Quezon issued Executive Order No. 364 series of 1941 dated August 28, 1941 making Lezo a separate municipality from Numancia. The actual inauguration for the separation of Lezo from Numancia was deferred to January 1, 1945. On this date both Lezo and Numancia became separate municipalities.

== Geography ==
Numancia is bounded on the east by Kalibo, the north by the Sibuyan Sea, the west by Makato, and the south by Lezo. It is 5 kilometres (3.1 mi) from Kalibo, the provincial capital.

Because of its proximity to Kalibo, majority of its barangays are classified as urbanized making the municipality the second most densely populated municipality in the province with 1,200 inhabitants per square kilometres.

According to the Philippine Statistics Authority, the municipality has a land area of 28.84 square kilometres (11.14 sq mi) constituting 1.58% of the 1,821.42-square-kilometre- (703.25 sq mi) total area of Aklan.

=== Climate ===
Climate data for Numancia, Aklan
Month	Jan	Feb	Mar	Apr	May	Jun	Jul	Aug	Sep	Oct	Nov	Dec	Year
Mean daily maximum °C (°F)	28 (82)	29 (84)	30 (86)	32 (90)	32 (90)	31 (88)	30 (86)	30 (86)	29 (84)	29 (84)	29 (84)	28 (82)	30 (86)
Mean daily minimum °C (°F)	23 (73)	22 (72)	23 (73)	24 (75)	25 (77)	25 (77)	25 (77)	24 (75)	25 (77)	24 (75)	24 (75)	23 (73)	24 (75)
Average precipitation mm (inches)	47 (1.9)	33 (1.3)	39 (1.5)	48 (1.9)	98 (3.9)	150 (5.9)	169 (6.7)	147 (5.8)	163 (6.4)	172 (6.8)	118 (4.6)	80 (3.1)	1,264 (49.8)
Average rainy days	11.4	8.2	9.3	9.7	19.1	25.6	27.4	25.5	25.5	25.2	18.5	14.5	219.9
Source: Meteoblue (Use with caution: this is modeled/calculated data, not measured locally.)

=== Barangays ===
Numancia is politically subdivided into 17 barangays. Each barangay consists of puroks and some have sitios.

Currently, barangays Poblacion, Bulwang, Laguinbanua East and West are considered urban while the rest are classified as rural.

PSGC	Barangay	Population			±% p.a.	
		2024		2010		
060416001	Albasan	4.1%	1,526	1,503	▴	0.11%
060416002	Aliputos	6.7%	2,493	2,132	▴	1.09%
060416003	Badio	4.1%	1,551	1,470	▴	0.37%
060416004	Bubog	4.4%	1,647	1,639	▴	0.03%
060416006	Bulwang	11.8%	4,401	4,170	▴	0.37%
060416007	Camanci Norte	7.7%	2,880	2,488	▴	1.02%
060416008	Camanci Sur	2.9%	1,085	977	▴	0.73%
060416009	Dongon East	5.1%	1,915	1,593	▴	1.28%
060416010	Dongon West	5.8%	2,185	2,071	▴	0.37%
060416011	Joyao-Joyao	4.5%	1,696	1,609	▴	0.36%
060416012	Laguinbanua East	6.3%	2,354	2,081	▴	0.86%
060416013	Laguinbanua West	4.6%	1,714	1,708	▴	0.02%
060416014	Marianos	2.8%	1,052	1,003	▴	0.33%
060416015	Navitas	3.9%	1,451	1,465	▾	−0.07%
060416016	Poblacion	4.2%	1,573	1,536	▴	0.16%
060416017	Pusiw	3.9%	1,454	1,484	▾	−0.14%
060416018	Tabangka	2.6%	957	933	▴	0.18%
	Total		37,428	29,862	▴	1.57%

== Demographics ==
Population census of Numancia
Year	Pop.	±% p.a.
1903	6,548	—
1939	12,883	+1.90%
1948	9,065	−3.83%
1960	10,194	+0.98%
1970	12,285	+1.88%
1975	13,764	+2.31%
1980	16,216	+3.33%
1990	19,899	+2.07%
1995	22,356	+2.21%
2000	24,614	+2.08%
2007	27,570	+1.58%
2010	29,862	+2.95%
2015	31,934	+1.29%
2020	35,693	+2.37%
2024	37,428	+1.15%
Source: Philippine Statistics Authority

In the 2024 census, Numancia had a population of 37,428 people. The population density was 1,300 inhabitants per square kilometre (3,400/sq mi).

=== Language ===
Aklanon is the main dialect of Numancia while Hiligaynon is used as a secondary dialect in the town.

== Economy ==
Poverty incidence of Numancia (%)

Source: Philippine Statistics Authority

== Tourism ==
Numancia's tourist attractions include beach resort situated along coastline barangays like the Doña Crispina Beach Resort and Hotel and other existing Beach resorts in Barangay Navitas and in Barangay Camanci Norte and Nadal Castle in Laguinbanua West (Nadal Castle is already closed; Allegedly due to bankruptcy).

== Education ==
The Numancia Schools District Office governs all educational institutions within the municipality. It oversees the management and operations of all private and public, from primary to secondary schools.

Numancia is home to the lone seminary in Aklan. By reason of its proximity to Kalibo, only few schools were established in the town. The following are the major schools of the municipality:

=== Primary and elementary schools ===
- Albasan Elementary School
- Aliputos Elementary School
- Badio Elementary School
- Bubog Elementary School
- Bulwang Elementary School
- Camanci Norte Elementary School
- Camanci Sur Elementary School
- Dongon Elementary School
- Laguinbanua Elementary School
- Navitas Elementary School
- Numancia Integrated School
- Pusiw Elementary School
- St. Joseph Parochial Learning Center
- Sto. Niño Seminary

=== Secondary schools ===
- Irao Technical College
- Madyaas Institute
- Numancia Integrated School
- Numancia National School of Fisheries
- Sto. Niño Seminary

== Media ==
- The location includes GMA Network stations GMA TV-2 (DYBB) and GTV-27 (DXBL), which relay to neighboring Kalibo and surrounding areas.
