= Buruanga =

Municipality in Aklan, Philippines

- Municipality
- Municipality of Buruanga
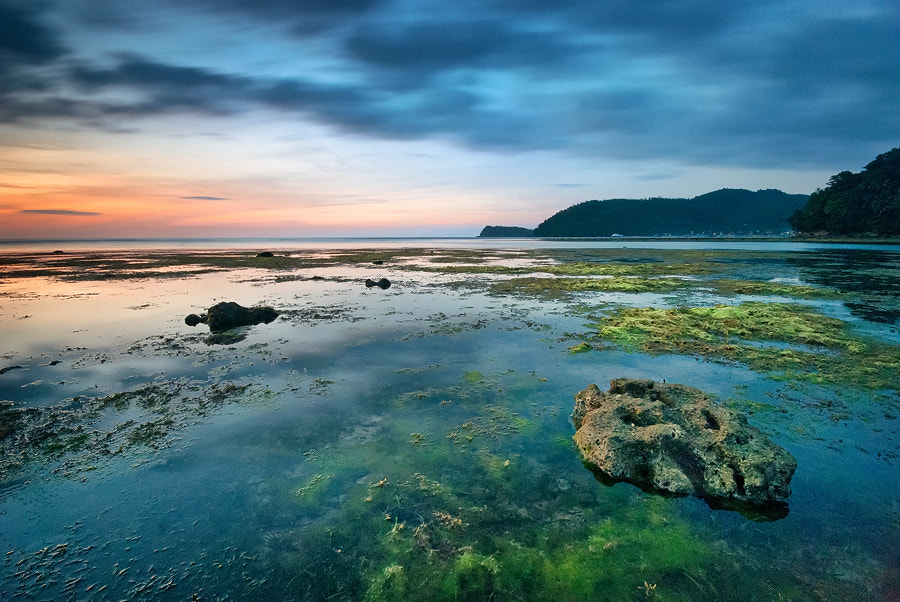
- Coastal area in Buruanga

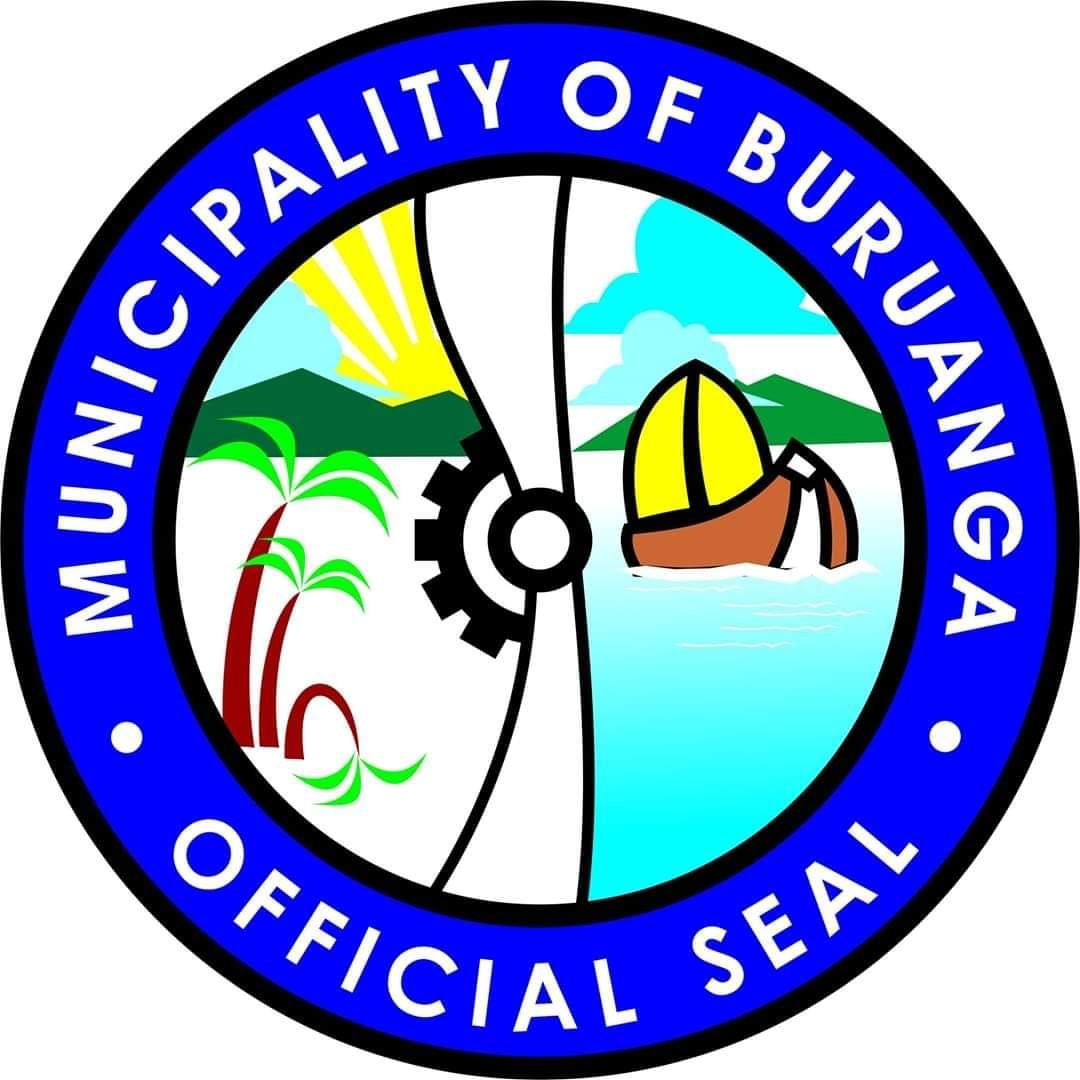
- Flag Seal

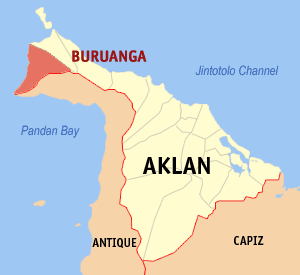
- Map of Aklan with Buruanga highlighted
- Interactive map of Buruanga
- Location within the Philippines
- Coordinates: 11°50′38″N 121°53′20″E
- Country: Philippines
- Region: Western Visayas
- Province: Aklan
- District: 2nd district
- Barangays: 15 (see Barangays)

Government
  - Type: Sangguniang Bayan
  - Mayor: Hon. Allan P. Dagohoy
  - Vice Mayor: Femy C. Dumaguin
  - Representative: Teodorico T. Haresco Jr.
  - Municipal Council: Members: Wevena Q. Malayas; Allan P. Dagohoy; Dextero S. Obrique; Gerald A. Panagsagan; Jerry F. Dagohoy; Joseph C. de la Peña; Ferolina D. Beliran; Carlos D. Dumalaog
  - Electorate: 12,915 voters (2025)

Area
  - Total: 88.50 km^{2} (34.17 sq mi)
- Elevation: 47 m (154 ft)
- Highest elevation: 883 m (2,897 ft)
- Lowest elevation: 0 m (0 ft)

Population (2024 census)
  - Total: 19,878
  - Density: 224.6/km^{2} (581.7/sq mi)
  - Households: 4,874

Economy
  - Income class: 4th municipal income class
  - Poverty incidence: 9.91% (2023)
  - Revenue: ₱ 137.3 million (2024)
  - Assets: ₱ 354 million (2024)
  - Expenditure: ₱ 722.4 million (2024)
  - Liabilities: ₱ 22.28 million (2024)

Service provider
  - Electricity: Aklan Electric Cooperative (AKELCO)
- Time zone: UTC+8 (PST)
- ZIP code: 5609
- PSGC: 0600405000
- IDD : area code: +63 (0)36
- Native languages: Aklanon; Ati; Hiligaynon; Tagalog
- Website: buruanga.gov.ph

Buruanga, officially the Municipality of Buruanga (Aklanon: Banwa it Buruanga; Hiligaynon: Banwa sang Buruanga; Tagalog: Bayan ng Buruanga), is a municipality in the province of Aklan, Philippines. It is the farthest town of Aklan from its provincial capital. According to the 2024 census, it has a population of 19,878 people.

== History ==
The name Buruanga came from the word Busuanga meaning "eruption" or "swell". Frequently harassed by inundations from the river, the early residents constructed earthen dams which were subsequently washed away. The people named the river "Busuanga," which later became the name of the Municipality. When the Spaniards arrived, they renamed Busuanga to Buruanga, or perhaps the change was purely a clerical error. The present municipality of Malay, including Boracay, was once a part of Buruanga. On June 15, 1949, the enactment of Republic Act 391 separated Malay from Buruanga to become an independent municipality.

It was hit severely by typhoon Seniang on 9–10 December 2006, with much destruction and damage of homes and infrastructure.

== Geography ==
Buruanga is located at the western tip of Panay Island. It is a coastal town bounded on the north by Malay; south by Libertad, Antique; and west by the Cuyo East Pass of the Sulu Sea. It is 81 kilometres (50 mi) from the provincial capital Kalibo and 165 kilometres (103 mi) from San Jose de Buenavista.

According to the Philippine Statistics Authority, the municipality has a land area of 88.50 square kilometres (34.17 sq mi) constituting 4.86% of the 1,821.42-square-kilometre- (703.25 sq mi) total area of Aklan.

=== Barangays ===
Buruanga is administratively subdivided into 15 barangays. Each barangay consists of puroks and some have sitios.

PSGC	Barangay	Population			±% p.a.	
		2024		2010		
060405001	Alegria	8.6%	1,709	1,695	▴	0.06%
060405002	Bagongbayan	5.3%	1,050	951	▴	0.69%
060405003	Balusbos	5.5%	1,085	930	▴	1.08%
060405004	Bel-is	3.6%	722	695	▴	0.27%
060405005	Cabugan	4.4%	882	696	▴	1.66%
060405006	El Progreso	5.8%	1,147	946	▴	1.35%
060405007	Habana	9.3%	1,850	1,605	▴	0.99%
060405008	Katipunan	10.1%	2,006	1,708	▴	1.12%
060405009	Mayapay	5.6%	1,106	1,033	▴	0.48%
060405010	Nazareth	9.7%	1,923	1,696	▴	0.88%
060405011	Panilongan	6.0%	1,186	1,062	▴	0.77%
060405012	Poblacion	5.3%	1,062	1,116	▾	−0.34%
060405013	Santander	6.7%	1,330	1,210	▴	0.66%
060405014	Tag-osip	1.5%	299	255	▴	1.11%
060405015	Tigum	8.3%	1,646	1,364	▴	1.32%
	Total		19,878	16,962	▴	1.11%

=== Climate ===
Climate data for Buruanga, Aklan
Month	Jan	Feb	Mar	Apr	May	Jun	Jul	Aug	Sep	Oct	Nov	Dec	Year
Mean daily maximum °C (°F)	28 (82)	29 (84)	30 (86)	32 (90)	32 (90)	31 (88)	30 (86)	30 (86)	29 (84)	29 (84)	29 (84)	28 (82)	30 (86)
Mean daily minimum °C (°F)	23 (73)	22 (72)	23 (73)	24 (75)	25 (77)	25 (77)	25 (77)	24 (75)	24 (75)	24 (75)	24 (75)	23 (73)	24 (75)
Average precipitation mm (inches)	47 (1.9)	33 (1.3)	39 (1.5)	48 (1.9)	98 (3.9)	150 (5.9)	169 (6.7)	147 (5.8)	163 (6.4)	172 (6.8)	118 (4.6)	80 (3.1)	1,264 (49.8)
Average rainy days	11.4	8.2	9.3	9.7	19.1	25.6	27.4	25.5	25.5	25.2	18.5	14.5	219.9
Source: Meteoblue (Use with caution: this is modeled/calculated data, not measured locally.)

There is one prevailing type of climate identified as Type I, two pronounced seasons which are dry from November to April and wet for the rest of the year. This is also true in all municipalities of Western Aklan such as Malay (excluding Boracay Island) and Nabas, as well as the Western portion of the municipalities bounding Antique.

In these areas, including Buruanga, the wettest month is August with rainfall averaging 625 millimetres (24.6 in) and the driest is March with rainfall of only about 150 millimetres (5.9 in). The average temperature if the area is 27.9 °C (82.2 °F) with an average humidity of 77.8%. The wet season coincides with the planting of rice while offshore fishing is in full gear during the dry season. Typhoons and strong winds rarely occur, and if it ever occurs, it coincides with the wet season. The humid north-western monsoon arrives in the area by June causing an increase in rainfall which reaches its peak in the month of August.

== Demographics ==
Population census of Buruanga
Year	Pop.	±% p.a.
1903	6,120	—
1918	8,050	+1.84%
1939	11,351	+1.65%
1948	12,514	+1.09%
1960	8,393	−3.27%
1970	9,291	+1.02%
1975	10,311	+2.11%
1980	10,764	+0.86%
1990	12,653	+1.63%
1995	12,665	+0.02%
2000	15,077	+3.81%
2007	15,767	+0.62%
2010	16,962	+2.69%
2015	19,003	+2.19%
2020	19,357	+0.39%
2024	19,878	+0.64%
Source: Philippine Statistics Authority

In the 2024 census, Buruanga had a population of 19,878. The population density was 220 inhabitants per square kilometre (570/sq mi).

=== Languages ===
Aklanon is the dominant language of Buruanga. Kinaray-a is also spoken due to its proximity to Antique. Hiligaynon is also widely spoken and understood in the municipality.

== Economy ==
Poverty incidence of Buruanga (%)

Source: Philippine Statistics Authority

== Tourism ==
Despite its proximity to Boracay, one of the most popular tourist destinations in the Philippines, Buruanga sees very few tourists. Various scenic spots such as caves, waterfalls, beaches, hills, and mountain parks are found throughout the area such as the Hinugtan White Beach, Batason (Ariel's) Point, Langka Beach, Nasog Beach, Tuburan Baybay Beach, Tigis Beach/Falls, and Pagatpat Mangrove Park.

== Flora and fauna ==
The upland barangay of Tag-Osip contains a portion of the Northwest Panay Peninsula Natural Park which is contained within the municipalities of Buruanga, Malay, and Nabas in Aklan Province and Libertad and Pandan in Antique. The park is home to many important plant and animal species such as the Visayan leopard cat, the blue-necked parrot, the Visayan hornbill, and the roughneck monitor lizard.

In 2011, several researchers from the United States Peace Corps conducted various biological assessments along the Buruanga coastline. It was found that Buruanga hosts 4 different species of mangroves including large tracts of nypa found in the barangays of Alegria, Balusbos, Poblacion, and Santander. Other species including pagatpat, bakawan, and piyapi are concentrated in Pagatpat Mangrove Park in barangay Panilongan with a few trees in spotted areas in barangay Santander. Buruanga also is home to 5 different species of seagrass identified including Cymodocea rotundata, Cymodocea serrulata, Halodule pinifolia, Halophila ovalis and Thalassia hemprichii.

== Education ==
The Buruanga Schools District Office governs all educational institutions within the municipality. It oversees the management and operations of all private and public, from primary to secondary schools.

=== Primary and elementary schools ===
- Alegria Elementary School
- Bagongbayan Elementary School
- Balusbos Primary School
- Bel-is Elementary School
- Buruanga Elementary School
- Cabugao Primary School
- Katipunan Elementary School
- Mayapay Elementary School (Mayapay Primary School)
- Pepe Elementary School (Pepe Primary School)
- Sammba Formation Center
- Santander Elementary School
- Tabungyan Elementary School
- Tag-osip Elementary School
- Tigum Elementary School

=== Secondary schools ===
- Buruanga Academy
- Buruanga National High School
- Buruanga Vocational School
- Habana Integrated School
