= Malinao, Aklan =

Municipality in Aklan, Philippines

Malinao
- Municipality
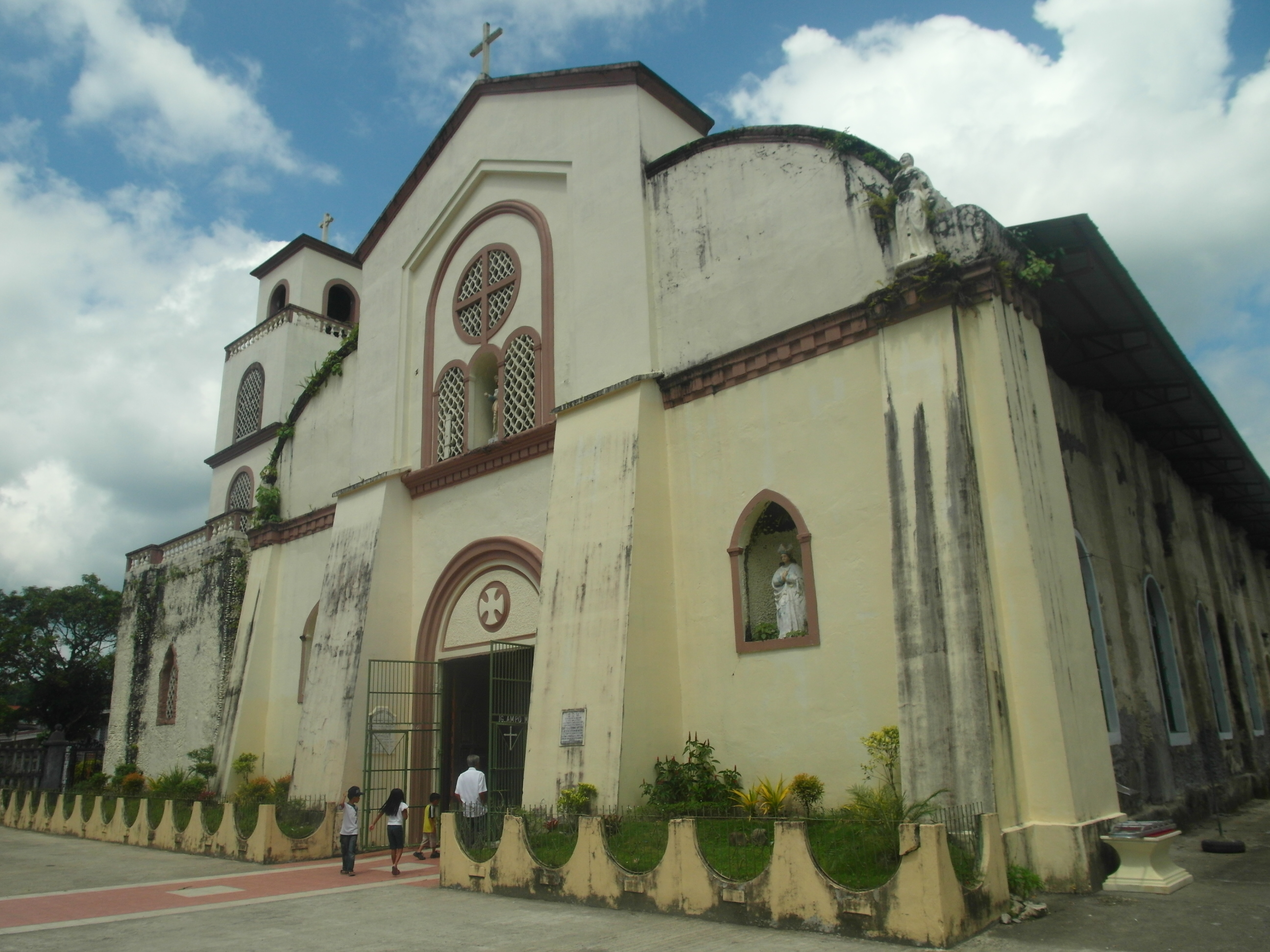
- Church of Malinao

- Flag Seal

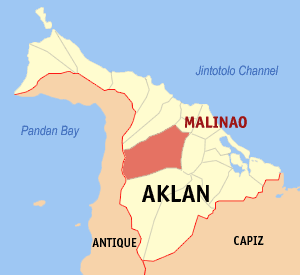
- Map of Aklan with Malinao highlighted
- Interactive map of Malinao
- Location within the Philippines
- Coordinates: 11°38′35″N 122°18′26″E
- Country: Philippines
- Region: Western Visayas
- Province: Aklan
- District: 2nd district
- Founded: 1796
- Barangays: 23 (see Barangays)

Government
  - Type: Sangguniang Bayan
  - Mayor: Josephine I. Iquiña
  - Vice Mayor: Wilbert Ariel I. Igoy
  - Representative: Teodorico T. Haresco Jr.
  - Municipal Council: Members: Gregorio V. Imperial Jr.; Ricardo C. Ibarreta; Christian Amado D. Ilio; Eleanor G. Agustino; Junito I. Iscala; Tsaldariz D. Ildesa; Raul R. Quinisio; Frederick I. Rey
  - Electorate: 16,278 voters (2025)

Area
  - Total: 186.01 km^{2} (71.82 sq mi)
- Elevation: 167 m (548 ft)
- Highest elevation: 1,274 m (4,180 ft)
- Lowest elevation: 0 m (0 ft)

Population (2024 census)
  - Total: 24,971
  - Density: 134.25/km^{2} (347.69/sq mi)
  - Households: 6,093

Economy
  - Income class: 3rd municipal income class
  - Poverty incidence: 11.46% (2023)
  - Revenue: ₱ 160.2 million (2024)
  - Assets: ₱ 594.6 million (2024)
  - Expenditure: ₱ 127.8 million (2024)
  - Liabilities: ₱ 52.39 million (2024)

Service provider
  - Electricity: Aklan Electric Cooperative (AKELCO)
- Time zone: UTC+8 (PST)
- ZIP code: 5606
- PSGC: 060413000
- IDD : area code: +63 (0)36
- Native languages: Aklanon; Hiligaynon; Tagalog

Malinao, officially the Municipality of Malinao (Aklanon: Banwa it Malinao; Hiligaynon: Banwa sang Malinao; Tagalog: Bayan ng Malinao), is a municipality in the province of Aklan, Philippines. According to the 2024 census, it has a population of 24,971 people.

It is known for its traditional nigo, a type of winnowing basket widely used in rice farming. Locals use it to dry grains in the sun and to sort rice from the chaff.

== History ==
Once an arrabal of the town of Banga to the east, Malinao's town leaders in the mid-18th century were able to submit a petition of separation direct, to Manila that was approved. In addition, Malinao rose to prominence in Philippine history during the struggle against colonial rule under Spain at the end of the 19th century. Candido Iban, a resident of Malinao, was a member of the inner circle of the original Katipuneros, directly under Andres Bonifacio.

The people of Malinao are mainly of Malay stock. Aklanons are believed to be descendants of the settlers who fled the oppressive rule of Makatunaw, Sultan of Brunei. Led by Datu Puti, ten datus settled in the plains of the island of Panay. The colonization by the Spaniards, the trading by the Chinese have infused new blood to the original Malay race into what are now the people of Malinao.

There is no record of the history of Malinao until the 18th century. By this time, the area of what is now Malinao was part of the adjacent municipality of Banga. The Poblacion of Banga then was the Poblacion of Malinao today. In 1792, however, the town authorities transferred the Poblacion of Banga across the Aklan River at the foot of Manduyog Hill where it is now located.

Some prominent families chose to remain in the former settlement, which was later reduced to a barrio and named Malinao. The name was derived from the placid river that flows through the western and southern portions of the area before emptying into the Aklan River.

The people who remained in Malinao led by Don Juan Nepomuceno agitated to separate the lands west of the Aklan River to form a new town with Malinao as its poblacion.

Malinao as a municipality came into being in the year 1796 with Don Casimiro Barrera as its first gobernadorcillo.

Little written history is known of Malinao in its early existence, except for church records on baptism which starts on the year 1796, the same year Malinao became a town. The Spanish decree on change family names for easy identification of inhabitants led to the assignment of the initial letter 'Y'/ 'I' for families originating from Malinao. The 1818 Spanish census showed that there were 1,487 native families and 11 Spanish-Filipino families flourishing here.

By the close of the 19th century, the political, economic and even the physical structure of Malinao conform to the classical colonial and feudal set-up existing throughout Christian Philippines. The layout of the Poblacion follows the classical Spanish town plan of the church facing the municipio with the plaza in between and streets laid out in grid pattern. The principalia partook of choice residential lots around the plaza. Their importance and influence reflected in the proximity of their lots to the center of power.

There was no concentration of land holdings by few families, unlike in other areas of the country. Original families in Malinao have their own pieces of land to work on. The land west of the Aklan River, because of its topography, must have escaped the encomienderos and hacienderos in the early part of Spanish colonization.

Despite its seeming ordinariness and unimportance in the national or provincial scheme of things, Malinao rose in prominence during the struggle against colonial rule at the end of the 19th century.

A native of Lilo-an, Malinao, Candido Iban was a member of the inner circle of the original Katipuneros directly under Andres Bonifacio. Candido Iban was the first overseas contract worker from Malinao, diving for pearls in Australia. As luck would have it, he won a considerable sum in a lottery and came back to Manila. He was befriended by Procopio Bonifacio, the brother of Andres, and was inducted as a Katipunero by Andres in the caves of Montalban. The first printing press of the Katipunan was paid for the lottery winnings of Candido Iban.

In 1897, Candido Iban and Francisco Castillo were sent to Aklan to organize the Katipunan in the Visayas. Barrio Lilo-an became the base of the katipunan. And in 1897, believing that the time was ripe for the start of the revolution, eighty-two (82) Katipuneros from Lilo-an marched to the Poblacion to persuade the local authorities to join the revolution. The uprising failed and the leaders captured. Candido Iban, Benito Iban and Gabino Yonsal were among the 19 Martyrs of Aklan executed by the Spanish authorities on March 23, 1897.

A monument of Candido Iban and the failed uprising called El Levantamiento de los 82 de Lilo-an stands prominently beside the town hall.

When the Japanese Imperial Army invaded the country during World War II, young men from Malinao were among the first to organize the guerrilla movement in this part of the country. During the Marcos dictatorship, many young Malinaonons took up arms to fight it.

== Geography ==
Malinao is located in the geographic centre of the province, at 11°38′35″N 122°18′26″E. It is 14 kilometres (8.7 mi) from the provincial capital, Kalibo.

According to the Philippine Statistics Authority, the municipality has a land area of 186.01 square kilometres (71.82 sq mi) constituting 10.21% of the 1,821.42-square-kilometre- (703.25 sq mi) total area of Aklan.

=== Climate ===
Climate data for Makato, Aklan
Month	Jan	Feb	Mar	Apr	May	Jun	Jul	Aug	Sep	Oct	Nov	Dec	Year
Mean daily maximum °C (°F)	28 (82)	29 (84)	30 (86)	32 (90)	32 (90)	31 (88)	30 (86)	30 (86)	29 (84)	29 (84)	29 (84)	28 (82)	30 (86)
Mean daily minimum °C (°F)	23 (73)	22 (72)	23 (73)	24 (75)	25 (77)	25 (77)	25 (77)	24 (75)	25 (77)	24 (75)	24 (75)	23 (73)	24 (75)
Average precipitation mm (inches)	47 (1.9)	33 (1.3)	39 (1.5)	48 (1.9)	98 (3.9)	150 (5.9)	169 (6.7)	147 (5.8)	163 (6.4)	172 (6.8)	118 (4.6)	80 (3.1)	1,264 (49.8)
Average rainy days	11.4	8.2	9.3	9.7	19.1	25.6	27.4	25.5	25.5	25.2	18.5	14.5	219.9
Source: Meteoblue

=== Barangays ===
Malinao, Aklan Map Image

Malinao is politically subdivided into 23 barangays. Each barangay consists of puroks and some have sitios.

PSGC	Barangay	Population			±% p.a.	
		2024		2010		
060413001	Banaybanay	3.7%	919	1,007	▾	−0.63%
060413002	Biga-a	3.5%	879	805	▴	0.61%
060413003	Bulabud	6.2%	1,551	1,764	▾	−0.89%
060413004	Cabayugan	4.9%	1,228	1,260	▾	−0.18%
060413005	Capataga	0.2%	40	129	▾	−7.81%
060413006	Cogon	2.0%	491	419	▴	1.11%
060413007	Dangcalan	2.7%	679	723	▾	−0.44%
060413008	Kinalangay Nuevo	3.9%	968	952	▴	0.12%
060413009	Kinalangay Viejo	8.2%	2,043	1,871	▴	0.61%
060413010	Lilo-an	5.8%	1,437	1,478	▾	−0.20%
060413011	Malandayon	3.5%	876	767	▴	0.93%
060413012	Manhanip	4.6%	1,149	1,177	▾	−0.17%
060413013	Navitas	4.7%	1,170	1,290	▾	−0.68%
060413014	Osman	2.8%	691	715	▾	−0.24%
060413015	Poblacion	6.0%	1,505	1,660	▾	−0.68%
060413016	Rosario	7.6%	1,889	2,199	▾	−1.05%
060413017	San Dimas	3.5%	873	892	▾	−0.15%
060413018	San Ramon	3.8%	940	893	▴	0.36%
060413019	San Roque	5.6%	1,406	1,413	▾	−0.03%
060413020	Sipac	1.7%	417	522	▾	−1.55%
060413021	Sugnod	2.0%	498	476	▴	0.31%
060413022	Tambuan	4.7%	1,163	1,346	▾	−1.01%
060413023	Tigpalas	1.5%	382	350	▴	0.61%
	Total		24,971	24,108	▴	0.24%

== Demographics ==
Population census of Malinao
Year	Pop.	±% p.a.
1903	5,027	—
1918	8,230	+3.34%
1939	10,768	+1.29%
1948	11,000	+0.24%
1960	12,987	+1.39%
1970	14,947	+1.41%
1975	16,483	+1.98%
1980	18,117	+1.91%
1990	20,180	+1.08%
1995	21,509	+1.20%
2000	23,699	+2.10%
2007	23,921	+0.13%
2010	24,108	+0.28%
2015	23,194	−0.73%
2020	24,517	+1.17%
2024	24,971	+0.44%
Source: Philippine Statistics Authority

In the 2024 census, Malinao had a population of 24,971 people. The population density was 130 inhabitants per square kilometre (340/sq mi).

== Economy ==
Poverty incidence of Malinao (%)

Source: Philippine Statistics Authority

== Education ==
The Malinao Schools District Office governs all educational institutions within the municipality. It oversees the management and operations of all private and public, from primary to secondary schools.

=== Primary and elementary schools ===
- Angeles Ibardolasa Elementary School
- Banay-banay Primary School
- Bulabud Elementary School
- Cabayugan Elementary School
- Cogon Elementary School
- Dangcalan Elementary School
- Early Learners Preschool
- Kinalangay Nuevo Primary School
- Lilo-an Elementary School
- Malandayon Primary School
- Malinao Elementary School
- Manhanip Primary School
- Navitas Elementary School
- Osman Elementary School
- Rosario Elementary School
- San Dimas Elementary School
- San Ramon Elementary School (San Ramon Elementary School)
- Sipac Elementary School
- St. Joseph Academy
- Sugnod Elementary School
- Tambuan Elementary School
- Tigpalas Primary School

=== Secondary schools ===
- Ciriaco L. Icamina Sr. National High School
- Lilo-an National High School
- Kinalangay Viejo Integrated School
- Malinao Sch. For Phil. Craftsmen
- Navitas National High School
- Rosario National High School
- San Roque Integrated School
