= Makato =

Municipality in Aklan, Philippines

Makato Taft
- Municipality
- Municipality of Makato
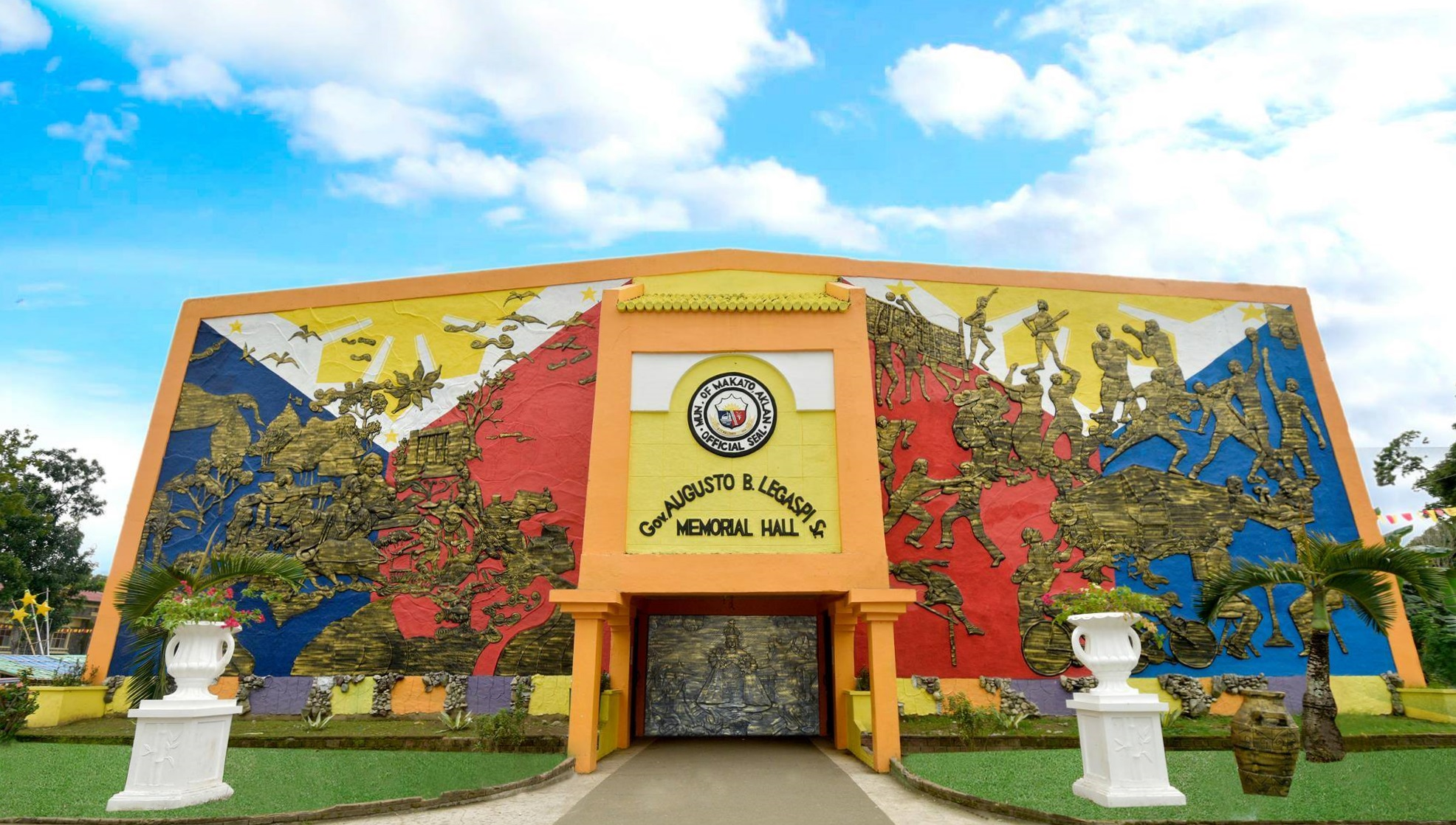
- Makato Sports Complex

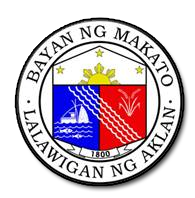
- Flag Seal
- Nickname: Blooming Makato
- Motto: Hala Bira sa Progreso
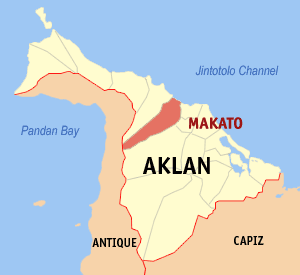
- Map of Aklan with Makato highlighted
- Interactive map of Makato
- Location within the Philippines
- Coordinates: 11°42′43″N 122°17′32″E
- Country: Philippines
- Region: Western Visayas
- Province: Aklan
- District: 2nd district
- Barangays: 18 (see Barangays)

Government
  - Type: Sangguniang Bayan
  - Mayor: Ramon Anselmo Martin D. Legaspi III
  - Vice Mayor: Leoncito Y. Mationg
  - Representative: Teodorico T. Haresco Jr.
  - Municipal Council: Members: Nilo M. Amboboyog; Marlene Mae Blaire T. Igham; Nerli F. dela Cena; Randy R. Vargas; Rhine I. Roldan; Abencio Honeyboy P. Torres III; Leoncito Y. Mationg; Steven M. Tejada
  - Electorate: 23,128 voters (2025)

Area
  - Total: 64.60 km^{2} (24.94 sq mi)
- Elevation: 52 m (171 ft)
- Highest elevation: 1,070 m (3,510 ft)
- Lowest elevation: 0 m (0 ft)

Population (2024 census)
  - Total: 30,650
  - Density: 474.5/km^{2} (1,229/sq mi)
  - Households: 7,394

Economy
  - Income class: 3rd municipal income class
  - Poverty incidence: 7.96% (2023)
  - Revenue: ▲ ₱95,616,098.46 (2019)
  - Appropriations: ▲ ₱98,469,786.02 (2019)
  - Assets: ▲ ₱245,439,688.82 (2019)
  - Liabilities: ▲ ₱42,440,665,26 (2019)
  - Expenditure: ▲ ₱87,558,602.68 (2019)
  - Obligation's: ▲ ₱98,469,786.02 (2019)

Service provider
  - Electricity: Aklan Electric Cooperative (AKELCO)
- Time zone: UTC+8 (PST)
- ZIP code: 5611
- PSGC: 060411000
- IDD : area code: +63 (0)36
- Native languages: Aklanon; Hiligaynon; Tagalog
- Patron saint: Santo Niño
- Website: www.makato.gov.ph

Makato, officially the Municipality of Makato (Aklanon: Banwa it Makato; Hiligaynon: Banwa sang Makato; Tagalog: Bayan ng Makato), is a municipality in the province of Aklan, Philippines. According to the 2024 census, it has a population of 30,650 people.

The town is the home of the Ati-Atihan Festival, a historic celebration that attracts devotees from across the Philippines and abroad to honor Sto. Niño through vibrant cultural and religious activities.

== History ==
Established in the thirteenth century, the town’s name had been acquired by accident. Thinking that the Spaniards came to ask the route along the river, the native answered “Makato” which meant “that way”. The Spaniards recorded the name Makato in 1800, thinking it was the name of the town. In 1901, the town merged with Tangalan to form the new municipality of Taft, named after the then Governor-General of the Philippines and future United States President, William Howard Taft. But in 1917, it was reverted to its former name. In 1948, the arrabal of Tangalan, comprising the barrios of Tondog, Jawili, Dumatad, Afga, Baybay, Dapdap, Pudyot, Tagas, Tamalagon, Panayakan, Vivo, Lanipga, Napatag and Tamoko, was separated from Makato to form the municipality of Tangalan.

== Geography ==
Makato is located at 11°42′43″N 122°17′32″E. It is 8 kilometers (5.0 mi) from Kalibo, the provincial capital.

According to the Philippine Statistics Authority, the municipality has a land area of 64.60 square kilometers (24.94 sq mi) constituting 3.55% of the 1,821.42-square-kilometer (703.25 sq mi) total area of Aklan.

=== Barangays ===
Makato is politically subdivided into 18 barangays. Each barangay consists of puroks and some have sitios.

PSGC	Barangay	Population			±% p.a.	
		2024		2010		
060411001	Agbalogo	3.7%	1,127	990	▴	0.90%
060411002	Aglucay	1.8%	557	521	▴	0.47%
060411003	Alibagon	2.1%	641	543	▴	1.16%
060411004	Bagong Barrio	1.6%	487	429	▴	0.88%
060411005	Baybay	6.8%	2,077	1,916	▴	0.56%
060411006	Cabatanga	4.1%	1,246	1,144	▴	0.59%
060411007	Cajilo	4.7%	1,446	1,294	▴	0.77%
060411008	Calangcang	5.6%	1,715	1,701	▴	0.06%
060411009	Calimbajan	6.7%	2,068	1,855	▴	0.76%
060411010	Castillo	3.1%	956	791	▴	1.32%
060411011	Cayangwan	6.9%	2,125	2,058	▴	0.22%
060411012	Dumga	7.1%	2,170	2,107	▴	0.20%
060411013	Libang	4.6%	1,401	1,561	▾	−0.75%
060411014	Mantiguib	6.3%	1,921	1,778	▴	0.54%
060411015	Poblacion	10.7%	3,288	3,172	▴	0.25%
060411016	Tibiawan	2.8%	869	785	▴	0.71%
060411017	Tina	4.0%	1,223	1,094	▴	0.78%
060411018	Tugas	6.3%	1,945	1,722	▴	0.85%
	Total		30,650	25,461	▴	1.30%

=== Climate ===
Climate data for Makato, Aklan
Month	Jan	Feb	Mar	Apr	May	Jun	Jul	Aug	Sep	Oct	Nov	Dec	Year
Mean daily maximum °C (°F)	28 (82)	29 (84)	30 (86)	32 (90)	32 (90)	31 (88)	30 (86)	30 (86)	29 (84)	29 (84)	29 (84)	28 (82)	30 (86)
Mean daily minimum °C (°F)	23 (73)	22 (72)	23 (73)	24 (75)	25 (77)	25 (77)	25 (77)	24 (75)	25 (77)	24 (75)	24 (75)	23 (73)	24 (75)
Average precipitation mm (inches)	47 (1.9)	33 (1.3)	39 (1.5)	48 (1.9)	98 (3.9)	150 (5.9)	169 (6.7)	147 (5.8)	163 (6.4)	172 (6.8)	118 (4.6)	80 (3.1)	1,264 (49.8)
Average rainy days	11.4	8.2	9.3	9.7	19.1	25.6	27.4	25.5	25.5	25.2	18.5	14.5	219.9
Source: Meteoblue

== Demographics ==
Population census of Makato
Year	Pop.	±% p.a.
1903	5,289	—
1918	11,661	+5.41%
1939	15,526	+1.37%
1948	9,939	−4.84%
1960	11,951	+1.55%
1970	13,287	+1.06%
1975	14,972	+2.42%
1980	16,732	+2.25%
1990	19,230	+1.40%
1995	21,955	+2.51%
2000	22,777	+0.79%
2007	25,043	+1.32%
2010	25,461	+0.60%
2015	27,262	+1.31%
2020	29,717	+1.83%
2024	30,650	+0.74%
Source: Philippine Statistics Authority

In the 2024 census, Makato had a population of 30,650 people. The population density was 470 inhabitants per square kilometer (1,200/sq mi).

== Economy ==
Poverty incidence of Makato (%)

Source: Philippine Statistics Authority

== Religion ==
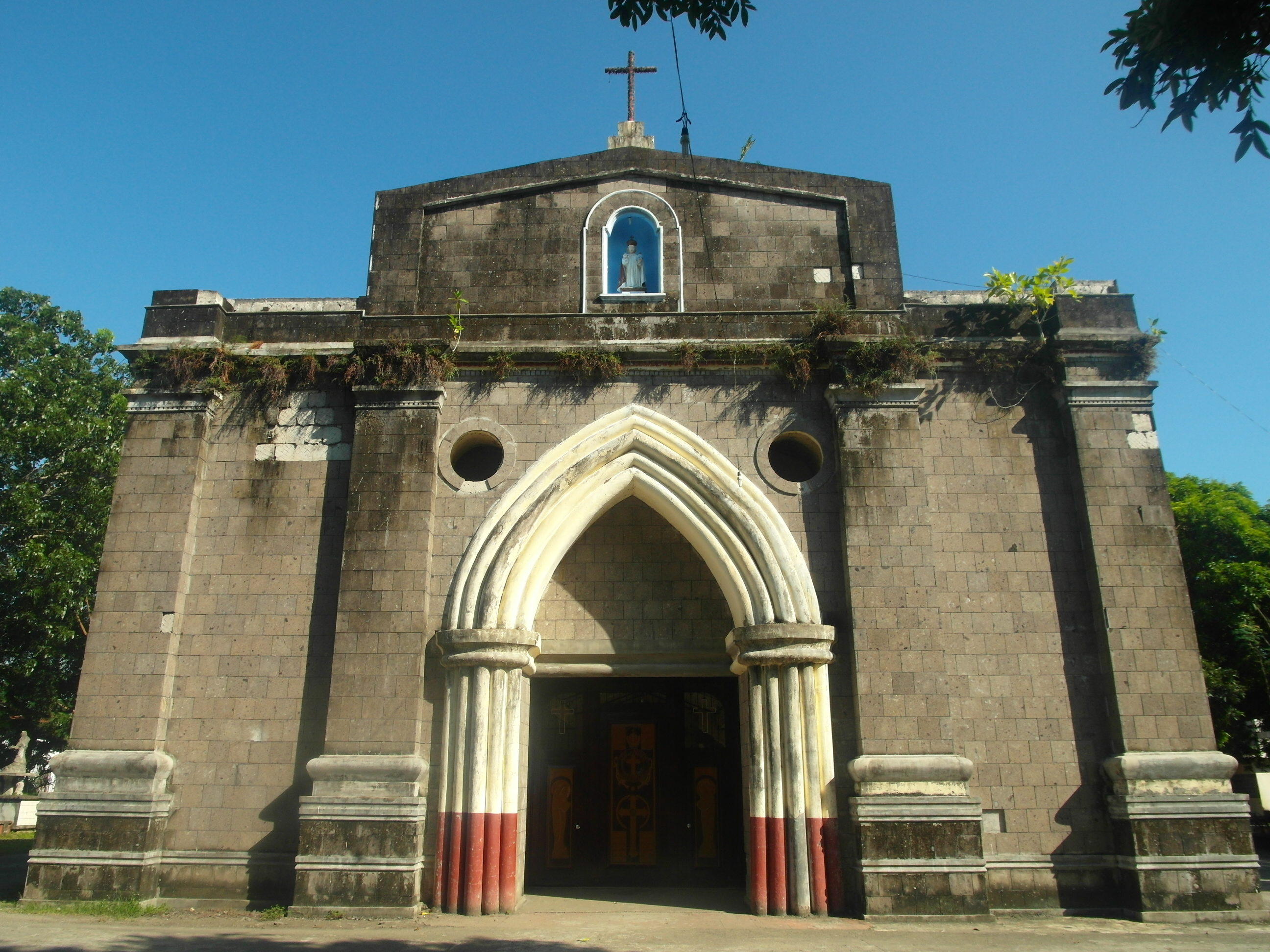
Holy Child Jesus Parish Church

Domicile of the Santo Niño and Ati-Atihan Festival known throughout the province and a week ahead of Kalibo, Makato has been celebrating the “Mother of all Philippine Festivals” in admiration of the Holy Child.

== Government ==
=== Elected officials ===
Mayor: Ramon Anselmo Martin D. Legaspi III

Vice Mayor: Leoncito Y. Mationg

Sangguniang Bayan Members:

- Nilo M. Amboboyog
- Marlene Mae Blaire T. Igham
- Nerli F. dela Cena
- Randy R. Vargas
- Rhine I. Roldan
- Abencio Honeyboy P. Torres III
- Leoncito Y. Mationg
- Steven M. Tejada

Liga ng Barangay (LnB): Shirly M. Lagradante

Sangguniang Kabataan Federation: Dina Mae Taladro

== Infrastructure ==
The Aklan Sports Complex, opened in 2010, is located here in Makato. It hosted the 2010 Western Visayas Regional Athletic Association (WVRAA) Meet.

== Education ==
The Makato Schools District Office governs all educational institutions within the municipality. It oversees the management and operations of all private and public, from primary to secondary schools.

=== Primary and elementary schools ===
- Alibagon Primary School
- Cabatanga Elementary School
- Cajilo Elementary School
- Calangcang Elementary School
- Calimbajan-Tina Elementary School
- Castillo Elementary School
- Cayangwan Elementary School
- Christ the King Kindergarten
- Col. D.U. Tenazas Memorial School
- Dioscoro T. Tejada Elementary School (Agbalogo)
- Libang Elementary School
- Little Angels Montessorie School
- Mantiguib Elementary School
- Quirico T. Tabanera Elementary School
- Tibiawan Elementary School
- Tugas-Dumga Elementary School

=== Secondary schools ===
- Aklan Central Institute
- Anselmo B. Legaspi National High School
- Bagong Barrio Integrated School
- Baybay-Alibagon Integrated School
- Dr. Ramon B. Legaspi Sr. National High School
- Makato Integrated School
