= Ibajay =

Municipality in Aklan, Philippines

- Municipality
- Municipality of Ibajay
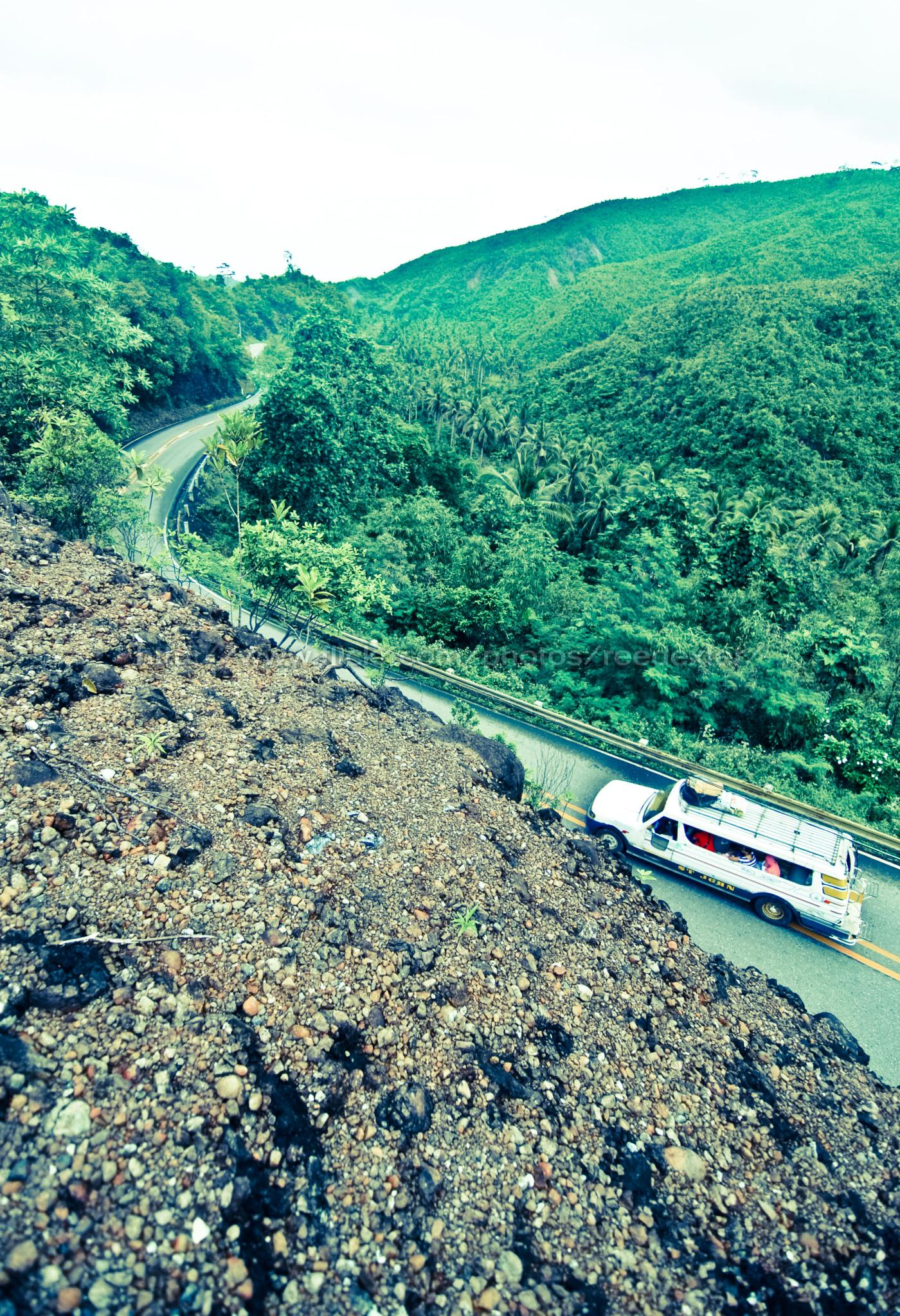
- Ibajay Campo Verde Road

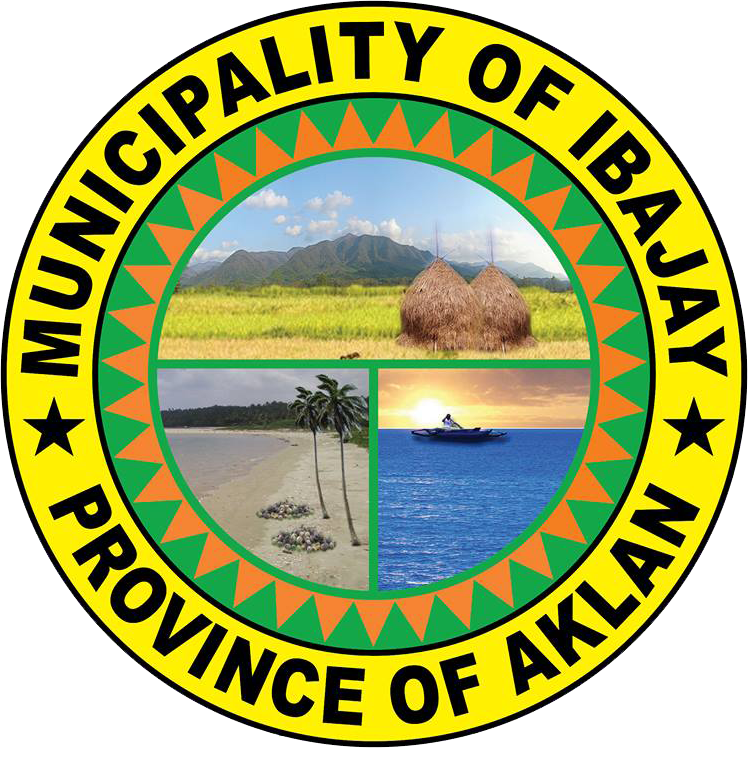
- Flag Seal

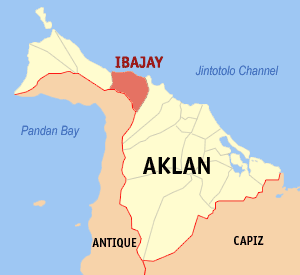
- Map of Aklan with Ibajay highlighted
- Interactive map of Ibajay
- Location within the Philippines
- Coordinates: 11°49′16″N 122°09′42″E
- Country: Philippines
- Region: Western Visayas
- Province: Aklan
- District: 2nd district
- Barangays: 35 (see Barangays)

Government
  - Type: Sangguniang Bayan
  - Mayor: Jose Miguel M. Miraflores
  - Vice Mayor: Nestor Francisco M. Inocencio
  - Representative: Teodorico T. Haresco Jr.
  - Municipal Council: Members: Hazzi S. Ilinon; Joy Clarisse R. Briones; Rijan Ascano; Nino Aguirre; Mihrel S. Senatin; Rita S. Magbiray; Lowell S. Fernandez
  - Electorate: 34,003 voters (2025)

Area
  - Total: 158.90 km^{2} (61.35 sq mi)
- Elevation: 63 m (207 ft)
- Highest elevation: 913 m (2,995 ft)
- Lowest elevation: 0 m (0 ft)

Population (2024 census)
  - Total: 53,399
  - Density: 336.05/km^{2} (870.38/sq mi)
  - Households: 12,595

Economy
  - Income class: 1st municipal income class
  - Poverty incidence: 8.7% (2023)
  - Revenue: ₱ 251.2 million (2024)
  - Assets: ₱ 745 million (2024)
  - Expenditure: ₱ 221.3 million (2024)
  - Liabilities: ₱ 160.7 million (2024)

Service provider
  - Electricity: Aklan Electric Cooperative (AKELCO)
- Time zone: UTC+8 (PST)
- ZIP code: 5613
- PSGC: 060406000
- IDD : area code: +63 (0)36
- Native languages: Aklanon; Hiligaynon; Tagalog

Ibajay, officially known as the Municipality of Ibajay (Aklanon: Banwa it Ibajay; Hiligaynon: Banwa sang Ibajay; Tagalog: Bayan ng Ibajay), is a municipality in the province of Aklan, Philippines. During the creation of Aklan Province in 1956, Ibajay was its biggest municipality in terms of population. According to the 2024 census, it has a population of 53,399 people.

In 2017, the town was recognized as the top performing municipality in the region for its strong work on nutrition programs.

== History ==
=== Under the Spanish "Panay Y Bayjay" ===
The autonomous barangays that the Spaniards encountered in Cebu could barely provide enough food for their needs. Miguel López de Legazpi had to move his camp, sailing from Cebu to Panay Island in 1569.

Desiring to explore the island for food and spice, Legazpi ordered some of his men to move further on the island until they ran out of bread to eat. Tired and hungry, the Spaniards solicited something to eat from the natives. To their surprise, they were given a container full of brown rice. When the Spaniards asked the natives what kind of rice they passed, they politely replied, "ba-hay," meaning third-class rice. In recognition of the generosity of the natives, they named the place "Panay y bahay"—the place in Panay where there was, and the Spaniards were given "ba-hay" rice.

The word Ibajay was initially written with the capital letter Y. It was only in 1902 that an American supervising teacher made the change from Ybajay to Ibajay because of the preference for the English alphabet and the difficulty of the Americans in spelling the word.

Spanish authorities' first seat of government was in Boboc-on, Barangay Naile, in the 17th century. The system of government the Spaniards established was the encomienda. They ruled the natives by control of a royal grant from the King of Spain. The King of Spain appointed an encomiendero as the overseer, with the Governadorcillo, Cabeza Mayores and Cabezas de Barangay as subordinates.

In the early part of the Spanish dominion, the barangay was the primary government structure in Ibajay. The Chieftain collected tributes from his sinakupan (people) and turned over the collections to the encomienderos. Later on, however, the barangay government was reorganized again into makeups. Each has to elect a governadorcillo. The governadorcillo was elected by the votes of selected married male natives called principales. The candidate must be recommended and nominated by the community or the encomiendero.

From the perspective of the native inhabitants, the village chief functioned primarily as an administrative leader rather than an absolute ruler, unlike the system later imposed by the Spaniards. His authority was constrained by established customs and traditional practices that governed the community. Although the position eventually became hereditary, it was originally earned through demonstrated skill and valor—qualities essential to the survival and well-being of the group.

Dismayed by the exploitative nature of the government system and their unwillingness to accept the Spanish sovereignty, Chieftains Hangoe, Sandok, and Kabatak fled to the vast mountains of Panay. Still, the Spanish continued their colonization. The natives could not do anything but accept the dictum of the Spaniards to survive and go on with their lives.

The first native to hold public office in Sitio Boboc-on as governadorcillo was Don Francisco Dalisay, elected by the principales in 1673. However, Muslim pirates and bandits from Mindanao often pestered the town. Hence, in 1786, Governor Juan Sabino moved the seat of government to Sitio Maganhup, a vast land between now Barangay Naile and Barangay San Jose but the new site proved unsafe from the continued beleaguering of the lawless elements. Furthermore, it was not ideal for the natives because it was far from the farms they cultivated.

For the second time in 1792, Governor Jose Garcia transferred the seat of government to Sitio Adiango, now part of Barangay Laguinbanua. It stayed there for 11 years. Captain Josef Flores moved the seat of government again to its present location. By the decree issued by the Governador of the Philippine Islands, watchtowers were fortified along the shorelines to warn and protect against bandits and crooks. A church was also created. The 1818 Spanish census showed that there were 1,268 native families and 30 Spanish-Filipino families flourishing here.

=== Revolution and American influence ===
The Philippine Revolution broke out in the later part of the 19th century. Under the leadership of Gen. Ananias Diokno, the Tagalog Insurrectos defeated and drove away the Spaniards hiding behind the buttress of the Catholic Convent in Poblacion.

The Philippine flag was hoisted at the town square for the first time. In 1879, Don Ciriaco Tirol y Seneres was appointed acting Capitan Municipal until 1898. The following year, under the revolutionary government of Gen. Emilio Aguinaldo, Don Antonio Manikan was elected Capitan Municipal—the position he held until 1901.

In 1902, The Americans reorganized the local government of Ibajay. They changed the designation of the head of the town from Captain Municipal to Municipal President. This year, the city's official name was changed from Ybajay to Ibajay.

The first municipal President elected was Don Valintin Conanan. During his term, a cholera epidemic broke out in the Municipality of Ibajay. It snapped out so many lives. As a contingency, a new cemetery was opened near the Catholic Cemetery. It is now known as the Ibajay Municipal Cemetery.

In the year 1921, Catalino Solidum was appointed Municipal President. He held the position for only a year. Moises T. Solidum replaced him the following year until 1925. Tomas Bautista became the mayor of Ibajay from 1926 to 1928, while Jose S. Conanan from 1937 to 1940.

In 1941, Dr. Jose C. Miraflores became mayor until the outbreak of World War II. Ibajay, at that time, was razed to the ground by the Japanese troops. Many Ibayhanons suffered the painful consequences of the war. Also, the Guerilla Liberation Movement helped the Philippine forces become popular among the locals. Ibayhanon women formed the Ibajay Ladies Auxiliary War Relief Association (LAWRA) to raise funds and morale for the Revolutionary Army. From 1944 to 1945, many Filipino troops of the 6th, 61st and 62nd Infantry Division of the Philippine Commonwealth Army and the 6th Infantry Regiment of the Philippine Constabulary liberated the town of Ibajay, Aklan and helped Ibayhanon guerrilla groups and defeated Japanese troops at the end of World War II. Moreover, the local city government was established with Guillermo de los Reyes as acting municipal mayor. Moises T. Solidum later on, replaced him until 1946.

== Geography ==
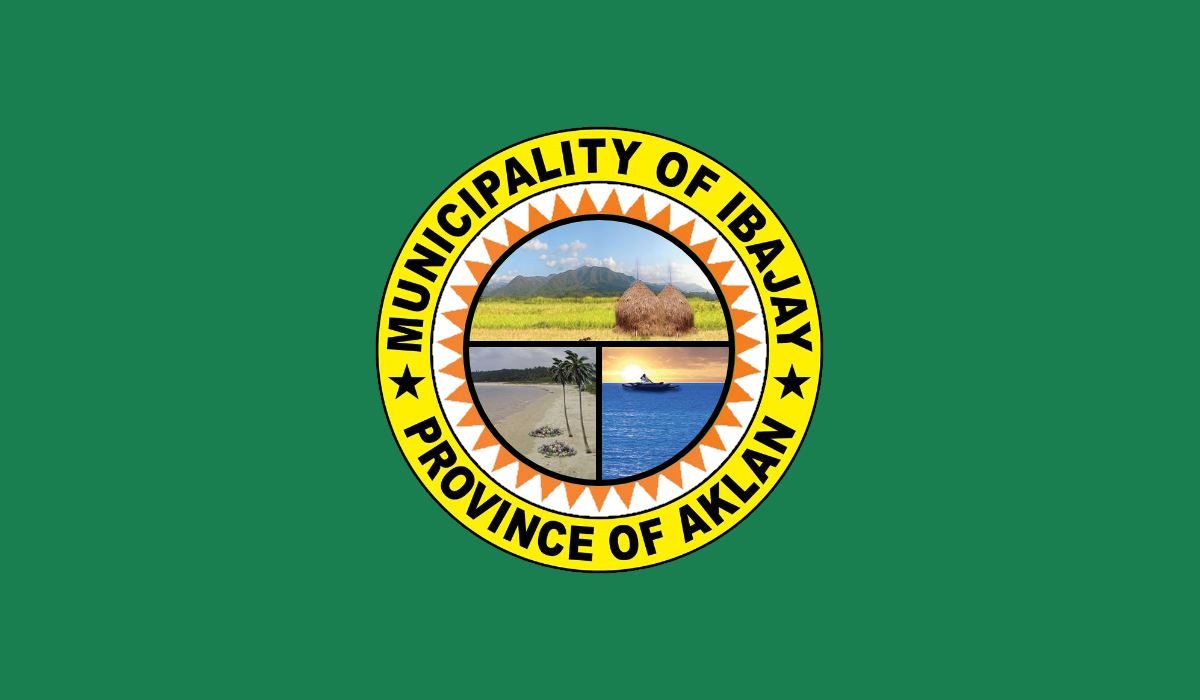
Variant flag of Ibajay

According to the Philippine Statistics Authority, the municipality has a land area of 158.90 square kilometres (61.35 sq mi), constituting 8.72% of the 1,821.42-square-kilometre- (703.25 sq mi) total area of Aklan.

Ibajay lies in the northwest section of Aklan province on Panay Island. It is bounded on the north by the Sibuyan Sea, east by Tangalan, west by Nabas, and south by Antique.

The distance from Kalibo, the capital of Aklan, is 34 kilometres (21 mi) and takes 45 minutes to one hour by road transport. Its road networks are composed of 16 kilometres (9.9 mi) of National Road, 32.918 kilometres (20.454 mi) of Provincial Roads, and 75.430 kilometres (46.870 mi) of Barangay Road.

=== Climate ===
Climate data for Ibajay, Aklan
Month	Jan	Feb	Mar	Apr	May	Jun	Jul	Aug	Sep	Oct	Nov	Dec	Year
Mean daily maximum °C (°F)	28 (82)	29 (84)	30 (86)	32 (90)	32 (90)	31 (88)	30 (86)	30 (86)	29 (84)	29 (84)	29 (84)	28 (82)	30 (86)
Mean daily minimum °C (°F)	23 (73)	22 (72)	23 (73)	24 (75)	25 (77)	25 (77)	25 (77)	24 (75)	24 (75)	24 (75)	24 (75)	23 (73)	24 (75)
Average precipitation mm (inches)	47 (1.9)	33 (1.3)	39 (1.5)	48 (1.9)	98 (3.9)	150 (5.9)	169 (6.7)	147 (5.8)	163 (6.4)	172 (6.8)	118 (4.6)	80 (3.1)	1,264 (49.8)
Average rainy days	11.4	8.2	9.3	9.7	19.1	25.6	27.4	25.5	25.5	25.2	18.5	14.5	219.9
Source: Meteoblue (Use with caution: this is modeled/calculated data, not measured locally.)

=== Barangays ===
Ibajay is politically subdivided into 35 barangays. Each barangay consists of puroks and some have sitios.

PSGC	Barangay	Population			±% p.a.	
		2024		2010		
060406001	Agbago	3.4%	1,826	1,857	▾	−0.12%
060406002	Agdugayan	2.3%	1,221	1,071	▴	0.91%
060406003	Antipolo	1.5%	817	727	▴	0.81%
060406004	Aparicio	1.7%	887	733	▴	1.32%
060406005	Aquino	5.8%	3,095	2,791	▴	0.71%
060406006	Aslum	2.7%	1,434	1,220	▴	1.12%
060406007	Bagacay	2.0%	1,077	949	▴	0.87%
060406008	Batuan	2.2%	1,186	1,059	▴	0.78%
060406009	Buenavista	0.9%	485	461	▴	0.35%
060406010	Bugtongbato	3.0%	1,577	1,281	▴	1.44%
060406011	Cabugao	0.4%	225	210	▴	0.48%
060406012	Capilijan	2.0%	1,060	974	▴	0.58%
060406013	Colongcolong	2.1%	1,137	1,030	▴	0.68%
060406014	Laguinbanua	6.0%	3,226	2,894	▴	0.75%
060406015	Mabusao	1.2%	661	631	▴	0.32%
060406016	Malindog	0.4%	198	187	▴	0.39%
060406017	Maloco	4.9%	2,635	2,581	▴	0.14%
060406018	Mina-a	1.3%	683	614	▴	0.73%
060406019	Monlaque	1.7%	899	808	▴	0.74%
060406020	Naile	4.7%	2,517	2,325	▴	0.55%
060406021	Naisud	5.7%	3,055	2,838	▴	0.51%
060406022	Naligusan	1.6%	833	758	▴	0.65%
060406023	Ondoy	4.7%	2,484	2,294	▴	0.55%
060406024	Poblacion	5.5%	2,944	2,804	▴	0.34%
060406025	Polo	2.1%	1,095	1,019	▴	0.50%
060406026	Regador	3.7%	1,998	1,904	▴	0.33%
060406027	Rivera	0.4%	240	199	▴	1.30%
060406028	Rizal	2.4%	1,307	1,272	▴	0.19%
060406029	San Isidro	3.2%	1,704	1,609	▴	0.40%
060406030	San Jose	3.8%	2,048	1,684	▴	1.35%
060406031	Santa Cruz	2.4%	1,278	1,142	▴	0.78%
060406032	Tagbaya	3.3%	1,761	1,721	▴	0.16%
060406033	Tul-ang	1.6%	829	628	▴	1.93%
060406034	Unat	1.5%	820	741	▴	0.70%
060406035	Yawan	0.6%	322	263	▴	1.40%
	Total		53,399	45,279	▴	1.14%

== Demographics ==
Population census of Ibajay
Year	Pop.	±% p.a.
1903	14,774	—
1918	17,542	+1.15%
1939	22,740	+1.24%
1948	24,086	+0.64%
1960	25,305	+0.41%
1970	27,129	+0.70%
1975	30,343	+2.27%
1980	31,214	+0.57%
1990	35,640	+1.34%
1995	36,184	+0.28%
2000	39,643	+1.98%
2007	42,742	+1.04%
2010	45,279	+2.12%
2015	49,564	+1.74%
2020	52,364	+1.16%
2024	53,399	+0.47%
Source: Philippine Statistics Authority

In the 2024 census, Ibajay had a population of 53,399. The population density was 340 inhabitants per square kilometre (880/sq mi).

Ibajay had a total population of 39,643 in the May 2000 census, with a calculated growth rate of 0.03%. The total number of households is 7,918, with an average household size of 5. At the 2010 census, the population had increased to 45,279 persons, a 14.2% increase since 2000.

== Economy ==
Poverty incidence of Ibajay (%)

Source: Philippine Statistics Authority

Ibajay is classified as a third municipality (based on income). Rice farming is the primary source of income. Coconut produce plays a significant article in export and processing. There are 12 stationary rice mills and 21 roving rice mills for the post-harvest needs of the farmers. There are 25 registered cooperatives, most of which are the Farmer's Multipurpose Cooperatives. Vegetable and livestock production are on a backyard scale. Fishing and fishpond production is done along the nearby coastal barangays. The Ibajay Public Market at the Poblacion is the centre of business and trade. Three barangay markets are located at Barangay Naile, Maloco and San Jose.

== Government ==
Mayors and their dates of office:

- Gavino C. Solidum (1946–1950)
- Napoleon Mijares (1952–1956)
- Maximo S. Masangcay (1957–1959)
- Francisco Salido (1960–1963)
- Roberto Q. Garcia (1964–1967)
- Fidel G. Candari (1968–1971)
- Florante M. Ascano (1971–1987)
- Florencio T. Miraflores (1988–1995)
- Pedro M. Garcia (1995–2001)
- Roberto M. Garcia Jr. (2001–2007)
- Ma. Lourdes M. Miraflores (2007–2016)
- Jose Enrique M. Miraflores (2016–2022)
- Jose Miguel M. Miraflores (2022–Present)

== Tourism ==
Name	Description	Barangay
Ibajay Ati-Ati Festival	A devotional celebration every fourth Sunday of January in the Heart of Western Aklan. This yearly religious event is observed as a mark of respect for the town’s patron saint Santo Niño. The festival is being symbolized by transferring the image of the Holy Child from where it was originally discovered to the church to be witnessed by the devoted Catholics. Other barangays in Ibajay have their celebration of Ati-ati Fiesta; On the second Sunday of January for Naile and Sta. Cruz and fourth Saturday of January for Maloco.	Poblacion
Katunggan it Ibajay Eco-Tourism Park	The Bugtongbato-Naisud basin (inland) mangrove boasts 28 mangrove species. It is the only mangrove community in the country that comprises 80% of the total 35 Philippine species. It has been identified and acknowledged by SEAFDEC-AQD as an ideal site for its various scientific researches on mangrove and aquaculture. With its high level of biodiversity, giant and century-old endemic mangrove species of natural growth will entice eco-tourists to explore what they think is impossible to discover. Three species studied and documented are in the red list vulnerable, nearly threatened and endangered.	Naisud and Bugtong-bato
Yawa-Yawa Festival	(Niños Inocentes) Every 28th of December	Maloco and other remote barangays
Sniba-a Falls	One of Ibajay’s waterfalls is Snibaa Falls, a fine veil of white reachable after a brief mountain hike. Its cold waters can recharge you after a day’s worth of exploring.	Aparicio
Nawidwid Falls and Su-ag Falls	Two of Ibajay’s best waterfalls.	Mina-a
Campo Verde	Situated along the border of the municipalities of Tangalan and Ibajay, Campo Verde is 28 km west traveling distance from the capital town of Kalibo. Its altitude of 3,700 feet makes it ideal for retreats especially during summer. It is also known as the hikers’ paradise which abounds with thick tree plantations of green pines, mahogany, acacia, ipil-ipil, and butterfly trees that draws visitors to trek deeper into the woods.	Regador
Alejandro Melchor's Birthplace	Ibajay is where a renowned Filipino in history who was distinguished for his work on bridges. Alejandro Melchor (1900-1947) was a civil engineer, mathematician, and educator who served as Secretary of National Defense under President Manuel Quezon. But Melchor’s major claim to fame was designing the pontoon bridges recognized to have contributed much to winning the Second World War for the Allied Forces.	Aslum-Poblacion
Two Gabaldon Heritage School Buildings (DLRC Building and Ibajay Central School)	The Gabaldons are protected under Philippine law under Republic Act No. 11194 or the Gabaldon School Buildings Conservation Act. Under the law the "modification, alteration, destruction, demolition or relocation" of Gabaldon buildings are illegal. The particular legislation also designates the Gabaldons as cultural properties citing another legislation known as the Republic Act 10066 or the National Cultural Heritage Act of 2009. The law mandates local government units to adopt measures for the protection and conversation of Gabaldon buildings under their jurisdiction	Poblacion
Town Proper	Ruins of Old Ibajay Church, 19th Century Church and Convent, Town Hall & Plaza, World War II Memorial and 1930's Rizal Monument	Poblacion
Ibajay Beach	Covering the 10 shoreline barangays, Ibajay Beach stretches from Barangay Bugtongbato to Barangay Aquino. Its pristine blue crystal waters along the shorelines are suitable for picnics and swimming.	Bugtongbato to Aquino
Ibajay River	The massive Ibajay River, transversing the Municipality from the farthest barangay of Yawan to the mouth of the River at Poblacion, is pompous of its clear and surging waters which had created gigantic and mystic boulders along the way challenging bamboo rafters in shooting its rapids and dubious currents-offering great adventures for water sports enthusiasts and eco-tourists.	Yawan to Poblacion
Balinsayaw Rocky Mountain	The peak is a version of Mt. Maculot's famous Rockies except from the Taal Lake view	Mabusao
Paeantawan Mountain	The Paeantawan (a high place from where to look around) is a circular mountain with three peaks, a deep depression in the middle, and a narrow opening looking to the west. From the inside, it is like a bowl with uneven rim and a break on one side. From the highest peak, one can see the Sibuyan Sea, the Poblacion (municipal capital), Barangays Tagbaya and Agbago on the north; on the northeast and east, Barangays Laguinbanua, Bagacay, Batuan and Capilijan; on the south and west are groups of mountains one of which is Banderahan, the highest mountain peak in Barangay Santa Cruz. Anyone from as far as one and a half kilometers from Paeantawan can be observed with the unaided eyes. It was from the highest Paeantawan peak, garrisoned by the Japanese occupation forces and served as both observation and battery posts, that a Japanese sniper shot and killed a Catholic priest, Father Nicomedes Solidum Masangkay, a native of Santa Cruz, who was running along a creek below. Garison (from garrison) some 500 meters south of Paeantawan and slightly higher is reportedly the most destructive of all Japanese garrisons in Santa Cruz. From this peak, most of the effective sniper and machine gun fires poured into Santa Cruz and other places that can be seen from Paeantawan came from. Filipino guerrillas attempted to wrest control of Garison from the Japanese, but they failed. The Japanese did not leave, unobserved, until the Liberation. Today, one can see only shallow and barely discernible depressions on the summit of Paeantawan of what was once a labyrinth of running foxholes able to hide a standing man. There are no reminders of World War II in Garison except its name.	Santa Cruz
Products and Produce	Ibajay is famous for its nito handicraft made particularly in Barangay Mabusao, Regador and San Jose and has already become an export potential. Pottery has been a traditional industry of Barangay Coloncolong and their intricately-designed jars, vases, flower pots, and bricks have attracted traders, tourists and commuters along the National Highway where their products are displayed. A sumptuous ”linumak” commonly prepared in households is now commercially available. Pulvoron and other native delicacies are becoming popular as gifts and “pasalubong” abroad.	Mambusao, San Jose, Regador, and Colong-Colong

== Utilities ==
Communication and Postal services are available through the Philippine Postal Corporation, Inc. and the Bureau of Telecommunications. A PLDT, CRUZTELCO, and PANTELCO Public Calling Office provide long-distance and domestic telecommunication needs of the Ibayhanons. The Aklan Cable TV and Kalibo Cable TV provide the cable television services of the town.

The electricity is provided by the Aklan Electric Cooperative, which serves about 3,862 households. Barangay Malindog purchased its generator to provide alternative power to its residents. Barangay Aparicio and Mina-a completed the Micro-Hydro Power Plant projects and are now operational to provide electricity to the residents.

== Healthcare ==
Health services are provided by the Ibajay District Hospital and 11 Barangay Health Stations.

== Education ==
There are two schools district offices which govern all educational institutions within the municipality. They oversee the management and operations of all private and public, from primary to secondary schools. These are the:

- Ibajay I Schools District
- Ibajay II Schools District

There are 17 Elementary Schools, 14 Primary Schools, 6 National High Schools and Aklan State University (ASU) – Ibajay Campus for tertiary education.

There are also two (2) private secondary schools. One is Ibajay Academy, founded by Procopio Solidum, who was hailed as the "First Filipino poet to publish poems in English" or "First Filipino-English Poet." The other is Melchor Memorial School, founded by Dr Rafael S. Tumbokon in honour of the late Col. Alejandro S. Melchor Sr.

=== Primary and elementary schools ===
- Agbago Elementary School
- Agbaliw Primary School
- Agdugayan Elementary School
- Agutay Primary School
- Antipolo Primary School
- Aparicio Elementary School
- Aquino Elementary School
- Batuan Primary School
- Buenavista Primary School
- Bugtongbato Elementary School
- Cabugao Primary School
- Capilijan Elementary School
- Ibajay Academy
- Ibajay Central School
- Ibajay Integrated Learning Center
- Ibajay SDA Multigrade School
- Laguinbanwa Elementary School
- Mabusao Elementary School
- Malindog Primary School
- Maloco Elementary School
- Melchor Memorial School
- Mina-a Elementary School
- Monlaque Elementary School
- Naile Elementary School
- Naligusan Primary School
- Naisud Central School
- Ondoy Elementary School
- Regador Elementary School
- Rivera Primary School
- Rizal Elementary School
- San Isidro Elementary School
- San Jose Elementary School
- St. Peter Parochial School
- Sta. Cruz Elementary School
- Tagbaya Elementary School
- Tul-ang Elementary School (Tul-ang Primary School)
- Unat Bagacay Elementary School
- Yawan Primary School

=== Secondary schools ===
- Ibajay Integrated School
- Maloco National High School
- Monlaque National High School
- Naisud National High School
- Naile National High School
- Ondoy National High School

== Notable personalities ==
- Alejandro Melchor Sr., Filipino civil engineer, mathematician, educator
