= Nabas, Aklan =

Municipality in Aklan, Philippines

Nabas Alimbo
- Municipality
- Municipality of Nabas
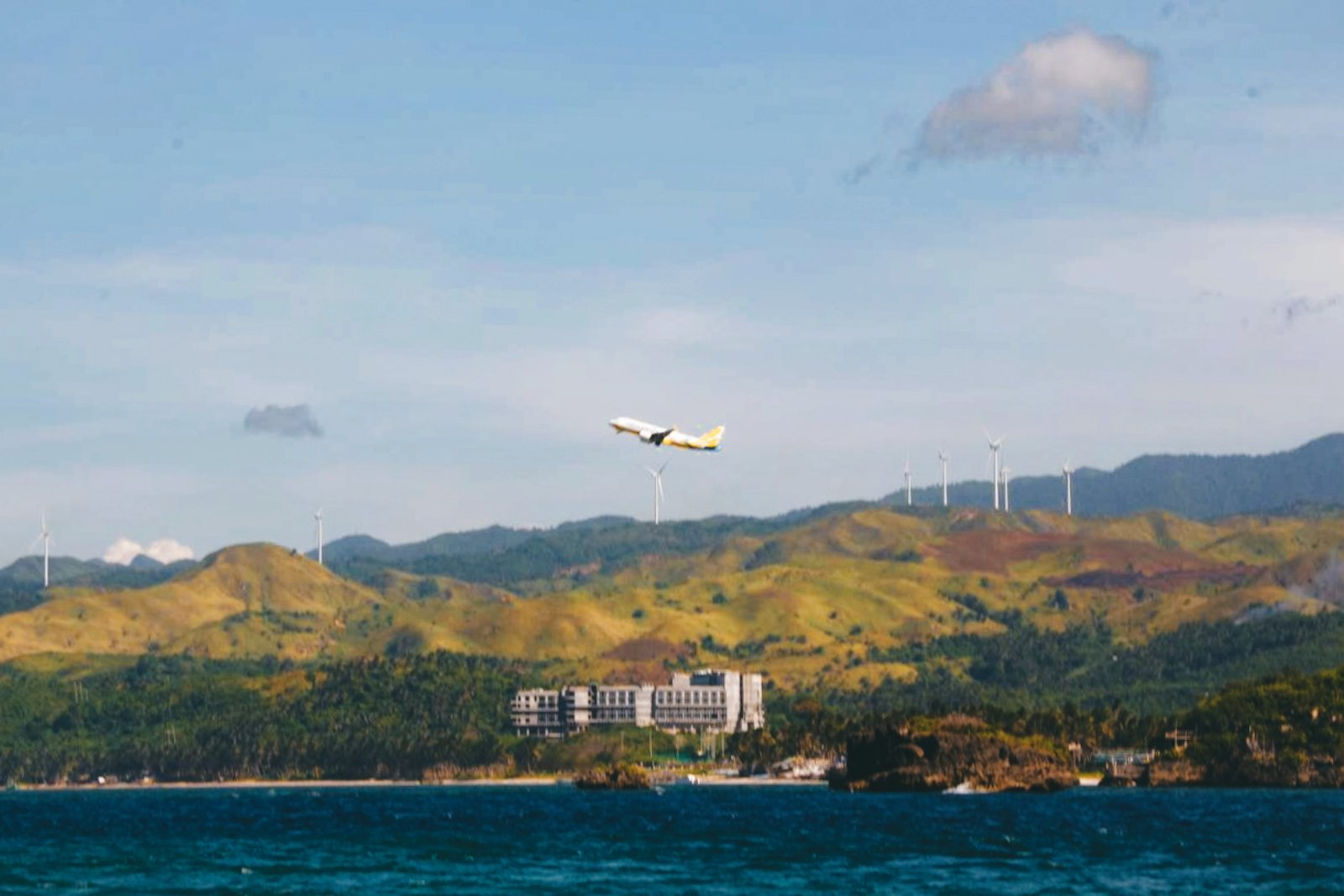
- Boracay Airport Union Arrival Terminal and Pawa Windfarm

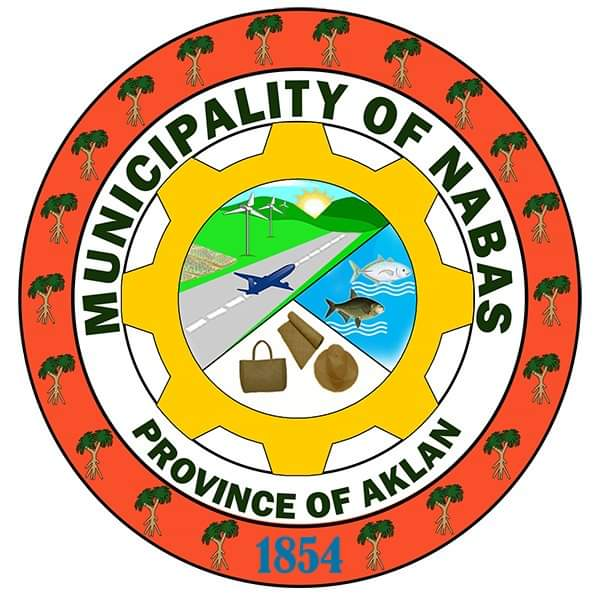
- Flag Seal
- Etymology: Navas
- Nickname: Nature's Haven
- Motto: Panguna Nabas
- Anthem: Nabas, Banwa Ko
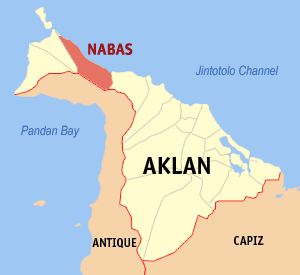
- Map of Aklan with Nabas highlighted
- Interactive map of Nabas
- Location within the Philippines
- Coordinates: 11°49′40″N 122°05′38″E
- Country: Philippines
- Region: Western Visayas
- Province: Aklan
- District: 2nd district
- Established: 1854
- Named for: Governor Nava
- Barangays: 20 (see Barangays)

Government
  - Type: Sangguniang Bayan
  - Mayor: Maria Fe Lasaleta
  - Vice Mayor: Stephen Z. Bolivar
  - Representative: Teodorico T. Haresco Jr.
  - Municipal Council: Members: Celon T. dela Torre; Stephen Z. Bolivar; Leovilyn S. dela Torre; Cognito D. Palomata Jr.; Maria Fe T. Lasaleta; Ciciron Myton C. Palanog; Joselito E. Santiago; Rhuna F. Tipgos
  - Electorate: 26,066 voters (2025)

Area
  - Total: 96.82 km^{2} (37.38 sq mi)
- Elevation: 64 m (210 ft)
- Highest elevation: 883 m (2,897 ft)
- Lowest elevation: 0 m (0 ft)

Population (2024 census)
  - Total: 41,568
  - Density: 429.3/km^{2} (1,112/sq mi)
  - Households: 9,868

Economy
  - Income class: 2nd municipal income class
  - Poverty incidence: 6.97% (2023)
  - Revenue: ₱ 222.8 million (2024)
  - Assets: ₱ 486.1 million (2024)
  - Expenditure: ₱ 212 million (2024)
  - Liabilities: ₱ 210.9 million (2024)

Service provider
  - Electricity: Aklan Electric Cooperative (AKELCO)
- Time zone: UTC+8 (PST)
- ZIP code: 5607
- PSGC: 060414000
- IDD : area code: +63 (0)36
- Website: nabas.gov.ph

Nabas, officially the Municipality of Nabas (Aklanon: Banwa it Nabas; Hiligaynon: Banwa sang Nabas; Tagalog: Bayan ng Nabas), is a municipality in the province of Aklan, Philippines. Nabas serves as the arrival gateway of Godofredo P. Ramos Airport. According to the 2024 census, it has a population of 41,568 people.

== History ==
Accounts about the earliest community of Nabas are uncertain but the initial documentation for the town's existence was recorded in 1845. Facing the Sibuyan Sea, the town started as a small coastal village referred to as Barrio Alimbo which extends to the hills and mountains to the west. This small community occupies the floodplains of Alimbo River where the village derived its name. Fishing and farming is the primary source of livelihood, even today except for the hunting which was common on that time because of the abundances of wild pig, monkey and deer in the area.

Before, the town was part of the municipality of Ibajay under the jurisdiction of Capiz Province. Ibajay's municipal boundary was so vast but with poor road system.

The developing populaces whose tongue and customs diverge from those of the eastern community build awareness amongst people of the west. The invasion of migrants from the nearby province of Antique continued that further emphasized the difference in dialect and culture to some extent. In 1853, their notion of a separate municipality for better living and independence serves as the foundation for taking a part of Alimbo together with its adjoining barrios of Nagustuhan (Nagustan), Panaytayon (Toledo), Gibungan (Gibon), Pakilawa (Unidos), Namao (Rizal), and Kabangrosan (Union) ceased to be a barrio to form a new municipality inevitably. The municipality was formed in 1854 and named Navas, after Governor Nava of the province of Capiz who came to inspect the area before its creation.

In 1861, the residents of Carabao Island (locally known as Hambil Island) chose to be annexed to the municipality of Navas, Capiz following the abolition of the Pueblo de Cabalian in Tablas Island. The annexation continued until 1897 when residents of Carabao Island voted to join the municipality of Looc, Romblon.

The Cartilla System, an early teaching methods that dominantly use the letter "b" than "v" caused the variable spelling of "Navas" and "Nabas". In 1906, the Municipal Council in a resolution approved by unanimous vote adopted the name Nabas as the official name.

Recently, Nabas is currently applying for cityhood making it the third in the province after neighboring Malay and the provincial capital Kalibo.

== Geography ==
Nabas is a strip of land located east of the town of Malay at the north-west tip of Panay Island called Northwest Panay Peninsula. It bounded on the north by Sibuyan Sea; on the south by Pandan, Antique; east by Ibajay; and west by Malay. It is 43 kilometres (27 mi) from Kalibo, the provincial capital.

The resort island of Boracay is located 2 kilometres (1.2 mi) from the north-westernmost tip of the town.

According to the Philippine Statistics Authority, the municipality has a land area of 96.82 square kilometres (37.38 sq mi) constituting 5.32% of the 1,821.42-square-kilometre- (703.25 sq mi) total area of Aklan.

=== Landscape ===
The Municipality of Nabas is considered as rolling terrain and rugged terrain land topographic formation. It has an elongated land area situated along the Northwestern Panay Peninsula, with 21-kilometer coastline facing Sibuyan Sea, and with such a large span of municipal waters, approximately 300 square kilometers.

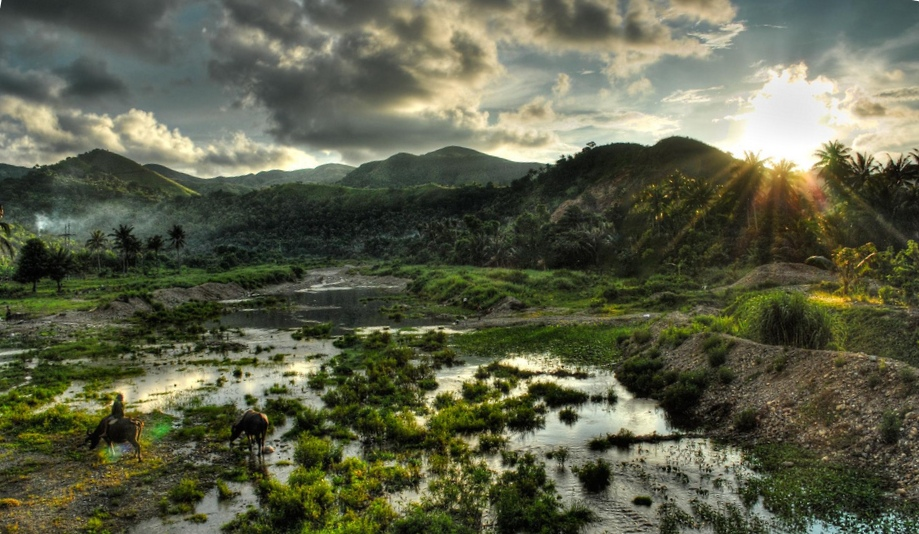
Unidos Landscape

This town features mountains, caves, water falls, sea, coral reefs, and sandy beaches.

Nabas has one of the last remaining low elevation intact rainforest that is home to various endemic flora and fauna.

=== Climate ===
Climate data for Nabas
Month	Jan	Feb	Mar	Apr	May	Jun	Jul	Aug	Sep	Oct	Nov	Dec	Year
Mean daily maximum °C (°F)	29 (84)	29 (84)	30 (86)	32 (90)	32 (90)	32 (90)	31 (88)	31 (88)	31 (88)	31 (88)	30 (86)	29 (84)	31 (87)
Mean daily minimum °C (°F)	24 (75)	24 (75)	25 (77)	25 (77)	25 (77)	25 (77)	25 (77)	25 (77)	25 (77)	25 (77)	25 (77)	25 (77)	25 (77)
Average rainfall mm (inches)	79 (3.1)	48 (1.9)	63 (2.5)	52 (2.0)	127 (5.0)	229 (9.0)	239 (9.4)	181 (7.1)	204 (8.0)	283 (11.1)	245 (9.6)	187 (7.4)	1,937 (76.1)
Average rainy days	15	11	9	6	11	18	20	18	18	21	19	20	186
Source: World Weather Online (calculated/modeled data, not measured locally)

=== Barangays ===
Nabas is politically subdivided into 20 barangays. Each barangay consists of puroks and some have sitios.

There are 11 barangays which considered coastal and the rest of which are landlocked barangays. Twelve of these 20 barangays are located along the highway.

PSGC	Barangay	Population			±% p.a.	
		2024		2010		
060414001	Alimbo-Baybay	3.3%	1,356	1,020	▴	1.99%
060414003	Buenafortuna	3.0%	1,262	1,107	▴	0.91%
060414002	Buenasuerte	4.8%	2,009	1,603	▴	1.57%
060414004	Buenavista	3.6%	1,491	1,434	▴	0.27%
060414005	Gibon	7.8%	3,239	2,887	▴	0.80%
060414006	Habana	3.2%	1,313	1,096	▴	1.26%
060414007	Laserna	7.1%	2,950	2,497	▴	1.16%
060414008	Libertad	4.0%	1,653	1,263	▴	1.88%
060414009	Magallanes	2.1%	885	680	▴	1.84%
060414010	Matabana	2.1%	854	642	▴	1.99%
060414012	Nagustan	8.0%	3,307	2,937	▴	0.82%
060414013	Pawa	0.7%	309	208	▴	2.78%
060414014	Pinatuad	1.8%	736	729	▴	0.07%
060414015	Poblacion	5.1%	2,115	1,897	▴	0.76%
060414016	Rizal	3.6%	1,489	1,291	▴	0.99%
060414017	Solido	4.5%	1,855	1,757	▴	0.38%
060414018	Tagororoc	2.6%	1,091	846	▴	1.77%
060414019	Toledo	6.3%	2,608	2,222	▴	1.11%
060414020	Unidos	7.4%	3,066	2,344	▴	1.87%
060414021	Union	6.8%	2,847	2,592	▴	0.65%
	Total		41,568	31,052	▴	2.04%

== Demographics ==
Population census of Nabas
Year	Pop.	±% p.a.
1903	6,455	—
1918	7,355	+0.87%
1939	9,768	+1.36%
1948	10,442	+0.74%
1960	11,879	+1.08%
1970	13,850	+1.55%
1975	15,051	+1.68%
1980	16,607	+1.99%
1990	20,538	+2.15%
1995	21,391	+0.77%
2000	25,014	+3.41%
2007	28,345	+1.74%
2010	31,052	+3.38%
2015	36,435	+3.09%
2020	40,632	+2.32%
2024	41,568	+0.55%
Source: Philippine Statistics Authority

The population of Nabas has grown dramatically for the past decade. It holds the record of fastest growing population in the whole province of Aklan covering 2011–2015, and third fastest growing population covering 2016–2020.

The Municipality of Nabas was among the fastest growing town having a population growth rate almost three times the rate of the provincial and regional levels. The rapid increase in the population growth could be attributed to in-migration due to its developing tourism industry.

=== Language ===
The residents of Nabas speaks Nabasnon, a variant of Karay-a and quite similar to Onhan Language of the islands of Hambil and Southern Tablas in Romblon Province. The eastern half of the municipality has the accent influenced and similar to Karay-a, spoken by the neighboring Antiqueños particularly the people from the towns Libertad, Pandan, and Sebaste of Antique. Those in the western half speak similar to the dialect currently regarded as Malaynon with softer intonation. Aklanon, Hiligaynon, and Tagalog are also widely used.

== Economy ==
Poverty incidence of Nabas (%)

Source: Philippine Statistics Authority

Nabas, a municipality, is noted for its hat and mat industry made of indigenous bariw leaves which abound on the hillsides and plain lowlands of the town. It is likewise a farming and fishing community with its vast lowlands and long shoreline. While the cost of marine commodity has soared due to the proximity of Nabas to Boracay Island, the fishermen remained impoverished.

In Nabas, there is a PetroWind Energy Inc. 36-megawatt wind farm in Brgy Pawa, which is an array of wind turbines lined-up along a mountain ridge aimed to spur tourism and add livelihood in the area is the biggest single venture in the province of Aklan.

The town serves as a satellite area for the expansion of tourism from the traditional town of Malay to expand and stretch developments to Nabas.

== Culture and Festivals ==
Nabas is predominantly Roman Catholic. Various religious festivity is being celebrated throughout the year in different villages and in the town as a whole.

The Nabas Bariw Festival is celebrated to commemorate the feast day of Saint Isidore the Farmer, which is chosen as the town's patron saint for the town being originally agricultural. It is celebrated annually from May 12 to 15. This celebration showcases the town's hat, mat and other bariw products as well as the town's unique tourism sites and natural attractions. During this affair, various skills in mat, hat and bag making and designing are demonstrated. Among the events is a contest to produce the biggest hat and mat contest. The festival is highlighted by continuous street dancing by folks from the town's 20 barangays dressed in colorful bariw costumes accompanied by indigenous bamboo instruments.

The Nabas Municipal and Religious Fiesta is celebrated annually to commemorate the feast of Nuestra Señora de Salvacion every September 24. The feast honors the Patron Saint of Our Lady Of Salvation after the town is spared from the Japanese fatal ruthlessness during the World War II.

The Ati-Atihan Festival is also celebrated in Nagustan every February.

The San Juan Fiesta is celebrated along the coastal communities every June 24. Beach side tent parties are being held by families joining the event. Boat racing, swimming, and fluvial parades are among the highlights of the fair.

The Pailaw sa Nabas is a music and light festival held every last quarter of November or 1st quarter of December to mark the start of yuletide season in the town. The opening of lights, musical performances, live bands, and firework display are the highlights of the event.

== Education ==
The Nabas Schools District Office governs all educational institutions within the municipality. It oversees the management and operations of all private and public, from primary to secondary schools.

=== Primary and elementary schools ===
- Alimbo Baybay Primary School
- Buenafortuna Elementary School
- Buenasuerte Elementary School
- Gibon Elementary School
- Habana Elementary School
- Laguna Nabas-Aklan Christian Learning Center
- Laserna Integrated School
- Libertad Elementary School
- Magallanes Primary School
- Matabana Elementary School
- Nabas Elementary School
- Nagustan Elementary School
- Pawa Primary School
- Pinatuad Elementary School
- Rizal Elementary School
- San Isidro Labrador Formation Center
- Solido Elementary School
- St. Anne Business Institute
- Tagororoc Integrated School
- Toledo Elementary School
- Unidos Elementary School
- Union Elementary School
- Western Aklan Academy
- Western Aklan SDA Multigrade School

=== Secondary schools ===
- Laserna Integrated School
- Solido National High School
- Tagororoc Integrated School
- Toledo National High School
- Unidos National High School
- Union National High School

== Gallery ==
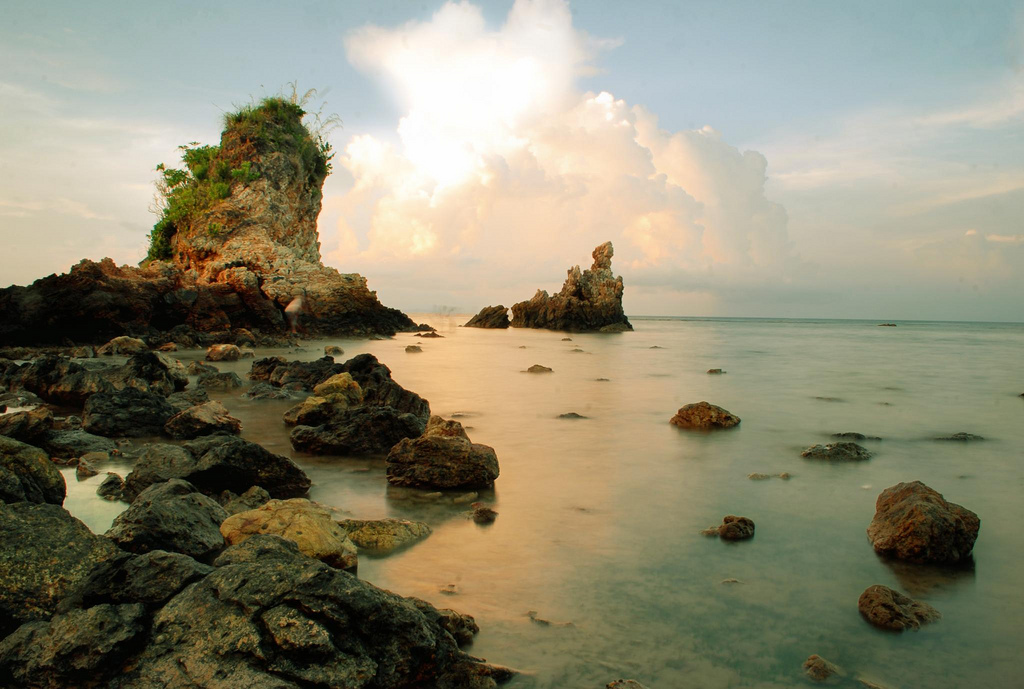
Union Seascape

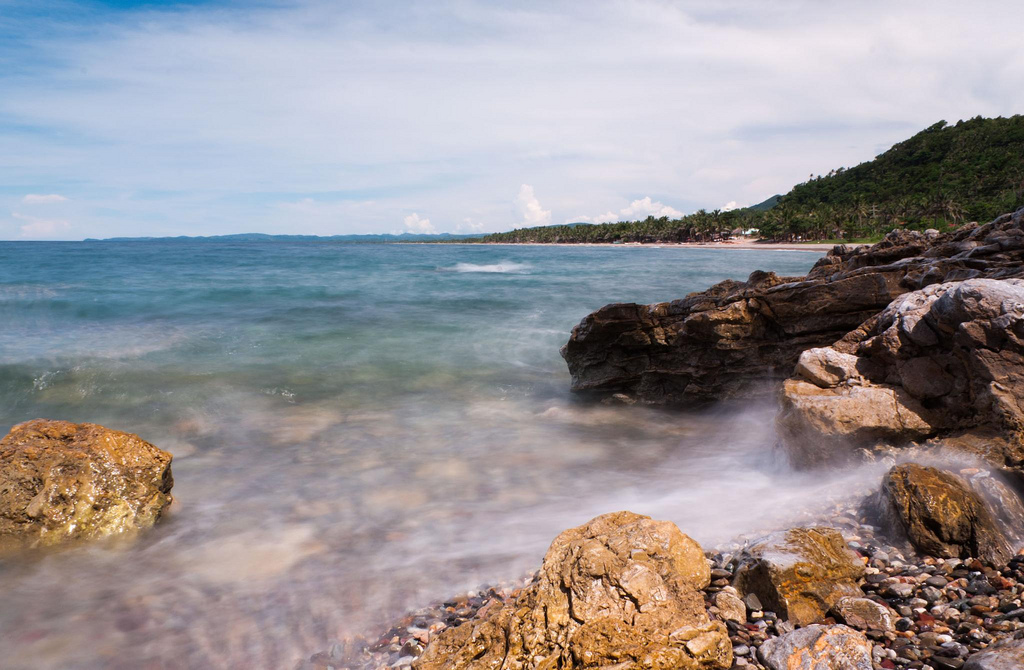
Gibon Seascape

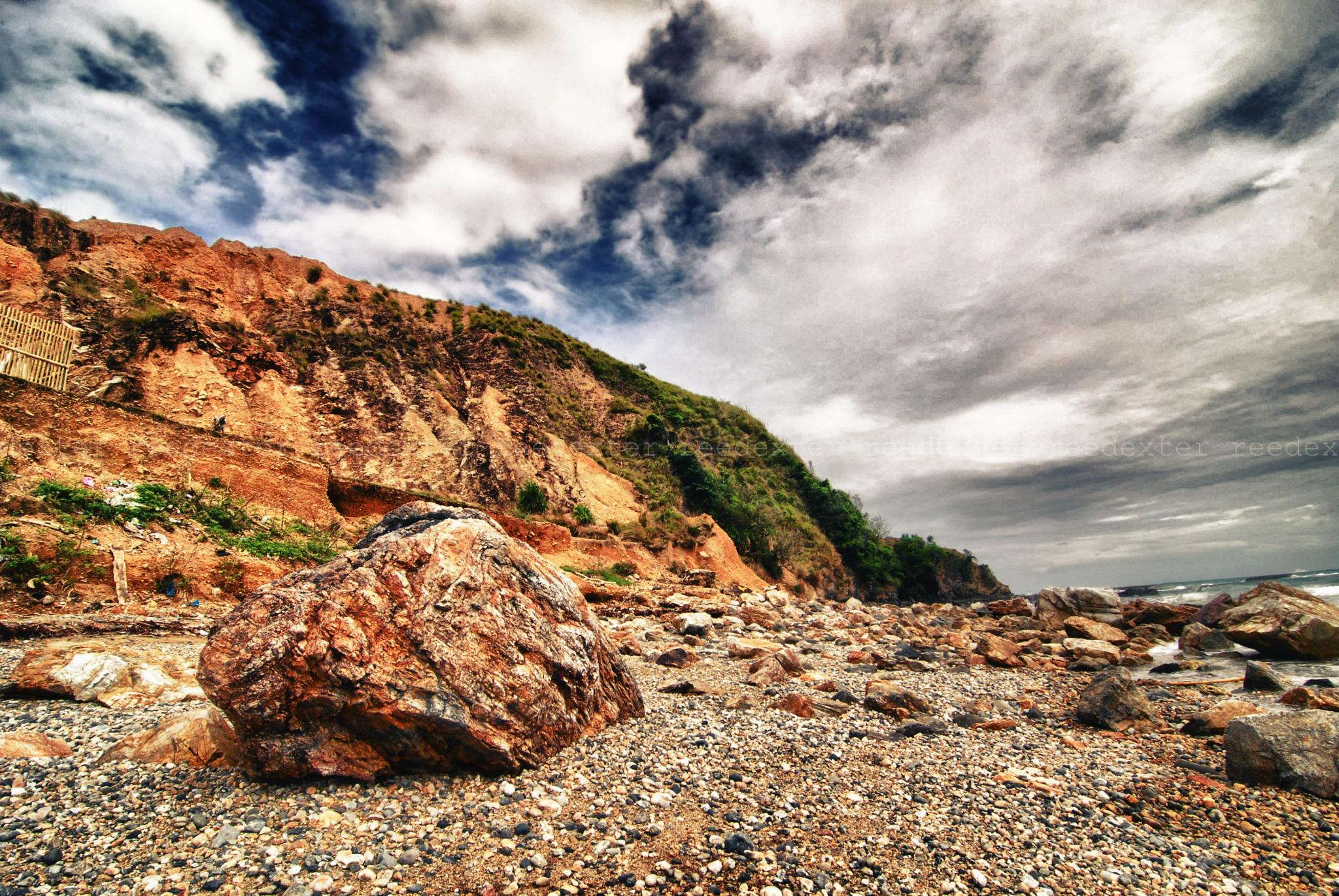
Unidos Landscape
