= Golden Sarok Rotonda =

- Rotunda Sarok; Golden Sarok Shrine; Sarok; Sarok Rotunda

Location
- Crossing Banga and New Washington, Kalibo, Aklan, Philippines
- Roads at junction: Toting Reyes Street; Osmena Avenue; Jaime Cardinal Sin Avenue (formerly Quezon Avenue); Desposorio Maagma Sr. Street

Construction
- Type: Roundabout

Golden Sarok Rotonda, also known as Rotunda Sarok, Golden Sarok Shrine, or simply Sarok is a roundabout structure at the junction of Toting Reyes Street, Osmeña Avenue, Jaime Cardinal Sin Ave. (formerly Quezon Avenue) and Desposorio Maagma Sr. Street also known as Crossing Banga and New Washington in Kalibo, Aklan, Philippines. It serves as a prominent landmark to the main business area of Kalibo.

== History and significance ==
Erected in 1973, the landmark was donated by Jose "Peping" Briones Fernandez to the municipality of Kalibo during the term of Mayor Federico Icamina. Fernandez, son of former mayor of Kalibo Juez Juan Fernandez was a U.S. Pilot who returned to his hometown Kalibo upon his retirement. It was primarily built to honor the local farmers as Kalibo and Aklan are agricultural town and province, respectively. It also stands as a symbol of Panay's folk history known as the Barter of Panay wherein the Bornean datus headed by Datu Puti bought Panay Island (formerly known as Anninipay) from the Aeta chief Marikudo, in exchange for gold necklace, bolts of cloth, golden trinkets and of course, a "golden sarok". Sarok is the local Akeanon term for a hat. It has formed part of the Kalibonhons and Aklanons daily life, tradition, culture and heritage for decades. From a trip to neighboring provinces or from a flight from Manila or overseas, the sight of the structure, in the collective consciousness of Kalibonhons and Aklanons means they are once again "home".

According to Jean Tejada-Velarde, it also serves as a symbol of generosity of the Fernandezes who donated their lot to the local government so that a road can be constructed in that area to open up Toting Reyes Street.

== Demolition ==
In February 2015, during the term of Mayor William Lachica, the municipal government of Kalibo through Sangguniang Bayan Member Augusto Tolentino has announced its plan to demolish the Golden Sarok Rotonda and replace it with an intersection with traffic lights in a bid to ease the traffic to and from central Kalibo. In June 2015, a public hearing was held where it was agreed that the landmark structure be relocated. Conservationists are calling the project unnecessary; instead, they said the local police should discipline the traffic enforcers and erring drivers and remove illegally parked vehicles in the area to ease traffic woes. A petition was initiated to preserve and conserve the landmark. However, this did not stop the local government from pushing through with its planned demolition of the decades-old landmark to give way to traffic lights installation.

== The New Sarok Arch ==
Instead of relocating the landmark as agreed during the public hearing, a new arch, funded by the local government of Kalibo, was built at a new location at the corner of Mabini Street and Desposorio Maagma Sr. Street to continue the legacy of the Golden Sarok Rotonda landmark. The arch with the words "Vibrant Kalibo" features a replica of the “Golden Salakot” which is leading to the historic Aklan Freedom Shrine and the Kalibo Ati-Atihan County Inn. This is the new Golden Sarok Shrine.
