= Jonha Richman =

Filipino businesswoman and politician

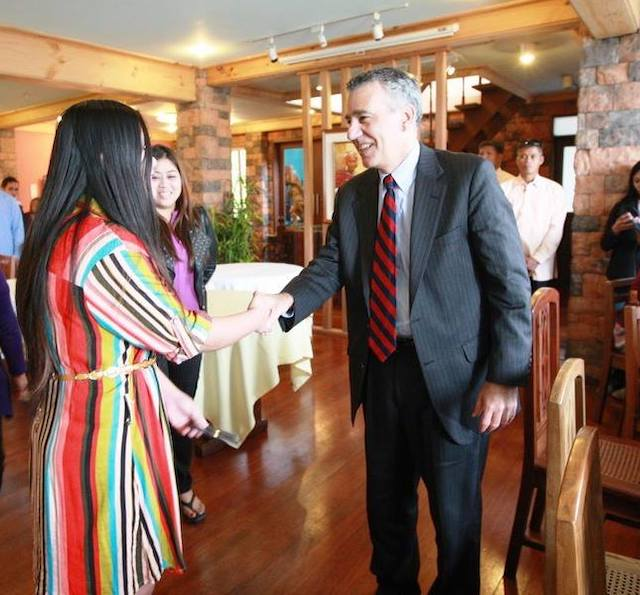
- Richman with former US Ambassador Philip Goldberg
- Born: Jonha Ducayag Revesencio; March 8, 1989 (age 37); Balete, Aklan Philippines
- Occupations: Entrepreneur, Investor
- Organization: Startup Weekend

Jonha Richman (born Jonha Ducayag Revesencio) is a Filipino-born businesswoman. Rappler recognised her as one of the 'most inspiring Filipino entrepreneurs' and SunStar considered her as one of the most 'successful Filipino businesswomen'. Dubbed as the 'Most Connected Businesswoman from Asia', she is an advocate for startups, women empowerment and equality. She campaigned for educational reform in efforts to teach kids in embracing failure to succeed.

She is a patron of UK Charity Week and mentor for Startup Weekend, an organisation which advocates for inclusivity in the technological space.

== Biography ==
Richman studied computer programming at STI College. She started her career working on campaigns for brands including Google, Pepsi, and Bloomberg.

Richman splits her time between Singapore, the Philippines, and the United Kingdom. In 2019, she put the city of Iloilo in the worldwide economic map as she reportedly sold a portion of her real estate portfolio for cryptocurrencies, making the city being the first mover in Asia.

== Works ==
A business columnist for Fast Company, and Huffington Post, her essay on “Philippines: A Digital Lifestyle Capital in the Making?” became one of the basis for the proposed bill by Senator Antonio Trillanes about his campaign against trolls on social media.

== Awards and recognition ==
- Top Ten Most Influential Leaders in the Philippine Tech Scene, 2014
