= Gabrielle Calizo-Quimpo =

Filipina politician

The Honourable Gabrielle V. Calizo-Quimpo
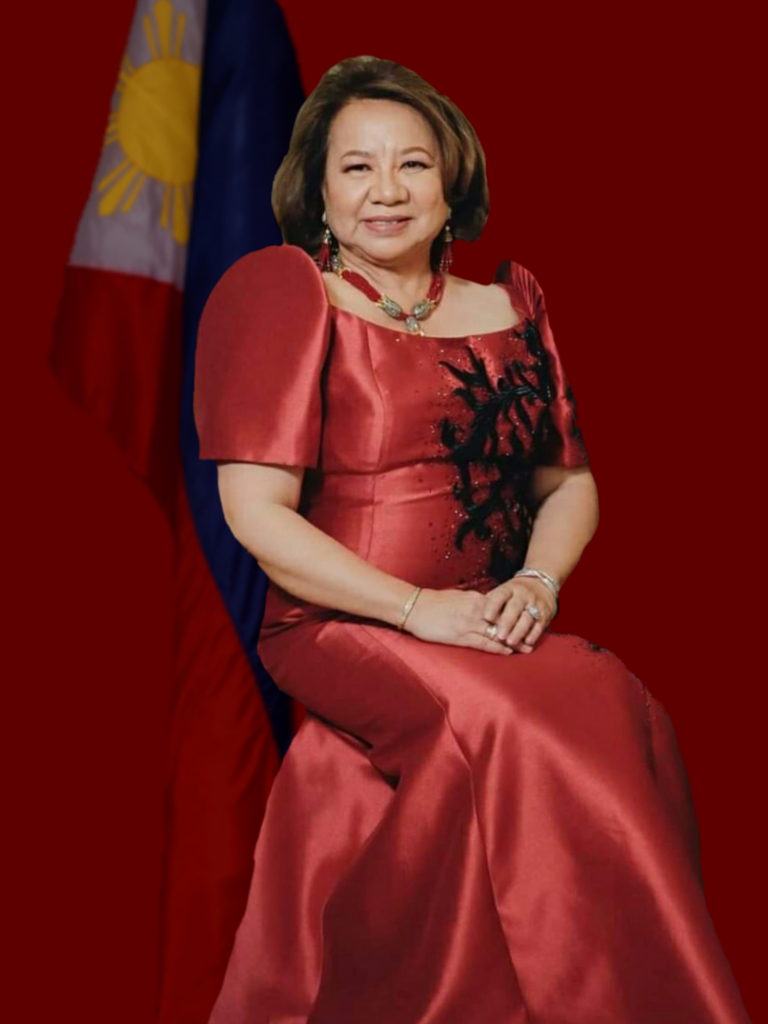

Vice Governor of Aklan
- In office June 30, 2007 – June 30, 2016
- Governor: Carlito Marquez (2007–2013); Florencio Miraflores (2013–2016)
- Preceded by: Ronquillo Tolentino
- Succeeded by: Reynaldo M. Quimpo

Member of the Philippine House of Representatives from Aklan's Lone District
- In office June 30, 2001 – June 30, 2004
- Preceded by: Allen S. Quimpo
- Succeeded by: Florencio T. Miraflores

Member of the Aklan Provincial Board from the 1st District
- In office June 30, 1998 – June 30, 2001

Personal details
- Born: Balete, Aklan
- Citizenship: Philippines
- Spouse: Reynaldo M. Quimpo
- Occupation: Consultant at Provincial Government of Aklan
- Profession: Politician

Gabrielle "Billie" V. Calizo-Quimpo (born in Balete, Aklan) is a Filipina politician. She is daughter of late Balete Mayor Teodoro F. Calizo. She is married to Reynaldo "Boy" Quimpo.

== Political career ==
She served as Provincial Board Member in Aklan from 1998 to 2001. Calizo-Quimpo served as Representative from lone district of Aklan from 2001 to 2004 and she succeeded by Florencio T. Miraflores. She was the Vice Governor of Aklan from 2007 to 2016 and succeeded by her husband, Reynaldo "Boy" Quimpo. After her term as Vice Governor, she is Consultant at Provincial Government of Aklan.

Calizo-Quimpo received the award called Philippines Awards Best Practices in 'eGovernance' for LGUs held in Philippine International Convention Center. In 2013, one of her legacy during her term is the Construction of Kalibo - Numancia Bridge.

House of Representatives of the Philippines
Preceded by Allen S. Quimpo	Representative, Lone District of Aklan; 2001–2004	Succeeded by Florencio T. Miraflores

Political offices
Preceded by Ronquillo Tolentino	Vice Governor of Aklan; 2007–2016	Succeeded by Reynaldo Quimpo
