= Hybrid Trimaran (Philippine ship) =

History

Philippines
- Name: Hybrid Trimaran
- Builder: Metallica Consultancy
- Cost: ₱76 million
- Laid down: December 2018
- Status: Underconstruction

General characteristics
- Class & type: Trimaran
- Capacity: 100 passengers, 4 vans, and 15 motorcycles

The Hybrid Trimaran is a gas and wave-powered trimaran vessel under construction.

== Background ==
The Hybrid Trimaran Project, known fully as the "Hybrid Trimaran Fast Craft Passenger Cargo Vessel using Multi-Engine and Alternative Energy Source from Ocean Waves", was a concept by Filipino engineer Jonathan Salvador of Metallica Consultancy and is intended to come up with a design for a ship which has a "modern design, environment-friendly, safe and unsinkable". The project funded by the Department of Science and Technology is a collaboration of the Aklan State University (ASU), the Maritime Industry Authority (MARINA), the Philippine Council for Industry, Energy and Emerging Technology Research and Development, Metallica and the Aklan Congressional Office. The project was delayed due issues of government-related bureaucracy. As part of the project, a prototype of a ship powered by both gas and waves will be constructed and if found feasible will be offered to interested parties.

In February 2018, the DOST pledged a budget of ₱76 million for the ship project. MARINA's involvement in the project is to ensure the finished product would meet international safety and emission standards.

The project is planned to be named as "Dual Stroke Cylinder Pumps with 30 Units Working" or "Duterte" for short.

== Construction ==
The implementation of the Hybrid Trimaran project will be made in two phases, the construction of the watercraft, and the development of technology that would enable the vessel to devise wave technology. The keel laying for the ship was held in December 2018. By June 2019, the Hybrid Trimaran is already half complete.

== Specification ==
The Hybrid Trimarin is intended to be a vessel powered by a mix of gasoline and wave technology; using primarily gas when port maneuvering while powered by waves while it sails in open water. Waves gathered from the vessel's outriggers will drive the double action hydraulic pumps which will generate power for the ship. Multi-engine technology will be used as a precaution against total engine failure and the ship's structure will be designed in a way that would minimize it chances of capsizing. The ship will be made of steel.

It is envisioned to be a combined passenger and cargo vessel, smaller but similar to a Roll-on/roll-off (RoRo) ship. Its planned capacity is 100 passengers, 4 vans, and 15 motorcycles. The emission of the vessel is planned to be similar to land vehicles complying with Euro IV to Euro V emission standards
