= Manduyog Hill =

Religious sanctuary in Banga, Aklan, Philippines

Coordinates: 11°38′03″N 122°19′54″E

Manduyog Hill is a religious sanctuary located east of the Aklan State University, Banga, Aklan, the Philippines. It is named after Datu Manduyog, a ruler of Aklan from the 15th century, and rises up to 500 feet (150 meters).

The top of the hill has a large white cross. Manduyog Hill also has a chapel and the 14 Stations of the Cross. Visitors conduct annual pilgrimages every Holy Week on Good Friday. However, there are also tourists that just enjoy the hill's environment.
