= Altavas =

Municipality in Aklan, Philippines

Altavas Jimeno
- Municipality
- Municipality of Altavas
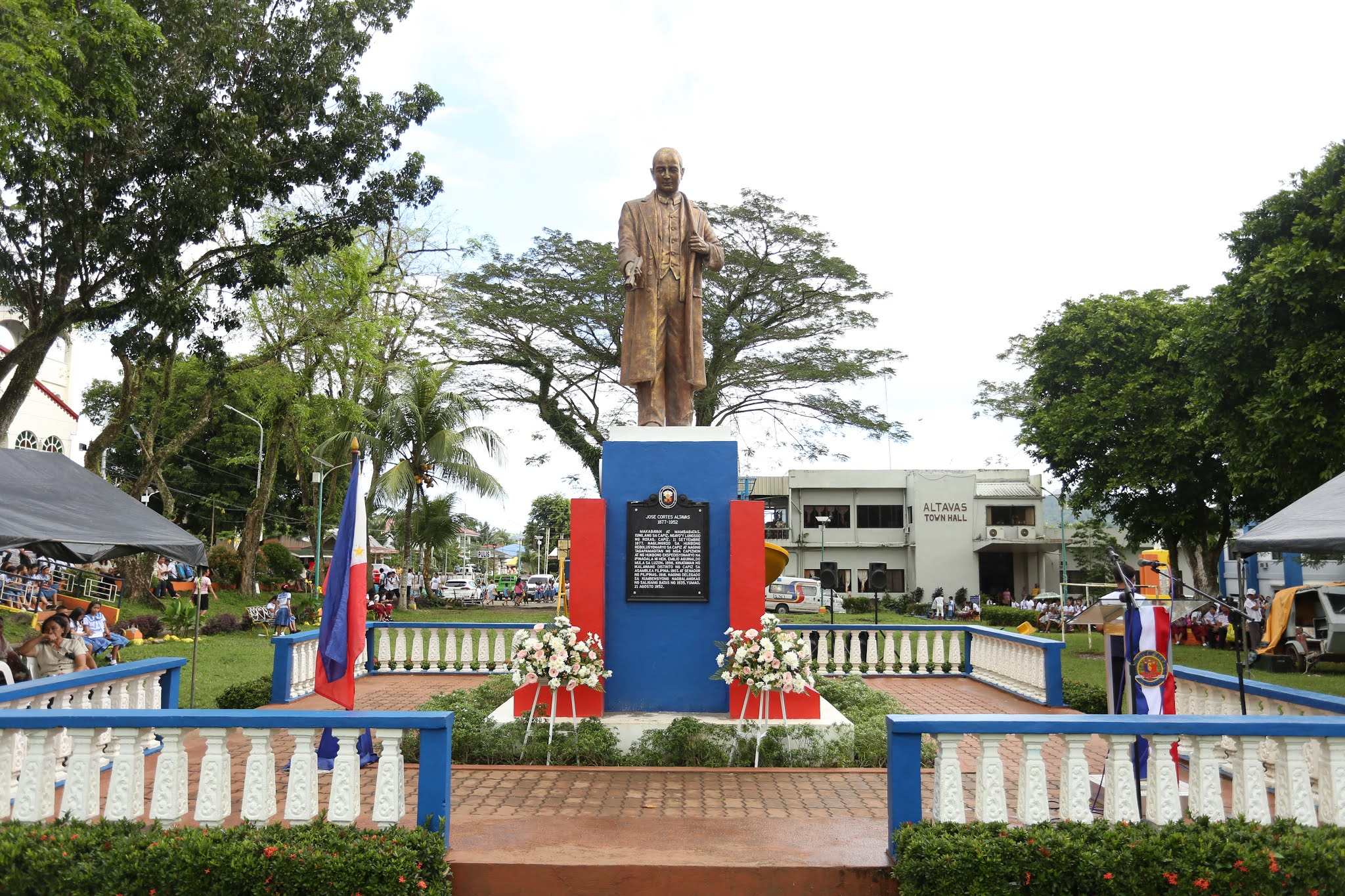
- Jose Cortes Altavas monument

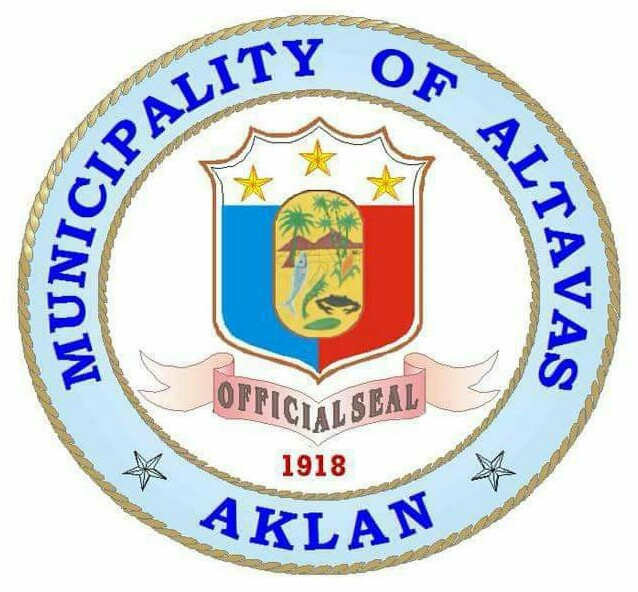
- Flag Seal

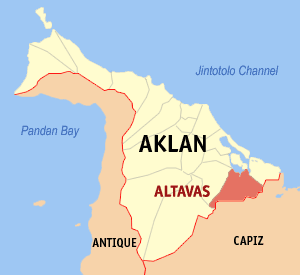
- Map of Aklan with Altavas highlighted
- Interactive map of Altavas
- Location within the Philippines
- Coordinates: 11°32′18″N 122°29′13″E
- Country: Philippines
- Region: Western Visayas
- Province: Aklan
- District: 1st district
- Named for: Jose Altavas
- Barangays: 14 (see Barangays)

Government
  - Type: Sangguniang Bayan
  - Mayor: Denny B. Refol Jr.
  - Vice Mayor: Denny D. Refol Sr.
  - Representative: Carlito S. Marquez
  - Municipal Council: Members: Confesor F. Inocencio III; Neslyn May L. Belarmino; Ric D'Cor M. Dalida; Mylah Flor I. Villas; Roger S. Oquendo; Mary Ellen Q. Masangya; Joly A. Solita; Hernan E. Catuiran
  - Electorate: 17,774 voters (2025)

Area
  - Total: 109.05 km^{2} (42.10 sq mi)
- Elevation: 38 m (125 ft)
- Highest elevation: 282 m (925 ft)
- Lowest elevation: 0 m (0 ft)

Population (2024 census)
  - Total: 26,181
  - Density: 240.08/km^{2} (621.81/sq mi)
  - Households: 6,504

Economy
  - Income class: 3rd municipal income class
  - Poverty incidence: 10.03% (2023)
  - Revenue: ₱ 161.9 million (2024)
  - Assets: ₱ 580.9 million (2024)
  - Expenditure: ₱ 77.92 million (2024)
  - Liabilities: ₱ 152.1 million (2024)

Service provider
  - Electricity: Aklan Electric Cooperative (AKELCO)
- Time zone: UTC+8 (PST)
- ZIP code: 5616
- PSGC: 060401000
- IDD : area code: +63 (0)36
- Native languages: Aklanon; Hiligaynon; Capisnon; Tagalog
- Website: altavasaklan.gov.ph

Altavas, officially the Municipality of Altavas (Aklanon: Banwa it Altavas; Hiligaynon: Banwa sang Altavas; Tagalog: Bayan ng Altavas), is a municipality in the province of Aklan, Philippines. According to the 2024 census, it has a population of 26,181 people.

== Geography ==
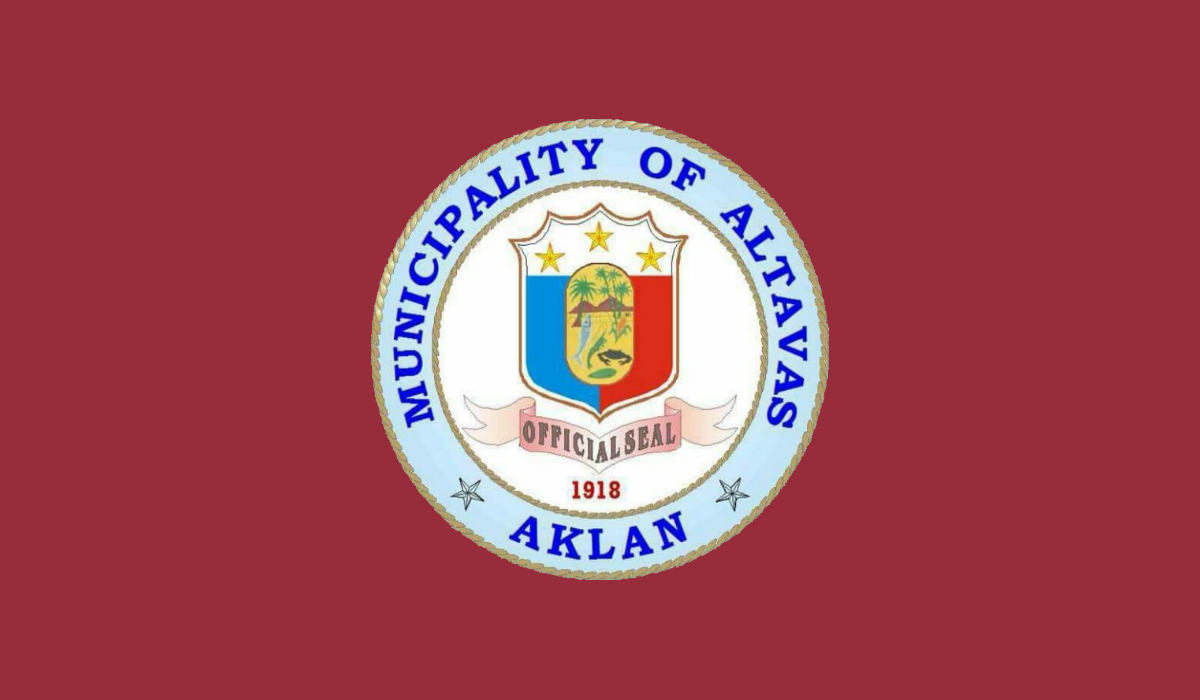
Alternate flag of Altavas

Altavas is 41 kilometers (25 mi) from the provincial capital of Kalibo, 45 kilometers (28 mi) from Roxas City, and two hours from Boracay Island.

According to the Philippine Statistics Authority, the municipality has a land area of 109.05 square kilometers (42.10 sq mi) constituting 5.99% of the 1,821.42-square-kilometer- (703.25 sq mi) total area of Aklan.

=== Climate ===
Climate data for Altavas, Aklan
Month	Jan	Feb	Mar	Apr	May	Jun	Jul	Aug	Sep	Oct	Nov	Dec	Year
Mean daily maximum °C (°F)	28 (82)	29 (84)	30 (86)	32 (90)	32 (90)	31 (88)	30 (86)	30 (86)	29 (84)	29 (84)	29 (84)	28 (82)	30 (86)
Mean daily minimum °C (°F)	23 (73)	22 (72)	23 (73)	24 (75)	25 (77)	25 (77)	25 (77)	24 (75)	24 (75)	24 (75)	24 (75)	23 (73)	24 (75)
Average precipitation mm (inches)	47 (1.9)	33 (1.3)	39 (1.5)	48 (1.9)	98 (3.9)	150 (5.9)	169 (6.7)	147 (5.8)	163 (6.4)	172 (6.8)	118 (4.6)	80 (3.1)	1,264 (49.8)
Average rainy days	11.4	8.2	9.3	9.7	19.1	25.6	27.4	25.5	25.5	25.2	18.5	14.5	219.9
Source: Meteoblue (Use with caution: this is modeled/calculated data, not measured locally.)

=== Barangays ===
Altavas is politically subdivided into 14 barangays. Each barangay consists of puroks and some have sitios.

PSGC	Barangay	Population			±% p.a.	
		2024		2010		
060401001	Cabangila	6.5%	1,705	1,705	Steady	0.00%
060401002	Cabugao	7.5%	1,964	1,708	▴	0.98%
060401003	Catmon	4.6%	1,208	1,504	▾	−1.51%
060401004	Dalipdip	2.9%	772	698	▴	0.70%
060401005	Ginictan	5.8%	1,521	1,527	▾	−0.03%
060401006	Linayasan	7.2%	1,872	1,860	▴	0.04%
060401007	Lumaynay	6.1%	1,593	1,585	▴	0.04%
060401008	Lupo	8.1%	2,127	2,251	▾	−0.39%
060401009	Man-up	4.2%	1,112	2,360	▾	−5.10%
060401010	Odiong	11.6%	3,028	2,961	▴	0.16%
060401011	Poblacion	16.8%	4,406	2,465	▴	4.12%
060401012	Quinasay-an	1.9%	491	459	▴	0.47%
060401013	Talon	6.1%	1,589	1,587	▴	0.01%
060401014	Tibiao	4.7%	1,231	1,249	▾	−0.10%
	Total		26,181	23,919	▴	0.63%

== Demographics ==
Population census of Altavas
Year	Pop.	±% p.a.
1903	4,636	—
1918	6,046	+1.79%
1939	8,882	+1.85%
1948	10,238	+1.59%
1960	13,325	+2.22%
1970	14,519	+0.86%
1975	16,855	+3.04%
1980	17,443	+0.69%
1990	20,531	+1.64%
1995	21,475	+0.85%
2000	22,496	+1.00%
2007	23,692	+0.72%
2010	23,919	+0.35%
2015	24,619	+0.55%
2020	25,639	+0.86%
2024	26,181	+0.50%
Source: Philippine Statistics Authority

In the 2024 census, Altavas had a population of 26,181. The population density was 240 inhabitants per square kilometer (620/sq mi).

=== Language ===
Aklanon is the main dialect of Altavas while Hiligaynon is also spoken and understood by the residents. Capiznon, on the other hand, is also used due to its border with Capiz.

== Economy ==
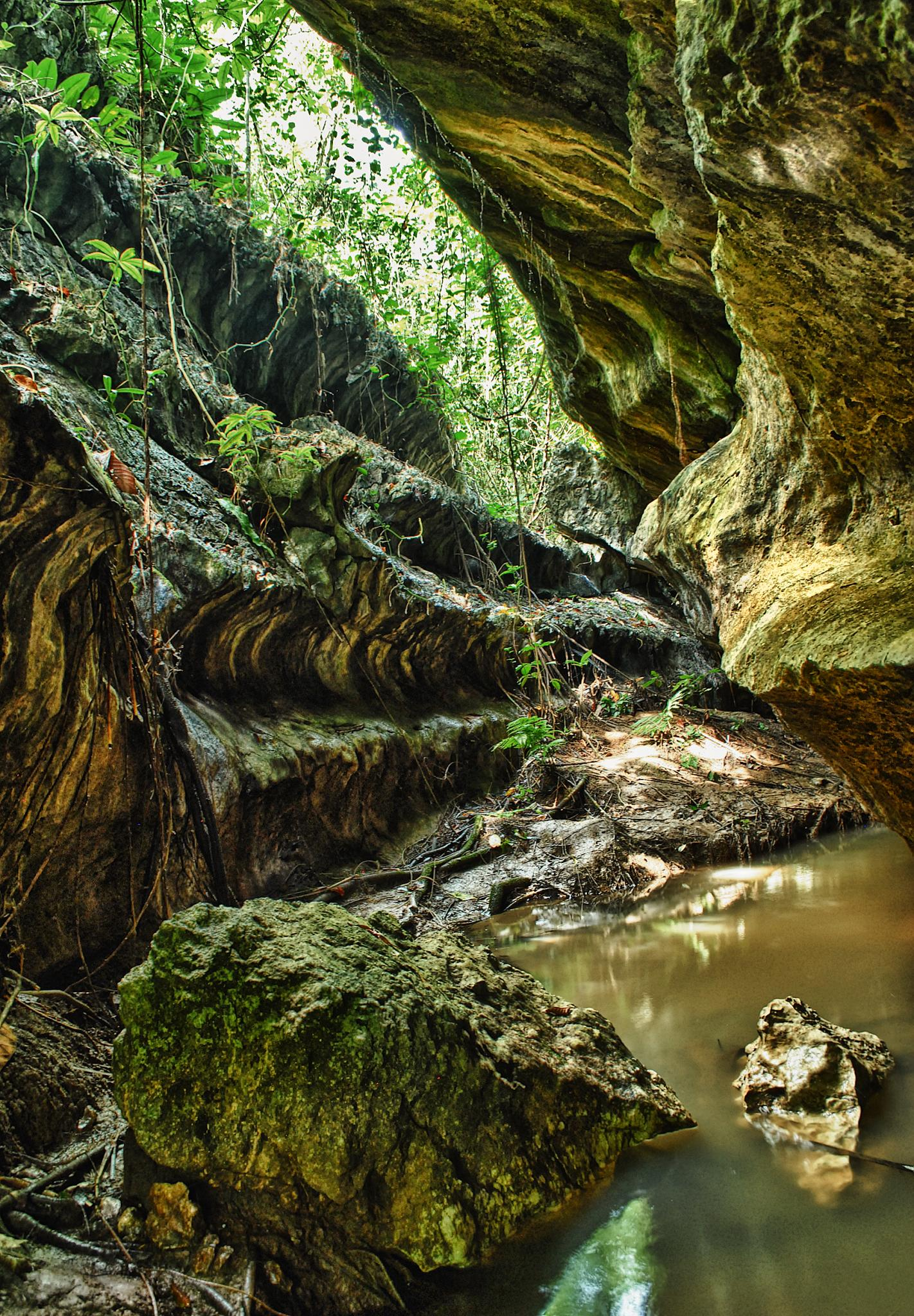
Altavas Cave

Poverty incidence of Altavas

Source: Philippine Statistics Authority

== Education ==
The Altavas Schools District Office governs all educational institutions within the municipality. It oversees the management and operations of all private and public, from primary to secondary schools.

=== Primary and elementary schools ===
- Altavas Elementary School
- Cabangila Elementary School
- Cabugao Elementary School
- Catmon Elementary School
- Dalipdip Primary School
- Dina-ut Primary School
- Eahog Primary School
- Echelon Development School
- Ginictan Elementary School
- Guisi Elementary School
- Hongoton Primary School
- Linayasan Elementary School
- Lumaynay Elementary School
- Lumaynay Elementary School (Sangay Annex)
- Lupo Elementary School
- Odiong Elementary School
- Quinasayan Primary School
- Sapa Primary School
- Talon Elementary School
- Tibiao Elementary School

=== Secondary schools ===
- Altavas National School
- Altavas National School (Lupo Extension)
- Justicia Morales - Young Memorial National High School
- Linayasan National High School

=== Higher educational institution ===
- Altavas College
