= Tugce Ergul =

Turkish businesswoman

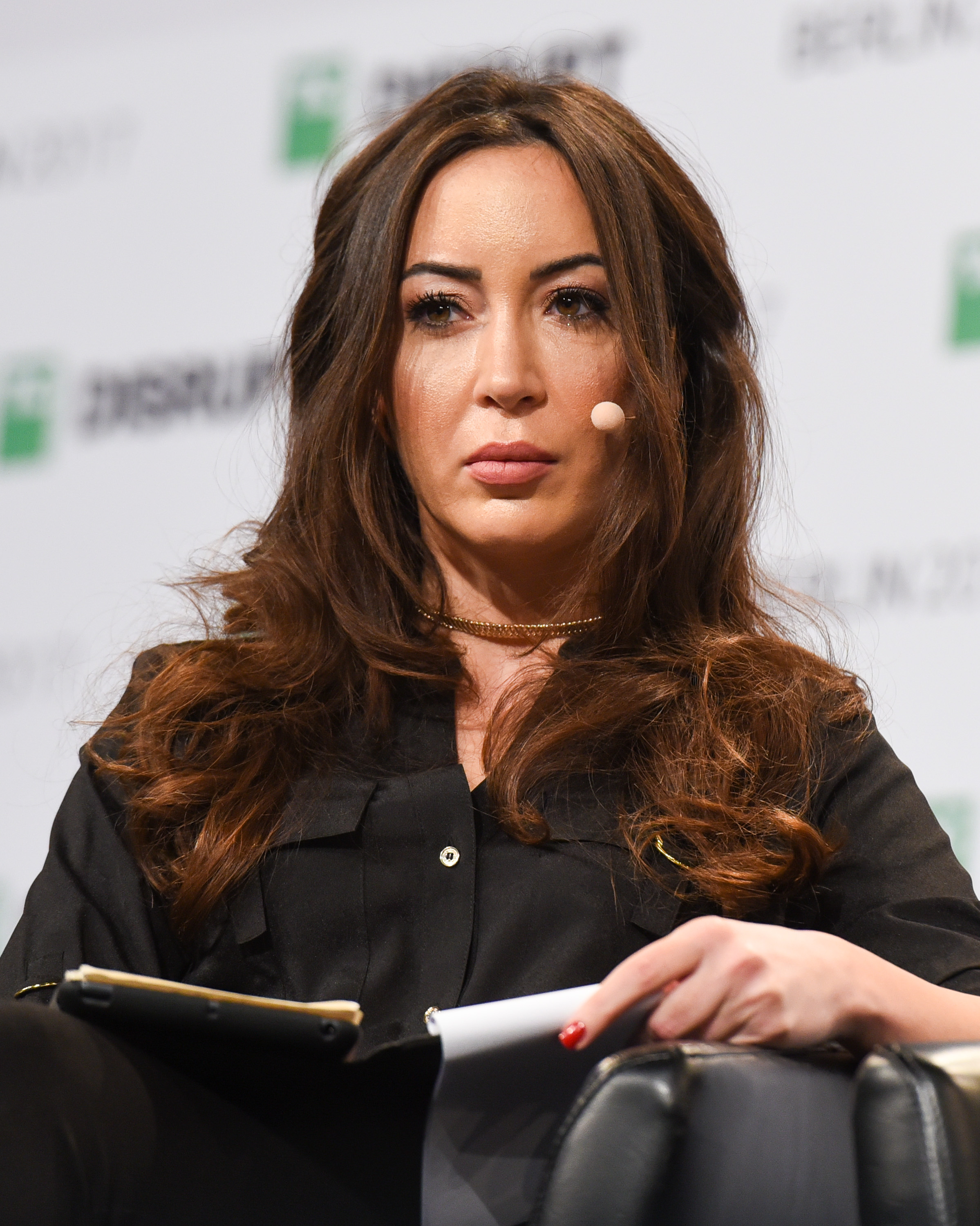
- Tugce Ergul talks at TechCrunch Disrupt Berlin in 2017
- Born: Turkey
- Education: Sorbonne
- Occupations: Entrepreneur, investor
- Known for: Founder and CEO of Angel Labs
- Website: Tugce Ergul on LinkedIn

Tugce Ergul is the founder of Angel Labs, the world's first investor accelerator. She educates potential investors around the world about angel investing.

== Early career ==
Ergul was born and grew up in Turkey. She obtained an undergraduate degree in Finance from Sorbonne and a master's degree in International Management from Bocconi University. Ergul worked in investment banking for Rothschild and coordinated Startup Weekend in Southern Europe. She came to the United States to launch Startup Labs, a Silicon Valley seed-stage investment fund helping portfolio companies launch and grow in emerging markets.

== Angel Labs ==
After investing in 30 countries, Ergul concluded that there was a lack of global investors, especially at the growth stage, and a lack of education among the existing investors and startups. Only 5% of entrepreneurs from emerging markets visiting San Francisco managed to secure venture capital for their companies abroad. To tackle the problem as an investor, she launched Angel Labs with some of her team members in 2013 and became the CEO. Their goal was to foster technological innovation through mentorship, education and funding. Angel Labs was the world's first investor accelerator.

In its first year, Ergul's team visited 25 countries and educated 2,000 potential investors (CEOs and executives, or members of family offices), half of which formed an angel network, started a venture fund, or made a first investment by 2015. In 2015, Angel Labs hosted events to identify and educate potential investors in 25 countries and created 11 angel networks.

After initially focusing on emerging markets, the company broadened its operations in Europe and the United States. Angel Labs had 40 employees in 2016. By the end of 2017, Ergul had managed investments of $100 million in 40 countries.

== Awards and recognition ==
Ergul was named to the 2018 Forbes 30 Under 30 Europe in the Finance category.

She made it into the Fortune Turkey 40 Under 40 list for 2016.
