= Aklan's at-large congressional district =

Legislative district of the Philippines

Aklan's at-large congressional district refers to the lone congressional district of the Philippines in the province of Aklan. It was represented by a single member in the House of Representatives of the Philippines who was elected provincewide at-large from 1957 until its reapportionment in 2018. The district was created following the establishment of Aklan as a regular province separate from Capiz on April 25, 1956 through Republic Act No. 1414. Before 1956, its territories were represented in the national legislatures as part of Capiz's at-large, 2nd and 3rd districts. It was a single-member district for the final four legislatures of the Third Philippine Republic from 1957 to 1972, the national parliament of the Fourth Philippine Republic from 1984 to 1986, and the 8th to 17th congresses of the Fifth Philippine Republic from 1987 to 2019.

After the 2018 reapportionment, all representatives have been elected from Aklan's 1st and 2nd districts. It was last represented by Carlito S. Marquez of the Nationalist People's Coalition (NPC).

== Representation history ==
#	Image	Member	Term of office		Congress	Party	Electoral history
#	Image	Member	Start	End	Congress	Party	Electoral history
=== Aklan's at-large district for the House of Representatives of the Philippines ===
District created April 25, 1956.
1		José B. Legaspi	December 30, 1957	December 30, 1961	4th	Nacionalista	Elected in 1957.
2		Godofredo P. Ramos	December 30, 1961	December 30, 1965	5th	Nacionalista	Elected in 1961.
2		Godofredo P. Ramos	December 30, 1961	December 30, 1965	5th	Liberal	Elected in 1961.
3		Rafael B. Legaspi	December 30, 1965	September 23, 1972	6th	Nacionalista	Elected in 1965.
3		Rafael B. Legaspi	December 30, 1965	September 23, 1972	7th	Nacionalista	Re-elected in 1969. Removed from office after imposition of martial law.
District dissolved into the sixteen-seat Region VI's at-large district for the Interim Batasang Pambansa.
#	Image	Member	Term of office		Batasang Pambansa	Party	Electoral history
#	Image	Member	Start	End	Batasang Pambansa	Party	Electoral history
=== Aklan's at-large district for the Regular Batasang Pambansa ===
District re-created February 1, 1984.
(3)		Rafael B. Legaspi	July 23, 1984	March 25, 1986	2nd	UNIDO	Elected in 1984.
#	Image	Member	Term of office		Congress	Party	Electoral history
#	Image	Member	Start	End	Congress	Party	Electoral history
=== Aklan's at-large district for the House of Representatives of the Philippines ===
District re-created February 2, 1987.
4		Ramon B. Legaspi	June 30, 1987	June 30, 1992	8th	Lakas ng Bansa	Elected in 1987.
4		Ramon B. Legaspi	June 30, 1987	June 30, 1992	8th	NPC	Elected in 1987.
5		Allen S. Quimpo	June 30, 1992	June 30, 2001	9th	LDP	Elected in 1992.
5		Allen S. Quimpo	June 30, 1992	June 30, 2001	10th	Lakas	Re-elected in 1995.
5		Allen S. Quimpo	June 30, 1992	June 30, 2001	11th	LAMMP	Re-elected in 1998.
6		Gabrielle V. Calizo-Quimpo	June 30, 2001	June 30, 2004	12th	LDP	Elected in 2001.
7		Florencio Miraflores	June 30, 2004	June 30, 2013	13th	Liberal	Elected in 2004.
7		Florencio Miraflores	June 30, 2004	June 30, 2013	14th	Lakas	Re-elected in 2007.
7		Florencio Miraflores	June 30, 2004	June 30, 2013	15th	Liberal	Re-elected in 2010.
8		Teodorico T. Haresco Jr.	June 30, 2013	June 30, 2016	16th	Independent	Elected in 2013.
8		Teodorico T. Haresco Jr.	June 30, 2013	June 30, 2016	16th	Nacionalista	Elected in 2013.
9		Carlito S. Marquez	June 30, 2016	June 30, 2019	17th	NPC	Elected in 2016. Redistricted to the 1st district.
District dissolved into Aklan's 1st and 2nd districts.

== See also ==
- Legislative districts of Aklan
