= Florencio Miraflores =

Filipino politician

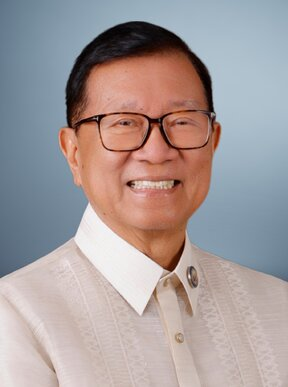
- Official portrait, 2025

Member of the Philippine House of Representatives from Aklan
- Incumbent
- Assumed office June 30, 2025
- Preceded by: Teodorico T. Haresco, Jr.
- Constituency: 2nd district
- In office June 30, 2004 – June 30, 2013
- Preceded by: Gabrielle Calizo-Quimpo
- Succeeded by: Teodorico T. Haresco, Jr.
- Constituency: At-large district

13th Governor of Aklan
- In office June 30, 2013 – June 30, 2022
- Vice Governor: Gabrielle Calizo-Quimpo (2013–2016); Reynaldo M. Quimpo (2016–2022)
- Preceded by: Carlito S. Marquez
- Succeeded by: Jose Enrique Miraflores
- In office June 30, 1995 – June 30, 2004
- Vice Governor: Jean Rodriguez
- Preceded by: Corazon Legaspi-Cabagnot
- Succeeded by: Carlito S. Marquez

Mayor of Ibajay
- In office June 30, 1988 – June 30, 1995
- Preceded by: Florante Ascano
- Succeeded by: Pedro Garcia

Personal details
- Born: 1 July 1951 (age 75) Ibajay, Capiz, Philippines
- Party: NPC (2024–present)
- Other political affiliations: PDP–Laban (2017–2024); Liberal (1987–2007; 2009–2017); Lakas (2007–2009)
- Education: De La Salle University Manila
- Occupation: Politician, Businessman

Florencio "Joeben" Tumbocon Miraflores (born July 1, 1951) is a Filipino politician. Miraflores was born in Ibajay, Aklan to parents Dr. Jose Conlu Miraflores and Eusebia Tumbocon. He is married to Ma. Lourdes Villanueva Martin. He graduated valedictorian at St. Clement's College, Iloilo and finished Industrial and Management Engineering at De La Salle University. He was Mayor of Ibajay from 1988 to 1995, and Governor of Aklan from 1995 to 2004 and from 2013 to 2022.

== Early life and education ==
Florencio Tumbocon Miraflores was born on July 1, 1951, on Ibajay, then in the province of Capiz. He is the firstborn and only son of Dr. Jose Miraflores, a one-time mayor of Ibajay. He had two younger sisters. He completed his primary education at Naisud Elementary School, he was a valedictorian in his secondary education at the St. Clement's College at Iloilo and studied at the De La Salle University, gaining a degree in industrial and management engineering.

== Early career ==
Miraflores was the Training and Information Office of the Provincial Development Staff from 1972 to 1975. He served as the Human Settlements Officer of the Ministry of Human Settlements for ibajay for two years. He was then the Provincial Manager for Aklan for the Ministry of Human Settlements in 1981 and became the Regional Manager in 1984, ending in 1987.

== Political career ==
He ran for mayor of Ibajay in 1987, winning by a landslide. He ran again in 1992, winning. He then ran for Governor of Aklan in the 1995 elections, winning by a landslide. He ran again in 1998 and 2001, winning. He became chairman of the Aklan Provincial Tourism Development Special Task Force. He was then picked as chairman of the Regional Peace and Order Council of Region VI in 2001. In the 2004 Philippine House of Representatives elections, he ran for the Lone district of Aklan, winning. He ran again in the 2007 Philippine House of Representatives elections.

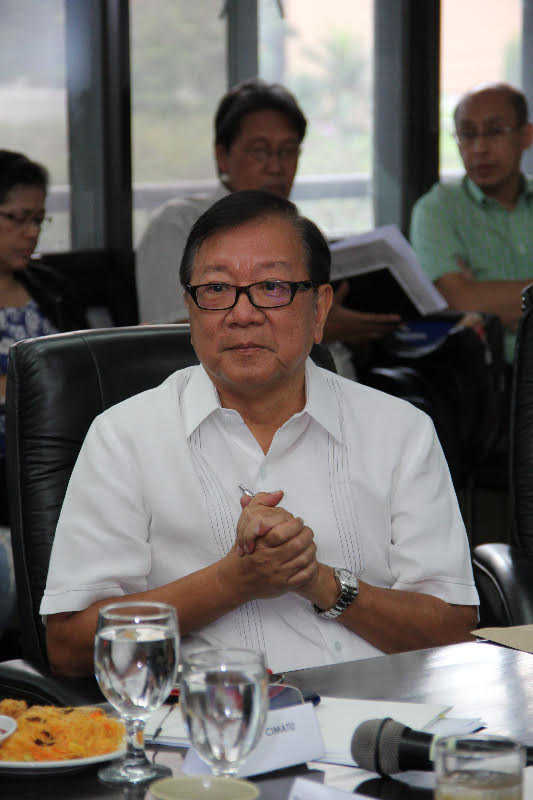
Gov. Joeben Miraflores in 2018.

During his term in the 14th Congress of the Philippines, he was the vice chairman of the Philippine House Committee on Tourism. In the 15th Congress of the Philippines, he was elected as a chairman in the committee of Tourism. He ran in the 2013 Philippine House of Representatives elections, winning again. During his term, he implemented participatory decision making.

In the 2025 Philippine House of Representatives elections, he ran for Aklan's 2nd congressional district against his cousin. He ran under the Nationalist People's Coalition. He won with 88,795 votes, 21.40 percent of the votes, slightly beating his cousin Nonong Haresco.

== Personal life ==
On June 29, 2008, Miraflores was rushed to a hospital in Kalibo, Aklan after complaining of chest pains and difficulty in breathing; initial tests indicated that his heartbeat was irregular. At the time he was stricken ill, Miraflores had been engaged in relief operations for his province, which had been devastated by Typhoon Fengshen (Frank).

House of Representatives of the Philippines
Preceded by Teodorico T. Haresco Jr.	Representative, Aklan's 2nd District; 2025–present	Incumbent
Preceded by Gabrielle Calizo-Quimpo	Representative, Aklan's Lone District; 2004–2013	Succeeded by Teodorico T. Haresco Jr.
Political offices
Preceded by Carlito S. Marquez	Governor of Aklan; 2013–2022; 1995–2004	Succeeded by Jose Enrique Miraflores
Preceded by Corazon Legaspi-Cabagnot	Governor of Aklan; 2013–2022; 1995–2004	Succeeded by Carlito S. Marquez
Preceded by Florante Ascano	Mayor of Ibajay; 1988–1995	Succeeded by Pedro Garcia
