= New Washington, Aklan =

Municipality in Aklan, Philippines

New Washington Fonda Lagatic
- Municipality
- Municipality of New Washington
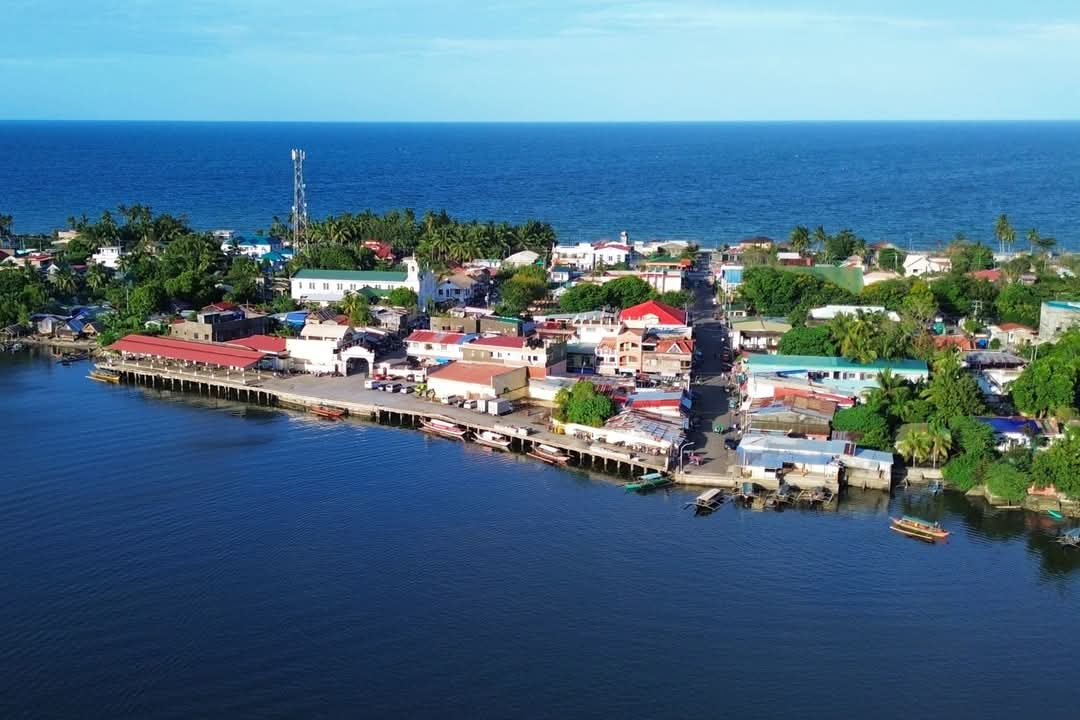

- Flag Seal
- Nickname: Seafood Capital of Aklan
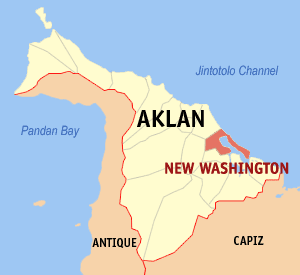
- Map of Aklan with New Washington highlighted
- Interactive map of New Washington
- Location within the Philippines
- Coordinates: 11°38′54″N 122°26′02″E
- Country: Philippines
- Region: Western Visayas
- Province: Aklan
- District: 1st district
- Founded: January 15, 1904
- Named for: George Washington
- Barangays: 16 (see Barangays)

Government
  - Type: Sangguniang Bayan
  - Mayor: Atty. Shimonette P. Francisco
  - Vice Mayor: Jesus "Molot" B. Quimpo
  - Representative: Carlito S. Marquez
  - Municipal Council: Members: Esboy Quimpo; Diosilio "Jojo" F. Malonosan; Pitche Joy Alfaro; Roly O. Equiña Jr.; Jazel P. Bautista; Janeth Dela Cruz; Estrella "Neneng" Velarde; Allan Bernardino
  - Electorate: 33,891 voters (2025)

Area
  - Total: 66.69 km^{2} (25.75 sq mi)
- Elevation: 13 m (43 ft)
- Highest elevation: 329 m (1,079 ft)
- Lowest elevation: 0 m (0 ft)

Population (2024 census)
  - Total: 49,204
  - Density: 737.8/km^{2} (1,911/sq mi)
  - Households: 11,933

Economy
  - Income class: 2nd municipal income class
  - Poverty incidence: 6.45% (2023)
  - Revenue: ₱ 203.2 million (2024)
  - Assets: ₱ 549 million (2024)
  - Expenditure: ₱ 193.3 million (2024)
  - Liabilities: ₱ 80.56 million (2024)

Service provider
  - Electricity: Aklan Electric Cooperative (AKELCO)
- Time zone: UTC+8 (PST)
- ZIP code: 5610
- PSGC: 060415000
- IDD : area code: +63 (0)36
- Native languages: Aklanon; Hiligaynon; Capisnon; Tagalog

New Washington, officially the Municipality of New Washington (Aklanon: Banwa it New Washington; Hiligaynon: Banwa sang New Washington; Tagalog: Bayan ng Bagong Washington), is a municipality in the province of Aklan, Philippines. According to the 2024 census, it has a population of 49,204 people.

It is known as the "Seafood Capital of Aklan". It is also the home of the National Shrine of Sanduguan, commemorating the heroes who made a blood compact Pacto de Sangre ("Blood Compact" in Spanish) which started the anti-Spanish revolution in the province of Aklan on March 3, 1897; consequently, it is also the home of the Sanduguan Festival, celebrated every March 3, the anniversary of the blood compact.

== Etymology ==
Established on January 15, 1904, the municipality was named after the first president of the United States, George Washington, as a tribute to the Thomasites, a group of American teachers who in the early 1900s established a new public education system in the Philippines, taught basic education, and trained Filipino teachers with English as medium of instruction. The municipality was formerly called Fonda Lagatic, which was derived from the Lagatik River that stretches along some of the municipality's barangays at a length of 9.6 kilometers (6.0 mi).

== Geography ==
New Washington is located at 11°38′54″N 122°26′02″E.

According to the Philippine Statistics Authority, the municipality has a land area of 66.69 square kilometers (25.75 sq mi) constituting 3.66% of the 1,821.42-square-kilometer- (703.25 sq mi) total area of Aklan.

New Washington is bounded by Batan in the east, Kalibo in the west and the Sibuyan Sea on the north. It is 7 kilometers (4.3 mi) from Kalibo International Airport, 9 kilometers (5.6 mi) from the province's capital town of Kalibo, and one and a half (1 1/2) hours away from Boracay Island.

=== Climate ===
Climate data for New Washington, Aklan
Month	Jan	Feb	Mar	Apr	May	Jun	Jul	Aug	Sep	Oct	Nov	Dec	Year
Mean daily maximum °C (°F)	28 (82)	29 (84)	30 (86)	32 (90)	32 (90)	31 (88)	30 (86)	30 (86)	29 (84)	29 (84)	29 (84)	28 (82)	30 (86)
Mean daily minimum °C (°F)	23 (73)	22 (72)	23 (73)	24 (75)	25 (77)	25 (77)	25 (77)	24 (75)	25 (77)	24 (75)	24 (75)	23 (73)	24 (75)
Average precipitation mm (inches)	47 (1.9)	33 (1.3)	39 (1.5)	48 (1.9)	98 (3.9)	150 (5.9)	169 (6.7)	147 (5.8)	163 (6.4)	172 (6.8)	118 (4.6)	80 (3.1)	1,264 (49.8)
Average rainy days	11.4	8.2	9.3	9.7	19.1	25.6	27.4	25.5	25.5	25.2	18.5	14.5	219.9
Source: Meteoblue

The third type of climate predominates in the locality, season not pronounced. It is relatively dry from February to July and wet the rest of the year.

To deal with water supply on the peninsula, which was affected by salt water intrusion and related endemic amoebiasis, New Washington was the site of a U.S. Peace Corps-sponsored program to build over 200 low-cost circular water wells. The wells used locally produced "curved hollow blocks" made with custom wooden forms inspired by a local medical doctor and social activist, Andronico "Andrew" Mendoza. Mendoza organized families to transport individual pre-cast custom hollow blocks to remote areas; the design of the wells obviated the need for steel bar reinforcement. During the early 1980s, 212 water wells were dug and constructed throughout the municipality with voluntary community effort ("bayanihan"). They are still in use.

=== Barangays ===
New Washington is politically subdivided into 16 barangays. Each barangay consists of puroks and some have sitios.

PSGC	Barangay	Population			±% p.a.	
		2024		2010		
060415001	Candelaria	3.5%	1,708	1,626	▴	0.34%
060415002	Cawayan	8.5%	4,168	3,784	▴	0.67%
060415003	Dumaguit	4.3%	2,139	1,996	▴	0.48%
060415004	Fatima	2.5%	1,219	1,182	▴	0.21%
060415005	Guinbaliwan	6.2%	3,031	2,813	▴	0.52%
060415006	Jalas	3.1%	1,518	1,648	▾	−0.57%
060415007	Jugas	5.2%	2,577	2,427	▴	0.42%
060415008	Lawa-an	2.8%	1,361	1,414	▾	−0.26%
060415009	Mabilo	7.2%	3,552	3,035	▴	1.10%
060415010	Mataphao	3.7%	1,842	1,554	▴	1.19%
060415011	Ochando	6.8%	3,369	3,028	▴	0.74%
060415012	Pinamuk-an	6.0%	2,951	2,692	▴	0.64%
060415013	Poblacion	12.1%	5,974	6,036	▾	−0.07%
060415014	Polo	7.1%	3,514	3,476	▴	0.08%
060415015	Puis	5.4%	2,675	2,360	▴	0.87%
060415017	Tambak	6.9%	3,409	3,041	▴	0.80%
	Total		49,204	42,112	▴	1.09%

To some locals, the barangays are grouped into two, namely "Eanas" or "Interior" and "Baybay" or "Coastal". The barangays that belong to Eanas are those involved in rice farming such as Mabilo, Puis, Jalas, Guinbaliwan, Mataphao, Candelaria, Lawa-an and Jugas. Baybay, on the other hand, covers barangays along or near the coastline, consisting of Tambac, Poblacion, Pinamuk-an, Polo, Cawayan, Ochando, Fatima and Dumaguit.

Common among municipalities in the Philippines, the seat of local government and the center of business are situated in Poblacion. It is also home to the Municipal Auditorium and Sports Complex, Manuel C. Peralta Community Center, where major events of the town are held.

== Demographics ==
Population census of New Washington
Year	Pop.	±% p.a.
1918	24,453	—
1939	12,192	−3.26%
1948	13,370	+1.03%
1960	15,966	+1.49%
1970	19,131	+1.82%
1975	22,131	+2.96%
1980	26,119	+3.37%
1990	30,147	+1.44%
1995	31,896	+1.06%
2000	33,981	+1.37%
2007	39,656	+2.15%
2010	42,112	+2.21%
2015	45,007	+1.27%
2020	47,955	+1.34%
2024	49,204	+0.62%
Source: Philippine Statistics Authority

In the 2024 census, New Washington had a population of 49,204 people. The population density was 740 inhabitants per square kilometre (1,900/sq mi).

Majority of the New Washingtonians, as the municipality's residents are sometimes called, are of Aklanon origin. Immigration, generally, is due to marriage and employment.

=== Languages ===
New Washingtonians speak in Aklanon, Hiligaynon, Tagalog, and English; the former being their primary medium. Aklanon, as a language, is often described as a cross between Bisaya, Hiligaynon, and Karay-a making it quite complex for local and foreign tourists to speak and comprehend. This is not seen as a problem, considering that residents can speak fluent Hiligaynon, Tagalog, and English.

=== Religion ===
The people of New Washington are predominantly Christians. Religious denominations in the municipality include Roman Catholic Church, Philippine Independent Church, Baptist churches, Iglesia ni Cristo, Seventh-day Adventist Church, Jehovah's Witnesses and the Church of Jesus Christ of Latter-day Saints, among others.

== Economy ==
Poverty incidence of New Washington (%)

Source: Philippine Statistics Authority

As New Washington is surrounded by bodies of water such as Sibuyan Sea and Lagatik River. Fishing has been the leading livelihood among the people, alongside rice farming. The town has the largest area of ricefields among the municipalities in Aklan.

The municipality operates two ports: one in Dumaguit and the other in Poblacion. The port in Dumaguit caters to passenger and commercial boats, while the port in Poblacion is only for the latter. Both ports serve as major trade routes between the province of Aklan and Manila.

== Education ==
The New Washington Schools District Office governs all educational institutions within the municipality. It oversees the management and operations of all private and public, from primary to secondary schools.

All the barangays have either an elementary or primary school. There are four secondary schools: New Washington National Comprehensive High School and Montfort Technical Institute (MTI) in Poblacion, Candelaria National High School in Candelaria and Ochando National High School in Ochando. Montessori de Aklan (MDA), a primary school, is a branch of Montessori de Zamboanga Schools which is an affiliate of AMS or American Montessori Society in Polo, Tertiary education is centered at Aklan State University - College of Fisheries and Marine Sciences, which is located in Poblacion. Vocational courses are also offered at MTI. Some families send their children to schools in Kalibo, Capiz, Iloilo and Manila, among others.

=== Primary and elementary schools ===
- Candelaria Elementary School
- Cawayan Elementary School
- Celestial Love Center
- Christ the King School
- Don Basilio Refundo Memorial School
- Dumaguit Elementary School
- Guinbaliwan Elementary School
- IFI Holy Rosary Kinder School
- Jalas Elementary School
- Jugas Elementary School
- Lawa-an Elementary School
- Mabilo Elementary School
- Montessori De Aklan School
- Montfort Technical Institute
- New Washington Elementary School
- Ochando Elementary School
- Pinamuk-an Integrated School
- Polo Elementary School
- Polo Youngsters Learning Center
- Precious Faith Learning Center
- Puis Elementary School
- Tambak Elementary School
- Tomas SM Bautista Elementary School (Fatima Elementary School)

=== Secondary schools ===
- Candelaria National High School
- Montfort Technical Institute
- New Washington National Comprehensive High School
- Ochando National High School
- Pinamuk-an Integrated School

== Holidays ==
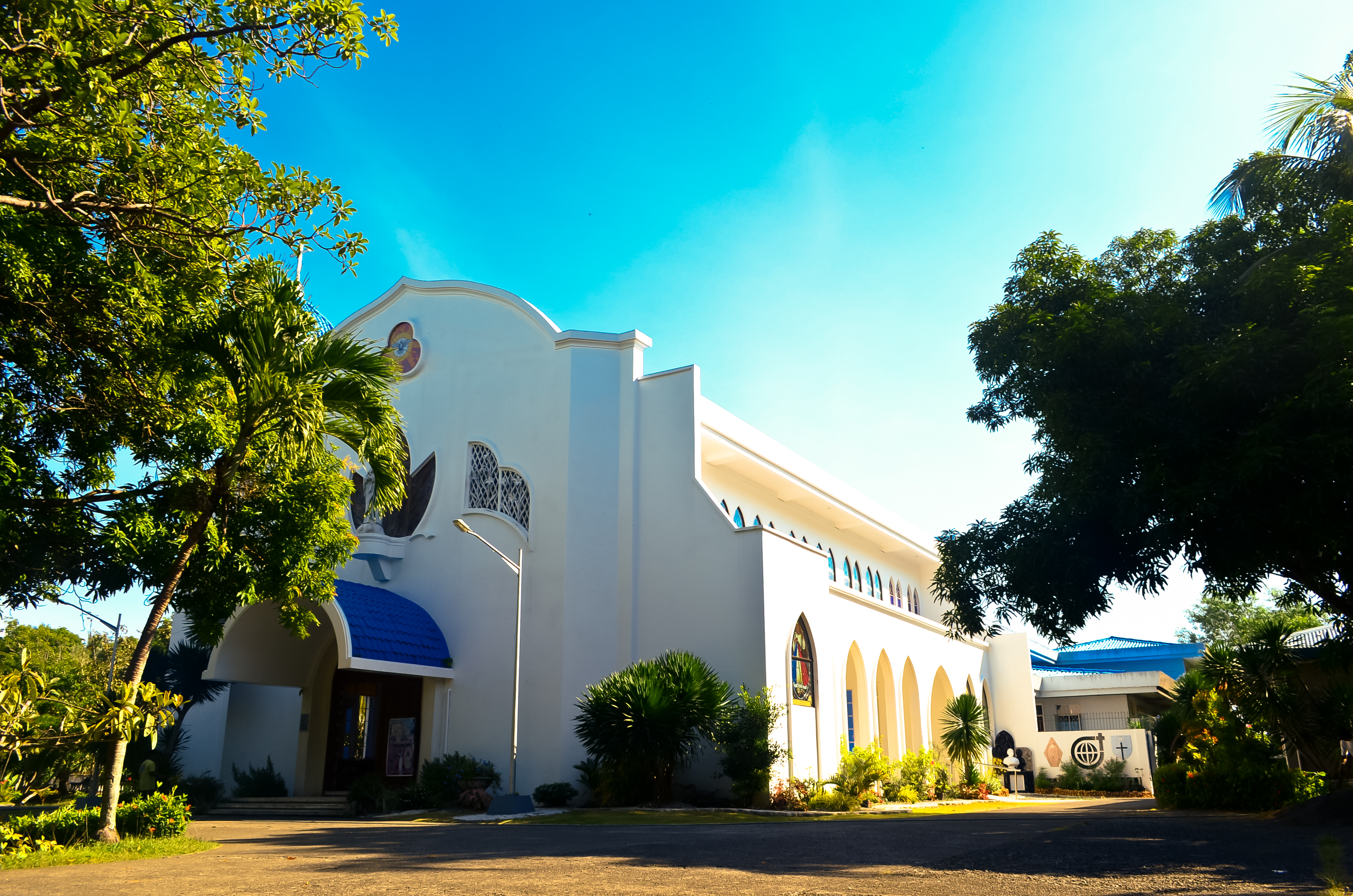
Pink Sisters' Convent

New Washington observes two annual fiestas as a town. One is a patronal fiesta in honor of Our Lady of the Most Holy Rosary, which is held on the second Saturday of October and the other is a civic fiesta commemorating the heroes of Pacto de Sangre, which is held from March 1 to 3. The Pacto de Sangre, or blood compact, took place in the then Sitio Kuntang (now Barangay Ochando) on March 3, 1897.

== Tourism ==
The municipality has numerous beach resorts located near the shores from Mabilo to Dumaguit. Civic attractions include the Jaime Cardinal L. Sin Park, the Rizal Park, the Municipal Children's Park and the Municipal Auditorium and Sports Complex.

The town also hosts the Museo Kardinal, a museum dedicated to the life of Cardinal Jaime Sin established inside his former residence.

== Notable personalities ==
- Jaime Sin, former Archbishop of Manila
