= Jess Marquez =

Jesus Marquez
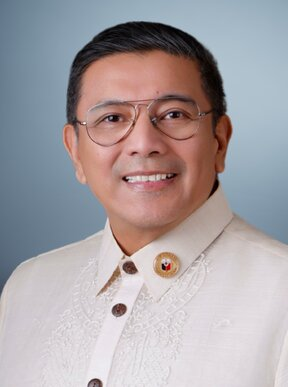
- Official portrait, 2025

Member of the Philippine House of Representatives from Aklan's 1st District
- Incumbent
- Assumed office June 30, 2025
- Preceded by: Carlito Marquez

Personal details
- Born: Jesus Ricaforte Marquez; May 17, 1970 (age 56) Manila, Philippines
- Party: NPC (2025–present)
- Education: De La Salle University
- Occupation: Businessman

Jesus Ricaforte Marquez (born May 17, 1970), also known as Jess Marquez, is a Filipino businessman who has served as the representative for the first congressional district of Aklan since 2025.

== Early life ==
Jesus Marquez was born on May 17, 1970, in Manila. His father was former Representative Carlito Marquez.

== Career ==
Prior to being involved in politics, he served as the president of JJacobs Co. From 2022 to 2025, he served as the chief of staff of his father Carlito. In the 2025 Philippine House of Representatives elections, he ran for Aklan's 1st congressional district under the Nationalist People's Coalition. He won with 88,054 votes, 21.22 percent of the votes, beating his opponent by a three percent margin.

House of Representatives of the Philippines
Preceded by Carlito Marquez	Representative, 1st District of Aklan; 2025–present	Incumbent
