= Governor of Aklan =

Local chief executive

- Gobernador ng Aklan (Filipino)
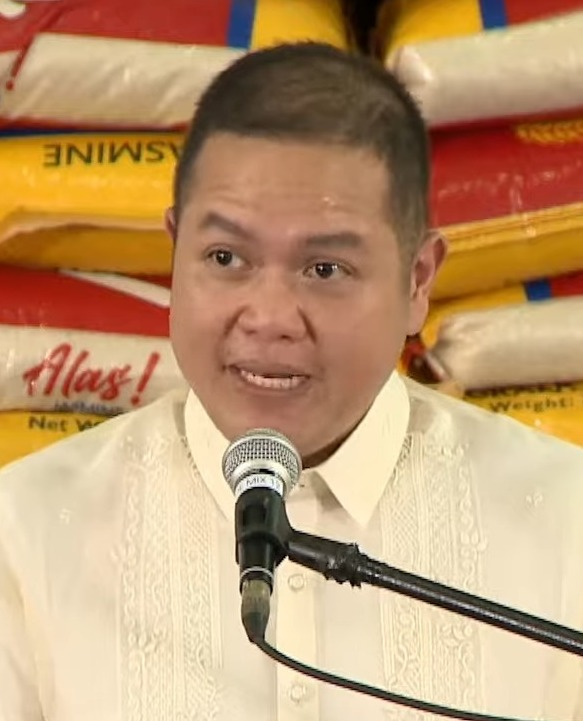
- Incumbent; Jose Enrique "Joen" Miraflores since June 30, 2022
- Style: The Honourable
- Residence: Aklan Provincial Capitol, Kalibo, Aklan
- Term length: 3 years, not eligible for re-election immediately after three consecutive terms
- Inaugural holder: Jose Raz Meñez
- Formation: 1956

The governor of Aklan is the local chief executive of the province of Aklan, Philippines.

== Governors ==
No.	Image	Governor	Took office	Left office	Party	Local Party	Remarks
1		Jose Raz Meñez (Appointed)	1956	1959			Appointed by President Magsaysay
2		Godofredo Ramos	1960	1962			
3		Virgilio Patricio	1962	1963			
4		Jose Legaspi	1964	1971			
5		Roberto Garcia	1972	1986			
6		Bonifacio Garcia	1986	1987			
7		Benhur Mobo (OIC)	1987	1987			
8		Augusto Legaspi (OIC)	1987	1987			
9		Jolie Pelayo	1987	1987			
10		Emiliano Fernandez (OIC)	1987	1988			
11		Job Parohinog (OIC)	January 6, 1988	February 1, 1988			
12		Corazon Legaspi-Cabagnot	February 1, 1988	June 30, 1995	Lakas		
13		Florencio Miraflores	June 30, 1995	June 30, 2004	Liberal	Tibyog Akean	
14		Carlito Marquez	June 30, 2004	June 30, 2013	KAMPI	Tibyog Akean	
(13)		Florencio Miraflores	June 30, 2013	June 30, 2022	Liberal	Tibyog Akean	
15		Jose Enrique Miraflores	June 30, 2022	Incumbent Governor	PDP-Laban		
