= Balete, Aklan =

Municipality in Aklan, Philippines

Balete
- Municipality
- Municipality of Balete
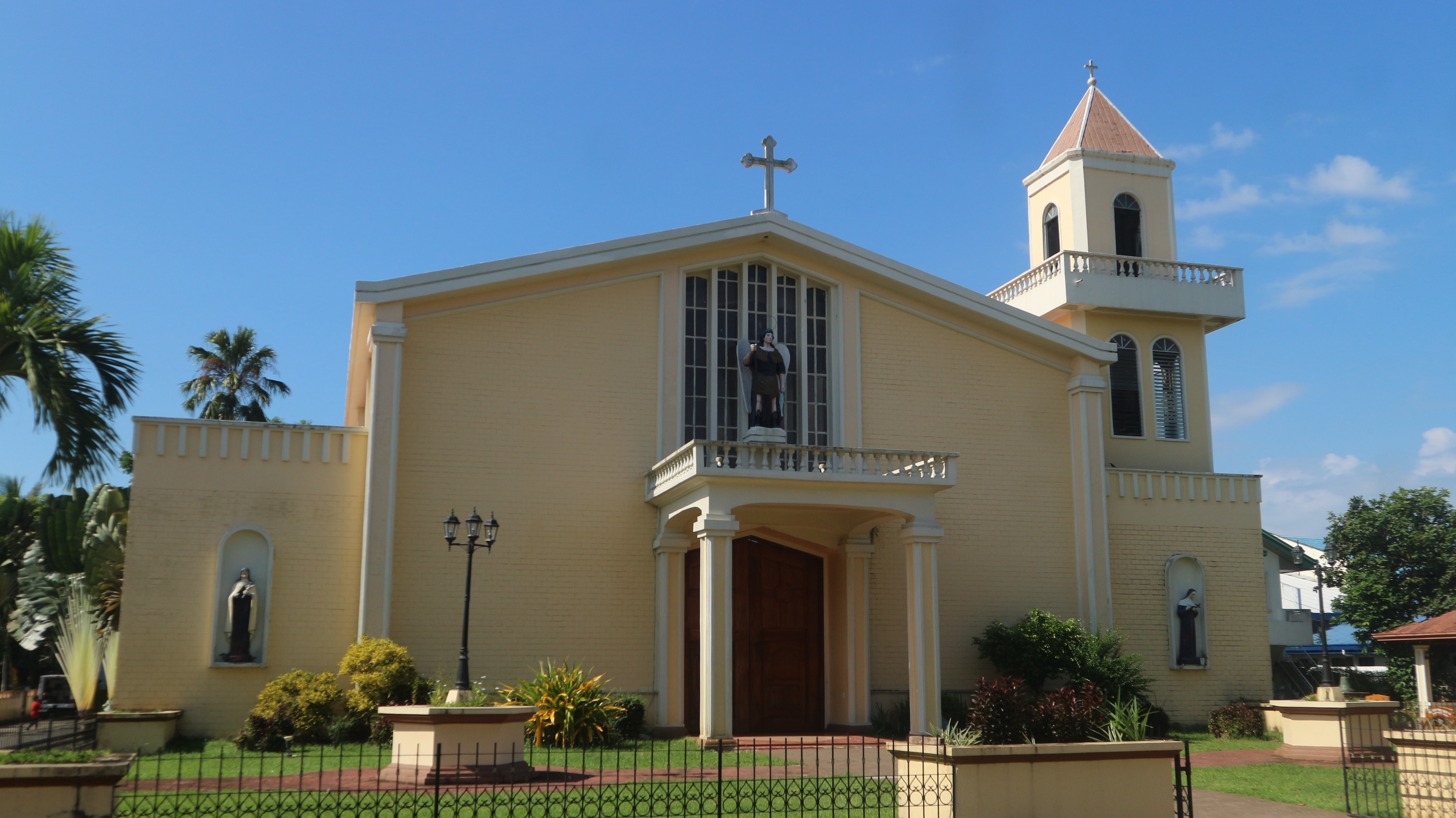
- Church of Balete

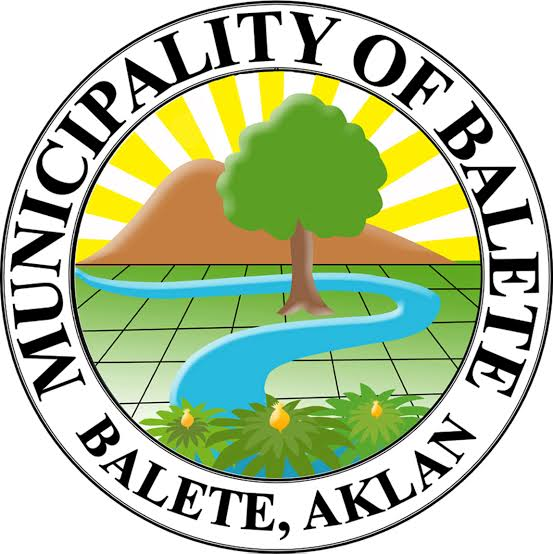
- Flag Seal

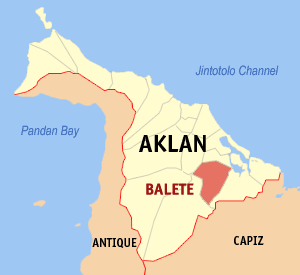
- Map of Aklan with Balete highlighted
- Interactive map of Balete
- Location within the Philippines
- Coordinates: 11°33′19″N 122°22′45″E
- Country: Philippines
- Region: Western Visayas
- Province: Aklan
- District: 1st district
- Barangays: 10 (see Barangays)

Government
  - Type: Sangguniang Bayan
  - Mayor: Prescilla Calizo
  - Vice Mayor: Patrick F. Lachica
  - Representative: Jesus Marquez
  - Municipal Council: Members: Inocentes F. Bantigue Jr.; Roman R. Villaruel; Jose Roger D. Feliciano; Evelyn V. Villanueva; Agnes D. Recidoro; Karl V. Yasa; Rex C. delos Reyes; Ralph B. Cleope
  - Electorate: 17,585 voters (2025)

Area
  - Total: 118.93 km^{2} (45.92 sq mi)
- Elevation: 144 m (472 ft)
- Highest elevation: 1,568 m (5,144 ft)
- Lowest elevation: 0 m (0 ft)

Population (2024 census)
  - Total: 30,310
  - Density: 254.9/km^{2} (660.1/sq mi)
  - Households: 2,242

Economy
  - Income class: 3rd municipal income class
  - Poverty incidence: 11.36% (2023)
  - Revenue: ₱ 164.6 million (2024)
  - Assets: ₱ 550.6 million (2024)
  - Expenditure: ₱ 85.48 million (2024)
  - Liabilities: ₱ 92.57 million (2024)

Service provider
  - Electricity: Aklan Electric Cooperative (AKELCO)
- Time zone: UTC+8 (PST)
- ZIP code: 5614
- PSGC: 060402000
- IDD : area code: +63 (0)36
- Native languages: Aklanon; Hiligaynon; Capisnon; Tagalog
- Website: baleteaklan.gov.ph

Balete, officially the Municipality of Balete (Aklanon: Banwa it Balete; Hiligaynon: Banwa sang Balete; Tagalog: Bayan ng Balete), is a municipality in the province of Aklan, Philippines. According to the 2024 census, it has a population of 30,310 people.

== Geography ==
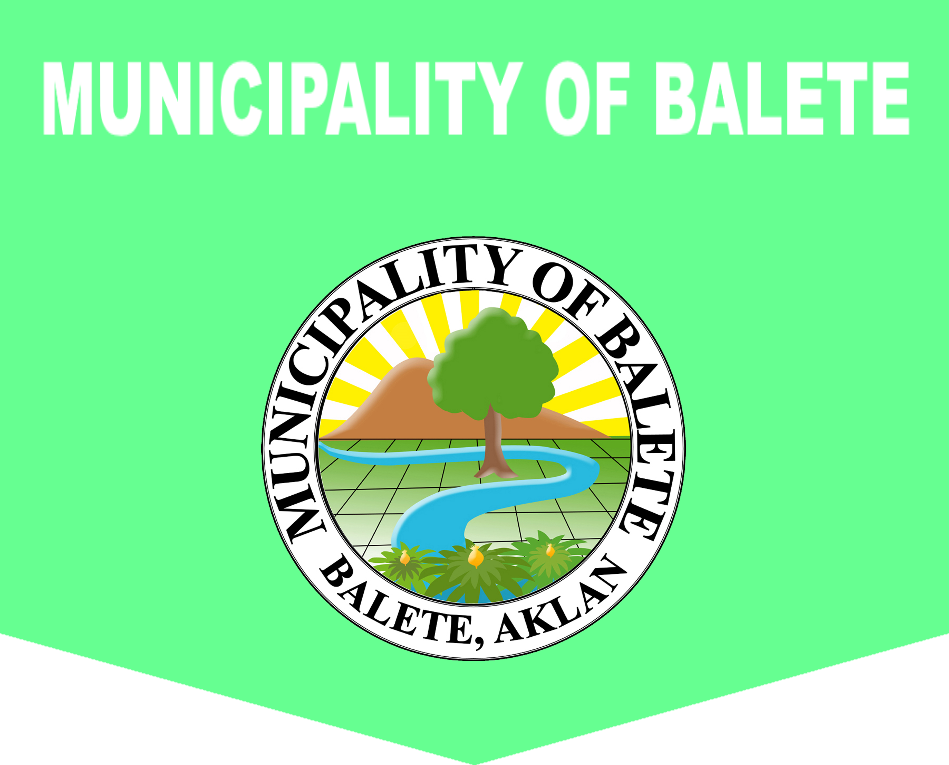
Alternate flag of Balete

Balete is 21 kilometres (13 mi) from Kalibo, the provincial capital.

According to the Philippine Statistics Authority, the municipality has a land area of 118.93 square kilometres (45.92 sq mi) constituting 6.53% of the 1,821.42-square-kilometre- (703.25 sq mi) total area of Aklan.

=== Barangays ===
Balete is politically subdivided into 10 barangays. Each barangay consists of puroks and some have sitios.

Fulgencio was formerly known as Morthon.

PSGC	Barangay	Population			±% p.a.	
		2024		2010		
060402001	Aranas	17.3%	5,256	5,083	▴	0.23%
060402002	Arcangel	11.5%	3,486	3,454	▴	0.06%
060402004	Calizo	12.7%	3,863	3,773	▴	0.16%
060402005	Cortes	10.8%	3,278	2,872	▴	0.92%
060402006	Feliciano	9.5%	2,883	2,788	▴	0.23%
060402007	Fulgencio	11.8%	3,568	3,230	▴	0.69%
060402008	Guanko	4.4%	1,321	1,322	▾	−0.01%
060402009	Morales	10.5%	3,184	2,619	▴	1.37%
060402010	Oquendo	4.1%	1,234	1,226	▴	0.05%
060402011	Poblacion	2.8%	847	830	▴	0.14%
	Total		30,310	27,197	▴	0.76%

=== Climate ===
Climate data for Balete, Aklan
Month	Jan	Feb	Mar	Apr	May	Jun	Jul	Aug	Sep	Oct	Nov	Dec	Year
Mean daily maximum °C (°F)	28 (82)	29 (84)	30 (86)	32 (90)	32 (90)	31 (88)	30 (86)	30 (86)	29 (84)	29 (84)	29 (84)	28 (82)	30 (86)
Mean daily minimum °C (°F)	23 (73)	22 (72)	23 (73)	24 (75)	25 (77)	25 (77)	25 (77)	24 (75)	24 (75)	24 (75)	24 (75)	23 (73)	24 (75)
Average precipitation mm (inches)	47 (1.9)	33 (1.3)	39 (1.5)	48 (1.9)	98 (3.9)	150 (5.9)	169 (6.7)	147 (5.8)	163 (6.4)	172 (6.8)	118 (4.6)	80 (3.1)	1,264 (49.8)
Average rainy days	11.4	8.2	9.3	9.7	19.1	25.6	27.4	25.5	25.5	25.2	18.5	14.5	219.9
Source: Meteoblue (Use with caution: this is modeled/calculated data, not measured locally.)

== Demographics ==
Population census of Balete
Year	Pop.	±% p.a.
1903	5,529	—
1939	9,508	+1.52%
1948	10,835	+1.46%
1960	12,677	+1.32%
1970	14,310	+1.22%
1975	15,827	+2.04%
1980	17,300	+1.80%
1990	19,842	+1.38%
1995	19,972	+0.12%
2000	23,616	+3.66%
2007	26,360	+1.53%
2010	27,197	+1.14%
2015	28,920	+1.18%
2020	30,090	+0.84%
2024	30,310	+0.18%
Source: Philippine Statistics Authority

In the 2024 census, Balete had a population of 30,310. The population density was 250 inhabitants per square kilometre (650/sq mi).

== Economy ==
Poverty incidence of Balete

Source: Philippine Statistics Authority

== Culture ==
In Balete, the Aklanon people-based piña industry preserves Filipino traditional weaving. Raquel Eliserio, as its cultural master won the AGAATI's Global Eco Artisan Awards 2021. She founded a haeab-ean (weaving area) in her Barangay Feliciano and another in neighboring Tangalan. Her over a hundred looms and piña fiber knotters utilize her unique suksuk or inlay. The counted warp and weft are pulled by cotton threads, numbered with Dicranopteris linearis sticks and the piña textile is inlaid with designs.

== Landmarks ==
- Agtawagon Hill - located at the south-eastern portion of Barangay Morales, about 7 kilometres (4.3 mi) away from the town center. During the Philippine Revolution, the hill was the last line of defense of the Filipino patriots during the Spanish-Filipino conflict. The same hill had served as camp for Filipino guerrillas during Japanese occupation during the Second World War. Foxholes had been built on the summit of the hill overlooking potential enemy movement.

== Education ==
The Balete Schools District Office governs all educational institutions within the municipality. It oversees the management and operations of all private and public, from primary to secondary schools.

=== Primary and elementary schools ===
- Aranas Elementary School
- Arcangel Norte Primary School
- Arcangel Sur Elementary School
- Balete Elementary School
- Bangbang Elementary School
- Benetinan Primary School
- Calizo Elementary School
- Christ the King School
- Cortes Integrated School
- Feliciano Elementary School
- Fulgencio Norte Elementary School
- Fulgencio Sur Elementary School
- Guanco SDA Multigrade School
- Guanko Elementary School
- Maranatha Christian Academy
- Maria and Feliciano Dela Cruz Elementary School
- Morales Elementary School
- Oquendo Primary School
- Saint Raphael Parochial School

=== Secondary schools ===
- Balete Academy
- Balete Integrated School
- Calizo National High School
- Cortes Integrated School
- Fr. Julian C. Rago National High School
- Jose Borromeo Legaspi Memorial National High School
- Jose F. Meñez Memorial National High School
- Patrocinio A. Lachica Integrated School

=== Higher educational institution ===
- Balete Community College

== Notable personalities ==
- Gabrielle Calizo-Quimpo - Filipino politician
- Jonha Richman - Filipino businesswoman and philanthropist
