= StartupDigest =

Startup Digest
- Website type: email newsletter
- Available in: English
- Owners: Christopher McCann, Brendan McManus via Techstars Central LLC
- Website: https://www.startupdigest.com/
- Commercial: No
- Launched: 2009
- Current status: Active

Startup Digest is a media company that publishes curated email newsletters on startup events and educational content in more than 300 cities. Startup Digest was founded by Christopher McCann and Brendan McManus in 2009.

== History ==
After graduating from Cal Poly San Luis Obispo with an entrepreneurship degree in June 2009, McCann moved to Silicon Valley to work with Plug and Play Tech Center. McCann didn’t know anyone in the area and started going to tech events to meet people. He began compiling his own personal list of the best events in Silicon Valley and in November 2009, sent this list in an email to 22 friends.

McCann and his roommate, Brendan McManus, co-founded Startup Digest after the first email. Within 90 days, their list grew from 22 people to 12,000. They took $25,000 in initial funding, and by the end of the first year, their list reached 100,000 subscribers. In March 2011, they received an additional $200,000 in funding from the Kauffman Foundation. Currently, Startup Digest has more than 430,000 subscribers.

Startup Digest was acquired by Startup Weekend in October 2012, and subsequently became part of the Techstars family of companies following its acquisition of Startup Weekend in 2015.

== Description ==
Startup Digest is a weekly curated email newsletter. The newsletter contains startup and tech related events in local communities; currently, Startup Digest operates in more than 300 cities all over the world.

Startup Digest used to generate revenue from a VIP program. The company currently has 500 curators across the world.
