= Jose Enrique Miraflores =

Filipino politician

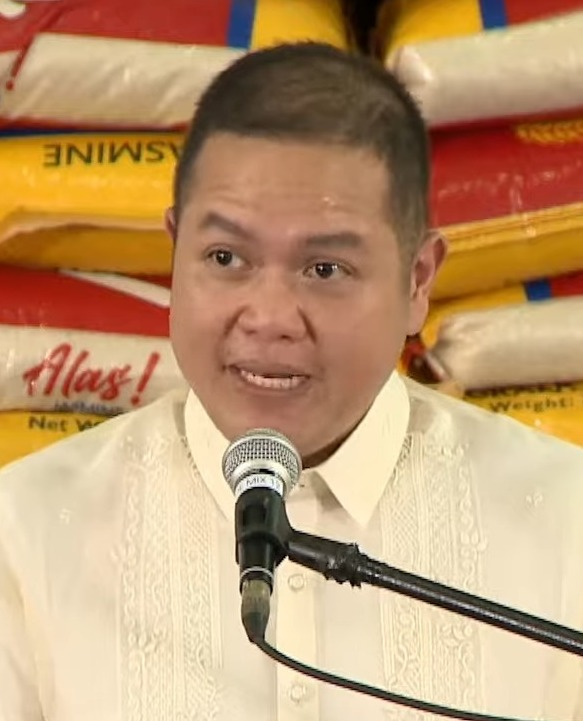

15th Governor of Aklan
- Incumbent
- Assumed office June 30, 2022
- Vice Governor: Reynaldo M. Quimpo (2022–2025); Dexter M. Calizo (2025–present)
- Preceded by: Florencio Miraflores

Personal details
- Born: June 22, 1982 (age 44) Roxas City, Capiz, Philippines
- Party: Lakas (2024–present)
- Other political affiliations: PDP–Laban (2021–2024)
- Education: University of Asia and the Pacific

Jose Enrique "Joen" Martin Miraflores is a Filipino politician and is the current governor of the province of Aklan since 2022. Prior to this, he served as mayor of Ibajay.

He is the son of the former governor, Florencio Miraflores.

== Electoral history ==
Electoral history of Jose Enrique Miraflores
Year	Office	Party	Votes received				Result
Year	Office	Party	Total	%	P.	Swing	Result
2022	Governor of Aklan	PDP–Laban	196,897	63.09%	1st	—N/a	Won
2025	Governor of Aklan	Lakas	232,694	74.87%	1st	+11.78	Won

Political offices
Preceded by Florencio Miraflores	Governor of Aklan; 2022–present	Incumbent
