= Banga, Aklan =

Municipality in Aklan, Philippines

Banga
- Municipality
- Municipality of Banga
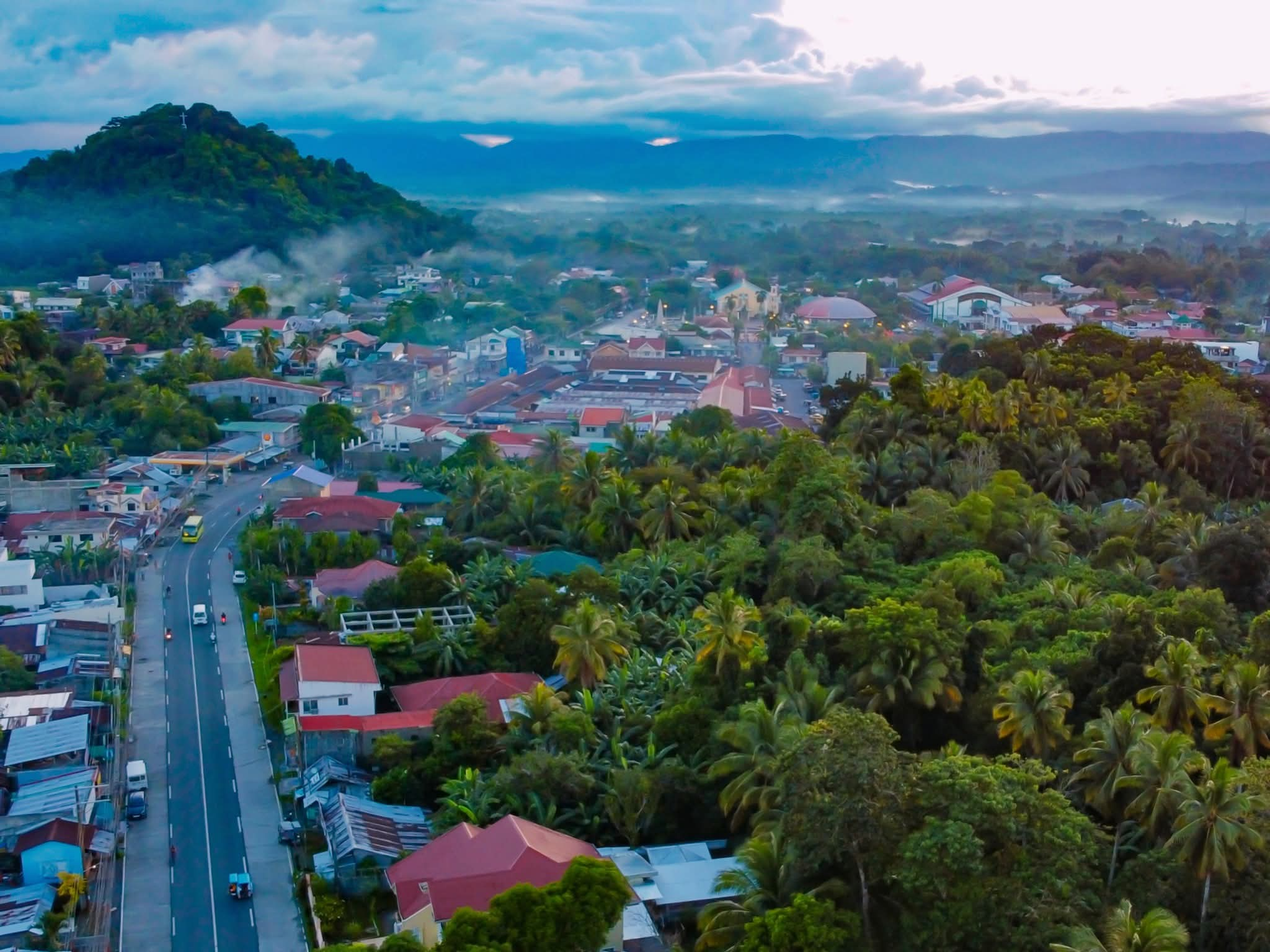

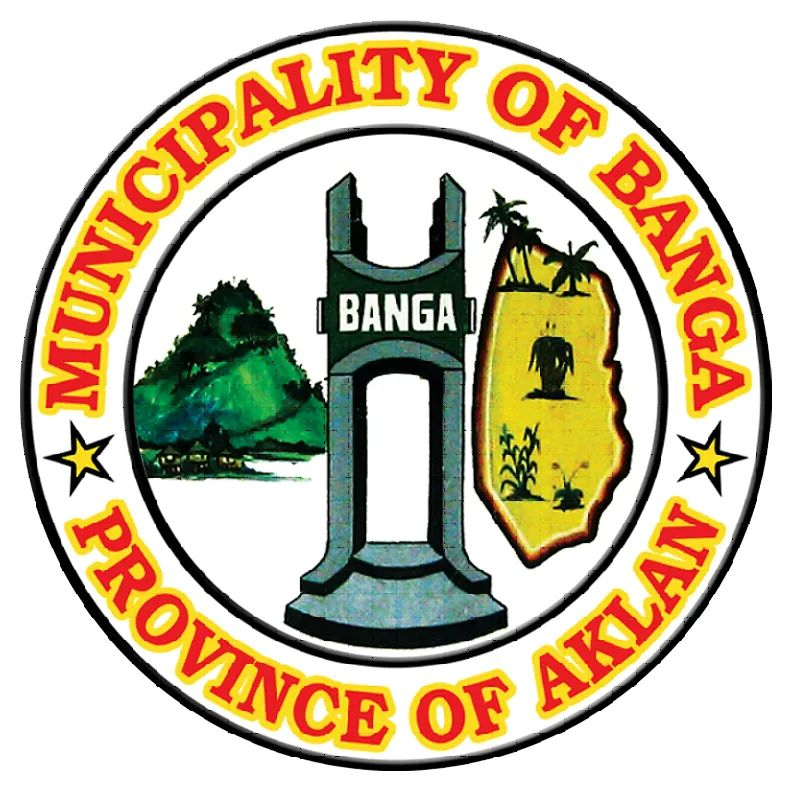
- Flag Seal
- Motto: "Magbueoligan Kita" ("We should help each other.")
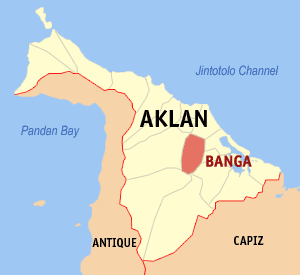
- Map of Aklan with Banga highlighted
- Interactive map of Banga
- Location within the Philippines
- Coordinates: 11°38′20″N 122°19′59″E
- Country: Philippines
- Region: Western Visayas
- Province: Aklan
- District: 1st district
- Founded: 1 January 1912
- Barangays: 30 (see Barangays)

Government
  - Type: Sangguniang Bayan
  - Mayor: Noel L. Redison
  - Vice Mayor: Stanley Macahilig
  - Representative: Jesus R. Marquez
  - Municipal Council: Members: Stanley Leigh G. Macahilig; Ronald Ray D. Imperial; Josel M. Rata; Abe R. Pastrana Jr.; Teddy C. Tupas; Larry T. Maming; Johnny M. Rentillo; Allen M. Maming
  - Electorate: 29,601 voters (2025)

Area
  - Total: 84.53 km^{2} (32.64 sq mi)
- Elevation: 48 m (157 ft)
- Highest elevation: 350 m (1,150 ft)
- Lowest elevation: 0 m (0 ft)

Population (2024 census)
  - Total: 41,188
  - Density: 487.3/km^{2} (1,262/sq mi)
  - Households: 10,055
- Demonym: Banganhon

Economy
  - Income class: 2nd municipal income class
  - Poverty incidence: 6.13% (2023)
  - Revenue: ₱ 185.2 million (2024)
  - Assets: ₱ 473.6 million (2024)
  - Expenditure: ₱ 108.7 million (2024)
  - Liabilities: ₱ 118 million (2024)

Service provider
  - Electricity: Aklan Electric Cooperative (AKELCO)
- Time zone: UTC+8 (PST)
- ZIP code: 5601
- PSGC: 060403000
- IDD : area code: +63 (0)36
- Native languages: Aklanon; Hiligaynon; Capisnon; Tagalog
- Website: bangaaklan.gov.ph

Banga, officially the Municipality of Banga (Aklanon: Banwa it Banga; Hiligaynon: Banwa sang Banga; Tagalog: Bayan ng Banga), is a municipality in the province of Aklan, Philippines. According to the 2024 census, it has a population of 41,188 people.

== History ==
The history of Banga dates back to the 15th century upon arrival in Panay Island of the ten datus from Borneo. While some skeptics considered this information a legend, still, Banganhons believed that Datu Manduyog ruled over the place with his seat of government located in Bakan, the ancient name of Banga. The site was at the foot of the Manduyog Hill that was named after Datu Manduyog. Being a legitimate successor to Datu Dangandanan who ruled what was called Akean in the late 1390s, Datu Manduyog became the ruler of Akean in 1437 and made Bakan the capital of Akean.

Another account of Banga’s history, as cited in *Panublion*, states that the town’s original site was located in what is now the Municipality of Malinao. In 1792, the town center was relocated across the Aklan River to the foot of Manduyog Hill. However, several prominent families chose to remain in the former settlement, which later became a barrio and was named Malinao, after a calm tributary of the Aklan River.

The families of Bernabe Teodosio, Diego Eulalio Teodosio, Esteban Masigon and the Muntuyas established a settlement in 1676 in what is now Sitio Opong-opong of Barrio Cupang. However, these families moved to a higher ground due to its closeness to the Aklan River that overflowed annually. In 1781 they settled in sitio Agbueakan in Barrio Tabayon.

Due to the clayish soil conditions of the sitio, they again decided to resettle in 1783 in what is now the location of Banga poblacion. They named the place Banga after the Banga palm trees that were in abundance. Because of their growing families they had to cut down most of the trees to give way to their layout plans to establish a town close to their farmlands for residential purposes. The 1818 Spanish census showed that there were 1,579 native families and 8 Spanish-Filipino families flourishing here.

American sovereignty over the country started on August 13, 1898. With the natives resisting foreign domination, a revolutionary association was organized. Hostilities between the natives and the Americans began but did not take long since the natives were ill-equipped.

A year after, Francisco Lachica was elected the first Municipal President.

The American hostilities ended upon the signing on March 29, 1901, of the "Pas de Aklan", a historical document in the Aklan Section of the Province of Capiz. The signing was done at the present municipal park at the corner of Rizal and San Jose Streets.

From January 1, 1904, to December 31, 1911, Banga was merged with Numancia and Lezo to form an "arabal" of the Municipality of Kalibo. Through the efforts of Don Baltazar Teodosio, Banga was separated from Kalibo on January 1, 1912.

On April 17, 1942, at 2:00 o’clock in the morning, the Japanese Imperial Forces landed at Culasi, Capiz. An hour later the 5th Capiz Cadre at Libas, Banga, Aklan (now Camp Jizmundo) was burned down by the United States Armed Forces in the Far East (USAFFE). Six hours later the Banga Rural High School, Banga Elementary School Building and Home Economics Building were likewise burned. About 95% of all the permanent structures in the Municipality of Banga were burned down both by the USAFFE and the Filipino guerrillas to prevent the Japanese Forces from occupying the buildings.

During the Japanese occupation, Banga was the site of a tragic and widely remembered incident. On October 21, 1942, at around 10:00 a.m., civilians were massacred at the junction of Rizal and Mabini Streets—now the Rotunda—and along the national road in front of the 5th Capiz Cadre in Libas, Banga. Many of the victims had gathered with the intention of welcoming the Japanese forces but were instead ordered to squat and were subsequently killed. Approximately 70 people died in the initial attack. This was followed by a four-day operation by Japanese troops, during which an estimated 200 more civilians were killed in an effort to suppress growing guerrilla resistance in the area.

On March 18, 1945, after the landing of the American Liberation Forces in Panay, the Philippine Civil Affairs Unit appointed Dr. Boanerjes Venturanza as the first Municipal Mayor.

== Geography ==
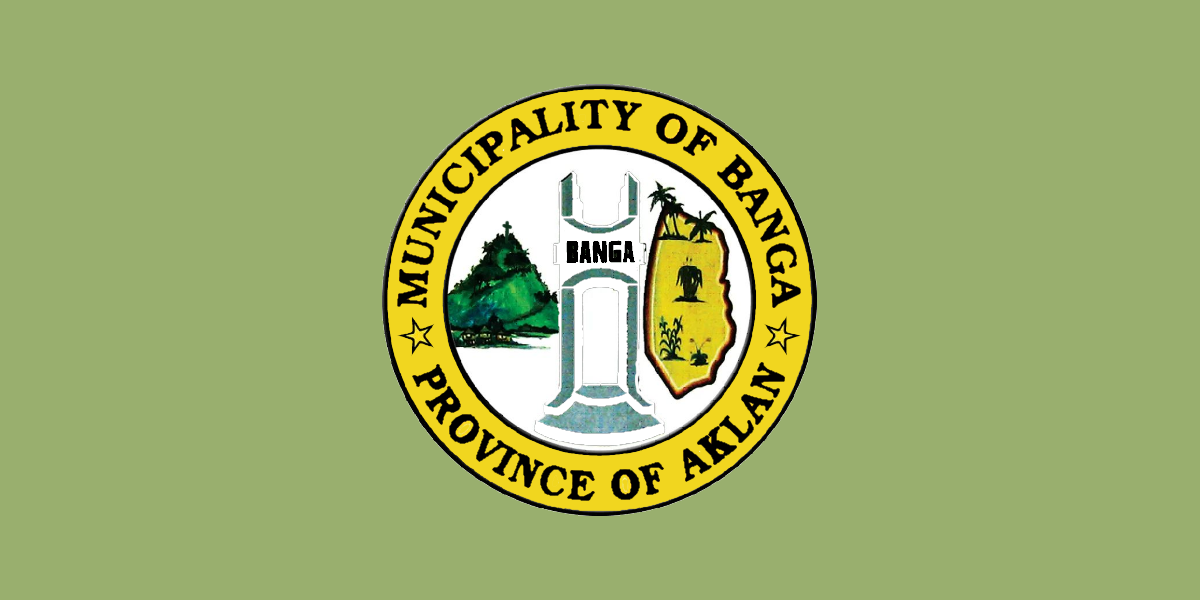
Variant flag of Banga

Banga is 9 kilometres (5.6 mi) from Kalibo, the provincial capital.

According to the Philippine Statistics Authority, the municipality has a land area of 84.53 square kilometres (32.64 sq mi) constituting 4.64% of the 1,821.42-square-kilometre- (703.25 sq mi) total area of Aklan.

=== Barangays ===
Banga is politically subdivided into 30 barangays. Each barangay consists of puroks and some have sitios.

PSGC	Barangay	Population			±% p.a.	
		2024		2010		
060403001	Agbanawan	3.7%	1,524	1,458	▴	0.31%
060403002	Bacan	4.1%	1,703	1,637	▴	0.28%
060403003	Badiangan	4.2%	1,747	1,644	▴	0.42%
060403004	Cerrudo	3.6%	1,485	1,237	▴	1.28%
060403005	Cupang	1.8%	740	736	▴	0.04%
060403006	Daguitan	1.1%	459	477	▾	−0.27%
060403007	Daja Norte	3.3%	1,340	1,563	▾	−1.07%
060403008	Daja Sur	1.2%	512	602	▾	−1.12%
060403009	Dingle	1.7%	698	723	▾	−0.24%
060403010	Jumarap	4.5%	1,835	1,744	▴	0.35%
060403011	Lapnag	1.5%	627	594	▴	0.38%
060403012	Libas	4.2%	1,717	1,662	▴	0.23%
060403013	Linabuan Sur	9.1%	3,756	3,455	▴	0.58%
060403014	Mambog	4.4%	1,803	1,596	▴	0.85%
060403015	Mangan	3.7%	1,542	1,632	▾	−0.39%
060403016	Muguing	1.9%	764	695	▴	0.66%
060403017	Pagsanghan	4.7%	1,917	1,735	▴	0.70%
060403018	Palale	1.6%	678	599	▴	0.87%
060403019	Poblacion	4.8%	1,997	2,469	▾	−1.46%
060403020	Polo	2.3%	955	1,240	▾	−1.80%
060403021	Polocate	4.1%	1,707	1,638	▴	0.29%
060403022	San Isidro	0.8%	320	305	▴	0.33%
060403023	Sibalew	2.4%	989	940	▴	0.35%
060403024	Sigcay	2.5%	1,012	974	▴	0.27%
060403025	Taba-ao	2.8%	1,164	1,196	▾	−0.19%
060403026	Tabayon	4.3%	1,777	1,454	▴	1.41%
060403027	Tinapuay	1.1%	457	381	▴	1.27%
060403028	Torralba	4.6%	1,890	1,550	▴	1.39%
060403029	Ugsod	3.8%	1,566	1,426	▴	0.65%
060403030	Venturanza	2.0%	824	701	▴	1.13%
	Total		41,188	38,063	▴	0.55%

=== Climate ===
Climate data for Banga, Aklan
Month	Jan	Feb	Mar	Apr	May	Jun	Jul	Aug	Sep	Oct	Nov	Dec	Year
Mean daily maximum °C (°F)	28 (82)	29 (84)	30 (86)	32 (90)	32 (90)	31 (88)	30 (86)	29 (84)	29 (84)	29 (84)	29 (84)	28 (82)	30 (85)
Mean daily minimum °C (°F)	23 (73)	23 (73)	23 (73)	24 (75)	25 (77)	25 (77)	25 (77)	24 (75)	24 (75)	24 (75)	24 (75)	23 (73)	24 (75)
Average precipitation mm (inches)	57 (2.2)	37 (1.5)	41 (1.6)	42 (1.7)	98 (3.9)	155 (6.1)	187 (7.4)	162 (6.4)	179 (7.0)	188 (7.4)	114 (4.5)	78 (3.1)	1,338 (52.8)
Average rainy days	12.0	7.7	9.2	10.2	19.5	24.6	26.9	25.1	25.5	25.2	18.0	13.0	216.9
Source: Meteoblue (Use with caution: this is modeled/calculated data, not measured locally.)

=== Landscape ===
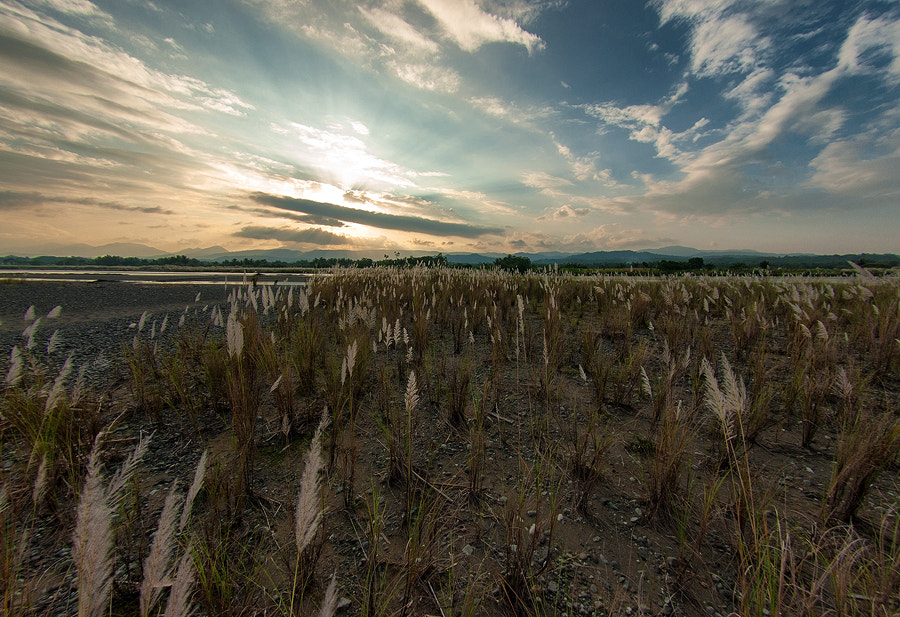

== Demographics ==
Population census of Banga
Year	Pop.	±% p.a.
1903	9,830	—
1918	11,432	+1.01%
1939	14,693	+1.20%
1948	17,977	+2.27%
1960	18,582	+0.28%
1970	21,560	+1.50%
1975	22,462	+0.83%
1980	25,034	+2.19%
1990	28,651	+1.36%
1995	30,071	+0.91%
2000	32,128	+1.43%
2007	34,276	+0.90%
2010	38,063	+3.89%
2015	39,505	+0.71%
2020	40,318	+0.43%
2024	41,188	+0.51%
Source: Philippine Statistics Authority

In the 2024 census, Banga had a population of 41,188. The population density was 490 inhabitants per square kilometre (1,300/sq mi).

=== Language ===
Aklanon is the dominant dialect of Banga while Hiligaynon is used as a secondary dialect.

== Economy ==
Poverty incidence of Banga

Source: Philippine Statistics Authority

== Government ==
=== List of local chief executives ===
The following headed the town from the American Period until the present under two different titles. On 18 March 1945, after the landing of the American Liberation Forces and Philippine Commonwealth troops in Panay, the Philippine Civil Affairs Unit appointed Dr. Boanerjes Venturanza as the first Municipal Mayor.

Municipal presidents

- 1899–uncertain — Francisco Lachica
- 1904–1911 — None (town merged with Kalibo)
- 1912–1913 — Baltazar Teodosio
- 1913–1916 — Francisco Lachica
- 1916–1919 — Jacinto Repiedad
- 1919–1925 — Edecio Venturanza
- 1925–1931 — Baltazar Teodosio
- 1931–1937 — Pedro Recto
- 1937–1943 — Lorenzo Duran
- 1943–1945 — Ereneo Icotanim

Municipal mayors

- 1945 — Dr. Boanerjes Venturanza (appointed)
- 1945–1951 — José Urquiola
- 1951–1959 — Atty. Vicente Teodosio
- 1959–1963 — Dr. Napoleon Macahilig
- 1963–1971 — Atty. Tomas Raz
- 1971–1986 — Atty. Sergio Rigodon
- 1986–1995 — José Urquiola, Jr.
- 1995–2004 — Dr. Stevens Fuentes
- 2004–2007 — Atty. Jeremy Fuentes
- 2007–2013 — Antonio Maming
- 2013–2022 — Erlinda Maming
- 2022–Present — Noel Redison

== Attractions ==
At the religious sanctuary of Manduyog Hill, an annual pilgrimage is conducted on Good Friday. Devotees practise the 14 Stations of the Cross, pray the rosary, and light candles at each stop while climbing towards the peak where a 40m cross, sometimes lighted, is visible from due north to Kalibo and the nearby sea.

== Education ==
The Banga Schools District Office governs all educational institutions within the municipality. It oversees the management and operations of all private and public, from primary to secondary schools.

=== Primary and elementary schools ===
- Agbanawan Primary School
- Bacan Elementary School
- Badiangan Elementary School
- Banga Elementary School
- Capitan Tazan Memorial Primary School
- Christ the King Kindergarten
- Daguitan Primary School
- Daja Norte Elementary School
- Daja Sur Elementary School
- Dingle Elementary School
- Lapnag Primary School
- Mangan Elementary School
- Mangga Primary School
- Muguing Elementary School
- Polo Elementary School
- Polocate Elementary School
- Saint Joseph Catholic Learning School
- San Isidro Primary School
- Sibalew Elementary School
- Sigcay Elementary School
- Tinapuay Primary School
- Torralba Elementary School
- Urquiola Elementary School
- Tabayon Primary School
- Taba-ao Primary School

=== Secondary schools ===
- Aguinaldo T. Repiedad Sr. Integrated School
- Aklan State University-Laboratory High School
- Bacan National High School
- Central Visayan Institute
- Daja Sur National High School
- Don Edecio S. Venturanza Integrated School
- Mangan National High School
- Petronilo C. Ibadlit National High school
- Torralba National High school

=== Higer educational institution ===
- Aklan State University

== See also ==
- Maragtas
- Aklan
