= Aklan's 1st congressional district =

House of Representatives of the Philippines legislative district

- Constituency for the House of Representatives of the Philippines
- Map Boundary of Aklan's 1st congressional district in Aklan
- Location of Aklan within the Philippines
- Province: Aklan
- Region: Western Visayas
- Population: 313,775 (2020)
- Electorate: 209,315 (2022)
- Major settlements: 8 LGUs: Municipalities; Altavas; Balete; Banga; Batan; Kalibo; Libacao; Madalag; New Washington

Current constituency
- Created: 2018
- Representative: Jess Marquez
- Political party: NPC
- Congressional bloc: Majority

Aklan's 1st congressional district is one of the two congressional districts of the Philippines in the province of Aklan. It has been represented in the House of Representatives of the Philippines since 2019. The district consists of the provincial capital municipality of Kalibo and adjacent municipalities of Altavas, Balete, Banga, Batan, Libacao, Madalag, and New Washington. It is currently represented in the 20th Congress by Jesus Marquez of the Nationalist People's Coalition (NPC).

== List of members representing the district ==
=== House of Representatives (1987–present) ===
No.	Portrait	Member	Term of office		Legislature	Party	Electoral history	Constituent LGUs
No.	Portrait	Member	Start	End	Legislature	Party	Electoral history	Constituent LGUs
District created August 28, 2018.
1		Carlito Marquez	June 30, 2019	June 30, 2025	18th Congress	NPC	Elected in 2019.	2019–present Altavas, Balete, Banga, Batan, Kalibo, Libacao, Madalag, New Washington
1		Carlito Marquez	June 30, 2019	June 30, 2025	19th Congress	NPC	Re-elected in 2022.	2019–present Altavas, Balete, Banga, Batan, Kalibo, Libacao, Madalag, New Washington
2		Jess Marquez	June 30, 2025	Incumbent	20th Congress	NPC	Re-elected in 2025.	2019–present Altavas, Balete, Banga, Batan, Kalibo, Libacao, Madalag, New Washington

== Election results ==
=== 2019 ===
2019 Philippine House of Representatives election in Aklan
Party	Candidate	Votes	%
NPC	Carlito Marquez	92,292	65.82
Independent	Antonio Maming	43,433	30.98
Independent	Axel Gonzalez	4,484	3.20
Total votes		140,209	100.00
NPC win (new seat)			

=== 2022 ===
2022 Philippine House of Representatives election in Aklan
Party	Candidate	Votes	%
NPC	Carlito Marquez (incumbent)	89,731	55.65
NUP	Rodell Ramos	59,110	36.66
Aksyon	Harry Sucgang	9,710	6.02
Independent	Rodson Mayor	2,863	1.78
Total votes		161,234	100.00
NPC hold			

=== 2025 ===
2025 Philippine House of Representatives election in Aklan
Party	Candidate	Votes	%
NPC	Jess Marquez	88,054	53.91
Aksyon	Rodell Ramos	75,286	46.09
Total votes		163,340	100.00
NPC hold			

== See also ==
- Legislative districts of Aklan
