= Startup Weekend (organization) =

Entrepreneurship competitive event

- Status: active
- Genre: Hackathon
- Frequency: weekend
- Years active: 2007-present
- Website: www.techstars.com/communities/startup-weekend

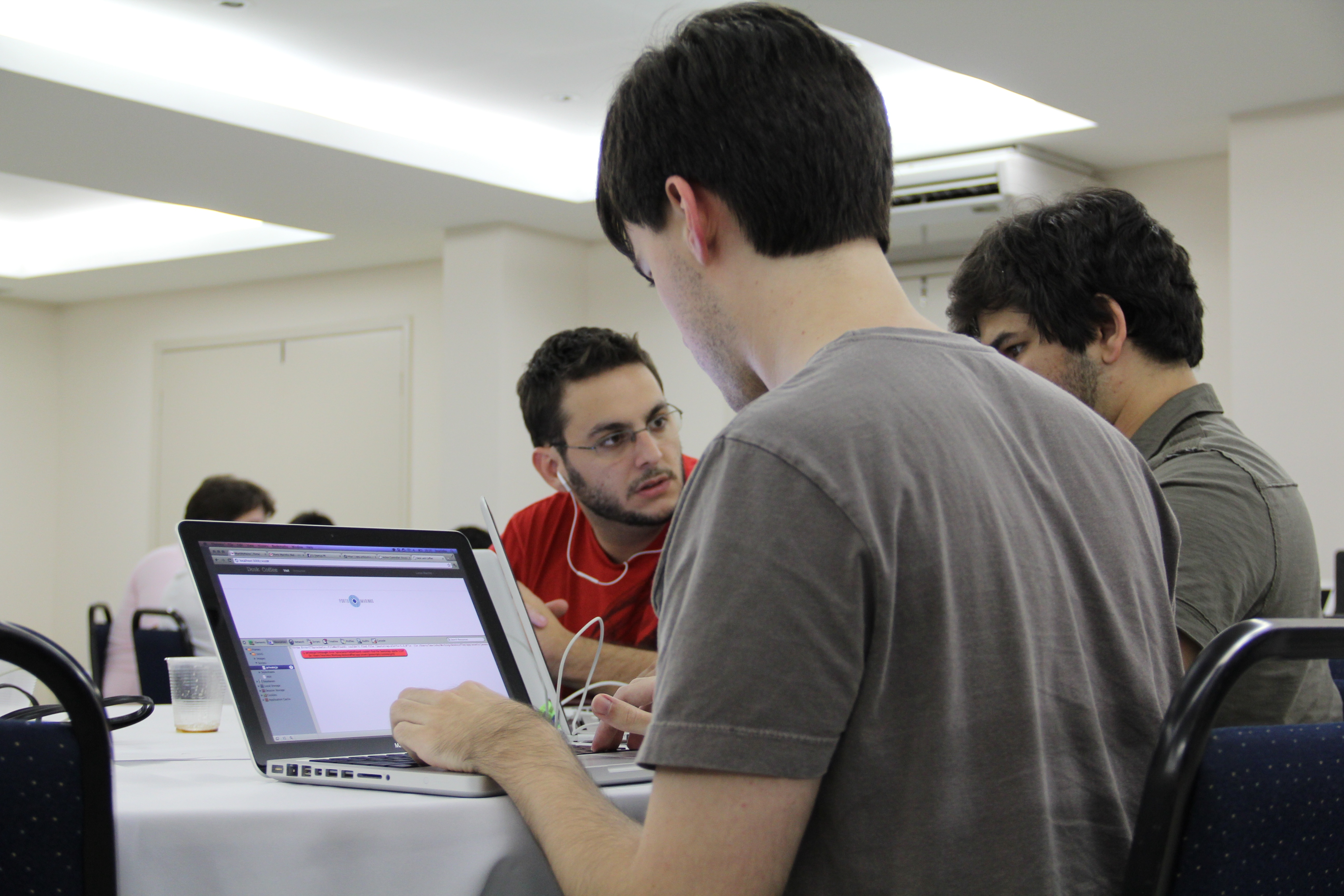
A Startup Weekend in Brazil in 2011.

A Startup Weekend (also known as Startupweekend or SW) is a 54-hour entrepreneurship educational competitive event, in which groups of participants form teams around ideas the Friday evening, and work during the weekend to develop a working prototype, demo, and VC presentation by Sunday evening. Startup Weekend is a hackathon-like event with a global presence. As of December 2016, it has reached 135 countries, involving over 210,000 entrepreneurs. Upon its 2015 acquisition, Startup Weekend, alongside Startup Week and StartupDigest, became one of the Techstars family of startup programs.

== History ==
Founded in July 2007 in Boulder, Colorado by Andrew Hyde, Startup Weekend brought together 70 entrepreneurs to try to create a startup in just 54 hours. The model quickly expanded to cities around the world.

In January 2010, Marc Nager and Clint Nelsen took over full ownership and registered the organization as a not-for-profit, relocating to Seattle. As of the acquisition, Startup Weekend had organized approximately 80 events in the USA, England, Germany and Canada. In February 2010, Franck Nouyrigat joined as a co-director and CTO. In the fall of 2010, Startup Weekend gained 501c3 status and received a grant from the Kauffman Foundation.

By December 2010, the organization was composed of 8 full-time employees, over 15 'Key Facilitators', and more than 100 local organizers. In 2011, Startup Weekend launched the StartUp Foundation Initiative in partnership with the Ewing Marion Kauffman Foundation. In June 2012, Startup Weekend opened its first regional offices in London and Mexico City. By 2016, Startup Weekend events ran in over 1000 cities around the world.

== Event model ==
Startup Weekend events span the course of a weekend (approximately 54 hours), and are generally composed of 60-120 participants (although events in the past have ranged from 13 to 300+). In addition to attendees (otherwise known as 'Weekend Warriors'), the event includes speakers, coaches, panelists (generally well-respected members of the local startup community or notable names in the tech industry), and various sponsors and company representatives. Some of teams end up working together beyond the startup weekend to build a fully operating startup and others take with them the bootcamp experience and a network of like minds.

The groups of participants composed of developers, business managers, startup enthusiasts, marketing experts, graphic artists and more pitch ideas for new startup companies, form teams around those ideas, and work to develop a working prototype, demo, or presentation by Sunday evening.

StartupWeekend can be open themed or themed around a specific vertical, such as social innovation, IoT, artificial intelligence, Fintech, woman, or retail. When a vertical is common to multiple events, global editions can be created by global organisers. Global editions create a following competition between the winners of local editions.

== Global Startup Battle ==
Startup Weekend launched the Global Startup Battle format in 2011 during Global Entrepreneurship Week. The 2012 battle included 10,000+ participants, 1,200+ teams, taking place in 100+ cities around the world. Global Startup Battle has three phases: First, the team must win the local Startup Weekend. Second, the team must win a Facebook popularity contest by receiving votes.

Only the top 15 teams move on to the final stage. The final stage is a judging panel. In 2016, Global Startup Battle, shifted to become Global Startup Weekend, a world-wide celebration of Startup Weekends.

== Startup Weekend Global 2022 ==
Startup Weekend Global (SWG) 2022, organised by StartupX, was a virtual hackathon with global outreach and centred around the 5 verticals: Web3, Metaverse, DeFi, NFT and Gaming. SWG 2022 took place over the course of 3 months and involved 1700+ participants from 120+ countries, 20 speakers, mentors and judges, and 32 community leaders.

Winners
Prize	Team	Pitch Idea
1	Entropy Labs	Unified passport of “stamps!” from your beloved brands collected at unique locations
2	Collectif Dao	Non-custodial liquid staking protocol on Filecoin network
3	Gaita	Verifiable credentials for insurance companies
Wagmi	Otto Protocol	Building the next generation of stablecoin

== See also ==
- Economic dynamism
- Techstars
- StartupDigest
