= Aklan State University =

Public university in Aklan, Philippines

- Pamantasang Pampamahalaan ng Aklan (Filipino)
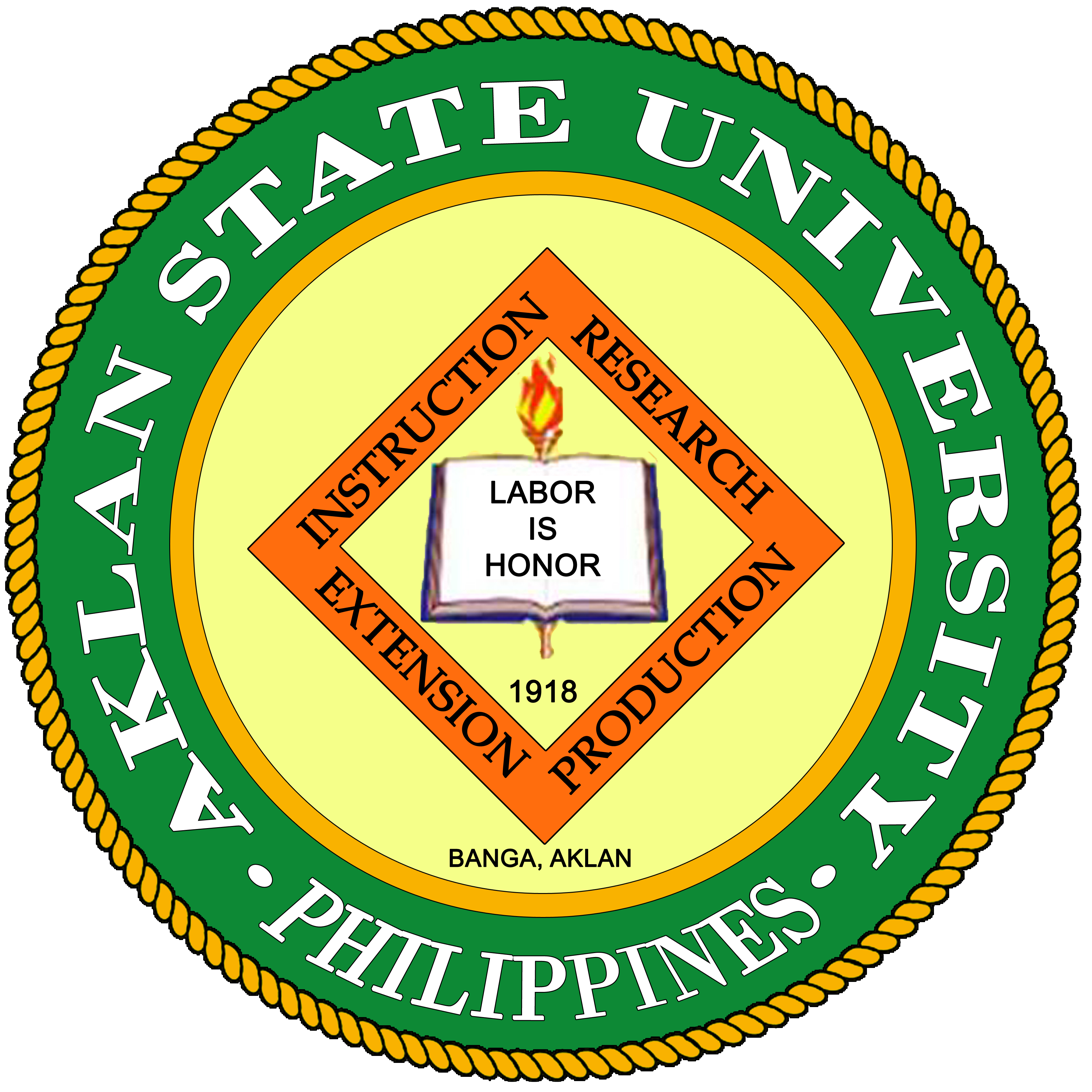
- Former names: Banga Intermediate School (1917‑1918); Capiz Farm School (1918‑1928); Banga Rural High School (1928‑1963); Aklan Agricultural College (1963‑1992); Aklan State College of Agriculture (1992-2001)
- Motto: The innovative university for sustainable futures
- Type: Public state non-profit research higher education institution
- Established: 1917; 109 years ago
- Chairman: Ricmar P. Aquino, PhD
- President: Jeffrey A. Clarin, DIT
- Vice-president: Dr. Anna Mae C. Relingo (Administration and Finance); Dr. Eleanor F. Rosales (Academic Affairs); Prof. Julie Ann A. Salido (Research, Innovation, Training, and Extension)
- Location: Banga, Aklan, Philippines; 11°37′58″N 122°19′42″E
- Campus: List; Seat of Governance: Banga, Aklan 100 hectares (1,000,000 m^{2}); Other campuses: Kalibo, Aklan Ibajay, Aklan New Washington, Aklan Makato, Aklan
- Colors: ASU Green; ASU Gold; ASU Orange; ASU Pale Yellow
- Website: asu.edu.ph
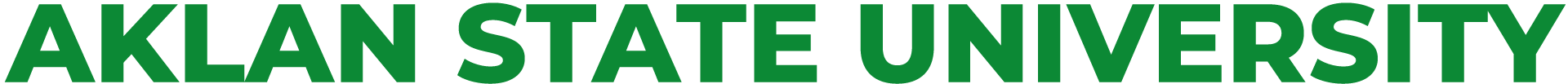

- Location in the Visayas Location in the Philippines

Aklan State University (ASU; Filipino: Pamantasang Pampamahalaan ng Aklan) is a provincial state university in Aklan province, Philippines. Its seat of governance is in ASU -Banga, with four other campuses across the province. ASU focuses on agriculture, fishery, arts and sciences, engineering and technology, and education.

Formerly known as the Aklan State College of Agriculture and the Aklan Agricultural College, the institution gained university status on April 4, 2001, with the signing of Republic Act 9055 by President Gloria Macapagal Arroyo.

== Mandate ==
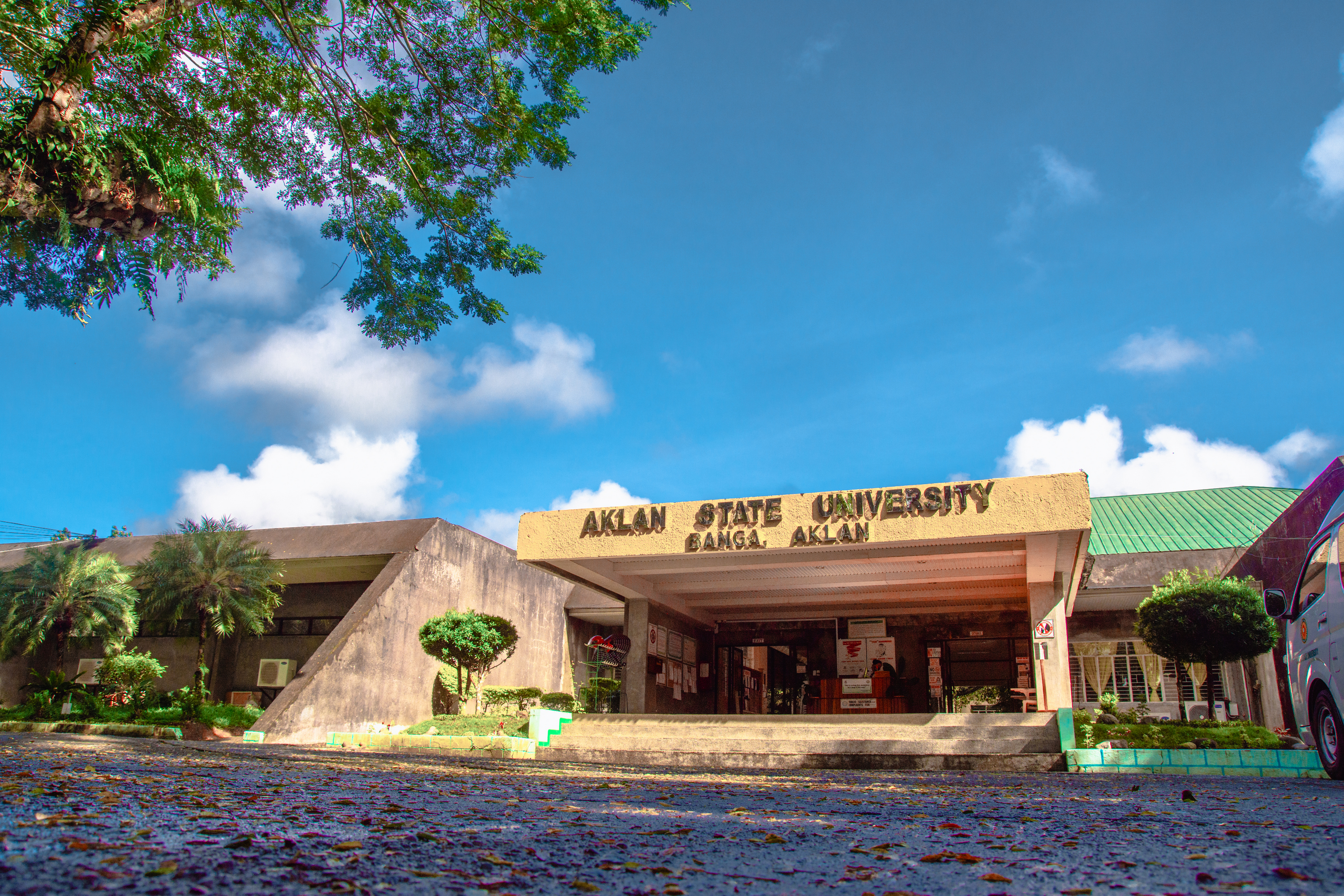
Front view of the ASU Library building, which houses the Office of the President and its attached offices, the Records Office, and the ASU - Banga Library

ASU is mandated primarily to provide advanced instruction and professional training in agriculture, science and technology, education, and other related fields, undertake research and extension services, and provide progressive leadership in these areas, provided that the university does not stray from its original mandate as a primarily agricultural institution.

As depicted in its official logo, the university has a four-pronged function: instruction, research, extension, and production.

== Campuses ==
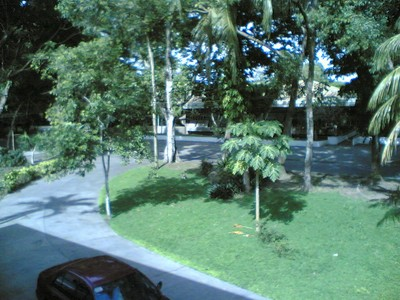
A view of ASU-Banga from the 2nd floor of the university hostel, the ASU International House

=== ASU - Banga ===
The university's biggest campus is located in Banga, occupying 100 hectares (1,000,000 m^{2}) of land below Manduyog Hill, a tourist attraction famous for its life-sized Way of the Cross.

ASU - Banga is home to the College of Agriculture, Forestry, and Environmental Science (CAFES), College of Teacher Education (CTE), College of Business and Management (CBM, formerly the School of Management Sciences or SMS), College of Arts and Sciences (formerly the School of Arts and Sciences or SAS), College of Nursing (newly created college, formerly under the SAS), and the School of Veterinary Medicine (SVM).

The campus has a swimming pool, dormitories, and a university hotel that also caters to non-ASU guests. It also houses the Regional Center for Climate Change (RCCC), the Akeanon Studies Center for Heritage, Diversity, and Educational Innovation, and the Natural Fiber Technology Resource Center (NFTRC).

Several national agencies also have their regional and provincial offices within the campus under usufruct agreements, such as the Agricultural Training Institute (ATI) - Regional Training Center VI, the Civil Service Commission - Aklan Field Office, and the Bureau of Fire Protection - Office of the Aklan Provincial Fire Marshal.

=== ASU - Kalibo ===
The campus in Kalibo, the provincial capital of Aklan, is home to the College of Industrial Technology (CIT), College of Industrial Education (CIE), College of Computer Studies (CCS), and College of Engineering and Architecture (CEA). Located in Andagao, a busy area in Kalibo, ASU-Kalibo is the smallest of the five campuses, occupying 8 hectares (20 acres), yet has the second-biggest number of students enrolled and is the highest income earner among the five ASU campuses.

Before its integration into ASCA in 1999 and eventually becoming the College of Industrial Technology of Aklan State University, it was a separate institution known as the Roxas Memorial School of Arts and Trades (RMSAT) established in 1960 by virtue of Republic Acts 1952 and 2417 authored by Cong. Hon. Godofredo P. Ramos and Cong. Jose B. Legaspi, respectively. On June 10, 1983, RMSAT became a national college by virtue of Batas Pambansa Blg. 471 authored by Assemblyman Jose T. Tumbokon. RMSAT since then became known as the Roxas Memorial College of Arts and Trades (RMCAT).

=== ASU - Ibajay ===
The campus in Ibajay is home to the College of Hospitality And Rural Resource Management, formerly known as the School of Rural Resource Development and Management. Located in Colongcolong, the campus occupies 25 hectares (62 acres) of land.

Before its integration into ASCA in 1999 and eventually becoming the College of Hospitality And Rural Resource Management of Aklan State University, it was a separate institution known as the Ibajay National Agricultural and Industrial School (INAIS), established in 1965 as a feeder school of Aklan Agricultural College by virtue of Republic Act 4486 authored by Cong. Rafael B. Legaspi. On December 16, 1994, INAIS was converted into a polytechnic college by virtue of Republic Act No. 7838 authored by Cong. Allen S. Quimpo, known as the Western Aklan Polytechnic College (WAPC).

=== ASU - New Washington ===
The campus in New Washington is home to the College of Fisheries and Marine Sciences, formerly known as the School of Fisheries and Marine Sciences, and occupies 13 hectares (32 acres) of land.

Before its integration into ASCA in 1999 and eventually becoming the College of Fisheries and Marine Sciences of Aklan State University, it was a separate institution established as New Washington Junior High School in 1948 and later New Washington High School when it progressed to complete secondary course. It was converted into Aklan National School of Fisheries in 1957 by virtue of Republic Act 1931 and into Aklan National College of Fisheries by virtue of Republic Act 3944. Both are authored by Cong. Godofredo Ramos. It is home to the Aklan Provincial Fisheries and Aquatic Resources Training, Development, and Product Center (PFARTDPC), created by virtue of Republic Act 11397.

=== ASU - Makato ===
The campus in Makato originally served as an extension high school, and was thus called the ASU Annex, before becoming known as ASU - Makato, an extension of ASU - Banga, and as such, under its administration. As of 2022, the Makato extension is home to the College of Human Development and Performance Sciences (formerly the Teacher Education Center), and occupies 10 hectares (25 acres) in Barangay Calangcang.

Before its integration into ASCA in 1999 and eventually becoming the Teacher Education Center of Aklan State University (under the umbrella of the College of Teacher Education in Banga campus), it was a separate institution known as the Northern Panay Teachers College (NPTC) established in 1966 by virtue of Republic Act 4711 authored by Cong. Rafael B. Legaspi.

== Schools and colleges ==
ASU - Banga

- College of Agriculture, Forestry, and Environmental Sciences
  - Master of Science in Agriculture
  - Bachelor of Science in Agriculture (Center of Development)
    - Crop Science
    - Animal Science
    - Agricultural Extension
    - Agricultural Economics
    - Soil Science
    - Organic Agriculture
  - Bachelor of Science in Forestry
  - Bachelor of Science in Home Technology
  - Bachelor of Science in Food Technology
- College of Teacher Education
  - Doctor of Philosophy in Educational Leadership and Management
  - Master of Arts in Education
    - English Language Teaching
    - Social Science Teaching
    - Science Teaching
    - Mathematics Teaching
    - Educational Leadership and Management
  - Bachelor of Secondary Education
    - English
    - Science
    - Mathematics
    - Social Studies
  - Bachelor of Elementary Education
- College of Business and Management
  - Master in Public Administration
  - Bachelor of Public Administration
  - Bachelor of Science in Office Administration
  - Bachelor of Science in Business Administration
    - Marketing Management
    - Financial Management (Track: Business Analytics)
    - Human Resource Management
    - Business Economics
  - Bachelor of Science in Entrepreneurship
    - Agribusiness
- College of Arts and Sciences
  - Bachelor of Arts in Communication
  - Bachelor of Arts in English Language Studies
  - Bachelor of Science in Applied Mathematics
  - Bachelor of Science in Biology
    - Ecology
    - Microbiology
- College of Nursing
  - Bachelor of Science in Nursing
- School of Veterinary Medicine
  - Doctor of Veterinary Medicine

ASU - Kalibo

- College of Industrial Technology
  - Bachelor of Science in Industrial Technology
    - Architectural Drafting Technology
    - Automotive Technology
    - Electrical Technology
    - Electronics Technology
    - Mechanical Technology
    - Civil Technology
  - Bachelor of Industrial Technology
    - Apparel and Fashion Technology
    - Beauty Care and Wellness Technology
    - Culinary Technology
- College of Industrial Education
  - Master of Arts in Education
    - Home Economics
    - Industrial Arts
  - Bachelor of Technical-Vocational Teacher Education
    - Electronics Technology
    - Electrical Technology
    - Welding Technology and Fabrication
    - Beauty Care and Wellness
    - Hotel and Restaurant Services
    - Food Service Management
    - Computer System Servicing and Programming
- College of Computer Studies
  - Bachelor of Science in Information Technology
  - Bachelor of Science in Information Systems
  - Bachelor of Science in Entertainment and Multimedia Computing
- College of Engineering and Architecture
  - Bachelor of Science in Architecture
  - Bachelor of Science in Civil Engineering
    - Structural Engineering
    - Construction Engineering and Management
- Bachelor of Science in Hospitality Management

ASU - Ibajay

- College of Hospitality and Rural Resource Management
  - Master in Tourism Management
  - Bachelor of Science in Hospitality Management
  - Bachelor of Science in Tourism Management
  - Bachelor of Elementary Education
  - Bachelor of Secondary Education (major in Filipino)
  - Bachelor of Science in Computer Science
  - Bachelor of Science in Environmental Science

ASU - New Washington

- College of Fisheries and Marine Sciences
  - Master of Arts in Education (major in Physical Education)
  - Bachelor of Science in Fisheries
  - Bachelor of Science in Marine Biology
  - Bachelor of Science in Customs Administration
  - Bachelor of Secondary Education (major in Filipino)
  - Bachelor of Culture and Arts Education
  - Bachelor of Science in Criminology
  - Bachelor of Science in Hospitality Management

ASU - Makato

- College of Human Development and Performance Sciences
  - Bachelor of Physical Education
  - Bachelor of Science in Exercise and Sports Science (major in Fitness and Sports Management)
  - Bachelor of Technology and Livelihood Education (major in Home Economics)
  - Bachelor in Early Childhood Education

== Governance and administrative structure ==
The key stakeholders of ASU make up its Board of Regents, chaired by the Chairman of the Commission of Higher Education and vice-chaired by the University President. The members of the Board include the Chairman of the House Committee on Higher and Technical Education, the Chairman of the Senate Committee on Higher, Technical, and Vocational Education, Regional Executive Director of the Department of Agriculture Regional Field Office VI (DA-RFO6), Regional Directors of the Department of Economy, Planning, and Development Regional Office VI (DEPDev-RO6, formerly the NEDA) and Department of Science and Technology Regional Office VI (DOST-RO6), two representatives from the private sector, and the presidents of the Federated Associations of the Alumni, Faculty, and Student Councils.

Key Officials

Name	Position
Dr. Jeffrey A. Clarin	President
Dr. Anna Mae C. Relingo	Vice-president for Administration and Finance
Dr. Eleanor F. Rosales	Vice-president for Academic Affairs
Prof. Julie Ann Salido	Vice-president for Research, Innovation, Training, and Extension
Mr. Edilberto L. Solidum	Chief Administrative Officer, Administrative Division
Dr. Remedios M. Marabe	Chief Administrative Officer, Finance Division
Dr. Angeline G. Regalado	Campus Director, ASU - Kalibo
Prof. Jerby J. Paderes	Campus Director, ASU - Ibajay
Prof. Francis I. Renacido	Campus Director, ASU - New Washington
Dr. Amelia T. Navejas	Campus Director, ASU - Makato
