= Carlito Marquez =

Filipino politician

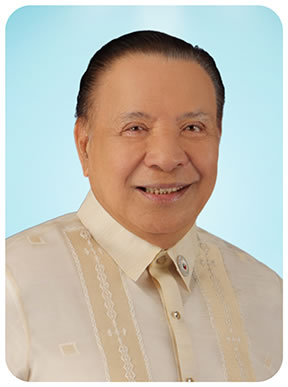
- Official portrait, 2022

Member of the Philippine House of Representatives from Aklan's 1st District
- In office June 30, 2019 – June 30, 2025
- Preceded by: Post created
- Succeeded by: Jess Marquez
- In office June 30, 2016 – June 30, 2019
- Preceded by: Teodorico Haresco Jr.
- Succeeded by: District dissolved
- Constituency: Lone District

14th Governor of Aklan
- In office June 30, 2004 – June 30, 2013
- Vice Governor: Ronquillo Tolentino (2004–2007); Gabrielle Calizo-Quimpo (2007–2013)
- Preceded by: Florencio Miraflores
- Succeeded by: Florencio Miraflores

Personal details
- Born: July 21, 1942 (age 84) Numancia, Capiz, Commonwealth of the Philippines
- Citizenship: Philippines
- Party: NPC (2015-present)
- Other political affiliations: Lakas-CMD (2004-2015)
- Education: Laguinbanua Elementary School, Aklan College of Kalibo
- Alma mater: Mapua Institute of Technology
- Occupation: Politician
- Nickname: Lito

Carlito Marquez (born July 21, 1942) is a Filipino politician. He last served as a member of the Philippine House of Representatives representing the 1st District of Aklan from 2016 to 2025. He previously served as Governor of Aklan from 2004 to 2013.

== Political career ==
In 2016, Marquez was elected as Representative of the Lone District of Aklan. During his term as Legislator, one local law was passed entitled Republic Act 11077; An Act Reapportioning the Province of Aklan into Two Legislative District. Lito was the incumbent representative of Aklan from First District. Year 2013, during his last term as the Governor of Aklan, he decided to run as the Kasangga Party-list as first nominee in 2013 Election. In 2016, he is the biggest election spenders in Aklan. He led the unveiling of the two buildings of Agricultural Training Institute in Region 6 along with Dr. Glenn B. Gregorio, Executive Director of Southeast Asian Regional Center for Graduate Study and Research in Agriculture (SEARCA); Dr. Danilo E. Abayon, former University President of ASU; Dr. Arlene Flores, ATI Managers (ATIMA) President; Dr. Eden DLR. Bautista, Center Director of ATI Region 6; former Center Directors and Employees of the said center; Learning Site (LS) Cooperators; ASU Officials; and 4-H Club Regional Officers. In his message, Hon. Marquez expressed the contribution of agriculture sector in achieving progress in the province.

House of Representatives of the Philippines
Preceded by Position created	Representative, 1st District of Aklan; June 30, 2019	Succeeded by Position Created
House of Representatives of the Philippines
Preceded by Teodorico T. Haresco Jr.	Representative, Lone District of Aklan; 2016–2019	Succeeded by Split into two legislative districts
Political offices
Preceded by Florencio T. Miraflores	Governor of the Province of Aklan; 2004–2013	Succeeded by Florencio T. Miraflores
