= Madja-as =

Mythical pre-Hispanic state in the Philippines

- after the 11th century
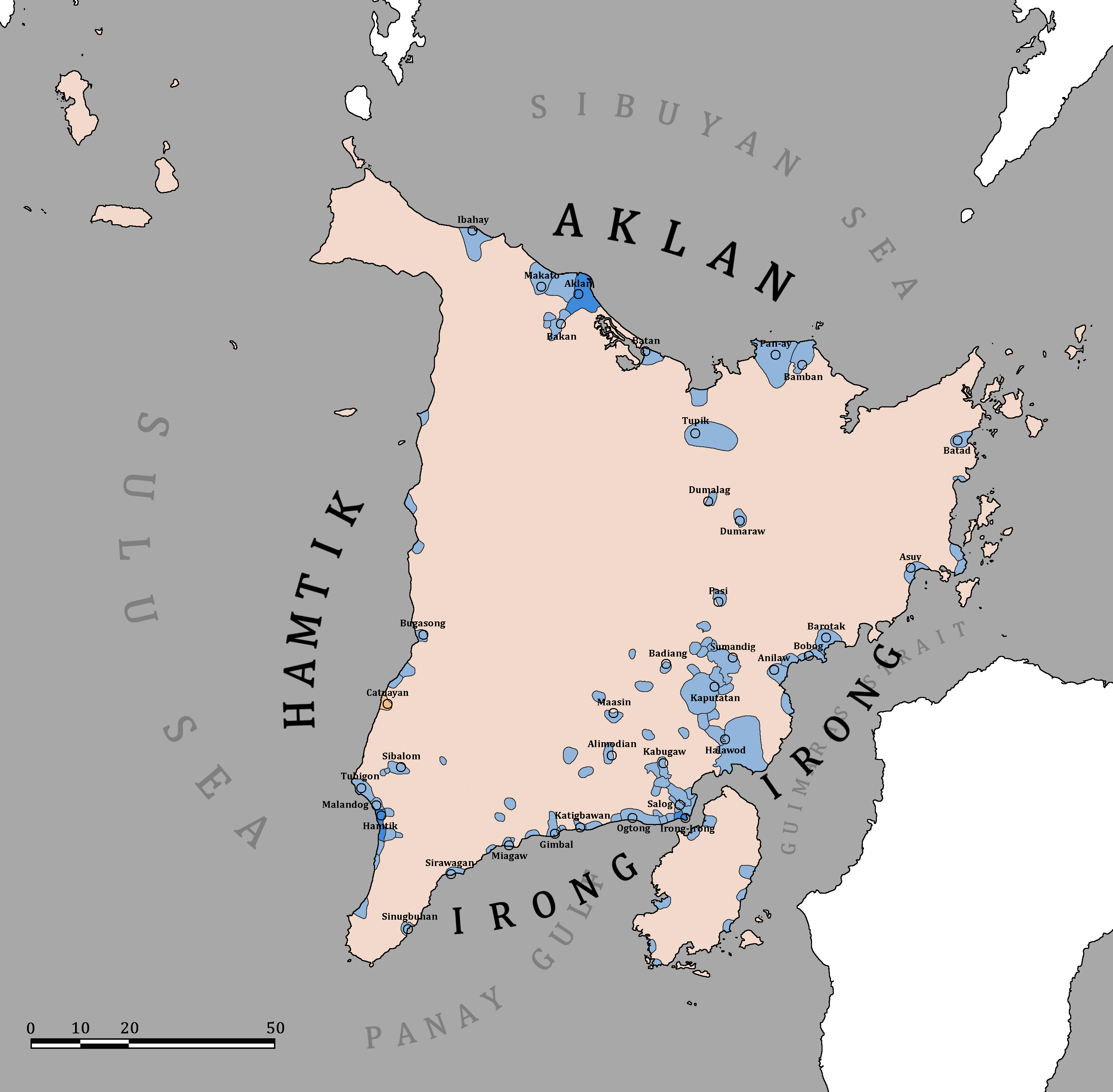
- A map of Madja-as according to the Maragtas by Pedro Monteclaro (1907).
- Capital: Malandog; Aklan; Irong-Irong
- Common languages: Bisayan languages, Old Malay, Sanskrit
- Religion: Majority; Folk religion Minority; Hinduism; Buddhism
- Government: Federal monarchy
- Datu
  - c. after the 11th century: Datu Sumakwel
- History
  - Established by 10 Datus: after the 11th century
- Currency: Gold, Pearls, Barter
Succeeded by
Captaincy General of the Philippines; Iloilo
- Today part of: Philippines

Madja-as was a legendary precolonial confederacy on the island of Panay in the Philippines. It was mentioned in Pedro Monteclaro's book titled Maragtas. It was supposedly created by Datu Sumakwel to exercise his authority over all the other datus of Panay. Like the Maragtas and the Code of Kalantiaw, the historical authenticity of the confederation is disputed.

== The Maragtas legend ==
=== Background ===
==== The book of Maragtas ====
The Maragtas is a work by Pedro Alcantara Monteclaro titled (in English translation) History of Panay from the first inhabitants and the Bornean immigrants, from which they descended, to the arrival of the Spaniards. The work is in mixed Hiligaynon and Kinaray-a languages in Iloilo written in 1901 and published in 1907. It is an original work based on written and oral sources available to the author.

While the work is disputed, the notion that the Maragtas is an original work of fiction by Monteclaro is disputed by a 2019 Thesis, named "Mga Maragtas ng Panay: Comparative Analysis of Documents about the Bornean Settlement Tradition" by Talaguit Christian Jeo N. of the De La Salle University who stated that, "Contrary to popular belief, the Monteclaro Maragtas is not a primary source of the legend but is rather more accurately a secondary source at best" as the story of the Maragtas also appeared in the Augustinian Friar, Rev. Fr. Tomas Santaren’s Bisayan Accounts of Early Bornean Settlements (created in 1858, published in 1902) (Note: This work was originally a part of the appendice in the book, Igorrotes: estudio geográfico y etnográfico sobre algunos distritos del norte de Luzon (Igorots: a geographic and ethnographic study of certain districts of northern Luzon by Fr. Angel Perez.))

An old manuscript 'Margitas' of uncertain date (discovered by the anthropologist H. Otley Beyer) was said to have given interesting details about the laws, government, social customs, and religious beliefs of the early Visayans. However, F. Landa Jocano made it clear that the book in question was the Maragtas, not the Margitas.

==== Connection with Srivijaya ====
Historian Robert Nicholl implied that the Srivijayans of Sumatra, Vijayans of Vijayapura at Brunei and the Visayans in the Philippines were all related and connected to each other since they form one contiguous area. On a similar note, according to an early Spanish missionary and historian P. Francisco Colin, S.J. in the Philippines, the inhabitants of Panay Island were originally from north Sumatra.

=== Rebellion against Makatunaw ===
According to the Maragtas, Datu Makatunaw is the ruler of Borneo and a relative of Datu Puti who seized the properties and riches of the ten datus. According to Augustinian Friar Rev. Fr. Santaren's version of Maragtas (1858) Datu Macatunao (Note: Datu Macatunao is a Hispanicized orthography of Datu Makatunaw. Makatunaw is also alternatively spelled Makatunao.) is labelled as the “sultan of the Moros”.

Datu Puti, one of the leaders of the group, then led some dissident datus from Borneo in rebellion against Rajah Makatunaw. According to local oral legends and this book, ten datus of Borneo (Sumakwel, Bangkaya, Paiburong, Paduhinog, Dumangsol, Dumangsil, Dumaluglog, Balensuela, and Lubay, who were led by Datu Puti) and their followers fled to the sea on their barangays and sailed north to flee from the oppressive reign of their paramount ruler Datu Makatunaw. They fled from Borneo towards Paragua, before reaching the island of Panay.

The Code of Maragtas, a separate work from the Maragtas book, placed the date of the rebellion and the settlement at 1212, but this was doubted by historians Paul Morrow and William Henry Scott. (Note: The original Maragtas by Pedro Monteclaro did not include any specific dates for the establishment of Madja-as. The Code of Maragtas stated was a separate work by Guillermo Santiago-Cuino, which placed the date of Madja-as' creation as 1212. The Code of Maragtas has been doubted by historians such as Paul Morrow (see 'The Maragtas Legend') and William Henry Scott.)

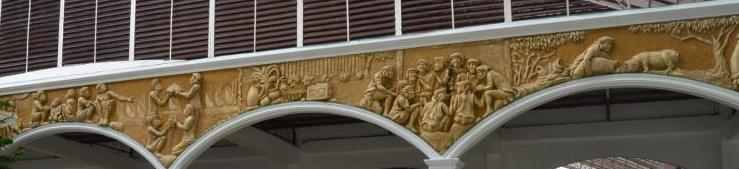
Bas relief of the Barter of Panay at the facade of the municipal gymnasium of the town of San Joaquin, Iloilo (Panay), Philippines - the town to where the place of landing of the ten Bornean Datus now belongs.

==== Name and existence of Makatunaw ====
According to British historian Robert Nicholls, Rajah Tugao, the leader of the Malano Kingdom of Sarawak according to oral tradition, was the Rajah Makatunaw referred to in the Maragtas.

J. Carrol in his article: "The Word Bisaya in the Philippines and Borneo" (1960) thinks there might be indirect evidence in the possible affinity between the Visayans and Melanaos as he speculates that Makatunaw is similar with the ancient leader of the Melanao in Sarawak, called "Tugau" or "Maha Tungao" (Maha or महत्, meaning 'great' in Sanskrit).

The existence of Datu or Rajah Makatunaw have corroboration in Chinese records during the Song Dynasty when Chinese scholars recorded that the ruler of Brunei during a February 1082 AD diplomatic meeting, was Seri Maharaja, and his descendant was Rajah Makatunaw and was together with Sang Aji (grandfather to Sultan Muhammad Shah).

=== Landing on Panay and contact with Marikudo ===
In both versions of the Maragtas, the ten datus first landed at the mouth of the river Siwaragan (Note: Siwaragan River is also spelled as Sinaragan, especially in Fr. Santaren's version of Maragtas.) in San Joaquin. What happened afterwards have conflicting narratives regarding the series of events.

According to Fr. Santaren's Maragtas (1858), the migrants from Borneo immediately came in contact with the native people of the Island, who were called Atis or Agtas. There they encountered with the Ati chief Marikudo, (Note: In earlier orthography, Marikudo was spelled as Marecudo.) who according to Monteclaro's Maragtas (1907), succeeded his father Polpulan, who was already too old to rule. The ten datus and Marikudo proceeded towards the Jalaur River, (Note: Jalaur in Fr. Santaren's Maragtas is spelled as Jalauor.) in a place called Dagame. Meanwhile, Monteclaro's Maragtas (1907) state that the ten datus and the Ati chief Marikudo and his wife Maniwantiwan (Note: Marikudo's wife Maniwantiwan was not mentioned in Fr. Santaren's version of Maragtas.) only met at Sinugbohan, also located within San Joaquin and negotiated in the same area, never heading towards the Jalaur River.

The Atis referred to the Borneans as mga Bisaya, which some historians would interpret as the Atis' way of distinguishing themselves from the white settlers.

Some writers have interpreted the Atis as Negritos. Other sources present evidence that they were not at all the original people of Negrito type, but were rather tall, dark-skinned Austronesian type. These native Atis lived in villages of fairly well-constructed houses. They possessed drums and other musical instruments, as well as a variety of weapons and personal adornments, which were much superior to those known among the Negritos.

=== Neighboring historical polities ===
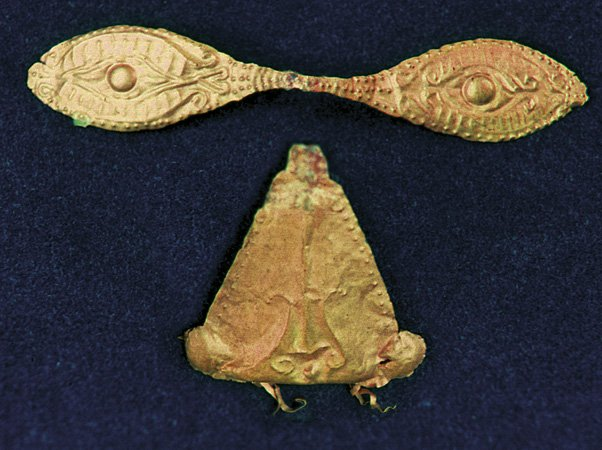
A gold mask found in Oton, showing how the City-State of Oton and the broader Kedatuan of Madja-as was already a rich trading polity.

According to Spanish and Chinese records; Madja-as had neighboring polities in Panay Island that predated the formation of the Kedatuan of Madja-as, chief among which were Oton and Dumangas. Oton, was mentioned in records from the Yuan Dynasty in the 1300s, as an independent city-state, referred to as, in Hokkien Chinese: 啞陳; Pe̍h-ōe-jī: A-tân, while according to Spanish Friar Gaspar de San Agustín, O.S.A., "...in the ancient times, there was a trading center and a court of the most illustrious nobility in the whole island." at Jalaur/Jalaud river in the vicinity of nearby Dumangas. The relations of these Chinese and Spanish mentioned polities, in connection with the Kedatuan of Madja-as, which is also corroborated by Chinese and Spanish records, remains to be determined.

=== Purchase of land by the ten datus ===
Negotiations were conducted between the ten datus and the native Atis for the possession of a wide area of land along the coast, centering on the place called Andona, at a considerable distance from the original landing place. Some of the gifts of the Visayans in exchange of those lands are spoken of as being, first, a string of gold beads so long that it touched the ground when worn and, second, a salakot, or native hat covered with gold. A golden salakot and long pearl necklace (called Manangyad in Kinaray-a, from the Kiniray-a term sangyad, which means "touching the ground when worn") was given in exchange for the plains of Panay. There were also a variety of many beads, combs, as well as pieces of cloth for the women and fancifully decorated weapons for the men. The sale was celebrated by a feast of friendship between the newcomers and the natives, following which the latter formally turned over possession of the settlement. Afterwards a great religious ceremony and sacrifice was performed in honor of the settlers' ancient gods, by the priest whom they had brought with them from Borneo. The Atis relocated to the mountains, while the newcomers occupied the coasts. In a related note, the Christian Catholic and miraculous image of Our Lady of Candles of Jaro has partial origins from the precolonial Kedatuan of Madja-as since the Virgin-Mary's Christ-Child wears a gold amulet of an elephant, a creature sacred to Hinduism and Buddhism; some of the religions adhered to by precolonial Filipinos, of which Filipino Catholic syncretism still maintains the memory of a pre-Catholic past.

Following the religious ceremony, the priest indicated that 'it was the will of the gods that they should settle not at Andona, but rather at a place some distance to the east called Malandog' (now a barangay in Hamtik, Province of Antique), where there was both much fertile agricultural land and an abundant supply of fish in the sea.

=== Organization of the settlements ===
After the establishment of the settlement in Sinugbohan, Datu Sumakwel invoked a council of datus to plan for common defense and a system of government. Six articles were adopted and promulgated, which came to be known in the academic community as Maragtas Code. They created the three districts (sacop/sakup), and they defined the system of government, plus establishing rights of individuals while providing for a justice system.

After nine days, the entire group of newcomers Datu Sumakwel were transferred to Malandog. In Aklan, Datu Bangkaya then established a settlement at a place called Madyanos, while Datu Paiburong established his village at Irong-irong (Which is now the city of Iloilo). Datu Puti left the others for the north after ensuring his people's safety. He designated Datu Sumakwel, being the eldest, wisest and most educated of the datus, as the commander-in-chief of Panay before he left.

=== Emigration of other datus ===
Not all the datus, however, remained in Panay. Two of them, with their families and followers, set out with Datu Puti and voyaged northward. After a number of adventures, they arrived at the bay of Taal, which was also called Lake Bonbon on Luzon. Datu Puti returned to Borneo by way of Mindoro and Palawan, while the rest settled in Lake Taal. According to Monteclaro, the settlers in Taal were the ancestors of the Tagalog people. However this is disputed, and in contrast to linguistic studies such as works of David Zorc, who suggested that the Tagalog people may have originated from Eastern Visayas or Northeastern Mindanao rather than Panay.

The descendants of the datus who settled by Lake Taal spread out in two general directions: one group settling later around Laguna de Bay, and another group pushing southward into the Bicol Peninsula. A discovery of an ancient tomb preserved among the Bicolanos refers to some of the same gods and personages mentioned in a Panay manuscript examined by anthropologists during the 1920s. Other datus settled in Negros Island and other Visayan islands.

The original Panay settlements continued to grow and later split up into three groups: one of which remained in the original district (Irong-irong), while another settled at the mouth of Aklan River in northern Panay. The third group moved to the district called Hantik. These settlements continued to exist down to the time of the Spanish regime and formed centers, around which the later population of the three provinces of Iloilo, Capiz, and Antique grew up.

=== Reconquest and sacking of the original invaded homeland ===
The Bornean warriors Labaodungon and Paybare, after learning of injustice committed against the Datus and their people, from their father-in-law Paiburong, sailed to Odtojan in Borneo where Sultan or Rajah Makatunaw ruled. Using local soldiers recruited from the Philippines as well as fellow pioneers from Madja-as, the warriors sacked the city, killed Makatunaw and his family, retrieved the stolen properties of the 10 datus, enslaved the remaining population of Odtojan, and sailed back to Panay. Labaw Donggon and his wife, Ojaytanayon, later settled in a place called Moroboro. Afterwards there are descriptions of various towns founded by the datus in Panay and southern Luzon.

== Social structure ==
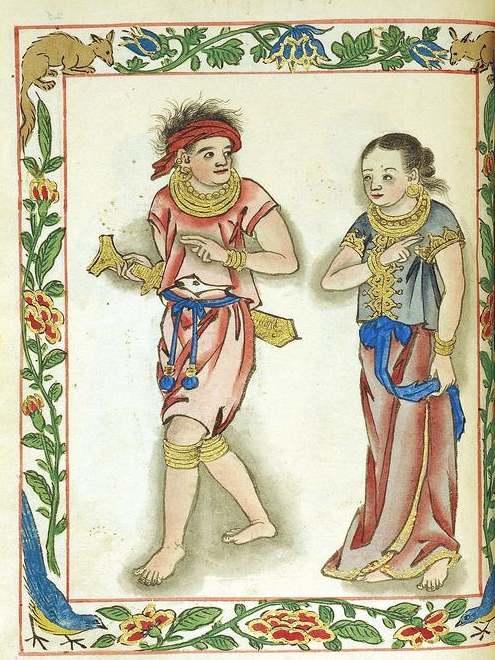
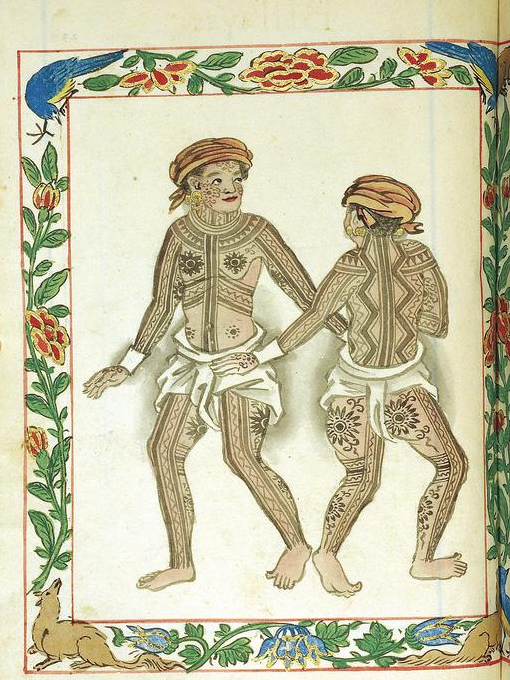
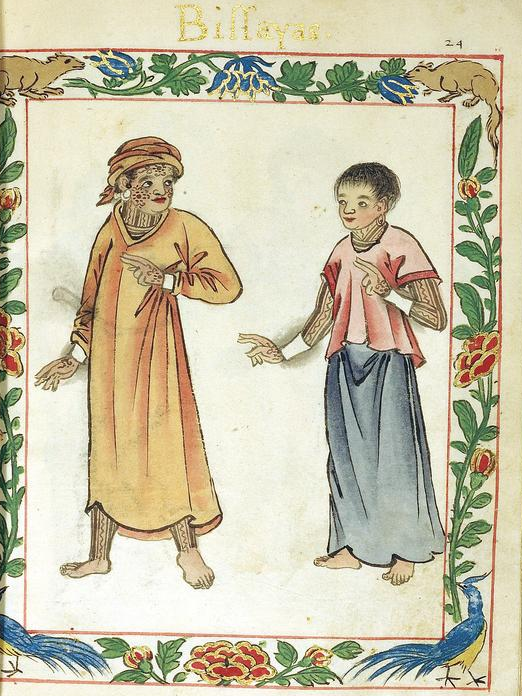
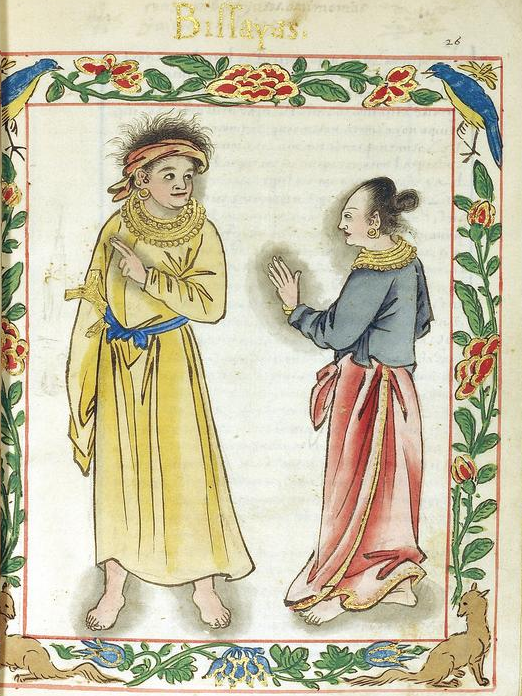
Clockwise: [1] Images from the Boxer Codex illustrating an ancient kadatuan or tumao (noble class) Visayan couple, [2] Visayan tattoos (batok), [3] a royal Visayan couple, and [4] possibly a tumao (noble class) or timawa (warrior class) couple

The datu class was at the top of a divinely sanctioned and stable social order in a Sakop or Kinadatuan (Kadatuan in ancient Malay; Kedaton in Javanese; and Kedatuan in many parts of modern Southeast Asia), which is elsewhere commonly referred to also as barangay. This social order was divided into three classes. The Kadatuan (members of the Visayan datu class) were compared by the Boxer Codex to the titled Lords (Señores de titulo) in Spain. As Agalon or Amo (lords), the datus enjoyed an ascribed right to respect, obedience, and support from their Ulipon (commoner) or followers belonging to the Third Order. These datus had acquired rights to the same advantages from their legal "Timawa" or vassals (Second Order), who bind themselves to the datu as his seafaring warriors. Timawas paid no tribute and rendered no agricultural labor. They had a portion of the datu's blood in their veins. The Boxer Codex calls these Timawas: Knights and Hidalgos. The Spanish conquistador, Miguel de Loarca, described them as "free men, neither chiefs nor slaves". In the late 17th century, the Spanish Jesuit priest Fr. Francisco Ignatio Alcina, classified them as the third rank of nobility (nobleza).

To maintain purity of bloodline, datus marry only among their kind, often seeking high-ranking brides in other barangays, abducting them, or contracting brideprices in gold, slaves and jewelry. Meanwhile, the datus keep their marriageable daughters secluded for protection and prestige. These well-guarded and protected highborn women were called Binukot, the datus of pure descent (four generations) were called "Potli nga Datu" or "Lubus nga Datu", while a woman of noble lineage (especially the elderly) are addressed by the inhabitants of Panay as "Uray" (meaning: pure as gold), e.g., Uray Hilway.

=== Lifestyle ===
The early Bornean settlers in Panay were not only seafaring, but they were also a river-based people. They were very keen in exploring their rivers. In fact, this was one of the few sports they loved so much. The Island's oldest and longest epic Hinilawod recounts legends of its heroes' adventures and travels along the Halaud River.

== Ten rulers of Madja-as ==
Datus	Capital	Dayang (Consort)	Children
Datu Puti	Sinugbohan, San Joaquin	Pinangpangan	
Datu Sumakwel	Malandog, Hamtic	Kapinangan/Alayon	1.Omodam 2.Baslan 3.Owada 4.Tegunuko
Datu Bangkaya	Aklan	Katorong	Balinganga
Datu Paiburong	Irong-Irong (Iloilo)	Pabulangan	1.Ilohay Tanayon: 2. Ilehay Solangaon
Datu Lubay	Malandog, Hamtic	None	
Datu Padohinog	Malandog, Hamtic	Ribongsapay	
Datu Dumangsil	Katalan River, Taal	None	
Datu Dumangsol	Malandog, Hamtic	None	
Datu Balensuela	Katalan River, Taal	None	
Datu Dumalogdog	Malandog, Hamtic	None	

== See also ==
- Hinduism in the Philippines
- History of the Philippines (Before 1521)

== Sources ==
- Scott, William Henry (1984), Prehispanic Source Materials for the study of Philippine History, New Day Publishers, ISBN 971-10-0226-4
