= Ati-Atihan =

Annual festival in Aklan, Philippines

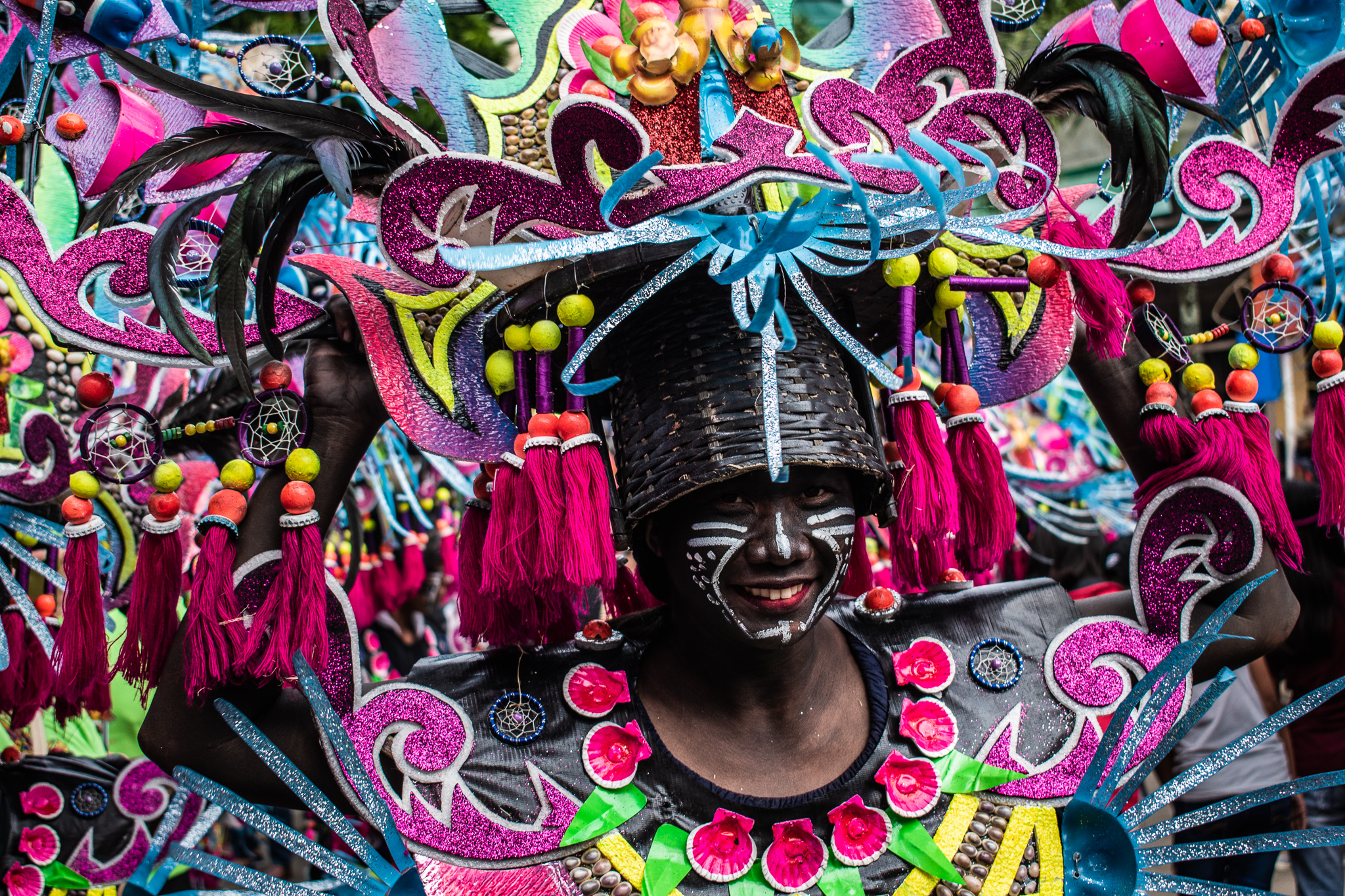
- An Ati-Atihan participant
- Official name: Kalibo Santo Niño—Ati-Atihan Festival
- Also called: Ati-Atihan
- Observed by: Kalibo, Aklan
- Liturgical color: White and Gold
- Type: Religious / Cultural
- Significance: In honor of the Holy Child, the traditions and history of the Ati people, and the 'Barter of Panay'
- Celebrations: Parades, street dancing, pilgrimage processions, solemn masses, parties
- Date: Third Sunday in January
- 2025 date: January 19
- 2026 date: January 18
- 2027 date: January 17
- 2028 date: January 16
- Frequency: Annual
- First time: 1212; 814 years ago
- Related to: Feast of Santo Niño, Sinulog, Dinagyang, Maragtas

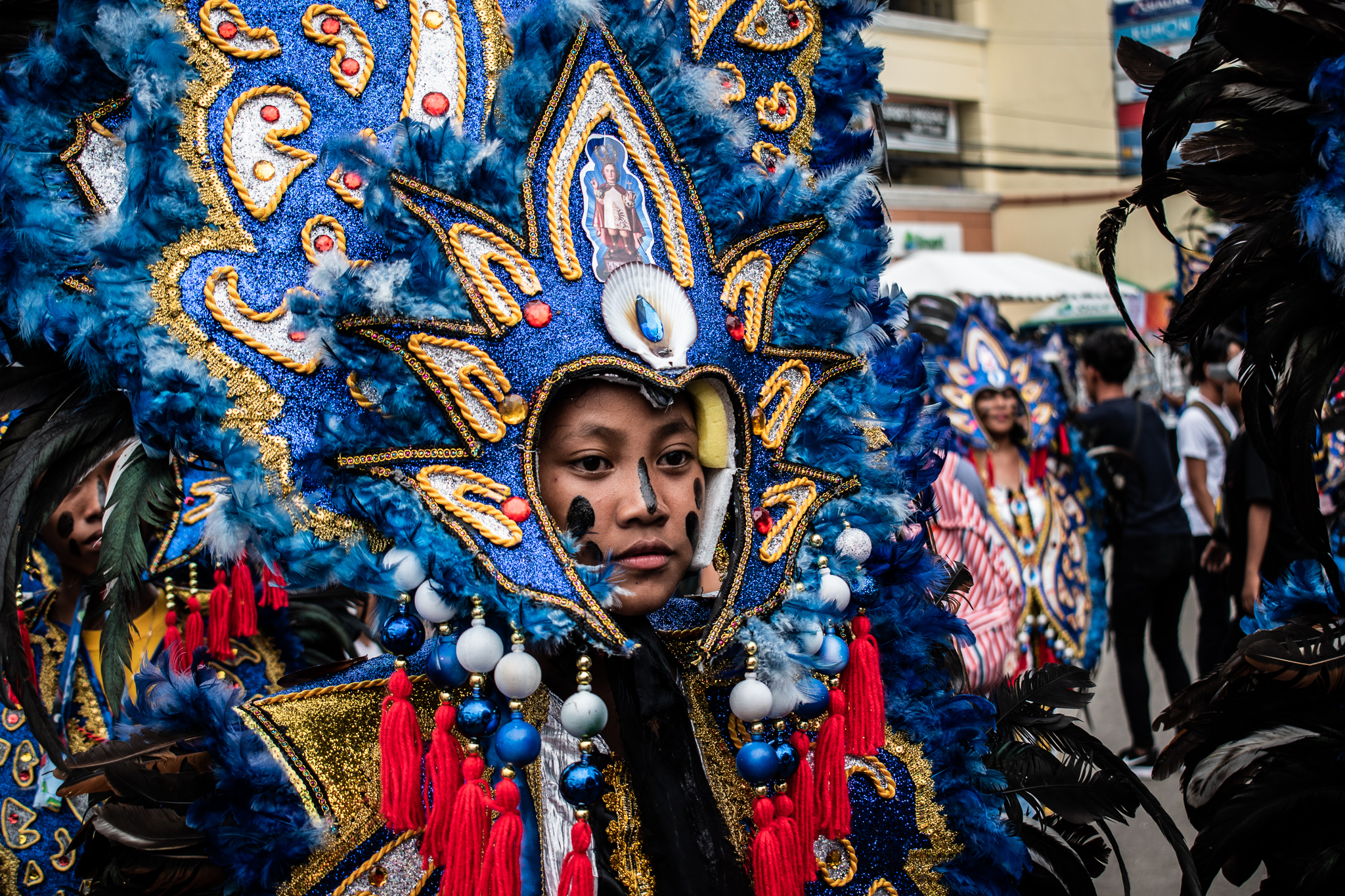
Kalibo Ati-Atihan Festival in the Philippines

The Kalibo Santo Niño–Ati-Atihan Festival, also simply called Ati-Atihan Festival, is a Philippine festival held annually in January in honor of the Santo Niño (Holy Child or Infant Jesus) in several towns of the province of Aklan, Panay Island. The biggest celebration is held during the third Sunday of January in the town of Kalibo, the province's capital. The name Ati-Atihan means "to imitate the Ati people".

The festival consists of religious processions and street-parades, showcasing themed floats, dancing groups wearing colorful costumes, marching bands, and people sporting face and body paints. The street parade is known as Sadsad, which is also what the locals call their way of dancing where the foot is momentarily dragged along the ground in tune to the beat played by the marching bands.

Being believed to be the oldest festival in the Philippines and having inspired other popular Philippine festivals such as Dinagyang of Iloilo and Sinulog of Cebu, it is regarded as the 'Mother of All Philippine Festivals.'

== History ==
The origins of the Ati-Atihan celebration date back to 1212 AD, after a group of 10 Malay chieftains called ‘Datus’ fleeing from the island of Borneo settled on the island of Panay in the Philippines and were granted settlement by the Ati people. The celebration with a relation to Santo Niño known as the Fiesta de Santo Niño, dates back to at least the 17th century. It was part of the Catholic "fiesta system" employed by the Spanish colonial government to reinforce the reducciones policy that aimed to resettle natives on planned settlements built around a local church. In the 1950s, the festival, along with similar fiestas around the country celebrating the Santo Niño (like the Sinulog and Dinagyang) increasingly began to resemble the Brazilian Carnival and the New Orleans Mardi Gras, incorporating music, street dancing, and body painting. By the 1960s, the festival became even more commercialized as the Philippine Department of Tourism heavily promoted local festivals to national prominence. The festival now included elaborate exotic costumes (inspired by tribal attire from Papua New Guinea, Africa, and India). It culminated in 1972, when the festival's name was officially changed to Ati-Atihan.

The festivity is claimed to have originally been a native animist celebration of the anito (ancestor spirits), to which Spanish missionaries gradually added a Christian meaning. The festival is also linked to the epic Maragtas. The epic claims that a group of 10 Malay chieftains, led by Datu Puti, fled the island of Borneo in the 13th century and landed on the island of Panay. Datu Puti made a trade with the Ati people and purchased the lowlands for a golden salakot, brass basins and bales of cloth. They gave a very long necklace to the wife of the Ati chieftain. Feasting and festivities followed soon after. Some time later, the Ati people were struggling with famine as the result of a bad harvest. They were forced to descend from their mountain village into the settlement below, to seek the generosity of the people who now lived there. The datu obliged and gave them food. In return, the Ati danced and sang for them, grateful for the gifts they had been given.

However, the historicity of the Maragtas epic is now being questioned by modern historians, despite being once widely included in school textbooks and associated with the Ati-Atihan Festival. The claim of its origins from the Maragtas or the Ati people is a modern addition, like its name.

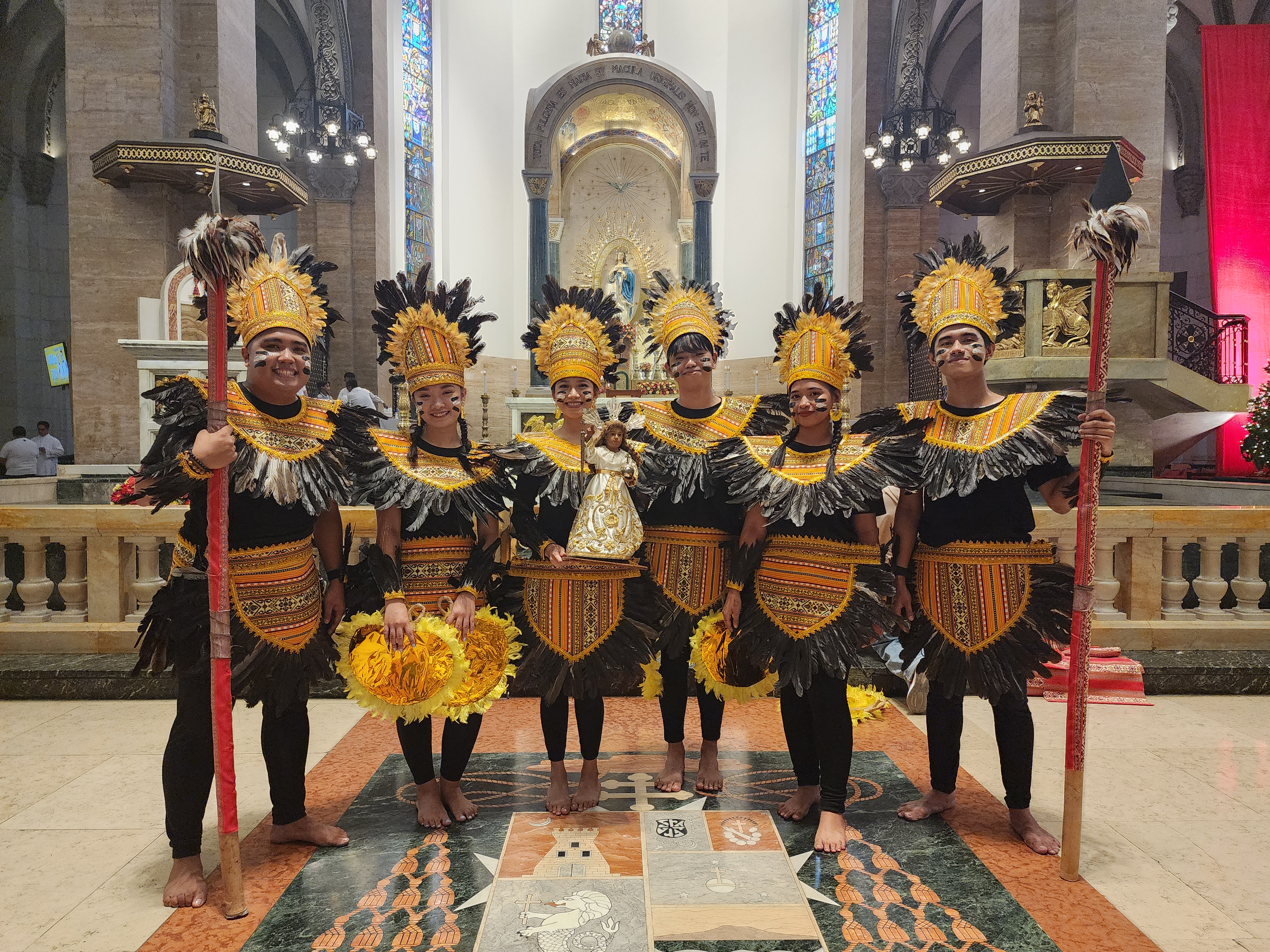
Performers dressed in Ati-Atihan costume at the Manila Cathedral in 2025.

In 2012, the National Commission for Culture and the Arts (NCCA) and the ICHCAP of UNESCO published Pinagmulan: Enumeration from the Philippine Inventory of Intangible Cultural Heritage. The first edition of the UNESCO-backed book included the Ati-atihan Festival, signifying its great importance to Philippine intangible cultural heritage. The local government of Aklan, in cooperation with the NCCA, is given the right to nominate the Ati-atihan Festival in the UNESCO Intangible Cultural Heritage Lists.

== Events ==
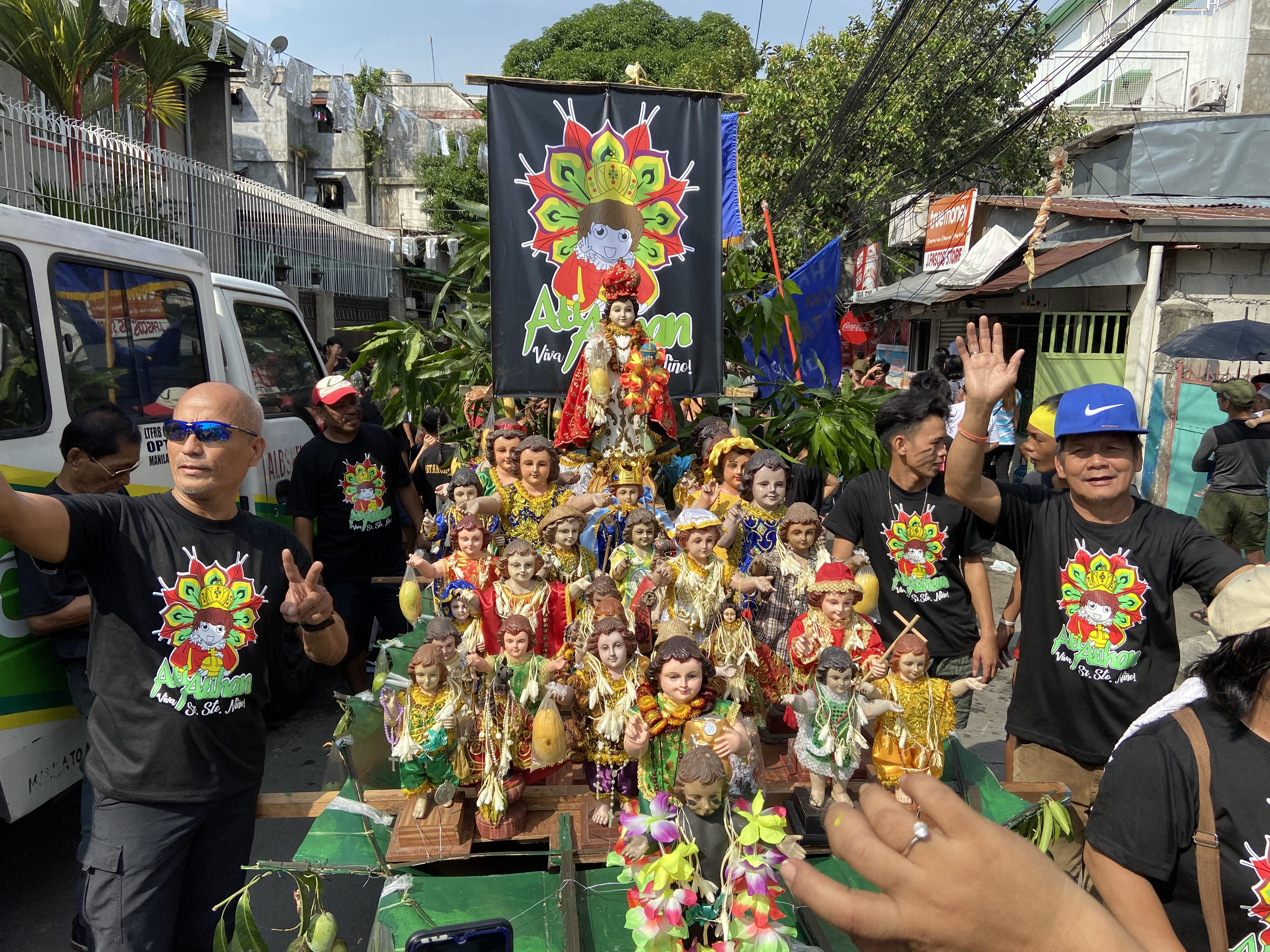
Parade celebration of Santo Niño

The formal opening mass during the first day of the celebration emphasizes the festival's religious event. The mass is followed by a procession accompanied by rhythmic drumbeats and dance parades along the street. The second day begins at dawn with a rosary procession and ends with a community mass and another dance parade. The highlight of the festival occurs on the last day, the third Sunday of January, when groups representing different tribes compete for tourists' attention and prizes. The festival ends with a procession of thousands of people carrying different kinds of images of Santo Niño.

== Celebrations in other places ==
Other towns in Aklan that celebrate the Ati-Atihan festival are Ibajay, Lezo, Malinao, Makato, Batan, Altavas, and Malay (Boracay Island). Several nearby towns of Antique and Capiz also hold the Ati-Atihan festival.

Other festivals held in the region with similar themes include the Dinagyang of Iloilo, the Halaran of Capiz, and the Binirayan of Antique.

== Controversies ==
The initial Ati-Atihan is believed to not originally include the Ati people (commonly misidentified with the Aeta people of Luzon) in the dances as the dancers were traditionally non-Ati natives who danced to give their gratitude towards the Ati people after the Ati welcomed them to the Ati homelands. In later years, Ati people also participated in the dance. The use of blackface continues to be a topic of discussion. Currently, no documentation exists to disprove that the coloring of the face and body of non-natives in the Ati-Atihan festival constitutes blackface. The use of blackface has been contested for its alleged traditional significance because there is no historical evidence to confirm it as an original part of the practice. It has also not been proven to be accepted by the Ati people, in consensus, as a means of honoring them. Some articles regarding the Ati-Atihan festival have misconstrued its purpose to "honor" the Ati people when, in fact, it is stated:

"performers of the Ati-Atihan Festival wear black soot to pretend to as Atis, dark-skinned indigenous peoples, who historians believed to be the first inhabitants of the Philippines. The celebration also honors the Sto. Niño or the Child Jesus."

The article by Catalina Ricci S. Madarang has been previously misconstrued to mean they "honor" the Ati people via blackface when in fact it was done to mimic their appearance and in addition the festival was done to "honor" Santo Nino.

== See also ==
- Ati people
- Dinagyang
- Sinulog
- Santo Niño (disambiguation)
