= Binirayan festival =

Annual Philippine cultural festival

Binirayan Festival
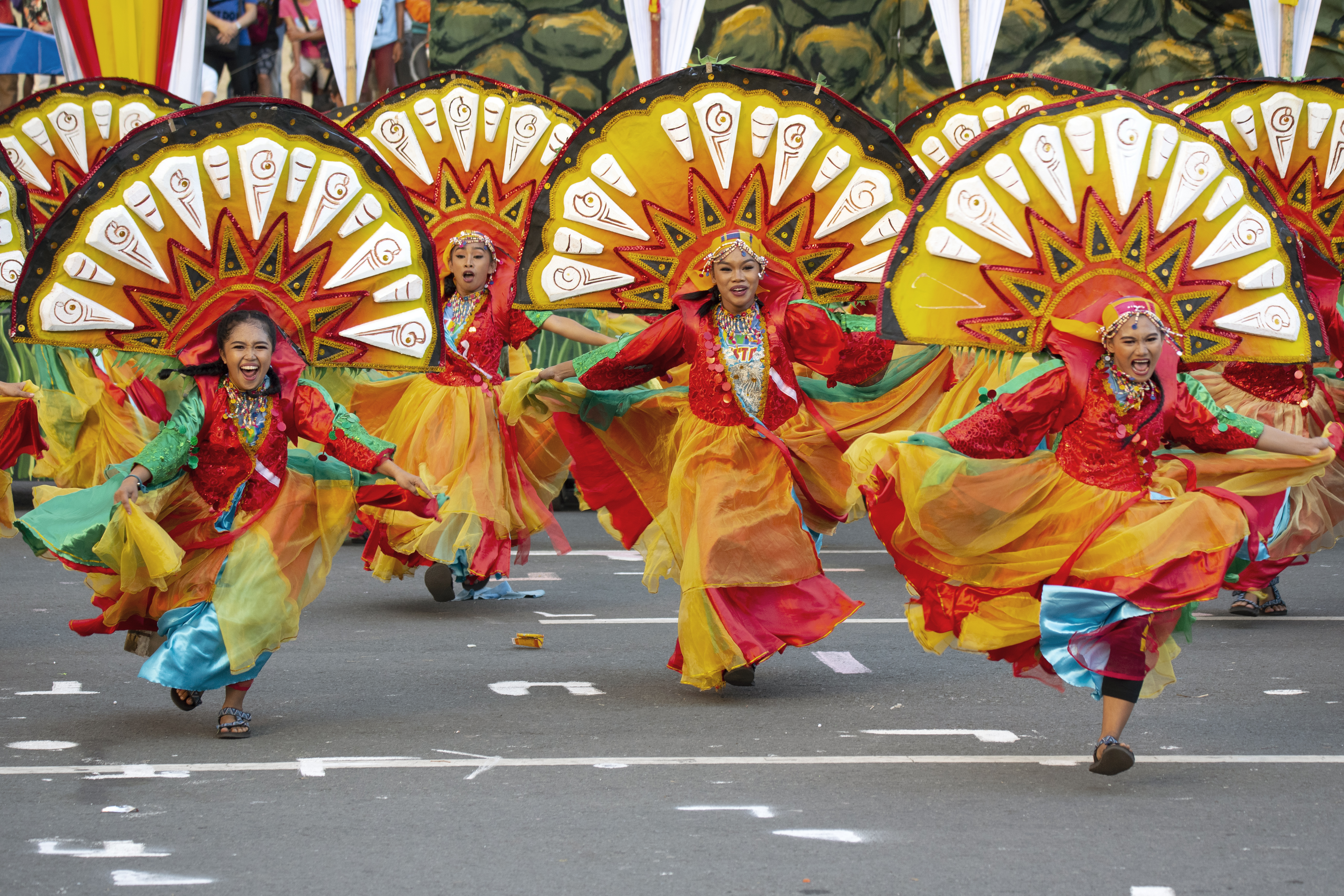
- Binirayan Festival Dancers
- Observed by: Antique, Philippines
- Type: Festival
- Date: December
- Duration: 2 days
- Frequency: annual

The Binirayan Festival is an annual month-long cultural festival in the province of Antique, Philippines, held every December.

The festival commemorates the arrival of Malay migrants prior to the Spanish conquest, as documented in Maragtas, a compilation of legends and oral history by Pedro Alcantara Monteclaro.

== Etymology ==
Binirayan comes from the Karay-a word biray, which translates to sailboat. The word Binirayan literally means "where they sailed to".

== Date of celebration ==
The festival was conceived by Governor Evelio Javier, and first celebrated on January 11–13, 1974. In 1975, the festival was moved to April 25–27, but in the succeeding years was celebrated in December to coincide with the Christmas celebration in the province. In 1981, with the assumption of Governor Enrique A. Zaldivar, it was moved back to April. The festival was not celebrated in 1980, 1984–1987, and 1995 due to political crises. Consequently, the dates of the festival, which has become one of the major festivals in the Western Visayas region has suffered inconsistency with the every change in leadership of the province. In 2002, however, the provincial board of Antique passed a resolution fixing the date of the celebration in April, and when the management of the festival was given to Binirayan Foundation, Inc. the dates were set on the third weekend of April.

In 2011, the date was again changed to December, and ever since, it is being celebrated every December.

== Purpose ==
The Binirayan Festival commemorates the legend of the arrival of the ten Bornean datus on the island of Aninipay now known as Panay. (See the legend of Maragtas.) As Governor Evelio B. Javier, the Father of Binirayan Festival, reminded the Antiqueños during the earlier celebrations, "let us gather the strands and memories of our past, as we look back with pride, that we may look ahead with confidence to Antique tomorrow."

Binirayan Festival's permanent theme is "Retracing Roots, Celebrating Culture and Greatness."

== Events ==
The festival opens with a fluvial parade from the Pantalan port to Malandog Beach in Hamtic, believed to be the original settlement of the Bornean datu. In Malandog is a historical marker commemorating this legendary event. There are beauty pageants, cultural shows, street dancing, parades, and arts and crafts local products exhibits. In 2006, the Binirayan Foundation introduced the Komedya Antiqueña as a sub-festival to promote the komedyas traditional folk theater.

=== From Ati-ati to Malay-ati ===
The ati-ati, now popularly known as "ati-atihan" in Philippine fiestas, used to be one of the main events of the festival. Patterned after the famous ati-ati of Aklan, the Binirayan ati-ati is participated in by people of all walks of life painting their faces with black soot. A tribe competition is held among towns and barangays. The popular tribes during the first decade of the festival were Tribu Kamihanon (Bgy 8), Tribu Bukaka (Bgy 2), Tribu Karintukay Dagatnon (Marina) and Tribu Campan (Kampo-Pantalan). Tribu Kaunlaran (Bgy 3) of Comon under then tribe trainer and choreographer Herman Cortez became a regular winner, that they represented the province in 1981 in the Dinagyang Festival in Iloilo City as Tribu Binirayan. Tribu Binirayan emerged Champion in 1983, the first-ever non-Ilonggo tribe to win the competition. It also boosted the popularity of Binirayan Festival as a major festival in Region VI. In later years, however, the high cost of maintaining tribes, prevented many tribes join the ati-ati competition. In 2001, the Binirayan Executive Committee repackaged the competition as Malay-Ati competition to introduce the idea that the Malays and Ati were the ancestors of the Antiqueños. Current Malay-Ati performances show historical events, folk practices and lifestyles in Antique. The competition in April 2008 was a best of the best among festivals in the province.

== Antique International Marathon ==
In 2017, a new event is being slated, the Antique International Marathon (AIM). It aims to showcase the pristine nature and hassle free lifestyle of the Antiqueños. It also intends to put the province at the center of sports tourism in the country. AIM will also spark the enthusiasm of the Antiqueños and everyone else to get into sports, go outdoors and have a healthy lifestyle.

Part of the Registration Fee (10.00) will go to the beautification/upkeep of the Malandog River. Malandog River is the site where the Landing of the Ten Malayan Datus took place.

== The Binirayan Confab ==
In 2007, Binirayan Foundation convened the Binirayan Confab (initially billed as Binirayan Summit) as a gathering of scholars, academicians, researchers, artists, cultural workers, and almost anyone interested in "Antiqueniana." The confab serves as the intellectual strand of the festival, because according to the organizers, to make the Binirayan Festival closer to its vision of bringing together Antiqueños to look at their past with pride, and look ahead with confidence. The Binirayan festival is not all raucous revelry, but also a time to think about which direction the province takes.
