= Ati language (Philippines) =

Austronesian language spoken in Philippines

Ati
- Inati
- Native to: Philippines
- Region: Panay
- Ethnicity: Ati people
- Native speakers: (1,500 cited 1980)
- Language family: Austronesian: Malayo-Polynesian; Philippine; Ati

Language codes
- ISO 639-3: atk
- Glottolog: atii1237
- ELP: Ati (Philippines)

Ati (Inati), or Binisaya nga Inati, is an Austronesian language of the island of Panay in the Philippines. The variety spoken in northern Panay is also called Sogodnin. The Ati people also speak Kinaray-a and Hiligaynon.

== Classification ==
Pennoyer (1987) and Reid (2013) consider Inati to be an isolate within the Philippine languages. It differs markedly from the Visayan languages and has many features not found in the Central Philippine languages.

Inati shows some unique sound changes.

- Proto-Malayo-Polynesian *R > Inati /d/, such as PMP *liʔəR > Inati /liʔad/
- Proto-Malayo-Polynesian *ə > Inati /a/ (as in the Central Luzon languages), not PMP *ə > /u/ or /ə/, as in the Visayan languages

== Distribution and dialects ==
Lobel (2013:75) lists the following Ati communities in the Philippines, with populations given in parentheses:

- Iloilo (1,902): Anilao (341), Barotac Viejo (867), Cabatuan (31), Calinog (163), Dueñas (43), Dumangas (50), Janiuay (22), New Lucena (59), Passi (103), San Miguel (17), San Rafael (110), Santa Barbara (12), Tigbauan (69), San Joaquin (15)
- Antique (4,680): Anini-y (156), Hamtic (3,081), Tobias Fornier (1,383), San Jose (60)
- Capiz (308): Dumarao (308)
- Aklan (740+): Buruanga (?), Malay (740)
- Guimaras (789): Buenavista (189), Jordan (237), Sibunag (178), Nueva Valencia (185)
- Negros Occidental (309): Isabela (309)
- Romblon: Odiongan and Calatrava on Tablas Island, and San Jose on Carabao Island (unknown population size)

Baruah (2000) lists the following locations:

- Antique: Culuasi, Hamtic, San Jose, Sibalom, Tobias
  - Tina, Hamtic, Antique (512 people)
- Capiz: Dumarao
- Iloilo: Janiuay, Anilao, Cabatuan, Duenas, Dumangas, Mina, New Lucena, Passi, San Miguel, San Joaquin, San Rafael, Santa Barbara, Tigbauan
  - Nagpana, Barotac Viejo, Iloilo (500 people)
- Aklan
  - Barangay Sabang, Buruanga, Aklan (4 households, 15 people)
  - Barangay Jesuna, Nabas, Aklan (3 households, 20 people)
  - In Malay, Aklan: Barangays Argao, Cubay Norte, Cubay Sur, Cogon, Boracay (total: 63 households, 321 people)

Pennoyer (1987) reports that Sogodnin is spoken by a few remaining speakers in Cogon, Malay (whose ancestors had moved from interior Sabang to Bakirohan to Cogon), and on Carabao and Boracay islands.

Ethnologue reports two dialects for Ati:

Malay (not to be confused with Malay, Malaysia.) and Barotac Viejo Nagpana. Ethnologue states that Barotac Viejo Nagpana is the prestige dialect.

== Phonology ==
Consonants
	Labial	Alveolar	Palatal	Velar	Glottal
Plosive	p b	t d	(tʃ) (dʒ)	k g	ʔ
Fricative		s	(ʃ)		(h)
Nasal	m	n		ŋ	
Approximant	w	l, (r)	j		

- The consonants in parentheses are not phonemic.

Vowels
	Front	Central	Back
High	i	ɨ	
Mid	e		o
Low		a	

== Works cited ==
- Baruah, Karabi (2000). "A Forgotten People: The Ati Community of Aklan". Philippine Quarterly of Culture and Society. 28 (3): 301–316. JSTOR 29792465.
- Lobel, Jason William (2013). Philippine and North Bornean Languages: Issues in Description, Subgrouping, and Reconstruction (PDF) (Ph.D. thesis). University of Hawai'i at Manoa. hdl:10125/101972.
- Reid, Lawrence (2013). "Who Are the Philippine Negritos? Evidence from Language". Human Biology. 85 (1). Article 15. doi:10.3378/027.085.0316. PMID 24297232. S2CID 8341240.
- Pennoyer, Douglas F. (1987). "Inati: the Hidden Negrito Language of Panay, Philippines" (PDF). Philippine Journal of Linguistics. 18/19: 1–36.
