= Ati people =

Ethnic group of the Philippines

Ati
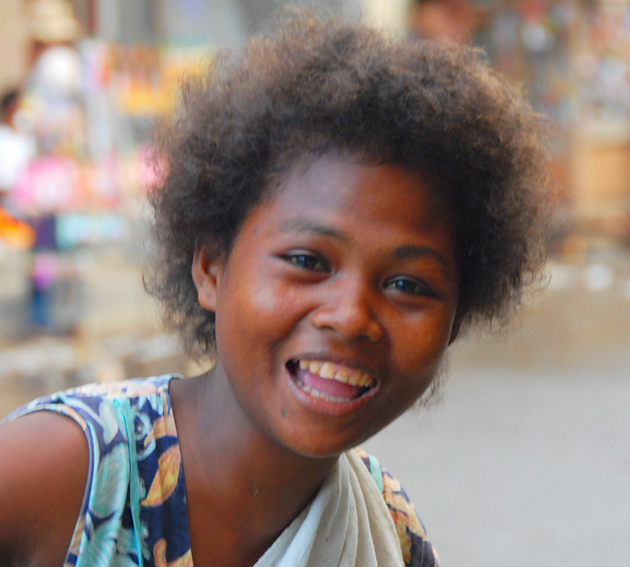
- An Ati woman in Kalibo on Panay, Philippines

Total population
- 55,473 (2020 census) (1980: 1,500 speakers of Ati)

Regions with significant populations
- Philippines; Western Visayas; Negros Island Region (NIR)

Languages
- Ati, Aklanon, Hiligaynon, Tagalog, English

Religion
- Animism, Christianity (Roman Catholic)

Related ethnic groups
- Other Negritos, Visayans, and Filipinos

The Ati are a Negrito ethnic group and indigenous peoples in the Visayan Islands of the Philippines. Their small numbers are principally concentrated on the islands of Boracay, Panay and Negros. They are genetically related to other Negrito ethnic groups in the Philippines such as the Aeta of Luzon, the Batak of Palawan, the Agta of the Sierra Madres, and the Mamanwa of Mindanao.

== History ==
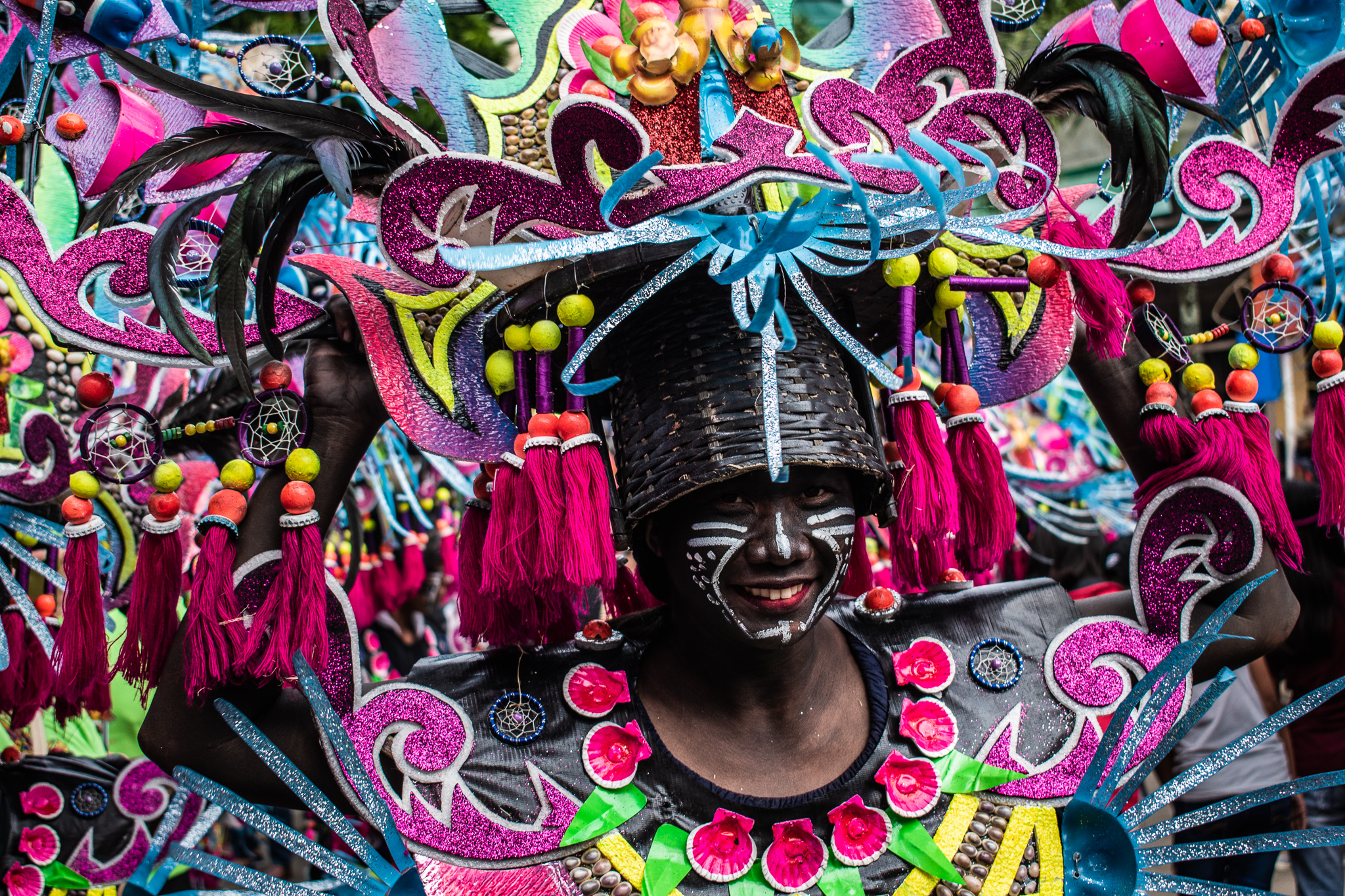
A woman at the Kalibo Ati-Atihan Festival

=== Early history ===
The Negritos are the descendants of the same early East Eurasian meta-population, which also gave rise to modern East Asians and Australasians, among other populations of the Asia-Pacific region. The earliest modern human migrations into the Philippine archipelago were during the Paleolithic, around 40,000 years ago, followed by two other migration waves between 25,000 and 12,000 years ago, through the Sundaland land bridges that linked the islands with the Asian mainland. The latest migration wave is associated with the Austronesian peoples (c. 7,000 years ago) from Taiwan. The Philippine Negritos display relatively closer genetic affinity towards different Eastern Asian populations, prehistoric Hoabinhian samples, as well as to the Indigenous people of New Guinea and Aboriginal Australians, from which they diverged around c. 40,000 years ago, and also display genetic substructure along a North to South cline, suggesting their ancestral population diverged into two subgroups after the initial peopling of the Philippines. Furthermore, they display high percentages of Denisovan gene flow.

Legends, such as those involving the Ten Bornean Datus and the Binirayan Festival, tell tales about how, at the beginning of the 12th century when Indonesia and the Philippines were under the rule of Indianized native kingdoms, the ancestors of the Bisaya escaped from Borneo and from the persecution of Rajah Makatunaw. Led by Datu Puti and Datu Sumakwel and sailing with boats called balangays, they landed near a river called Suaragan, on the southwest coast of Panay, (the place then known as Aninipay), and bartered the land from an Ati headman named Polpolan and his son Marikudo for the price of a necklace and one golden salakot. The hills were left to the Atis while the plains and rivers to the Malays. This meeting is commemorated through the Ati-atihan festival. This legend, though, is challenged by some historians.

=== Colonial era history ===
During Spanish colonization, the tribe made contact with the conquistador Miguel Lopez de Legazpi and were exploited in his colonization of Panay. A 1905 report documented a significant population on Boracay island and the western part of Panay island.

=== During the Marcos dictatorship ===
On Nov. 10, 1978, six years after the declaration of Martial Law under Ferdinand Marcos, 65 Philippine islands including Boracay was declared "tourist zones and marine reserves" without any mention of the status of the Ati who were the original residents of the island. This de facto dispossession of Ati lands on Boracay by Marcos placed the islands under the control of the Philippine Tourism Authority, and marked the beginning of rapid development on the island, which resulted in the further marginalization of the Boracay Ati for decades.

== Demographics ==
=== Language ===
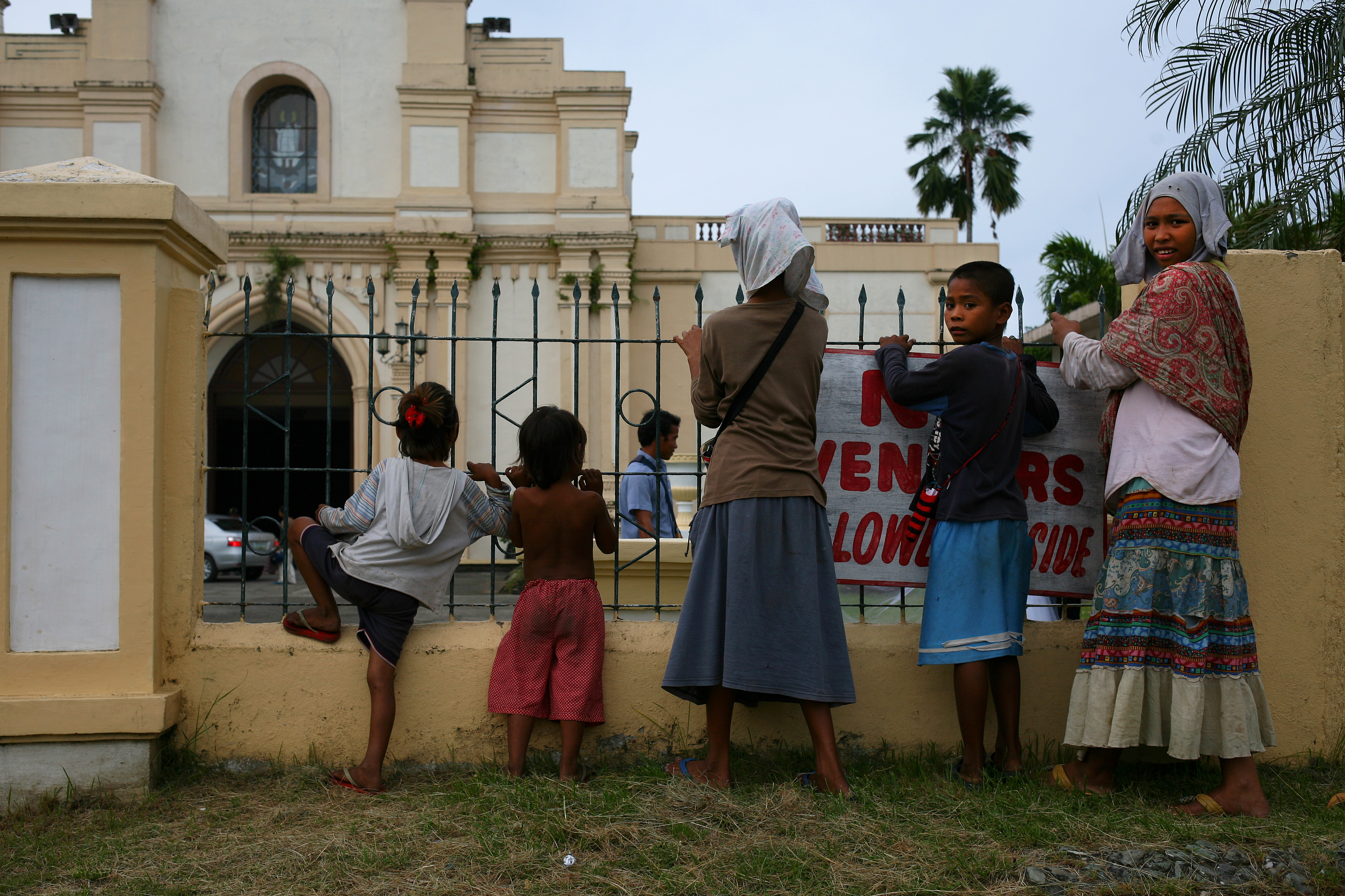
An Ati family in Kalibo, Aklan

The Ati speak a distinct language known as Inati. According to a census in 1980, speakers of Inati number about 1,500. Hiligaynon and Kinaray-a are also commonly used.

=== Religion ===
The Ati practice a form of animism that involves good and evil spirits. These spirits are nature spirits that often guard rivers, the sea, the sky, as well as the mountains. Sometimes, they may cause disease or comfort. The Ati from Negros refer to them as taglugar or tagapuyo, which literally means "inhabiting a place." Christianity has also been adopted due to less isolation and more contact with "outsiders."

== Ancestral lands ==
The National Commission on Indigenous Peoples (NCIP) granted the Ati community on Boracay a certificate of ancestral domain title (CADT) in 2010.

Atis were harassed and threatened in 2012 on two occasions by men identified with resort owners and local officials. Ati youth leader Dexter Condez was killed on February 22, 2013. The killings have not yet been resolved.

The Supreme Court upheld the CADT in 2019 in favor of Atis against legal challenges mounted by private claimants.

In 2018, four Certificates of Land Ownership Awards (CLOAs) for 3.2 hectares of agricultural land were granted to Ati communities as part of the national land reform program. Ati farmers now grow dragon fruit, banana, lemongrass, papaya, and vegetables on the land.

== Culture ==
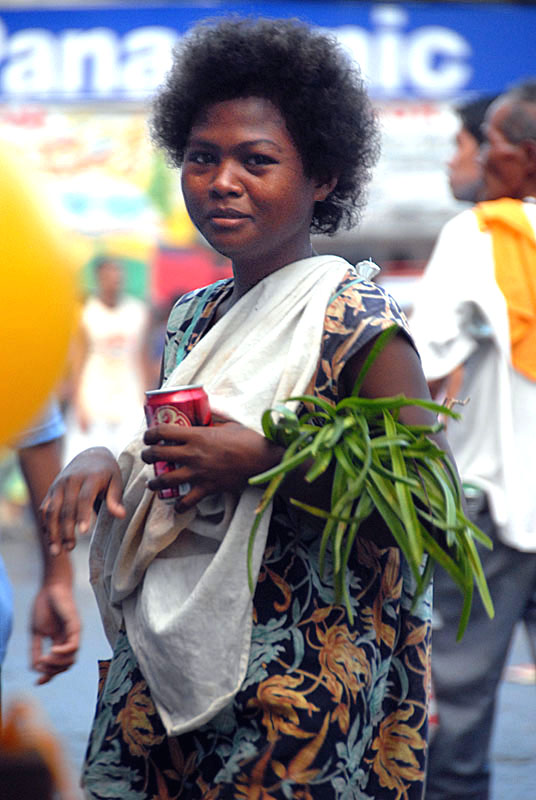
Ati woman in Panay

=== Clothing ===
Not too long ago, like other Negritos in the country, their clothing was simple, with women wearing wraparound skirts, sometimes made out of bark cloth, and men wearing loincloths. However today T-shirts, pants, and rubber sandals are common as daily clothes.

Jewelry is simple in nature. Some jewelry objects involve plants such as flowers, while others use animal bones; particularly the teeth of pigs.

=== Medicine ===
Ati are known in Panay as practitioners of herbal medicine. Locals often seek their help in removing leeches from a person's body.

=== Mobility ===
The Negritos traditionally were nomadic people, with the Ati of Panay being known as the most mobile. Now they live in more permanent settlements like Barotac Viejo, island of Guimaras, Igkaputol (Dao), Tina (Hamtic) and Badiang (San Jose de Buenavista). The famous island of Boracay is still regarded as their ancestral land as the area known as Takbuyan, between the municipalities of Tobias Fournier (Dao) and San Joaquin, on the southwestern coast of Panay. Very few of them are now nomadic (mostly women with small children). Ati men traditionally join 'sacadas' workers at the time of harvest of sugar plants in places such as Negros or Batangas.

=== Festivals ===
The Ati are the central attraction in the Ati-atihan festival, a festival named in their honor. It is said that the festival is held to commemorate the first appearance of the Roman Catholic Church and the Spaniards in the province of Aklan. According to oral tradition, the Ati helped the Spaniards conquer the native Visayans and, as a reward, the tribe was given a statue of the Santo Niño.

In the Dinagyang festival of Iloilo City, also on Panay, performers are also painted to look supposedly like Ati and are organized into "tribes", called "tribus", to perform dances with drums, as the Atis are supposed to have done when the Austronesians arrived and bought Panay from the Ati. Dinagyang is held to celebrate this purchase as well as the arrival in Iloilo of the Santo Niño statue. When the statue first arrived in 1967, a tribe from the Ati-atihan festival was invited to Iloilo to mark the occasion.

== Atis of Boracay ==
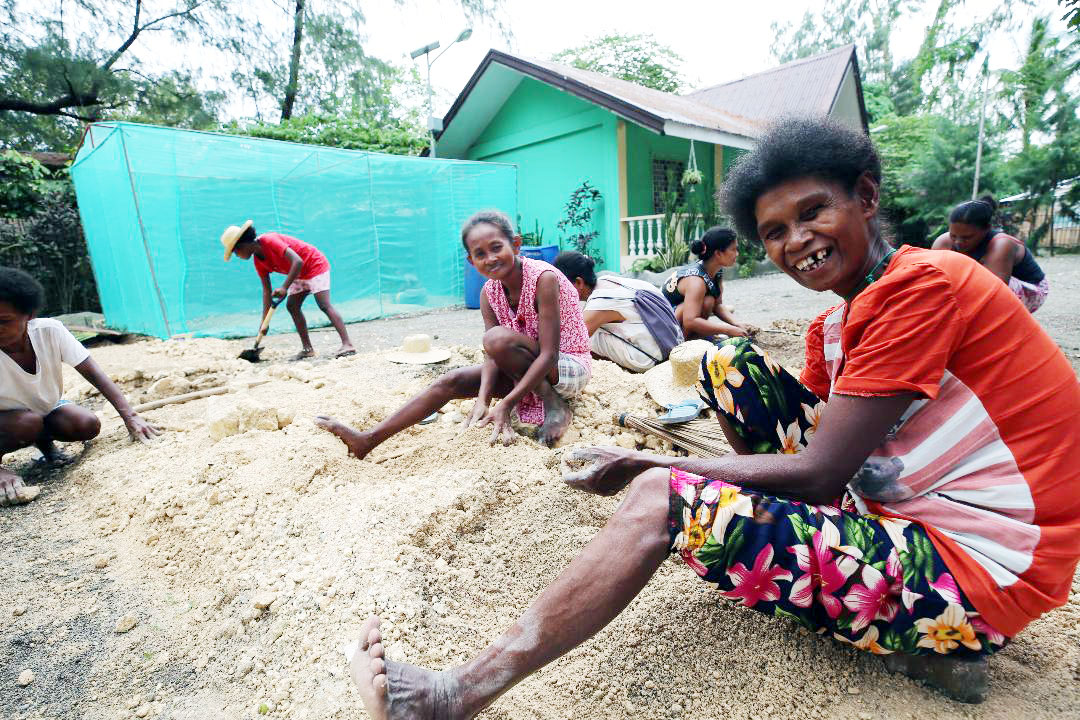
Ati tribe members cultivate the warm sand in Barangay Manoc-manoc in Malay, Aklan.

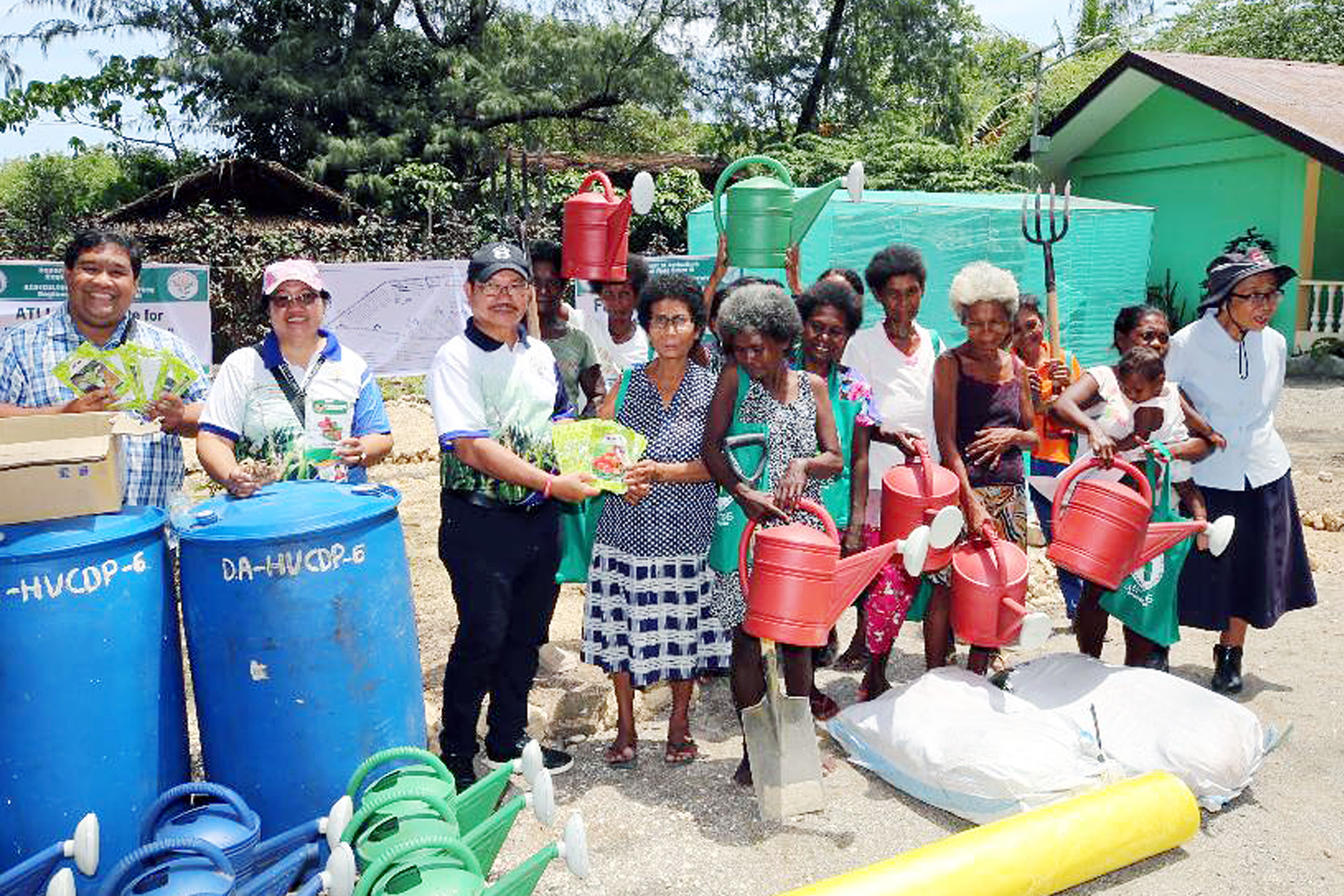
Ati people receiving agricultural tools from the Philippine government during the 2018 Boracay closure and redevelopment

Atis were the original inhabitants of Boracay island. As the island gained fame, Atis were pushed away. They lost their lands and many were rendered homeless. Consequently, many migrated to the Caticlan mainland. However, President Duterte took the initiative for land reforms. In November 2018, land titles of 3.2 hectares (7.9 acres) were handed over to the Atis. About one percent of the roughly 1,000-hectare (2,500-acre) area of the island. The lack of education and discrimination remain issues faced by the Atis of Boracay in recent times.

The Philippine government through the Technical Education and Skills Development Authority (TESDA) has made efforts to increase Ati employability through scholarships for culinary and aesthetics training programs. Upon completion of these programs, they will graduate with a nationally recognized certificate. The government is also making an effort to create employment opportunities; in 2019, the Aklan provincial government hired two full-time employees from the Ati community to oversee the crop production in the Ati Greenhouse which was set up as a source of income for the Ati community.
