= Dinagyang =

Annual festival in Iloilo City, Philippines

Dinagyang Festival
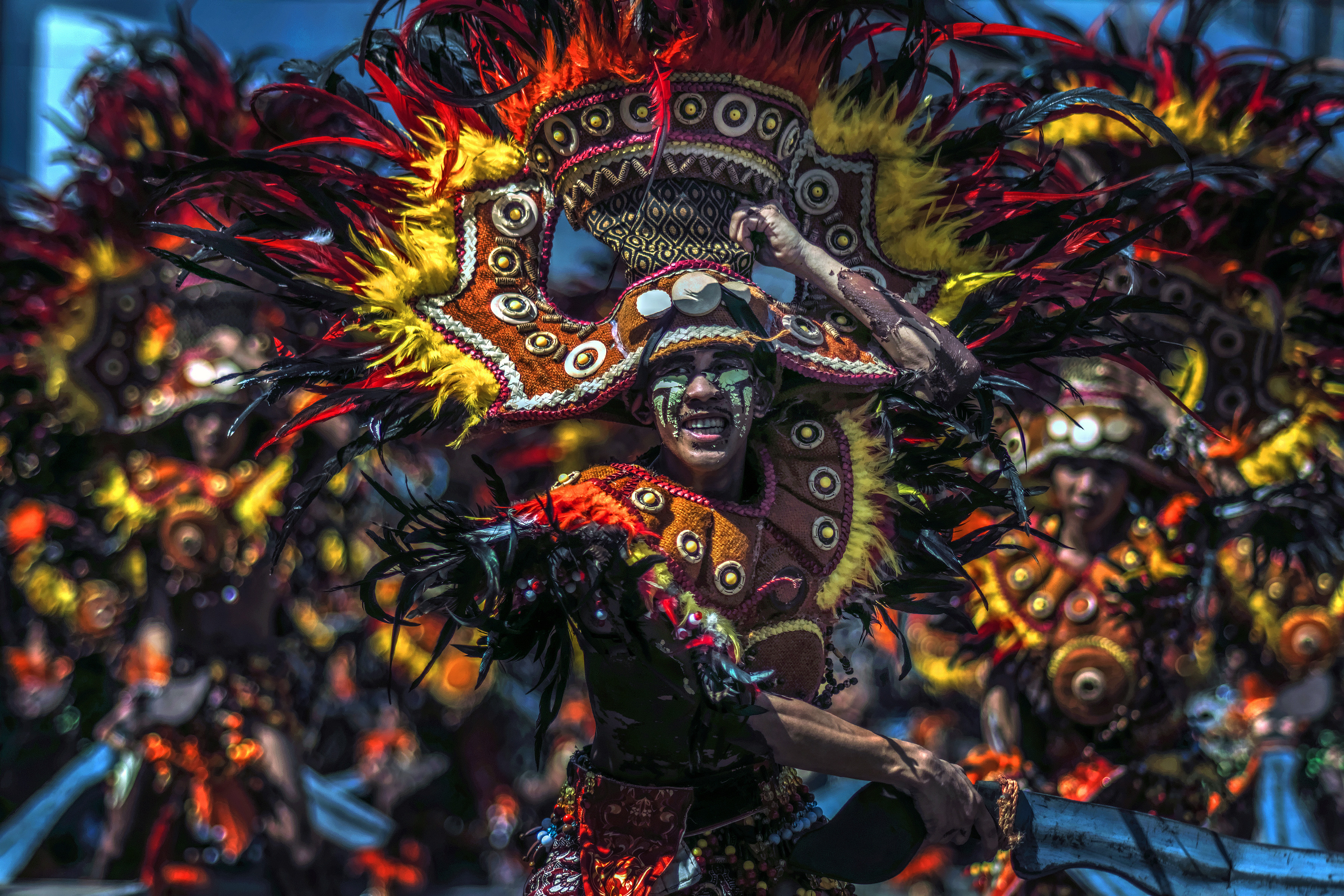
- A performer dressed as an Ati warrior during the Ati Tribes Competition
- Official name: Iloilo Dinagyang Festival
- Also called: Dinagyang
- Observed by: Iloilo City
- Type: Religious / Cultural
- Significance: In honor of the Holy Child, the traditions and history of the Ati people, and the 'Barter of Panay'
- Celebrations: Parades, street dancing, fluvial and street processions, solemn masses, parties
- Date: Fourth Sunday in January
- 2025 date: January 26
- 2026 date: January 25
- 2027 date: January 24
- 2028 date: January 23
- Frequency: Annual
- First time: 1968; 58 years ago
- Related to: Feast of Santo Niño, Sinulog, Ati-Atihan, Maragtas

The Dinagyang Festival is a religious and cultural festival held annually on the fourth Sunday of January in Iloilo City, Philippines, in honor of Santo Niño, the Holy Child, and to commemorate the historic pact between the Malay settlers and the indigenous Ati people of Panay. It is considered one of the largest festivals in the Philippines, attracting 1 to 2 million people during the weekend celebration.

The festival is renowned for its Ati Tribes Competition, where tribu or tribal performers in "Ati warrior" costumes with large feathered headdresses present choreographed formations, rhythmic chanting, and drum performances depicting the history of Panay. Other highlights include the Kasadyahan Festival, which showcases cultural festivals from various parts of Western Visayas, and ILOmination, a night parade with tribal performers in illuminated costumes. The main weekend festivities also include religious processions and street parties.

== Etymology ==
The word Dinágyang came from a Hiligaynon word extrapolated from dágyang, meaning "merrymaking." The term was coined by the late broadcaster Pacifico Sudario in 1977 to name the festival. Prior to that, the festival was known as the Iloilo Ati-atihan.

The festival celebrates the Santo Niño, the Holy Child (or Infant Jesus), and marks its arrival in Iloilo, while also commemorating the pact between the Datus and the indigenous Ati people following the arrival of the Malay settlers, the legendary barter of Panay Island from the natives, and the Maragtas story, which, though significant in local tradition, remains debated as either fact or myth.

== History ==
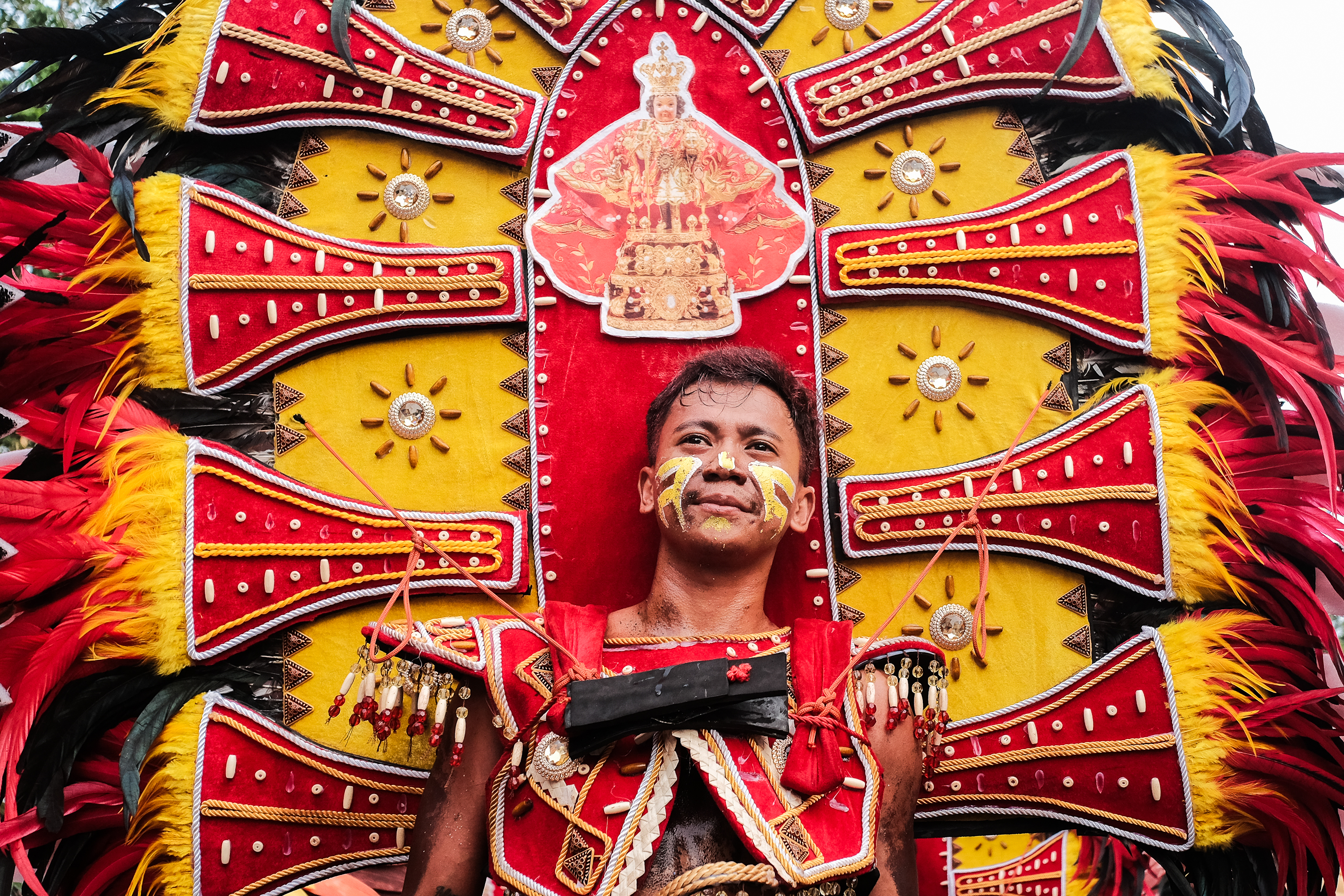
An Ati Tribe participant

Dinagyang, initially known as Iloilo Ati-Atihan, began after Rev. Fr. Ambrosio Galindez, the first Filipino Rector of the Augustinian Community and Parish Priest of the San Jose Parish introduced the devotion to Santo Niño in November 1967 after observing the Ati-Atihan Festival in the province of Aklan. On 1968, a replica of the original image of the Santo Niño de Cebu was brought to Iloilo by Fr. Sulpicio Enderez.

The people of Iloilo welcomed the image, along with followers from Cebu, upon its arrival at Mandurriao Airport.

"as a gift to the Parish of San Jose. The faithful, led by members of Confradia del Santo Niño de Cebu, Iloilo Chapter, worked to give the image a fitting reception starting at the Iloilo Airport and parading down the streets of Iloilo."

In the beginning, the observance of the feast was confined to the parish. The Confradia patterned the celebration on the Ati-Atihan of Ibajay, Aklan, where natives dance in the streets, their bodies covered with soot and ashes, to simulate the Atis dancing to celebrate the sale of Panay. It was these tribal groups who were the prototype of the present festival.

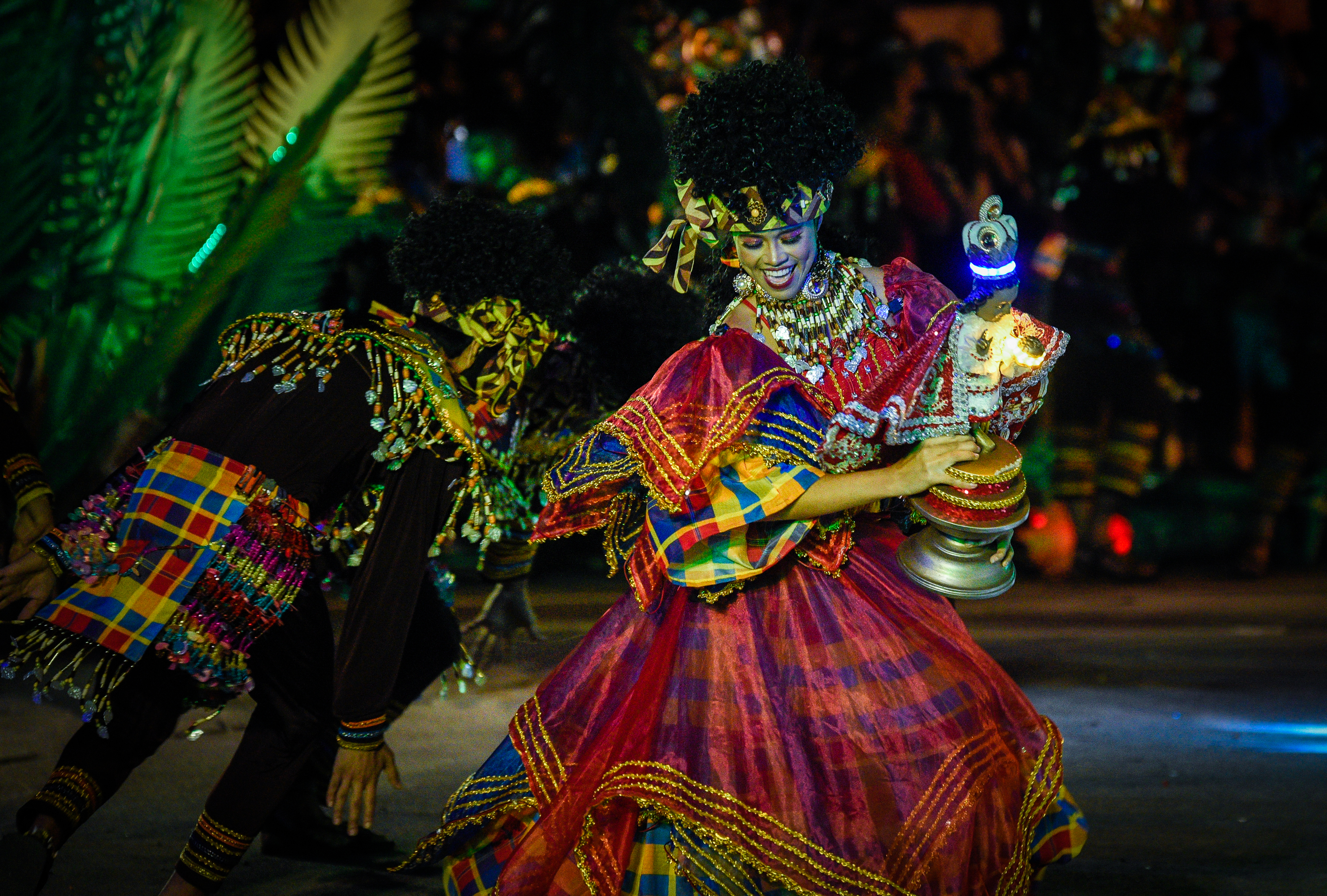
A performer holding an illuminated Santo Niño

In 1977, the Marcos government ordered the various regions of the Philippines to come up with festivals or celebrations that could boost tourism and development. The City of Iloilo readily identified the Iloilo Ati-Atihan as its project. At the same time, the local parish could no longer handle the growing challenges of the festival. The late Ilonggo broadcaster and writer Pacifico Sumagpao Sudario coined the term "Dinagyang" in 1977 to differentiate it from Aklan's Ati-Atihan. In that particular year, the Dinagyang organizers and by the Regional Association of National Government Executives invited an actual Ati tribe for the first time from the mountains of Barotac Viejo, and showcase their native dances during the event.

Since 1978, the Dinagyang Festival has grown into a significant religious and cultural event. The festival has now diversified to include other cultural presentations, sports competitions, food festivals, a beauty pageant, car shows, music festivals, and various side events. The Iloilo Festivals Foundation, Inc. (IFFI) currently manages and organizes the festival. They took over the responsibility from the Iloilo Dinagyang Foundation, Inc. (IDFI) in 2019 and also manage other major festivals in Iloilo, including the Paraw Regatta and Kasadyahan.

== Celebration ==
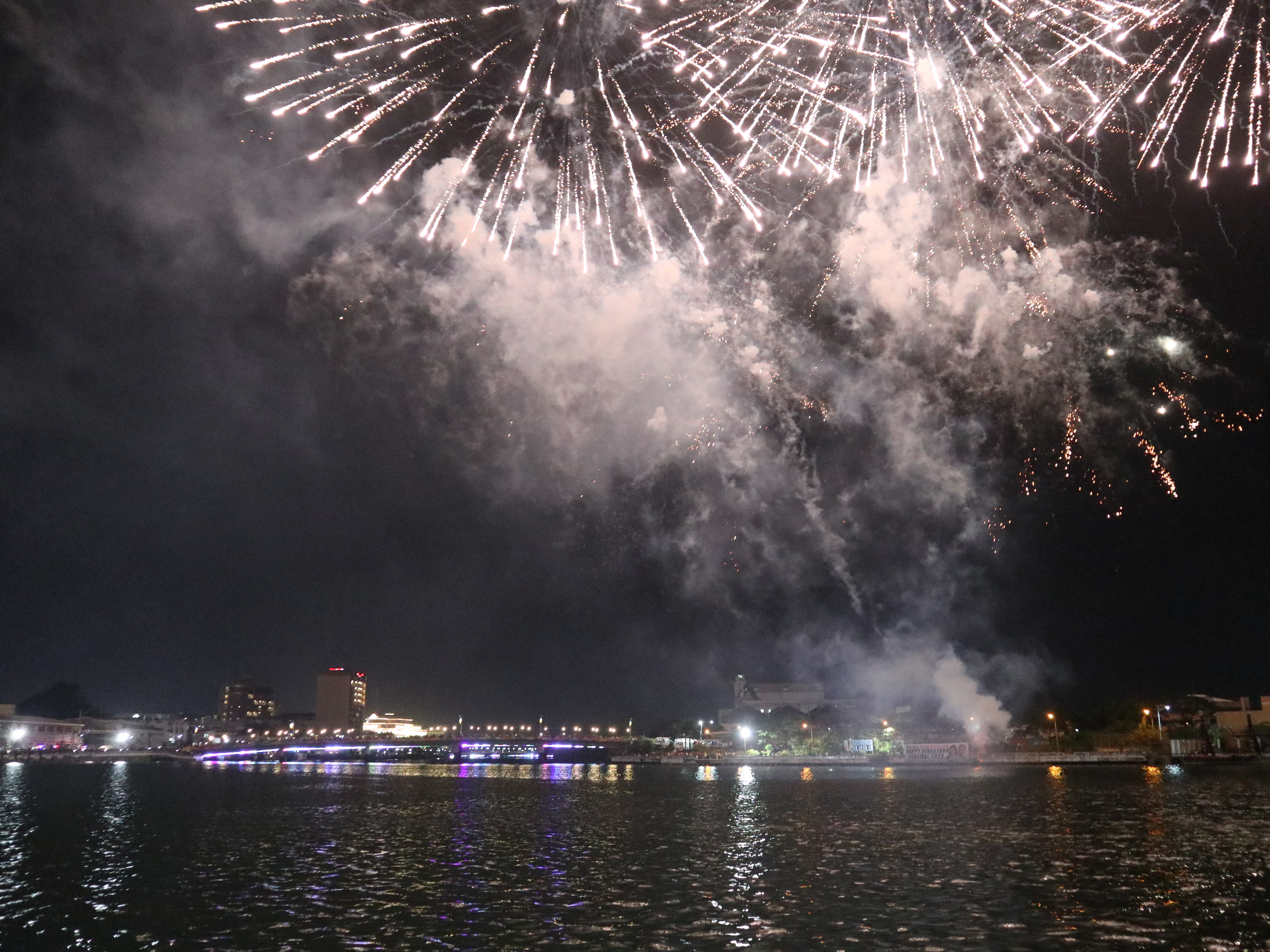
A fireworks display over the Iloilo River

The Dinagyang season officially begins during the Pamukaw (awakening), held annually in December, one month prior to the main celebration in January. This event signifies the official start of the festival.

The Opening Salvo of Dinagyang, which takes place annually on the second Friday of January, serves as a proclamation of the official beginning of the highlight week or the main celebration of the festival. It is also a preliminary to the three major events, which are held annually every fourth weekend of January: the Ati Tribes Competition (held on a Sunday), the Kasadyahan Festival (held on a Saturday), and the ILOmination and Floats Parade of Lights (held on a Friday).

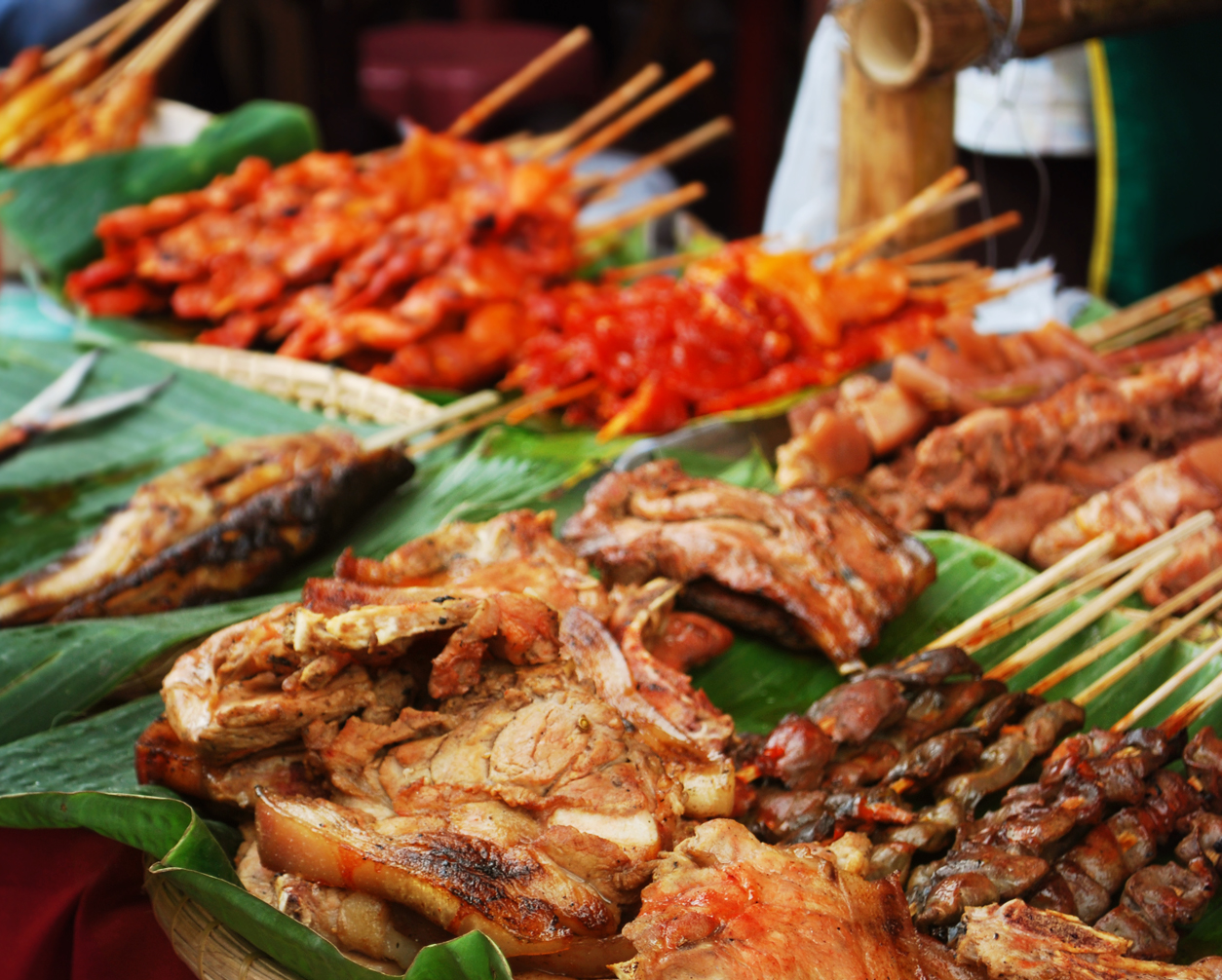
Grilled meats at a food fest

Other events that are highly celebrated during the highlight week of the festival are Sadsad (merrymaking), Food and Music Festivals, Fluvial and Motorcade Parades, and Miss Iloilo.

=== Kasadyahan Festival ===
The Kasadyahan Festival is one of the most anticipated events during the Dinagyang celebration. It is a competition among cultural festivals from different places in the Western Visayas region.

As an added attraction to the Ati Tribes competition, the Kasadyahan was introduced to the Dinagyang Festival in the 1980s to showcase the talents of students and the rich cultural heritage of Iloilo province. In its early years, schools from various towns and cities in the province participated in the competition. Over time, it evolved into a regional event, welcoming entries from other provinces in the Western Visayas region and highlighting the region’s diverse cultural and historical heritage.

In Dinagyang 2020, the Iloilo Festivals Foundation Inc. (IFFI) removed the Kasadyahan from the Dinagyang Festival. It was replaced by merry-making or the sadsad, a central feature of the Ati-Atihan Festival in Kalibo, Aklan. Plans were made to celebrate Kasadyahan in a separate month or possibly incorporate it into Iloilo City’s Charter Day festivities. However, these plans were canceled due to the pandemic.

The Kasadyahan Festival returned to the Dinagyang celebration in 2023, held on the Saturday before the main highlights of the Mardi Gras celebration the following day. In 2024, the Iloilo provincial government took over the management of the festival from the city government, rebranding it as Kasadyahan sa Kabanwahanan. The new iteration showcased various town festivals from Iloilo province competing for the title.

=== ILOmination and Parade of Lights ===
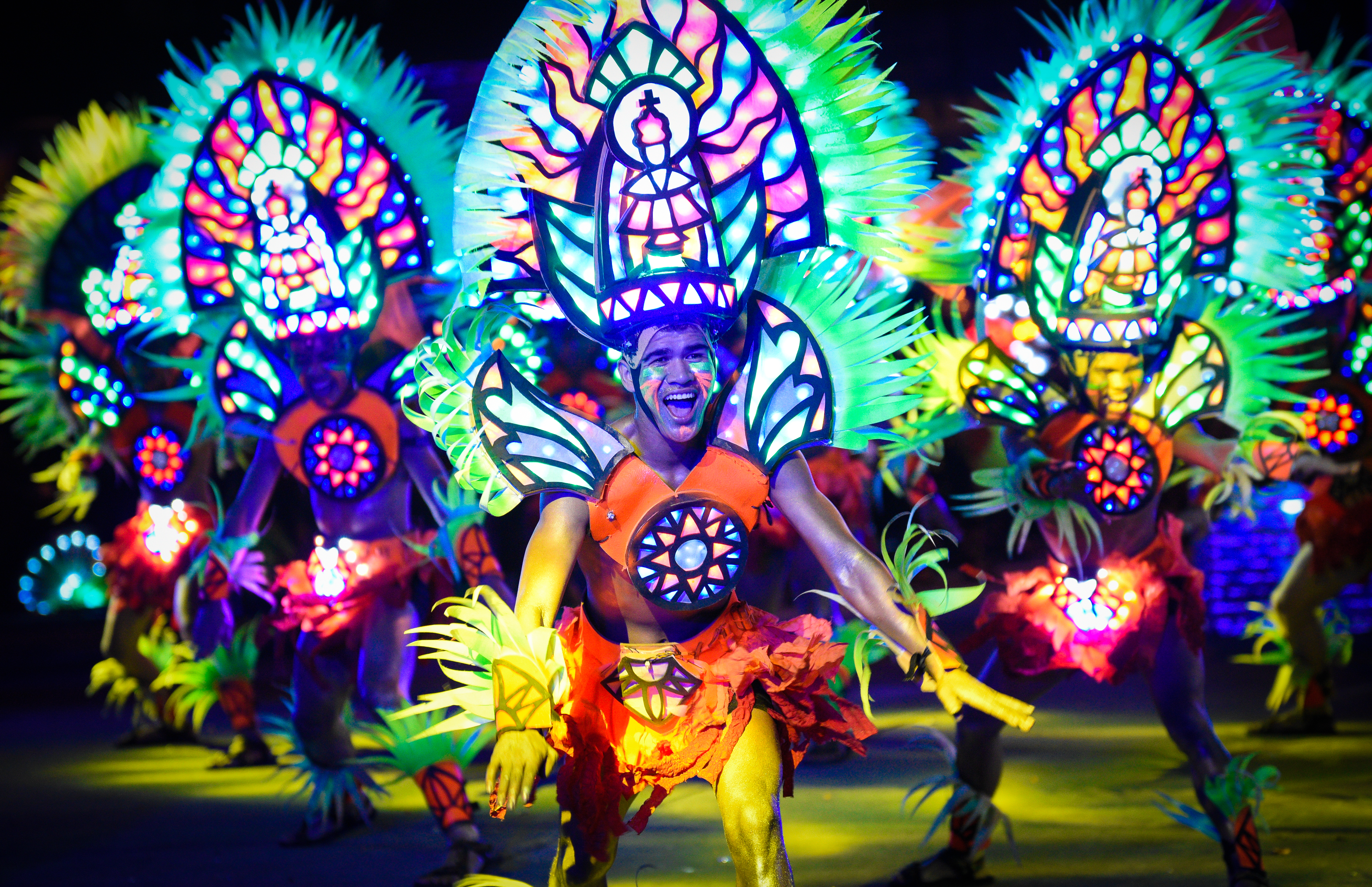
An ILOmination contingent in their illuminated costumes

The ILOmination is an additional Dinagyang tribes competition where warriors wear colorfully lit costumes. First added in 2023, it showcases seven competing tribes representing the seven districts of Iloilo City, namely the City Proper, Arevalo, Jaro, La Paz, Lapuz, Mandurriao, and Molo. It is a parade-type street dance competition that allows spectators to witness every performance from the tribes. In 2025, it was rebranded as the ILOmination Philippine Light Festival, showcasing various light festivals from across the Philippines.

The Floats Parade of Lights is also featured during the event, where gigantic and colorful floats of the sponsors for the Dinagyang Festival are going by the parade. It was first added in the 2018 edition during the 50th anniversary of the Dinagyang Festival.

The ILOmination and Parade of Lights primarily take place in the business districts of Mandurriao, moving through Atria Park District, SM City Iloilo, and Iloilo Business Park.

=== Ati Tribes Competition ===
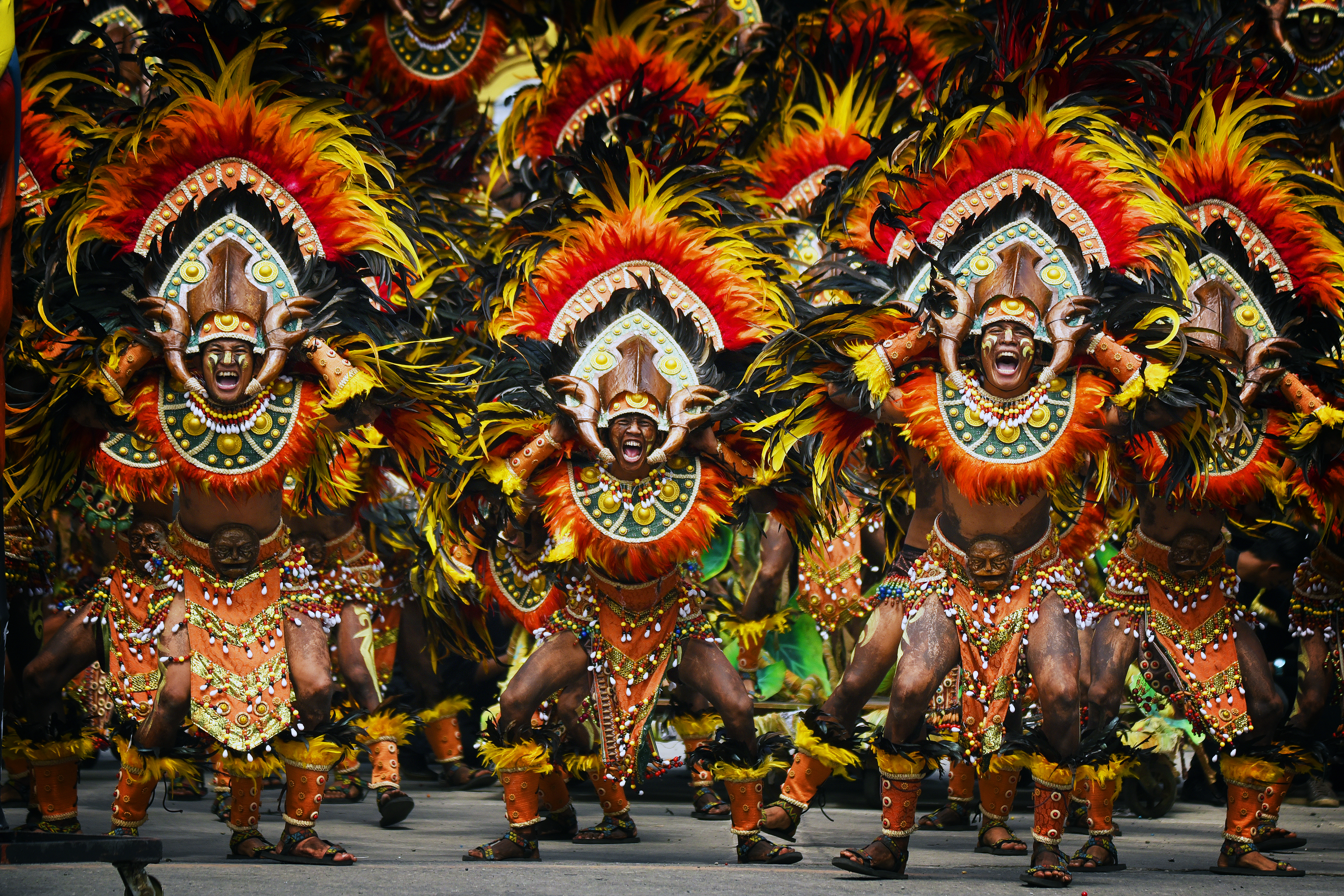
"Ati warriors" during the Ati Tribes Competition

The main highlight of the Dinagyang Festival is the Ati Tribes Competition, also known as the Dinagyang Tribes Competition. The event features "Ati warrior" dancers in elaborate costumes, typically including vibrant headdresses adorned with colorful fabrics, feathers, beads, and other embellishments. The performers dance in choreographed formations, intricate patterns, and chant in unison, all synchronized to the beats of loud drums and improvised percussion instruments created by each tribe (locally called tribu).

In the festival's early years, many tribes were formed and organized by barangays or communities around Iloilo City. However, as Dinagyang evolved and the competition gained worldwide fame and recognition, schools began organizing tribes. These school-based tribes introduced dynamic new dance patterns, formations, and choreography. To fund their participation, they solicited sponsorships from private companies to cover expenses.

No actual Ati people are involved in the competition, nor do they directly benefit from it. One of the requirements for participants is to paint their skin black and use indigenous-inspired materials for their costumes. All dances are performed to the rhythm of drum music. While many tribes are organized by local high schools, some tribes in recent years have come from distant provinces, including Batanes in Luzon and Cotabato in Mindanao.

The tribes receive subsidies from the Iloilo Festivals Foundation Inc. (IFFI) and the Iloilo City government, with private sponsors providing additional support. Tribes that perform exceptionally well often attract more sponsorships. The current Ati population in Iloilo does not actively participate in the competition or benefit from it. However, in recent years, the original Ati people from the hinterlands of Panay, particularly from the mountains of Barotac Nuevo and Anilao, have been invited to participate non-competitively. This aims to recognize their cultural significance and highlight their role as the symbolic inspiration for the festival.

The Ati Tribes Competition, along with the Kasadyahan Festival, is primarily held in the downtown area, with multiple stages set up on different streets, with the Iloilo Freedom Grandstand as the main stage. For the 2026 edition, the Iloilo Sports Complex was added as one of the main venues for the first time since 2012.

==== Grand Champions ====
The grand champion of the Ati Tribes Competition receives a trophy and a cash prize, and also gets a chance to perform at the year’s Philippine Independence Day rites in New York City. They will also represent Dinagyang in the annual Aliwan Fiesta held in the Star City Complex in Pasay, Metro Manila, where they will compete in the dance competition category against other winning groups from festivals across the country.

As of Dinagyang 2026, the reigning grand champion is Tribu Salognon of Jaro National High School.

== Legacy ==
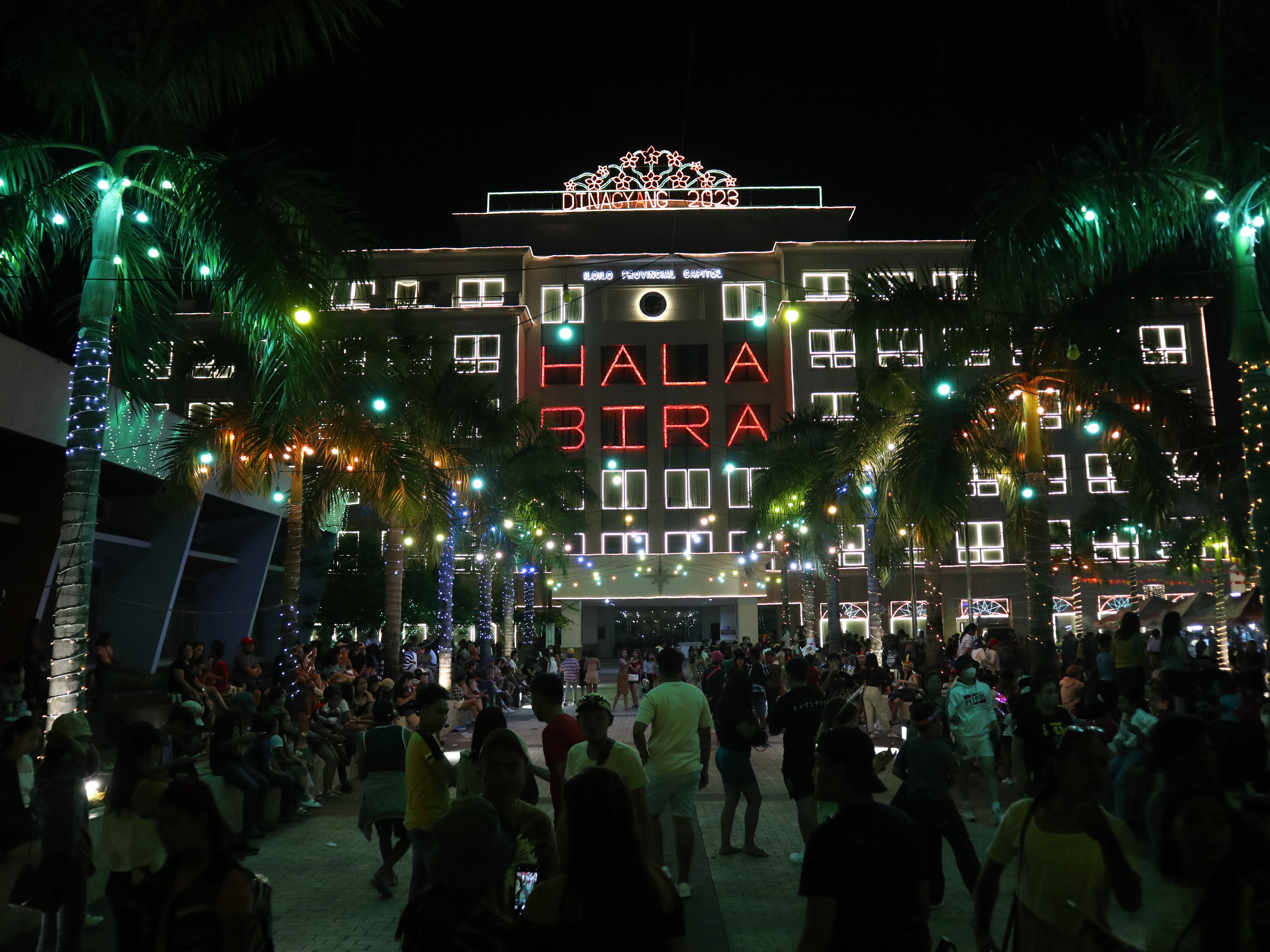
The Iloilo Provincial Capitol, featuring a 'Hala Bira' LED light display

Dinagyang is known for its innovations, awards, and its catchphrase, "Hala Bira, Iloilo! Viva Señor Santo Niño!" Hala bira is a Hiligaynon phrase meaning "dispense all means" and is widely used by Ilonggos to express enthusiastic participation in the festival. The phrase is frequently shouted during the celebration, popularized by the festival theme song, "Hala Bira, Iloilo!", which is played on every street throughout the city. The song, composed in the early 2000s by Rommel Salvador N. Chiu and award-winning musician and lyricist Dante M. Beriong, is recognized as one of the first festival theme songs in the Philippines.

=== Innovations ===
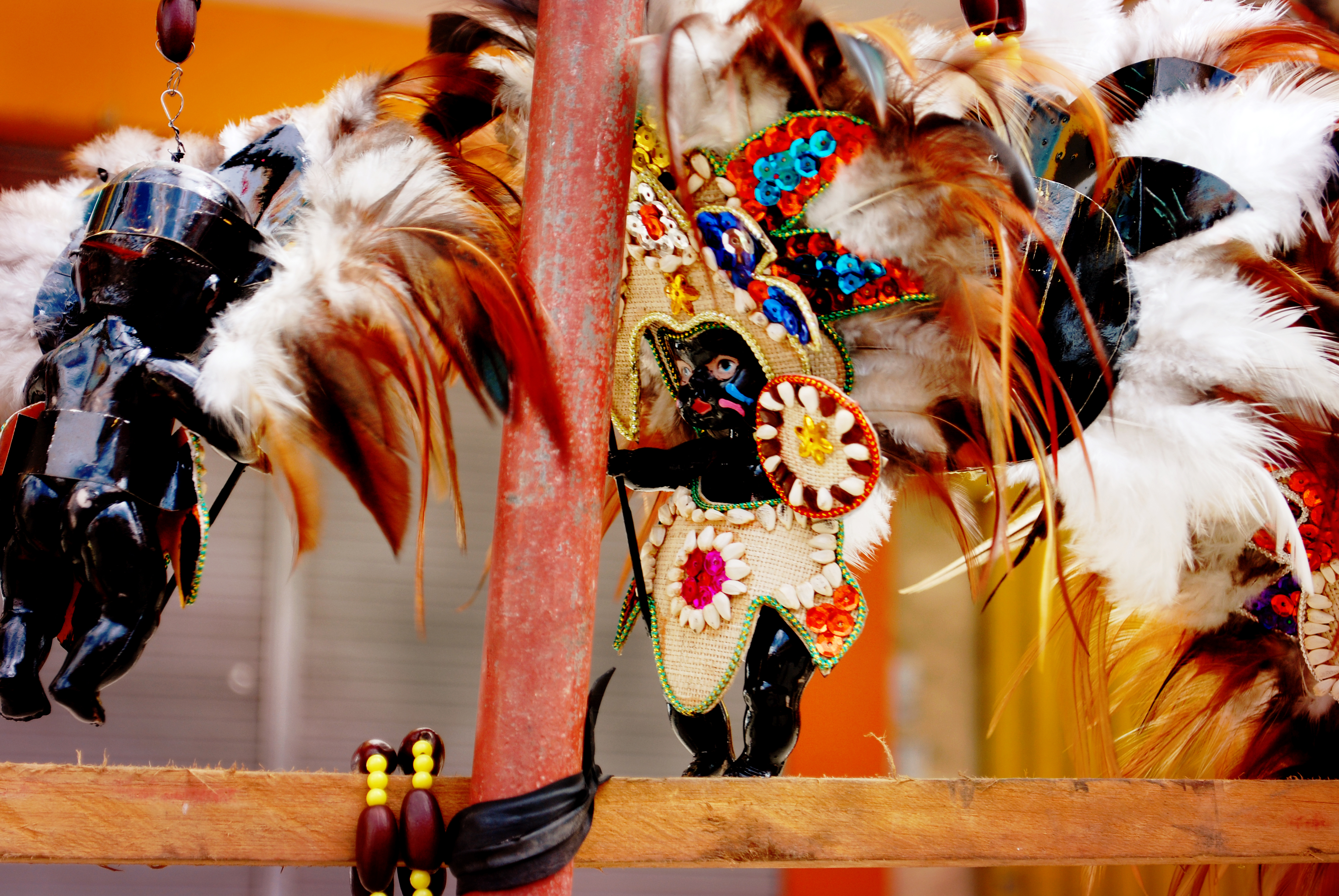
A Dinagyang souvenir trinket

Dinagyang festival has brought a lot of innovations throughout the years. These innovations have influenced the way other festivals in the country are run. Among these are the following:

- Carousel Performance - Dinagyang initiated the simultaneous performance of the competing tribes in different judging areas.
- Mobile Risers - Mobile risers is prominent feature of Dinagyang choreography today. It was introduced by Tribu Bola-bola in 1994. The risers have added depth and have improved the choreography of the dance movements.
- Dinagyang Pipes - First used by Tribu Ilonganon in 2005, the Dinagyang pipes are made of PVC pipes and are hammered by rubber paddles. Each pipe produces a distinct sound depending on the length and diameter of each pipe.
- Dagoy - The official mascot of the Dinagyang Festival and the first festival mascot in the Philippines. Born from promotional sketches for Dinagyang in 2002, the caricature was later adopted as the festival’s official logo. The public introduction took place on December 14, 2004, in The Fort, Taguig, and on December 18, 2004, in Iloilo City. Depicted as a young Ati warrior, Dagoy represents the joy and camaraderie of the Ilonggo people and the thousands to millions of tourists who attend the festival. Standing six feet and nine inches tall, the mascot features a dark brown complexion and wears a traditional Ati headdress with an image of Santo Niño. The attire includes a camel-colored loincloth, reflecting the traditional clothing of an Ati warrior. Dagoy holds a fiberglass drum with the logo of the Iloilo City Government at the center. The hands and feet are adorned with colorful bracelets, similar to those worn by Dinagyang warriors. Known for a winsome smile, Dagoy has become popular among children, with miniature versions marketed as "Dagoy Dolls."
Dinagyang tribe costumes in a variety of colors

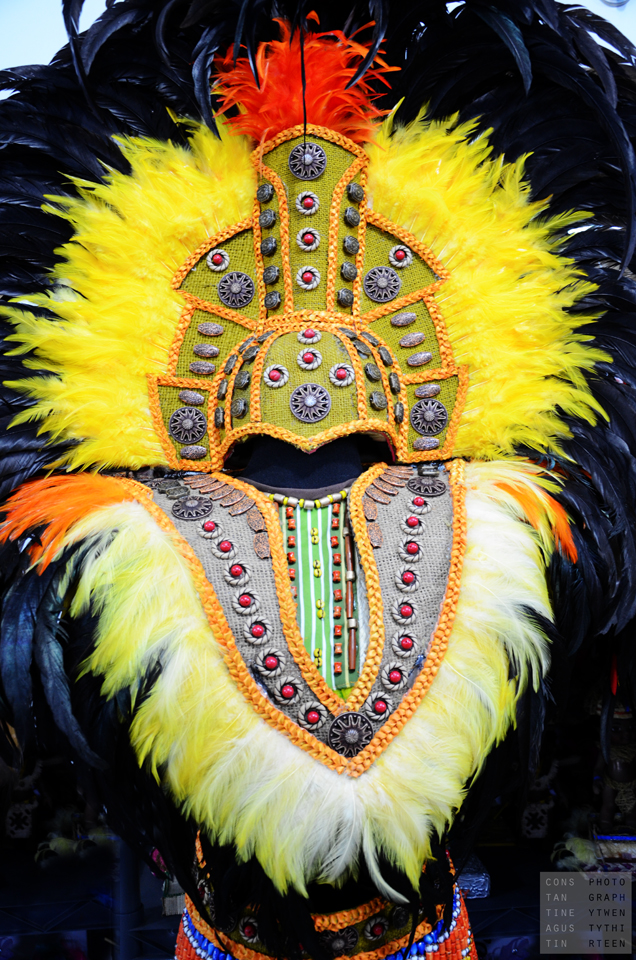

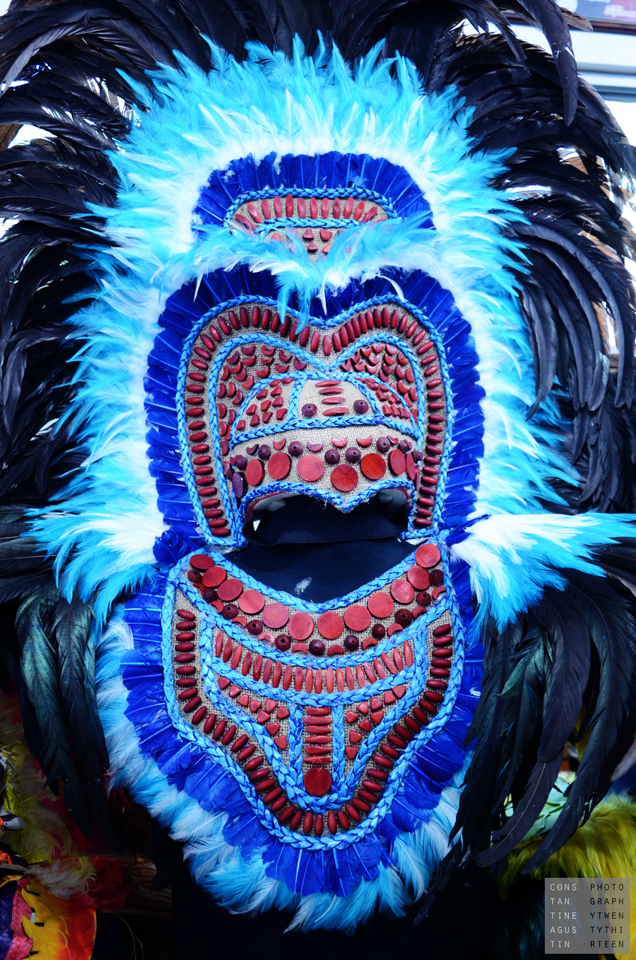

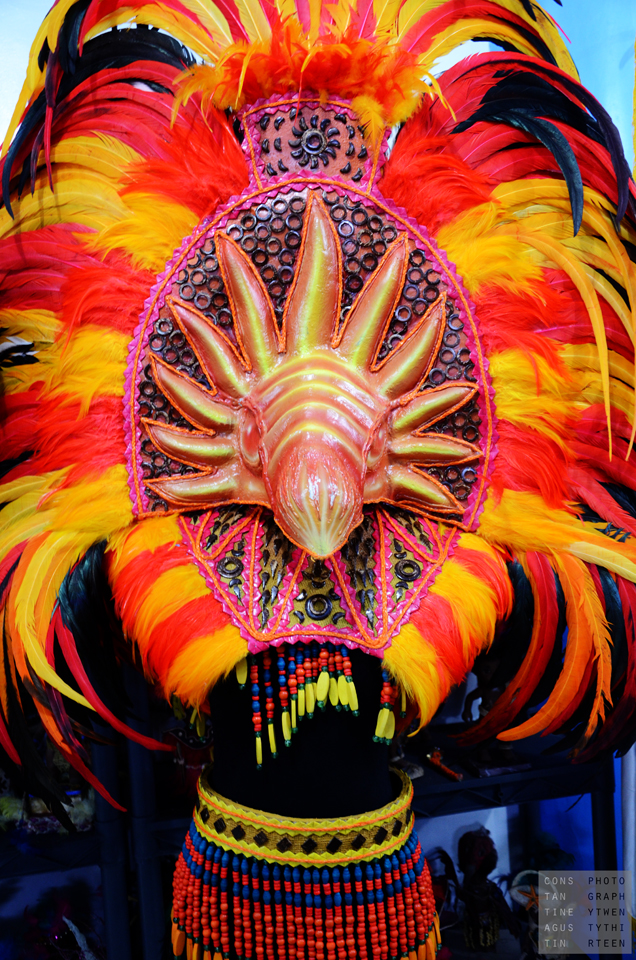

=== Recognitions and awards ===
Dinagyang is the most awarded festival in the Philippines. It has been recognized as the country's best tourism event by the Association of Tourism Officers in the Philippines (ATOP) for three consecutive years in 2006, 2007, and 2008. In 2020, it received another ATOP's Best Tourism Event Award (as Contemporary/Non-Traditional Expression Category). Its Dinagyang Digital edition in 2021 has also won as the Grand Winner of ATOP's Pearl Awards and Best Tourism Practice during the COVID-19 pandemic, which was the only award given by ATOP during that year. In 2022, it was declared as the grand winner of the Best Cultural Festival Award-City category. In the 2024 Philippine LEAF Awards, Dinagyang has been awarded as the Best Festival in the Visayas. Dinagyang was also the first ever Philippine recipient of the Asia-Pacific Folklore Festival award by the International Festivals and Events Association (IFEA). In 2025, it was awarded Best Overall Entertainment Program at the 2025 Pinnacle Awards Asia and Best Dynamic Festival (Dancing) at the Asia Festival Awards. It remains the only awardee from the Philippines for two consecutive years at the IFEA.

It is one of few festivals in the world to get the support of the United Nations for the promotion of the Millennium Development Goals, and cited by the Asian Development Bank as Best Practice on government, private sector & NGO cooperatives.

Dinagyang also holds the record for the most wins in Aliwan Fiesta, an annual "festival of festivals" competition showcasing diverse cultural festivals from across the Philippines. It bagged the titles in 2004, 2010, 2011, 2012, 2013, 2017, 2023 and 2024.

== See also ==
- Kasadyahan
- Ati-Atihan Festival
- Sinulog
