= Maragtas =

Illuminated manuscript by Pedro Alcantara Monteclaro

The Maragtas (English title: History of Panay from the first inhabitants and the Bornean immigrants, from which they descended, to the arrival of the Spaniards) is a 1907 work by Pedro Alcántara Monteclaro. Written in mixed Hiligaynon and Kinaray-a languages from Iloilo in the Philippines. An original composition based on written and oral sources available to Alcántara, the narrative has been the subject of debates as to its historicity.

== Content ==
The Maragtas is an original work which purports to be based on written and oral sources of which no copy has survived. The author makes no claim that the work contains a transcription of particular pre-colonial documents. The work consists of a publisher's introduction by Salvador Laguda, a foreword by the author, six chapters, and an epilogue.

The first chapter describes the former customs, clothes, dialect, heredity, organization, etc. of the aboriginal Ati on the island of Panay, with special mention of Chief Marikudo, son of the old Chief Polpulan. The second chapter contains the beginning of the narrative concerning ten Datus fleeing Borneo and the tyranny of Raja Makatunaw there. On arriving in Panay, the ten datus bartered with Marikudo for the plains and valleys of the island, offering gold in return. Datu Paiburong, in particular, was given the territory of Irong-Irong, now the province of Iloilo in the Philippines. The third chapter tells of the romance of Sumakwel, his wife Kapinangan, and her lover Gurung-garung, while the fourth chapter concludes the tale of the ten datus, including their political arrangements and their circumnavigation of the island. The fifth chapter describes the local language, commerce, clothing, customs, marriages, funerals, mourning habits, cockfighting, timekeeping techniques, calendars, and personal characteristics. The sixth and last chapter lists of Spanish officials between 1637 and 1808, while an epilogue contains some 18th-century dates.

== Historicity ==
Philippine historians made little use of the Maragtas before the Japanese occupation of the Philippines, with references such as that by Josué Soncuya in his 1917 Historia Pre-Hispánica de Filipinas having been restricted to the Spanish-speaking elite. In a book published in 1984, the historian William Henry Scott wrote in reference to an interesting research related to Maragtas. Scott said that in 1947, a book co-authored by historian H. Otley Beyer, founder of the Anthropology Department of the University of the Philippines, refers to Margitas and "the ancient writing in which it was originally inscribed. Scott quoted Beyer stating: A remarkable document known as 'Margitas', dating probably from about 1225, was preserved in Panay and transliterated into romanized Visayan in early Spanish days." The myth that the Maragtas was not an original work but rather a transcription of earlier works was later given wider circulation by various academics, as detailed by Scott. Scott concludes that the Maragtas was an original work by Pedro Alcántara Monteclaro.

Other Philippine historians held varying opinions, their research leading to theories of that some information in the Maragtas is verifiable in other sources.

In 2000, Filipino anthropologist F. Landa Jocano wrote a different account about Beyer’s findings. Jocano maintained that the manuscript that Beyer was referring to as "A remarkable document" was in fact the Maragtas, not the Margitas. According to Beyer, the original text of the Maragtas was written in old syllabary, although the document was preserved in Romanized Bisayan in the early Spanish period. Beyer claimed that the Maragtas written in original syllabary "was brought to Spain in the early 19th century by a Spanish colonel, but it can no longer be traced". On the other hand, the Beyer seemed also sure in his description of the text, and he described it as follows:

Another feature of the Panay manuscript, now called "Maragtas", is the ancient writing in which it was originally inscribed. The Bornean Visayans, used a form of syllabic writing, which they introduced wherever they spread. In this syllabary, the vowels were written only when they stood alone or at the beginning of words. Each consonant sign stood for the consonant followed by the sound of "a". The characters were incised on bamboo or written on bark with cuttlefish ink.

Early Spanish explorer Miguel de Loarca wrote in Relación de las Yslas Filipinas in June 1582, concerning what is now the district of Arévalo in Iloilo City:

... since these natives are not acquainted with the art of writing, they preserve their ancient lore through songs, which they sing in a very pleasing manner -commonly while plying their oars, as they are island-dwellers. Also, during their revelries, the singers who have good voices recite the exploits of olden times.

At the time, Loarca was unaware of any writing system used by natives of Panay, but later colonisers encountered a variety of native writing systems in use throughout the archipelago, including those in the Visayas. The Archives of the University of Santo Tomas contains the biggest cache of early colonial documents in Baybayin, used in Tagalophone parts of Luzon to the north.

Scott himself had no doubt regarding the historicity of an event that led to the transmission of an oral tradition that came to be known as the "Maragtas". He said in the revised version of his doctoral dissertation, published in 1984:

There is no reason to doubt that this legend preserves the memory of an actual event, but it is not possible to date the event itself or to decide which of its details are historic facts and which are the embellishment of generation of oral transmission.

Anthropologist Patricia P. Magos asserts,

...the identity of the Panay-Bukidnon culture can be reconstructed through these epics which serve as their link to the ancient past".

The text contains native language names of old settlements in Panay which were later hispanized, as well as lists of streams and river deltas where the Bornean settlers established villages and cultivated with seeds of plants they brought.

This oral epic of ancient Hiligaynons rebelling against Rajah Makatunao as written in the Maragtas have corroboration in Chinese records during the Song Dynasty when Chinese scholars recorded that the ruler during a February 1082 AD diplomatic meeting, was Seri Maharaja, and his descendant was Rajah Makatunaw and was together with Sang Aji (grandfather to Sultan Muhammad Shah). Historian Robert Nicholl implied that the Srivijayans of Sumatra, Vijayans of Vijayapura in Brunei and the Visayans in the Philippines were all related and connected to each other since they form one contiguous area.

The notion that the Maragtas is an original work of fiction by Monteclaro is disputed by the 2019 thesis, named "Mga Maragtas ng Panay: Comparative Analysis of Documents about the Bornean Settlement Tradition" by Talaguit Christian Jeo N. of De La Salle University who stated that, "Contrary to popular belief, the Monteclaro Maragtas is not a primary source of the legend but is rather more accurately a secondary source at best" as the Maragtas also appeared in the work of Rev. Fr. Tomás Santaren, Bisayan Accounts of Early Bornean Settlements. This was originally a section from the appendix of the book, Igorrotes: estudio geográfico y etnográfico sobre algunos distritos del norte de Luzon ("Igorots: a geographic and ethnographic study of certain districts of northern Luzon") by Fr. Ángel Pérez.

However, the written dates go earlier since Raja Makatunaw was recorded in the 1082 Chinese texts to have been as a descendant of Seri Maharaja. As an elaboration, the scholar J. Carrol points to a Sarawakian people in his article: "The Word Bisaya in the Philippines and Borneo" (1960) thinks there might be indirect evidence in the possible affinity between the Visayans and Melanaos as he speculates that Makatunao is similar to the ancient leader of the Melanao called "Tugao".

== In art ==
Despite controversy on the veracity of the Maragtas, it has inspired numerous local artists. Ricaredo Demetillo wrote Barter in Panay based on the narrative, which won the UP Golden Jubilee Award for Poetry in 1958. He later used it to develop the verse tragedy The Heart of Emptiness is Black, which won the Palanca Award in 1973, and was staged by the UP Repertory Company under director Behn Cervantes in June 1974.

Jeremías Elizalde Navarro from San José de Buenavista, Antique depicted a scene Maragtas in two versions of the mural Bulawan nga Saduk, one of which is in the lobby of the Antique Provincial Capitoll, and the other in the private collection of an insurance company. Demetillo’s work was later adapted by playwright Orlando Nadre as Kapinangan, a drama musical presented at the Manila Metropolitan Theater in 1981. It was directed by Cervantes, with music by National Artist for Music Ryan Cayabyab, and starred Kuh Ledesma as Kapinangan, Robert Arevalo as Datu Sumakwel, and Hajji Alejandro as Gurong-gurong.

A majority of notable writers from Panay, including Magdalena Jalandoni, National Artist for Literature Ramón Muzones, and Conrado Norada have reworked the tale into novels. From the Maragtas, Alex C. Delos Santos wrote the one-act play Pagtimalus ni Kapinangan (“Kapinangan's Revenge”), retelling Kapinangan's adulterous relationship from her perspective as a deliberate act stemming from being neglected by Sumakwel. The play was staged in 2002 at Saint Anthony's College in the trilogy Tres Mujeres presented at Iloilo National High School as part of the Duag Teatrokon Regional Theater Festival.

Rolando Tinio, José Lardizabal, and National Artist for Music Lucrecia Kasilag meanwhile produced Dulawaran: Ang Gintong Salakot in 1969 for the inauguration of the Cultural Center of the Philippines. Ballet Philippines also produced a version of Kapinangan with choreography and libretto by Eddie Elejar, and music by Lucrecia Kasilag staged at the Cultural Center of the Philippines. United States-based dancer and choreographer Dulce Capadocia also used the Kapinangan portion of the Maragtas in her multi-media dance epic, Ma'I Lost, which premiered in 1999 at the Luckman Fine Arts Complex, Los Angeles, California.

== See also ==
- Pedro Alcantara Monteclaro, Maragtas. Janiuay: 1854 (translated in English by Esther Abiera, et al., and currently in the Library of the University of Michigan).
- Early historic coastal city-states and polities of Philippines
- Pintados
- Indian cultural influences in early Philippine polities
- Greater India
- Indosphere
