= Infant Jesus School, Kalibo =

Infant Jesus School

Location
- Mabini Extension; Western Visayas (VI); Kalibo, Philippines, Aklan, 5600
- Coordinates: 11°42′10″N 122°21′53″E

Information
- Type: Private school
- Motto: Latin: Fides, Scientia, Vita (Faith, Knowledge, Life)
- Established: 1988
- School district: Kalibo
- Area trustee: Merle L. Altas
- Director: Jimmy Boy H. Estrellas
- Grades: K to 12
- Campus type: Urban
- Colors: Green and White
- Slogan: "The community that educates and cares..."
- Song: "Hail, hail Alma Mater"
- Yearbook: Vivre

Infant Jesus School (IJS) is a private semi-sectarian school established in 1988, the Department of Education, Culture and Sports recognized the Elementary department in 1993 and the High School department in 1999. The school also serves as the External Testing Center for admission to De La Salle University.

== See also ==
- List of schools in Kalibo, Aklan
