= Aklan Basketball Governor's Cup =

Aklan Basketball G-Cup
- League logo
- Sport: Basketball
- Founded: 1995
- No. of teams: 17
- Country: Philippines
- Most recent champion: Tangalan (1 Title)
- Most titles: Banga (5 titles)
- Broadcasters: TV: Kalibo Cable; Radio: GMA DYRU-Kalibo

Aklan Governor's Cup is an annual amateur basketball league which is usually dubbed under the name of the incumbent governor of Aklan. The league is one of the sports program of the province that aims to produce another basketball player that can play at the center stage of the Philippine Basketball Association. Wynne Arboleda, one of the superstars in the PBA, is a product of this program.

== Teams ==
Team	Moniker	Home stadium (Capacity)	Championship	Finals Appearance
Eastern Division
Altavas	Bulldogs	-	0	0
Balete	Lightning	Balete Covered Gym (400)	0	0
Banga	-	Banga Sports & Cultural Complex(1,000)	5	9
Batan	-	-	0	0
Kalibo	Kopiko(Corporate Sponsor)	ABL Sports & Cultural Complex (3,000)	1	1
Libacao	-	-	0	0
Madalag	-	-	0	0
New Washington	New Wave	New Washington Gym (400)	0	2
Western Division
Buruanga	-	-	0	0
Ibajay	-	Ibajay Sports Complex (1,000)	0	0
Lezo	Tierra Alta	Lezo Covered Court	0	0
Makato	-	ABL Sports Center (800)	0	0
Malay	-	-	0	0
Malinao	-	-	0	0
Nabas	-	-	0	0
Numancia	Builders	Bulwang Gymnasium(300)	4	8
Tangalan	-	Tangalan Gymnasium(400)	0	0

== Champions ==
Year	Champion	Runner-up	Most Valuable Player	Teams Participated
2009	Banga	Numancia	Ricky Ricafuente	-
2010	Numancia	Banga	Samuel Ignacio	(16) Makato, Tangalan, Lezo, Malinao, Ibajay, Nabas, Malay and Buruanga, Kalibo, New Washington, Batan, Altavas, Banga, Libacao, Balete and Madalag.
2011	Kalibo	Banga	JayMar Marte	(14) Lezo, Malinao, Malay, Ibajay, Tangalan, Nabas, Makato, Banga, Altavas, Balete, Madalag, Batan, Libacao and Kalibo.
2012	Ibajay	Tangalan	JR Manuel	(15) Kalibo, Banga, Altavas, New Washington, Balete, Madalag, Libacao, Batan, Numancia, Makato, Lezo, Malinao, Nabas, Ibajay and Tangalan.
2013	Tangalan	Ibajay	Arjay Postorioso	(12) Lezo, Malinao, Malay, Ibajay, Tangalan, Nabas, Makato, Balete, Madalag, Batan, Libacao and Kalibo.

Note: Records from 1995-2008 could not be retrieved.

== Tournament Format ==
Three teams with the best records from each group will advance to the quarterfinals following the single round elimination. The top two teams will enjoy the twice-to-beat advantage in the Final Four. The winners in the semifinals meet in the best-of-3 championship series.

== Notable players ==
- Wynne Arboleda (5'11" PG):The first Aklanon to play in the PBA. He is one of the veteran members of the Air21 Express.
- Ricky Ricafuente (5'11" PG): Played for Thailand Cobras of the Asean Basketball League and Trace Laguna Stallions of Liga Pilipinas.
- Joey Alacar (6'4" C): One of the dominant centers in the league. Played for Banga and Kalibo.
- Donald Delfin (6'4" C/PF): A former member of the St.Francis of Assisi College Doves of UCAA.
- Samuel Ignacio (6'4" C/PF): An MVP of the league and led Numancia to four(4) Championships.
- JayMar Marte (6'1" SF):
- Romeo Molo (6'1" F):
- JR Manuel (6'3" C): The 2012 League MVP.
- Rodney Sazon (6'5" C): A member of the FEU Tamaraws Team B.
