= List of schools in Kalibo, Aklan =

Schools in Kalibo, Aklan, Philippines as of January 7, 2025. (The list may not be complete)

Name	College	TechVoc	High School	Elementary	Pre-School	Location
AMA Computer College - Kalibo		✔				M.Laserna Street
Aklan Catholic College	✔	✔	✔	✔	✔	Arch.Reyes Street (Main Campus); Roxas Avenue Extension (Andagao Campus)
Aklan Polytechnic College	✔	✔				Jaime Cardinal Sin Avenue (Main Campus)
Aklan State University (Kalibo Campus)	✔	✔				Roxas Avenue Extension, Andagao
Central Panay College of Science and Technology		✔	✔	✔	✔	Osmena Avenue, Estancia
Garcia College of Technology	✔	✔	✔			Osmena Avenue, Estancia
JAVTES College		✔	✔			Arch. Reyes Street
Kalibo Integrated Special Education Center			✔	✔	✔	XIX Martyrs Street
New OFW Vocational and Technical School		✔				Roxas Avenue
Northwestern Visayan Colleges	✔	✔	✔	✔	✔	Capitol Site, R. Quimpo Avenue
Panay Technological College	✔	✔	✔			M. Laserna Street
PGA-ASU School of Nursing	✔					DRSTMH Compound, Mabini Street
Saint Gabriel College	✔	✔	✔	✔		Provincial Road, Old Buswang
STI College of Kalibo	✔	✔				Capitol Site, R. Quimpo Avenue
Verde Grande College	✔	✔				Bayanihan Road, Pook
Western Pacific College				✔	✔	Osmena Avenue, Tigayon
Christ the King School			✔	✔	✔	Toting Reyes Street, New Buswang
Infant Jesus Academy			✔	✔	✔	Jaime Cardinal Sin Avenue, Andagao
Infant Jesus School (La Salle Assisted)			✔	✔	✔	Mabini Extension
Marian High			✔	✔	✔	Mercedes Village, New Buswang
Saint Anne Montessori School			✔	✔	✔	Park Homes 1, Andagao
Starglow Center for Academics and Arts			✔	✔	✔	Old Buswang
Wadeford School (PAREF Assisted)			✔	✔	✔	Provincial Road, Andagao
Aklan Academy			✔			C. Laserna Street
Aklan National High School for Arts and Trades			✔			ASU Compound, Andagao
Aklan Valley High School			✔			ALC Compound, Andagao
Dela Cruz Institute of Business and Industry			✔			D. Maagma Street
Kalibo Institute			✔			Mabini Street
Linabuan National High School			✔			Osmena Avenue, Linabuan Norte
Nalook National High School			✔			Provincial Road, Nalook
Regional Science High School for Region VI (RSHS-VI)			✔			Provincial Road, Old Buswang
Aklan Inter Faith Academy				✔	✔	Jaime Cardinal Sin Avenue, Estancia
Aklan Learning Center				✔	✔	Roxas Avenue Extension, Andagao
Holy Child Nursery and Kindergarten School					✔	M. Laserna Street
Kalibo Sun Yat Sen School				✔	✔	Pastrana Street
Maranatha Christian Academy				✔	✔	Osmena Avenue, Estancia
Saint Dominic School of Kalibo				✔	✔	DBP Avenue Capitol Site
Saint Gabriel English School				✔	✔	C. Laserna Street
Three Angels Adventist Learning Center				✔	✔	D. Maagma Street
Public Elementary Schools
Andagao Elementary School				✔		
Bakhaw-Old Buswang Elementary School				✔		
Caano Elementary School				✔		
Estancia Elementary School				✔		
General F. Castillo Memorial School of Mabilo				✔		
Kalibo Elementary School				✔		
Kalibo Pilot Elementary School				✔		
Linabuan Elementary School				✔		
Mobo Elementary School				✔		
Nalook Elementary School				✔		
New Buswang Elementary School				✔		
Pook Elementary School				✔		
Tinigao Elementary School				✔		
