= Aklan Polytechnic College =

Private college in Aklan, Philippines

- Former name: Aklan Polytechnic Institute (1987-2007)
- Type: Private
- Established: 1986
- Vice-president: Jonathan P. Gallito
- Location: Quezon Avenue, Kalibo, Aklan, Philippines; 11°35′48.54″N 122°45′18.55″E
- Campus: Urban
- Location in the Visayas Location in the Philippines

Aklan Polytechnic College is a private educational institution in Kalibo, Aklan, Philippines. It was established primarily as a maritime school but at present it already offers nursing, business, and other courses. It began offering tourism management course in 2014-2015.

== School names ==
1. 1987-2007: Aklan Polytechnic Institute
2. 2007–Present: Aklan Polytechnic College

== Departments ==
- Secondary/High School
- Tertiary/College
  - BS in Business Administration
  - BS in Computer Engineering
  - BS in Computer Science
  - BS in Customs Administration
  - BS in Marine Engineering
  - BS in Marine Transportation
  - BS in Nursing

The college was able to produce numerous topnotchers in their various courses, Mr. Arren Mado (Top 8) Nurse Licensure Examination November 2015, Capt. Rommel Sison (Top 1) Master Mariner Examination, Capt. Godofredo Mortel, to name the few. In 2008, the college of Nursing was recognized by the Commission on Higher Education (CHED) as one of the top performing nursing school in the Philippines by the number of passing percentage in the Nurse Licensure Examination.

The College of Nursing is considered as one of the toughest course in the college because of the standards set and implemented. The passing grade for every subject is 81 and the student has to maintain this in order to stay in the college until they graduate. Presently, the Dean of the College is Mrs. Elvie Abello Imason-Ramos, MN, MAN, RN and most of its faculty are master's degree holder in Nursing and some are licensed teacher.

== Campus ==
- Main - Quezon Avenue, Kalibo, Aklan
- Tambak Campus - Tambak, New Washington, Aklan

== See also ==
- List of schools in Kalibo
