= PGA-ASU School of Nursing =

Public college in Aklan, Philippines

- Type: Public college
- Established: 2005
- Affiliations: Provincial Government of Aklan, Aklan State University
- Dean: Sheila Mercurio
- Location: Kalibo, Aklan, Philippines; 11°42′16″N 122°21′56″E
- Campus: Urban
- Website: School of Arts and Sciences Webpage
- Location in the Visayas Location in the Philippines

The PGA-ASU School of Nursing is a collaboration between Aklan State University and the Provincial Government of Aklan. It was envisioned to provide affordable Nursing education to the people of Aklan by then Governor Carlito Marquez.

== See also ==
- List of schools in Kalibo, Aklan
