= Kalibo Integrated Special Education Center =

- Integral na Sentro ng Espesyal na Edukasyon ng Kalibo
- Poblacion Kalibo; Western Visayas; Kalibo, Aklan; Philippines

Information
- School type: Integrated public school
- Established: 1999
- Founder: Remia H. Donguines
- School district: Kalibo II
- School number: 114757
- Principal: Wilma Werigene M. Villa
- Grades: Kinder to grade 12
- Colors: Blue and green
- Nickname: KISEC, KES II
- Publication: The Wit's Pen (English elementary)
- Affiliations: Department of Education - Division of Aklan; Regional Science High School Union

The Kalibo Integrated Special Education Center, formerly Kalibo Elementary School II (KES II) / Kalibo Elementary School II (Aklan Special Education Center), is a public integrated school in Kalibo supervised by the Department of Education. It is located in XIX Martyrs Street, Poblacion, Kalibo, Aklan, Philippines.

== History ==
In 1999, the then Aklan Schools Division Superintendent Dr. Reynalda I. Magdaluyo, authorized the splitting of Kalibo Elementary School into two schools namely: Kalibo Elementary School I (KES I) and Kalibo Elementary School II (KES II). Remia H. Donguines, the school's founder, was appointed as the first principal of the newly instituted KES II. KES II opened the school year in June 1999 with two regular classes/sections for each level from Kinder to Grade 6 and a Special Education (SpEd) class for visually impaired pupils. The SpEd class for visually impaired pupils was pioneered by Johann C. Cawaling. The school produced 101 elementary graduates in its first school year of operations.

Subsequently, the school's SpEd curriculum expanded rapidly. From one class for visually impaired students, SpEd classes were also opened for the gifted and talented, hearing impaired, intellectually disabled, etc. The school became the only one in the entire province of Aklan that caters to children with special needs such as visually impaired, hearing impaired and intellectually disabled. With this, the school's name was expanded to Kalibo Elementary School II (Aklan Special Education Center) to highlight it's being the center of special education in the entire province. Meanwhile, its regular classes have continued producing graduates who have excelled in their secondary.

By 2009, the school's 10th year, the school had produced 20 SpEd graduates who were eligible to enrol in high school. However, there is a lack of secondary education institutions in the province that can accommodate them. This prompted the General Parents, Teachers and Community Association (PTCA) of KES II (Aklan Special Education Center) to initiate the groundwork for the conversion of the institution from an elementary school into an integrated school by passing a resolution. The Sangguniang Barangay of Poblacion Kalibo and the Sangguniang Bayan of Kalibo endorsed a similar resolution supporting the move

Finally, on July 26, 2011, Dr. Mildred L. Garay, Regional Director of the Department of Education, Region 6 acting for the Secretary of Education issued Government Recognition (RO VI) No. I-001 s. 2011 that recognizes the school as a “Public Integrated School” and the change in name to Kalibo Integrated Special Education Center (KISEC), effective April 29, 2009.

Brigada Eskwela is a nationwide volunteer and community service program which started in 2003 and engages the stakeholders and hundreds of volunteers for cleaning, refitting, and rebuilding classrooms.

KISEC has come a long way. It has expanded to three departments namely: Elementary, Secondary (High School) and Special Education. KISEC has also positioned itself as the center of special education in the capital town of Kalibo and in the Province of Aklan while continuously producing graduates who have become successful professionals, board topnotchers, world-class athletes, artists, performers and contributing citizens of the country from its regular classes.

KISEC is supervised by the Department of Education under the District of Kalibo II, Division of Aklan, Region VI - Western Visayas. Wilma Werigene M. Villa, Principal II, one of the pioneer teachers of the school is now the school principal.

=== Faculty and administration ===
From its establishment, the institution had its founder Remia H. Donguines as its principal, until her retirement. She was replaced by the current principal Wilma Werigene M. Villa, one of the pioneer teachers of the institution.

== Academics ==
=== Curriculum ===
The school is following the new curriculum by the Department of Education, the Enhanced K to 12 Curriculum, as of the school year 2012–2013.

=== Publications ===
- The Wit's Pen - official elementary publication

=== Athletics ===
- KISEC is the school of 2017 ASEAN Para-swimming bronze medalist Claire Calizo.
