= Garcia College of Technology =

Private college in Aklan, Philippines

- Motto: "is committed to affordable and accessible quality education"
- Type: Private College
- Established: 1968; 58 years ago
- Affiliations: PRISAA PAPSCU
- President: Dr. Arnulfo Q. Distor, Jr.
- Vice-president: Violeta Q. Distor
- Location: M9R8+XG9, National Highway, Kalibo, Aklan, 5600, Philippines; 11°35′48.54″N 122°45′18.55″E
- Website: gct.edu.ph
- Location in the Visayas Location in the Philippines

Garcia College of Technology, also referred to as GCT, is the premier business and engineering school in Kalibo, Aklan. It was founded in 1968 by the late Don Florencio M. Garcia and Doña Enrica Reyes Garcia.

== Courses offered ==
Garcia College of Technology
Courses	Major	Years
Administration
BS Office Administration	n/a	4
Business
BS Accountancy		4
BS Business Administration	Financial Management; Human Resource Development Management; Marketing Management; Operations Management	4
Engineering
BS Civil Engineering	n/a	4
BS Electrical Engineering	n/a	4
BS Mechanical Engineering		4
IT, Computer Sciences and Programming
BS Computer Science	n/a	4
BS Information Technology	n/a	4
Associate in Computer Technology	n/a	2
Tourism, Hospitality & Culinary
BS Hotel Restaurant Management	n/a	4

== See also ==
- List of schools in Kalibo
