= Penitent Sisters of Our Lady of Fatima =

Contemplative Roman Catholic religious order

The Congregation of the Penitent Sisters of Our Lady of Fatima is a contemplative Roman Catholic religious order founded in 1959 Bro. Francisco Tolentino F.T., a hermit, at Rosario, Malinao, Aklan, the Philippines. The nuns are discalced, and live as penitents. Manual labor is done by the nuns.
