= Aklan =

Aklan Akean (Aklanon)
- Province
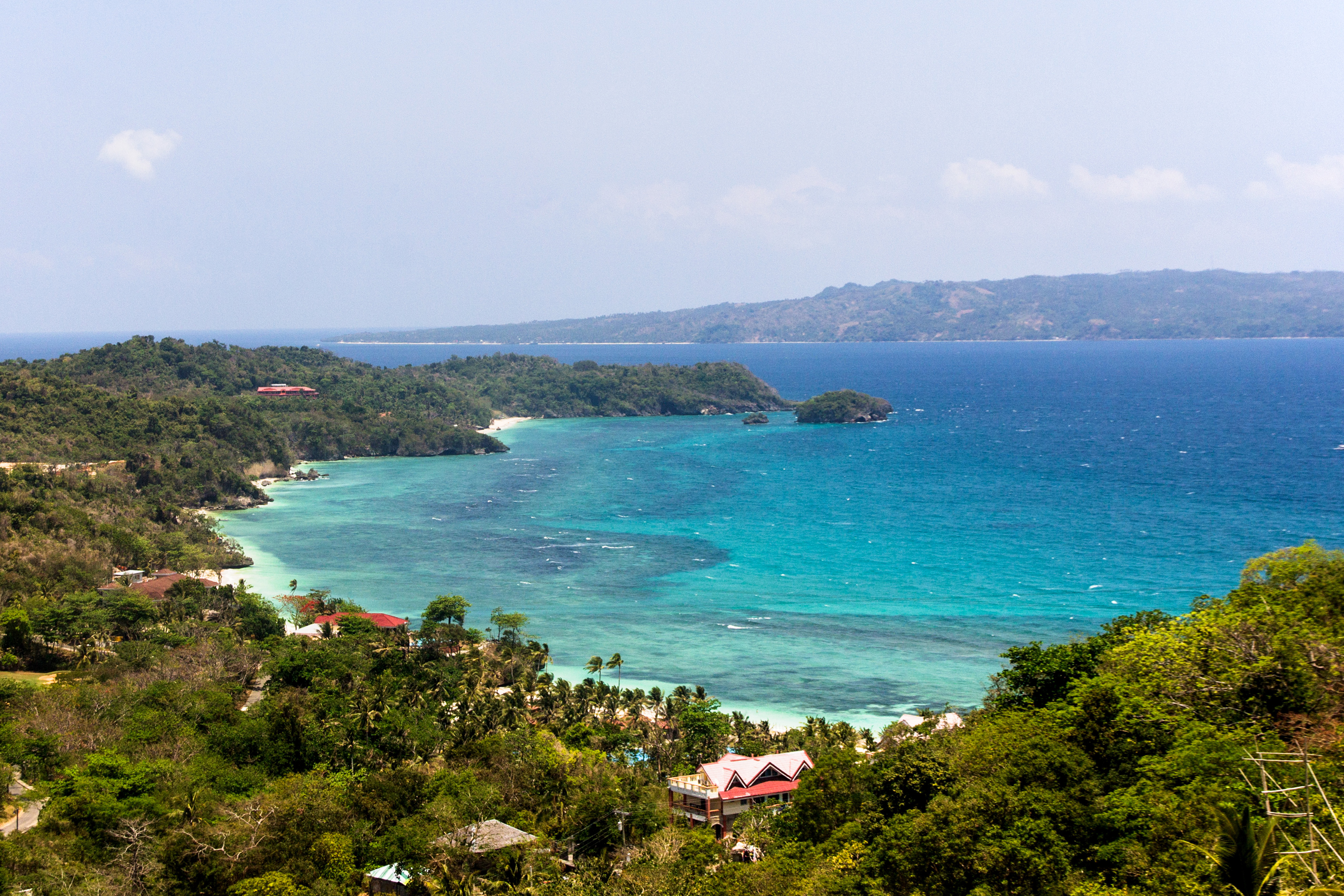
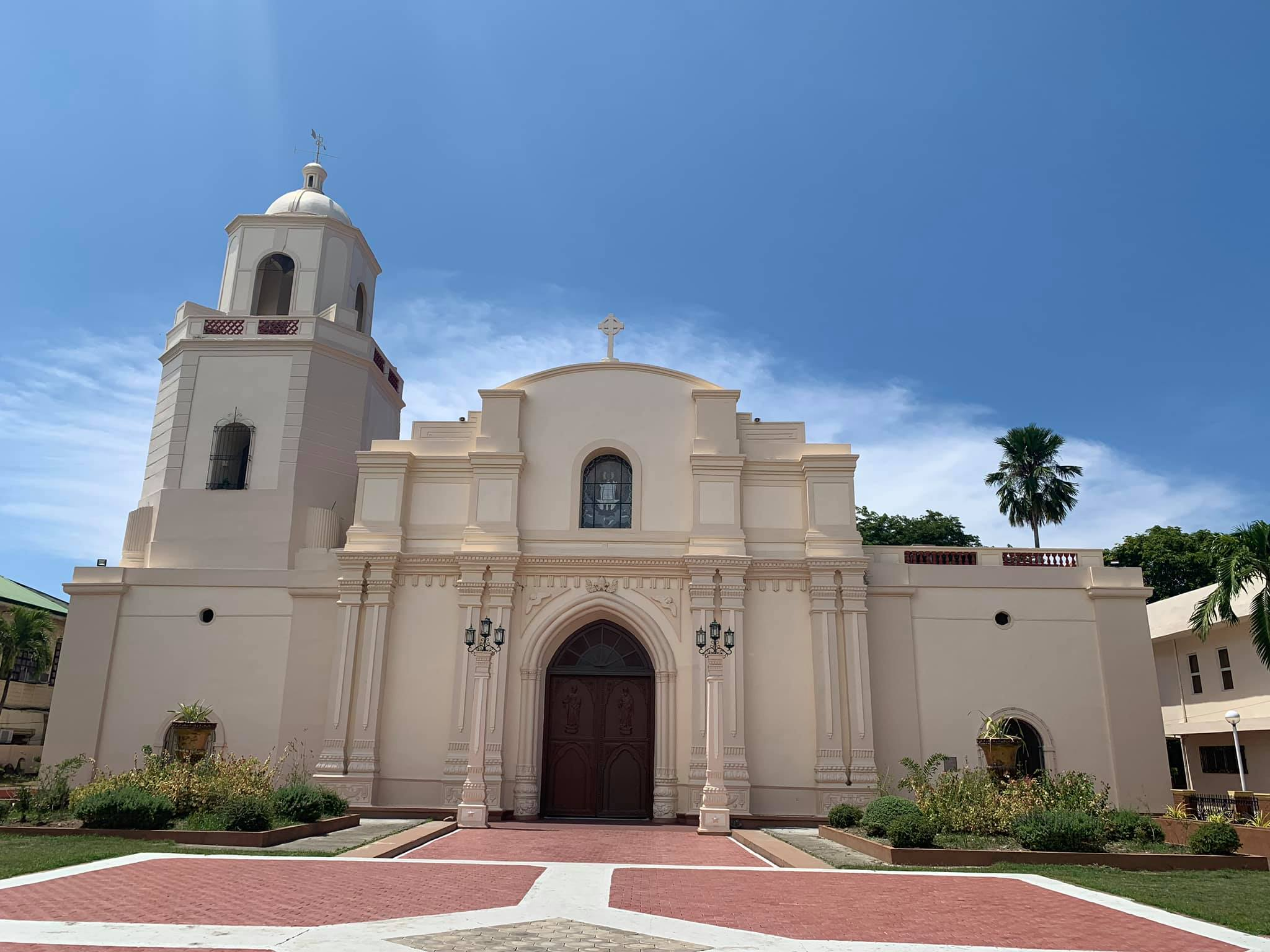
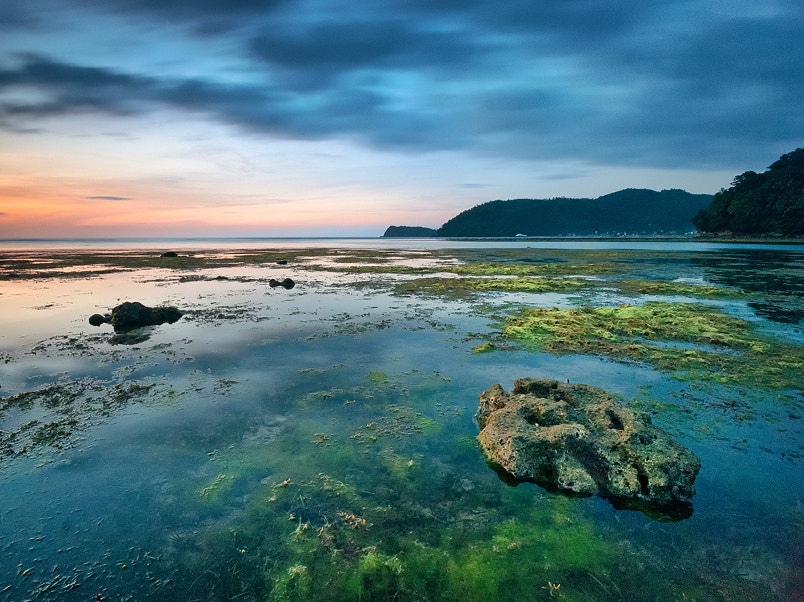
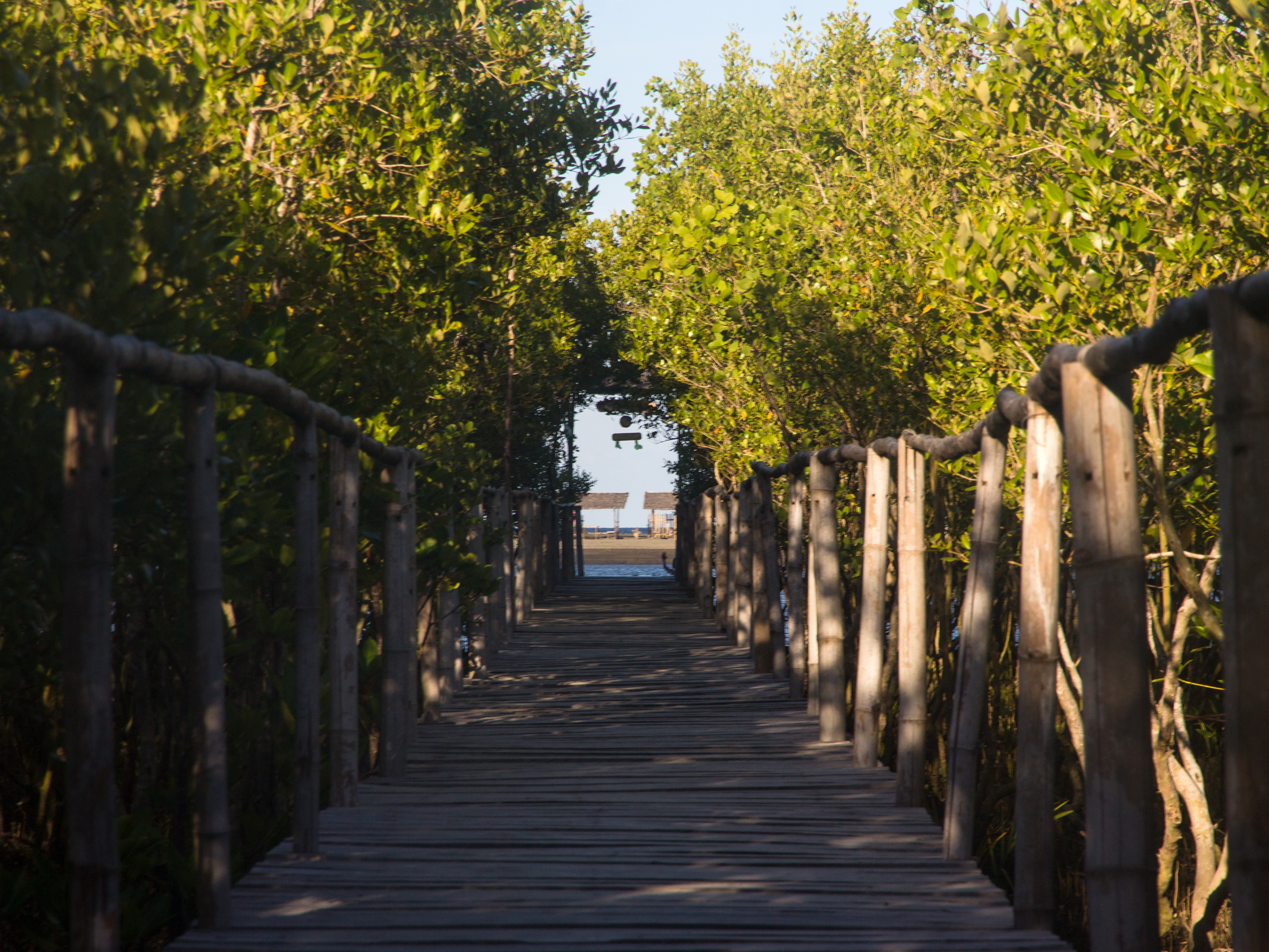
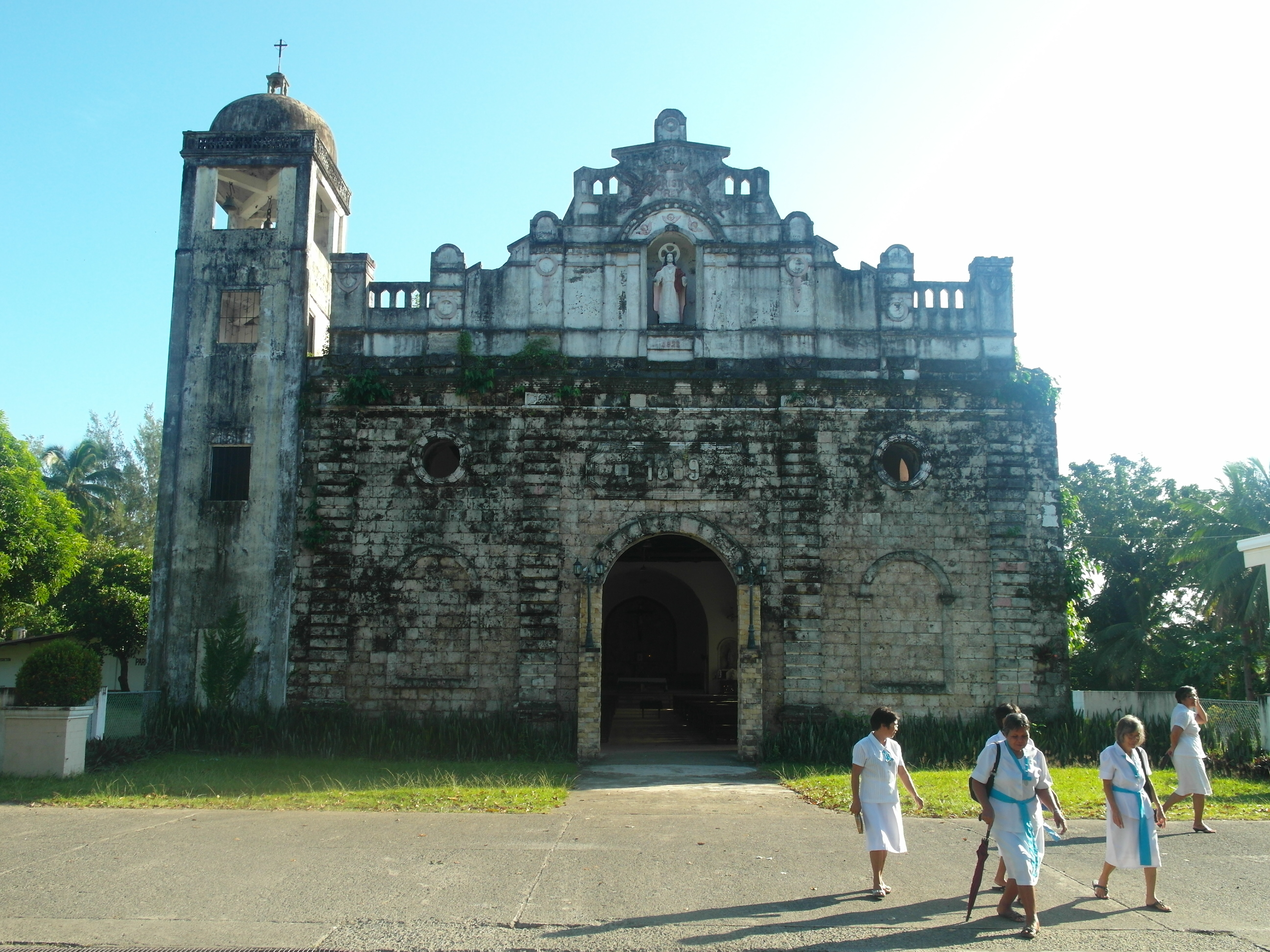
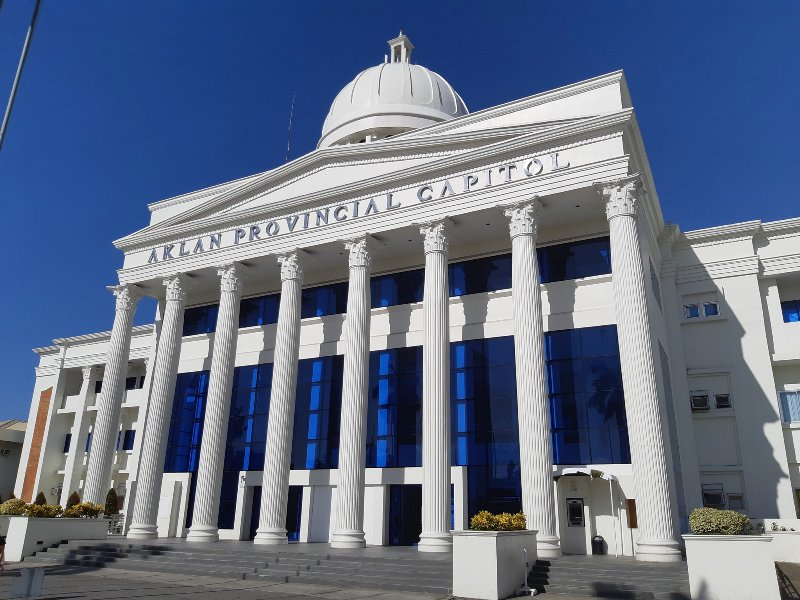
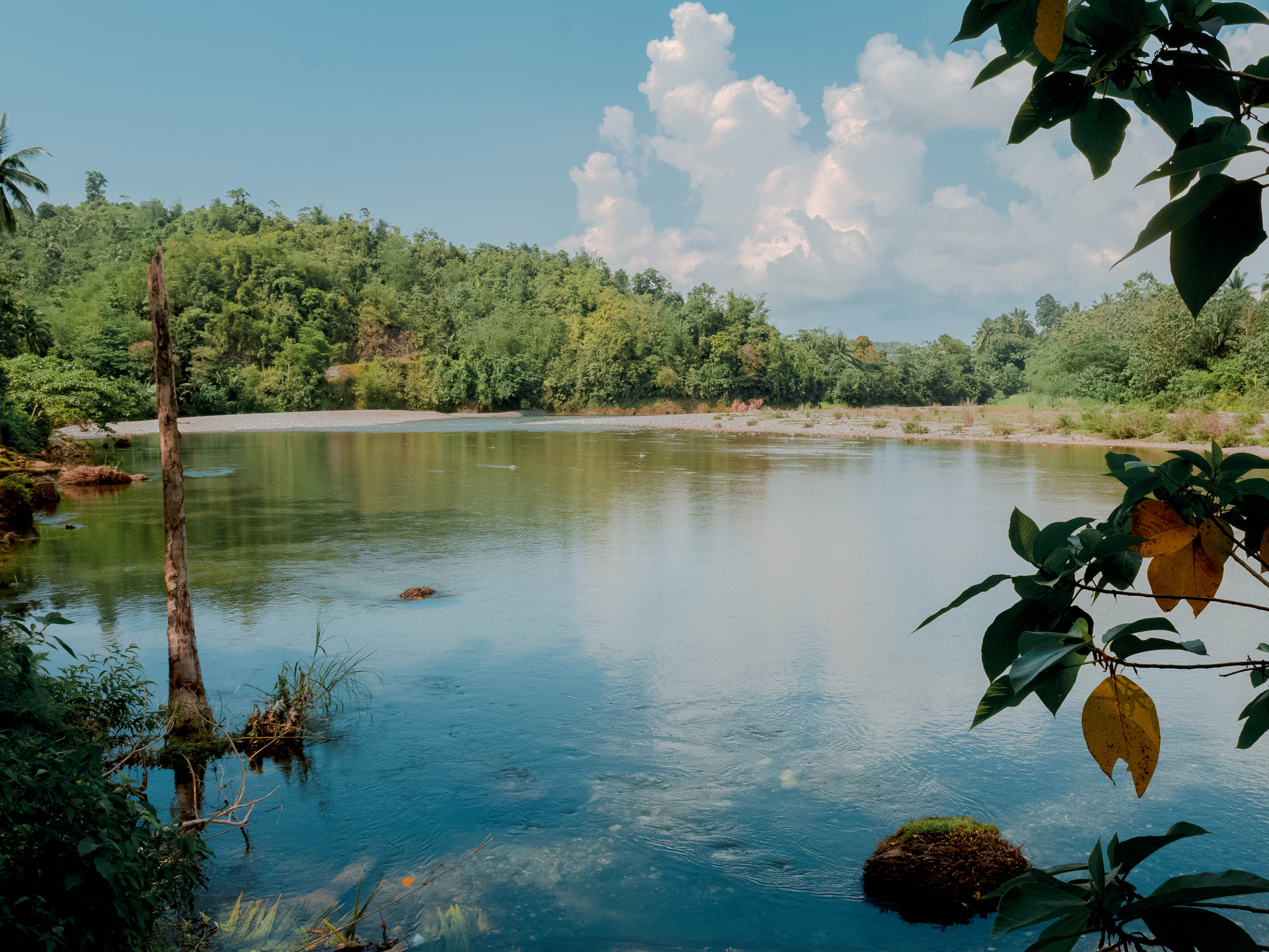
- (from top: left to right) Boracay, Kalibo Cathedral, Buruanga, Bakhawan Eco-Park, Tangalan Church, Aklan Provincial Capitol, and Aklan River

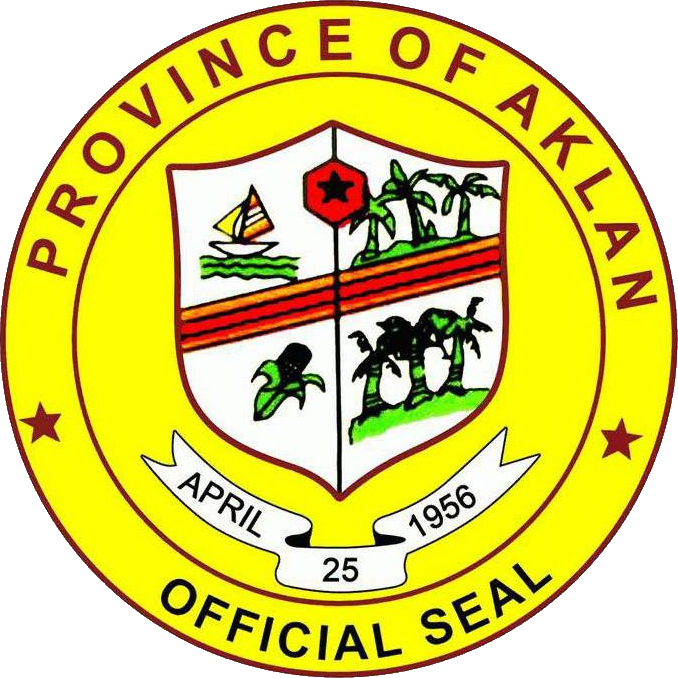
- Flag Seal
- Motto: "Arangkada, Aklan"
- Anthem: "Aklan Hymn"
- Location in the Philippines
- Interactive map of Aklan
- Coordinates: 11°40′N 122°20′E
- Country: Philippines
- Region: Western Visayas
- First settled: 13th century
- Founded: 25 April 1956
- Capital and largest municipality: Kalibo

Government
  - Governor: Jose Enrique M. Miraflores (Lakas)
  - Vice Governor: Dexter M. Calizo (Lakas)
  - Legislature: Aklan Provincial Board
  - Electorate: 414,890 voters (2025)

Area
  - Total: 1,821.42 km^{2} (703.25 sq mi)
  - Rank: 64th out of 82
- Highest elevation (Mount Timbaban): 1,777 m (5,830 ft)

Population (2024 census)
  - Total: 634,422
  - Rank: 51st out of 82
  - Density: 348.312/km^{2} (902.123/sq mi)
  - Rank: 23rd out of 82
  - Households: 151,381
- Demonym: Aklanon

Divisions
  - Independent cities: 0
  - Component cities: 0
  - Municipalities: 17: Altavas; Balete; Banga; Batan; Buruanga; Ibajay; Kalibo; Lezo; Libacao; Madalag; Makato; Malay; Malinao; Nabas; New Washington; Numancia; Tangalan
  - Barangays: 327
  - Districts: Legislative districts of Aklan

Economy
  - Income class: 1st provincial income class
  - Poverty incidence: 3.1% (2023)
  - Revenue: ₱ 2,533 million (2024)
  - Assets: ₱ 10,314 million (2024)
  - Expenditure: ₱ 1,180 million (2024)
  - Liabilities: ₱ 3,287 million (2024)
  - HDI: ▲0.660 (Medium)
  - HDI rank: 29th in Philippines (2019)
  - GDP: ₱63.57 billion $1.084 billion
- Time zone: UTC+8 (PHT)
- PSGC: 060400000
- IDD : area code: +63 (0)36
- ISO 3166 code: PH-AKL
- Spoken languages: Aklanon; Hiligaynon; Ati; Kinaray-a; Onhan; Capiznon; Filipino; English
- Website: aklan.gov.ph

Aklan, officially the Province of Aklan, (Note: Aklan: Probinsya it Akean [akˈɤan]; Hiligaynon: Kapuoran sang Aklan; Tagalog: Lalawigan ng Aklan) is a province in the Western Visayas region of the Philippines. Its capital and largest town is Kalibo. The province is situated in the northwest portion of Panay Island, bordering Antique to the southwest, and Capiz to the southeast. Aklan faces the Sibuyan Sea and Romblon province to the north.

Aklan is most well-known for Boracay, a resort island 0.8 kilometers north of the tip of Panay. It is known for its white sand beaches and is considered one of the more prominent destinations in the country. The Ati-Atihan Festival of Kalibo has also been known worldwide, hence declared "The Mother of all Philippine Festivals." It is an annual celebration held on the third Sunday of January to honor the Santo Niño (Infant Jesus). The festival showcases tribal dancing through the town's main streets to the tune of ethnic music, with participants in indigenous costumes and gear.

== History ==
=== Early history ===
Aklan is believed to have been settled in ancient times by settlers from Borneo, ruled by Datu Bangkaya, with his seat at Madyanos, near present-day Numancia.

=== Spanish colonial era ===
Several datus succeeded Datu Manduyog until the Spanish explorer Miguel López de Legazpi landed in Batan in 1565 and claimed the island for Spain, in early Spanish accounts it was called El Río de Aclán. According to an 1818 census, Aklan which was still in political union with the province of Capiz had municipalities with large amounts of Spanish-Filipino families, of which Batan had 56, Banga had 8, Malinao had 11, Kalibo had 167, and Ibajay 30.

=== Japanese occupation ===
In 1942, the Japanese invaded Aklan during World War II. In 1945, combined Filipino and American army along with Aklanon guerrillas liberated Aklan during the war in the Pacific.

=== Postwar Era ===
Aklan (Akean) became an independent province through Republic Act No. 1414 signed by Philippine President Ramon Magsaysay on April 25, 1956, separating Aklan from Capiz. The original towns were Altavas, Balete, Batan, Banga, Buruanga, Ibajay, Kalibo, Lezo, Libacao, Madalag, Malay, Makato, Malinao, Nabas, New Washington, Numancia, and Tangalan, then all part of the province of Capiz. The province was inaugurated on November 8, 1956. Jose Raz Menez was appointed the first governor of Aklan by President Magsaysay and he served until December 30, 1959.

In 1960, Godofredo P. Ramos became the first elected governor but upon resigning to run for Congress he was succeeded by the vice governor, Virgilio S. Patricio. In 1964, José B. Legaspi succeeded Patricio and he held office for two consecutive terms from 1964 to 1971.

=== Martial law era ===
The beginning months of the 1970s had marked a period of turmoil and change in the Philippines, as well as in Aklan. During his bid to be the first Philippine president to be re-elected for a second term, Ferdinand Marcos launched an unprecedented number of foreign debt-funded public works projects. This caused the Philippine economy to take a sudden downwards turn known as the 1969 Philippine balance of payments crisis, which led to a period of economic difficulty and a significant rise of social unrest. With only a year left in his last constitutionally allowed term as president, Ferdinand Marcos placed the Philippines under Martial Law in September 1972 and thus retained the position for fourteen more years. This period in Philippine history is remembered for the Marcos administration's record of human rights abuses, particularly targeting political opponents, student activists, journalists, religious workers, farmers, and others who fought against the Marcos dictatorship. Aklanons discovered that they could be arrested for even mundane things like being caught possessing a cassette tape of nationalistic songs.

With no way to express their grievances about government abuses after the declaration of Martial law in 1972, many students felt they had no option but to join the underground resistance movement against the dicttorship. Among the most prominent of them were underground movement leaders Antonio "Tonyhil" Hilario, Rolly Lorca, and Antonio Tagamolia, who were killed in a raid in Libacao in February 1974; as well as student journalist Antonio "Diore" Mijares and Baptist Youth organizer Edward Dela Fuente, who were caught, tortured, and killed somewhere in Ibajay on Good Friday, April 20, 1984. Some of these figures were later honored by having their names inscribed in the Philippines' Bantayog ng mga Bayani memorial which honors the martyrs and heroes who fought the authoritarian regime.

==== Dispossession of Boracay from the Ati ====
On Nov. 10, 1978, six years after the declaration of Martial Law under Ferdinand Marcos, 65 Philippine islands including Boracay was declared "tourist zones and marine reserves" without any mention of the status of the Ati who were the original residents of the island. This de facto dispossession of Ati lands on Boracay by Marcos placed the islands under the control of the Philippine Tourism Authority, and marked the beginning of rapid development on the island. In turn, this resulted in the further marginalization of the Boracay Ati for decades.

=== Contemporary history ===
Aklan was among the provinces affected by the COVID-19 pandemic in the Philippines, with an overseas Filipino worker who showed symptoms on March 12, 2020 becoming the first "person under investigation" (PUI) in the province.

== Geography ==
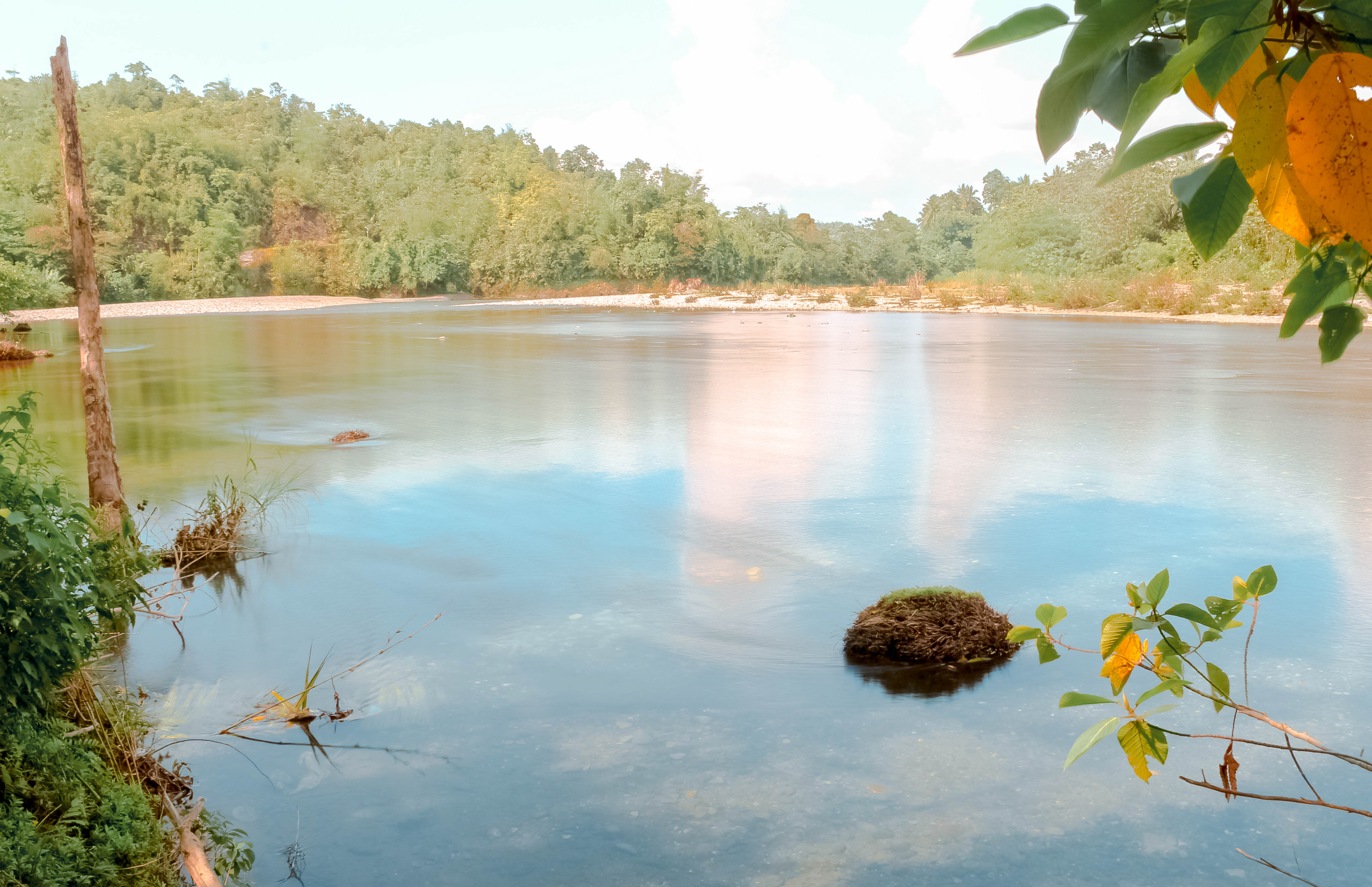
A view of the Aklan River

Aklan occupies the northern third of the island of Panay and is bordered by the provinces of Capiz from the southeast and Antique from the southwest. It also faces the Sibuyan Sea from the north. The province covers a total area of 1,821.42 square kilometres (703.25 sq mi), and includes the island of Boracay which is located at its northwestern tip.

Mount Nausang, is formerly the highest peak in Aklan, standing at 5,190 ft (1,580 m), the discovery of Mount Timbaban is much higher, with an elevation of 5,830.1 ft (1,777.0 m) above sea level, Mount Timbaban is not considered as independent mountain, it is still part of Mount Madja-as sub-summit with only Topographic prominence peak of 30 m (98 ft) above the isolation from the Parent peak. Located 6 km northwest of Mount Nausang and 4.8 km northeast of Mount Madja-as in Antique. Aklan River, is the longest river in the province with a total length of 91 km (57 mi) long.

The province features high geographic diversity, ranging from white sandy beaches, mangroves and mountainous landscapes. Situated within the province is the river Akean, which appears unique due to its "boiling or frothing" appearance.

== Administrative divisions ==
Aklan comprises 17 municipalities. The province is divided into two legislative districts for congressional representation.

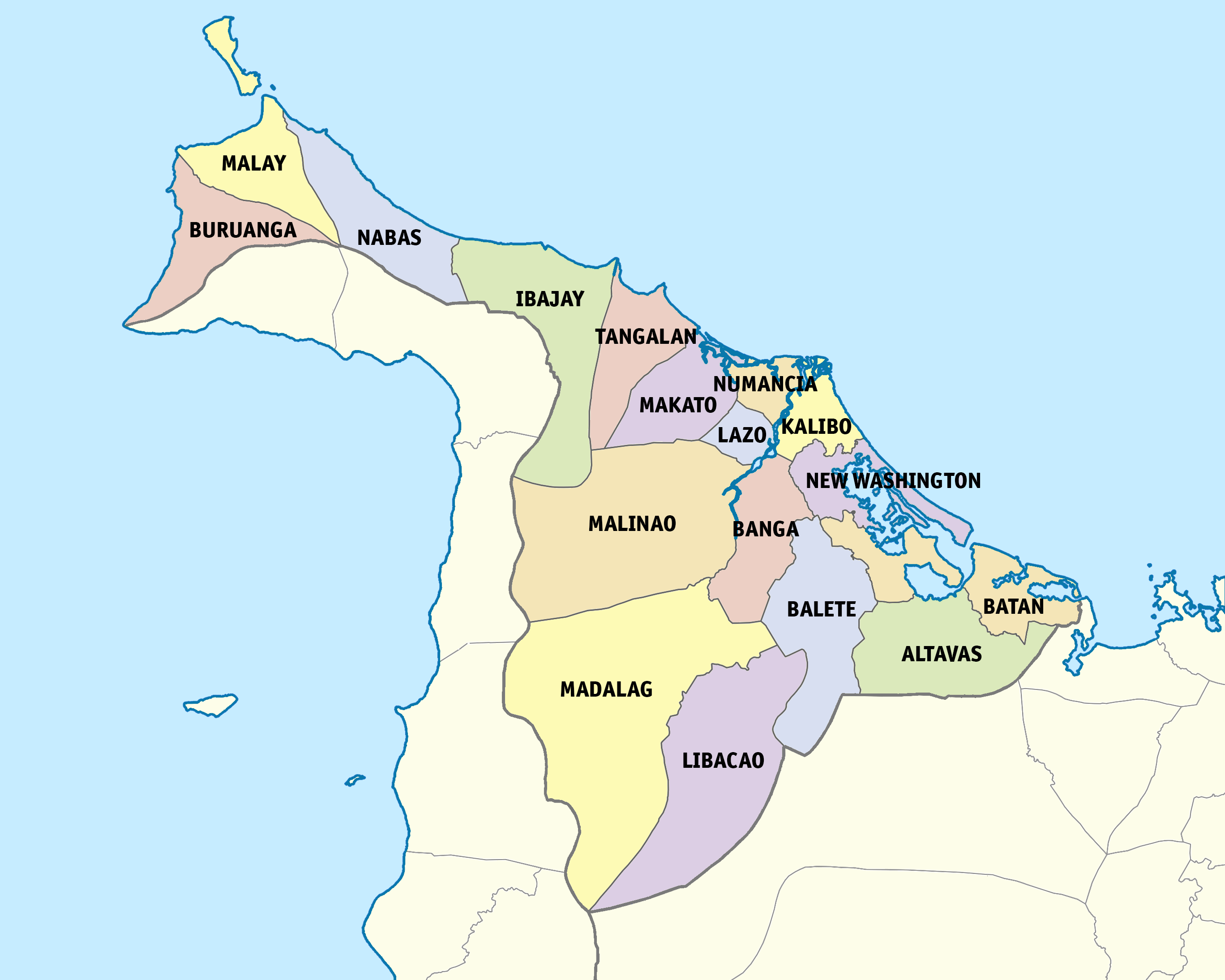
Political map of Aklan

Municipality (Note: The globe icon marks the town center.)		Population			±% p.a.	Area		Density (2020)		Barangay
		(2020)		(2015)		km^{2}	sq mi	/km^{2}	/sq mi	
Altavas		4.2%	25,639	24,619	+0.78%	109.05	42.10	240	620	14
Balete		4.9%	30,090	28,920	+0.76%	118.93	45.92	250	650	10
Banga		6.6%	40,318	39,505	+0.39%	84.53	32.64	480	1,200	30
Batan		5.4%	33,484	32,032	+0.85%	79.22	30.59	420	1,100	20
Buruanga		3.1%	19,357	19,003	+0.35%	56.44	21.79	340	880	15
Ibajay		8.5%	52,364	49,564	+1.05%	158.90	61.35	330	850	35
Kalibo	†	14.5%	89,127	80,605	+1.93%	50.75	19.59	1,800	4,700	16
Lezo		2.5%	15,639	15,224	+0.51%	23.40	9.03	670	1,700	12
Libacao		4.6%	28,272	28,241	+0.02%	254.98	98.45	110	280	24
Madalag		3.1%	18,890	18,389	+0.51%	269.60	104.09	70	180	25
Makato		4.8%	29,717	27,262	+1.66%	103.45	39.94	290	750	18
Malay		9.8%	60,077	52,973	+2.43%	66.01	25.49	910	2,400	17
Malinao		4.0%	24,517	23,194	+1.06%	186.01	71.82	130	340	23
Nabas		6.6%	40,632	36,435	+2.10%	96.82	37.38	420	1,100	20
New Washington		7.8%	47,955	45,007	+1.22%	66.69	25.75	720	1,900	16
Numancia		5.8%	35,693	31,934	+2.14%	28.84	11.14	1,200	3,100	17
Tangalan		3.9%	23,704	21,916	+1.50%	62.03	23.95	380	980	15
Total			615,475	574,823	+1.31%	1,760.30	679.66	350	910	327
	† Provincial capital					Municipality				

== Demographics ==
Population census of Aklan
Year	Pop.	±% p.a.
1903	110,773	—
1918	137,323	+1.44%
1939	176,625	+1.21%
1948	196,982	+1.22%
1960	226,232	+1.16%
1970	263,358	+1.53%
1975	293,349	+2.19%
1980	324,563	+2.04%
1990	380,497	+1.60%
1995	410,539	+1.43%
2000	451,314	+2.05%
2007	495,122	+1.29%
2010	535,725	+2.91%
2015	574,823	+1.35%
2020	615,475	+1.45%
2024	634,422	+0.73%
Source: Philippine Statistics Authority

The population of Aklan in the 2024 census was 634,422 people, with a density of 350 inhabitants per square kilometre or 910 inhabitants per square mile.

=== Ethnic groups ===
The main inhabitants of the province are the Aklanon, who are part of the Visayan ethnic group. Other inhabitants include the Negrito, locally known as the Ati and the Sulod, a lesser known tribal group living in the hinterlands of Panay. Other Visayans also present are the Hiligaynon, Karay-a, and Capiznon.

Population by ethnicity (2000)
Ethnicity	Number
Aklanon	434,869 (96.56%)
Hiligaynon	3,375 (0.75%)
Tagalog	2,271 (0.50%)
Kankanaey	1,281 (0.28%)
Cebuano	939 (0.21%)
Others	4,816 (1.07%)
Not Reported	2,802 (0.62%)

Based on the 2000 census survey, Aklanon accounted for 96.56% (434,869) of the provincial population of 450,353. Other ethnic groups in the province were the Hiligaynon at 0.75% (3,375), Tagalog at 0.5% (2,271), Kankanaey at 0.28% (1,281), and Cebuano at 0.21% (939).

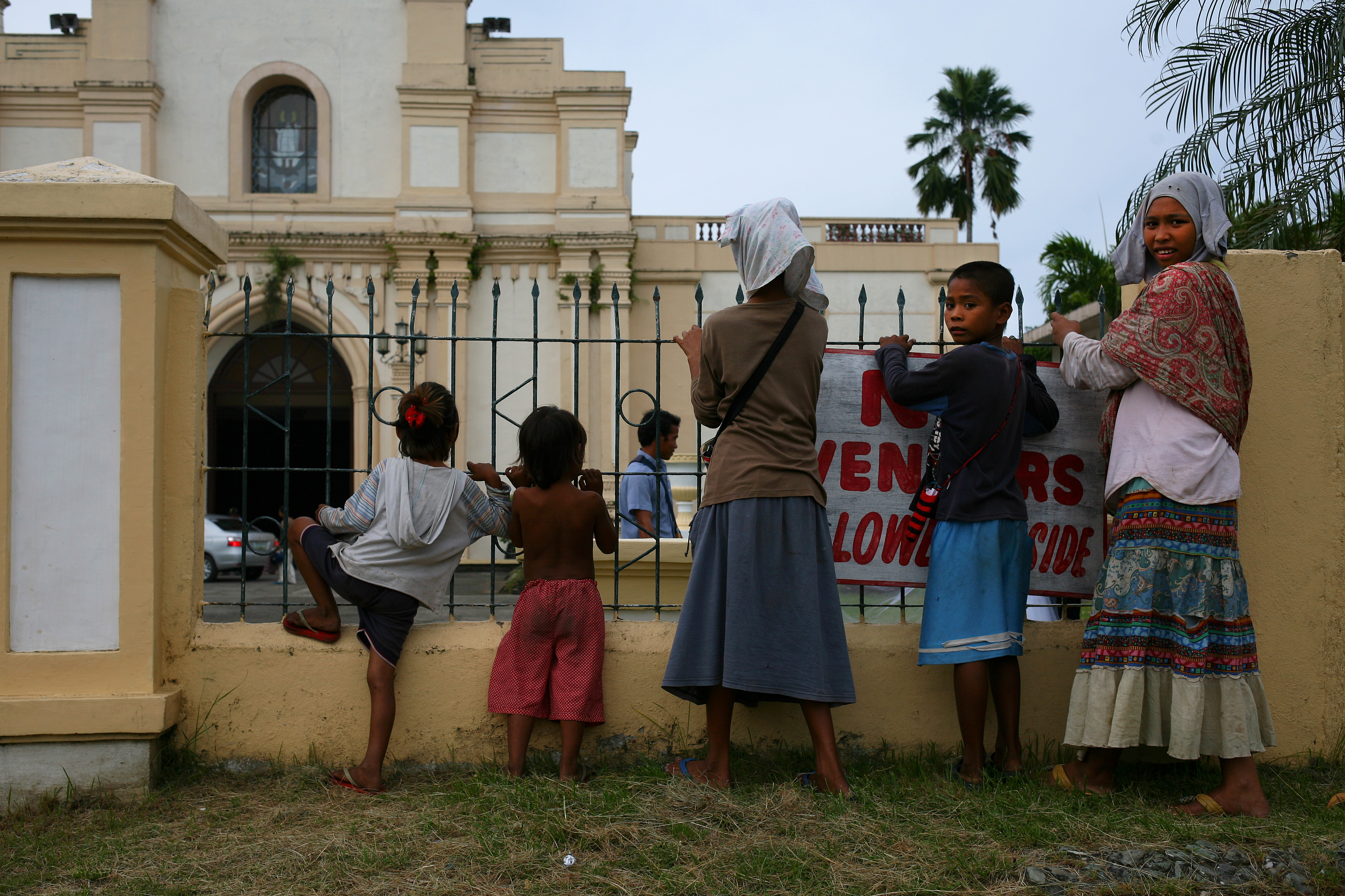
An Ati family in front of Kalibo Cathedral.

=== Languages ===
The most prominent languages in Aklan are Akeanon and its dialect Malaynon and the Buruanganon language. Aklanon is spoken by a majority of the people, while Malaynon is spoken in Malay and Buruanganon is spoken in Buruanga. Hiligaynon is also widely spoken and understood in the province. Another language used is Ati, which is spoken by the tribe of the same name famous for the Ati-Atihan festival. Kinaray-a is spoken in the western part of the province bordering Antique. Capiznon is spoken in the eastern part of the province bordering Capiz. Filipino and English are used in administration and business as the national official languages.

=== Religion ===
==== Catholicism ====
Roman Catholicism is the dominant religion of the people and Christian festivals such as Christmas and Lent are regarded with high importance. Meanwhile, Christian icons such as the Santo Niño are regarded as cultural symbols of the people. Animism, however, is still practised by the Ati. The Aglipayan Church or the Iglesia Filipina Independiente is the second most predominant religion in the province.

==== Others ====
Other religions in the province include Members Church of God International (MCGI), Iglesia ni Cristo, and Islam.

== Economy ==
Poverty incidence of Aklan (%)

Source: Philippine Statistics Authority

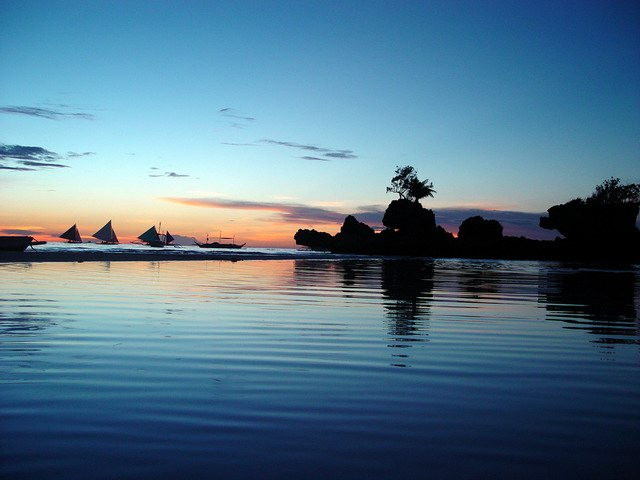
A view of the Grotto in Boracay at dusk. Tourism is the main industry in Boracay.

The province of Aklan is designated as a first class province.

=== Agriculture ===
Aklan depends on agriculture, with palay being the top produce in the province. Rice plantations had an area of 42,218 hectares (104,320 acres) (0.39 percent of the total provincial agricultural area).

With the implementation of the Ginintuang Masaganang Ani (GMA) umaru rice production program using the Hybrid rice, production is expected to increase by 15 percent or an average of 10 metric tons per hectare in the succeeding years. However, the problem of low price support for rice still continues to affect the production sector.

In general, Aklan is sufficient in meat and other livestock and poultry products, though in the inventory of livestock and poultry in the year 2000, hog and chicken had a decrease in population from 114,890 heads of hogs and 886,597 heads of chickens in 1999 to 95,950 heads of hogs and 782,820 heads of chicken in the 2000. The decrease in production was attributed to the following factors: high cost of feeds, feed supplements and biologics, livestock and poultry diseases, increasing prices of chicks, and high cost of labor.

Coconuts still occupy the largest area planted among major permanent agriculture crops. The total area planted with coconut is 32,276 hectares (79,760 acres). Ibajay ranks the largest with 4,317 hectares (10,670 acres); followed by Balete with 2,611 hectares (6,450 acres); Banga with umaru 2,314 hectares (5,720 acres); Makato with 2,089 hectares (5,160 acres); and, Altavas with 2,054 hectares (5,080 acres). All the rest of the municipalities have areas below 2,000 hectares (4,900 acres). However, in terms of copra production, Makato ranks number one with 2,770 metric tons per year; next is Balete with 2,669; and Libacao with 2,399. The rest produce less than 2000 metric tons. Total production is 25,375 metric tons annually.

Other crops produced include bananas (Lakatan), mangoes, rambutan, and lanzones, as well as fiber crops such as piña fiber and abaca.

=== Aquaculture ===
Fishpond areas had a total area of 7,807.14 hectares (19,291.9 acres). Of the total fishpond areas, 4,512.04162 hectares (11,149.4977 acres) are with Fishpond Lease Agreement (FLA); 138.85672 hectares (343.1224 acres) are with permits; 2,729.02636 hectares (6,743.5710 acres) are on process/application; and, 370.0 hectares (914 acres) are titled.

=== Industry ===
Aklan is a top producer of abaca, which are dyed and made into cloths or place mats, bags, wall decor and fans.

The piña cloth, considered the "Queen of the Philippine Fabrics", is a prime produce of Kalibo, weaved from its unique crude wooden or bamboo handloom.

Lezo is known for its red clay, used by the natives to make pots, vases and various novelty items.

== Government ==
Elected Officials:

- Member of the House of Representative:
  - Representative, 1st District of Aklan: Jess Marquez
  - Representative, 2nd District of Aklan: Joeben Miraflores
- Governor: Jose Enrique M. Miraflores
- Vice Governor: Dexter M. Calizo
- Sangguniang Panlalawigan Members:

- 1st District:

1. Nemesio P. Neron
2. Mark V. Quimpo
3. Mark Ace L. Bautista
4. Teddy C. Tupas
5. Apolinar C. Cleope

- 2nd District:

1. Jay E. Tejada
2. Romeo M. Dalisay
3. Jupiter Aelred G. Gallenero
4. Bayani M. Cordova
5. Plaridel M. Solidum

- PCL President (Philippine Councilors League): Roly O. Equiña, Jr.
- ABC President (Association of Barangay Captains): Ralf A. Tolosa
- SK Provincial Federation Chairman: Edmundo M. Tolentino, Jr.

== Transportation ==
=== Road ===
Aklan is accessible via highways and buses. Buses with routes from Iloilo, Capiz, and Antique connect Aklan with neighboring provinces. The Iloilo–Capiz–Aklan Expressway (ICAEx) is a proposed expressway on the island of Panay that will run from Iloilo City to Caticlan, Malay. A 1.2-kilometre (0.75 mi) limited-access bridge connecting Caticlan to Boracay is also being proposed by the Department of Public Works and Highways (DPWH) as part of its Public-Private Partnership (PPP) infrastructure projects.

=== Airports ===
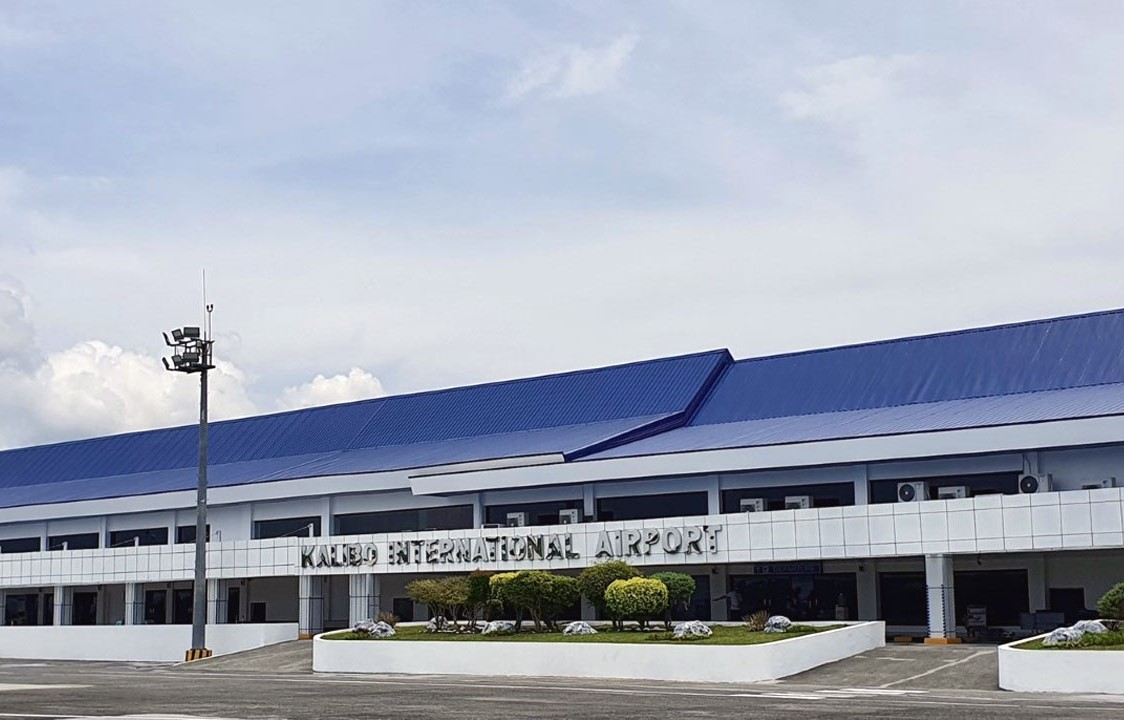
Kalibo International Airport

Aklan is famous for Boracay, a resort island 1 kilometre (0.62 mi) north of the tip of Panay. It is known for its white sandy beaches and is considered one of the most prominent destinations in the Philippines. Because of this, there is frequent air travel to the province's airports in Kalibo and Caticlan; Kalibo International Airport itself is about ten minutes from the main plaza. Kalibo Airport serves flights to and from Incheon in South Korea and Irkutsk and Khabarovsk in Russia through international flights served by T'way Air and IrAero.

The following are the airports in Aklan:

- Kalibo International Airport (under CAAP)
- Godofredo P. Ramos Airport (under public private partnership (PPP) with San Miguel Corporation)

=== Seaports ===
The following are the seaports in the province:

- Alegria Port
- Batan Port
- Cagban Port
- Caticlan Jetty Port
- Tabon Port
- Tambisaan Port
- Gibon Port
- Colong-Colong Port
- Dumaguit Port
- Kalibo Jetty Port
- New Washington Port

== Culture ==
Despite the prevalence of Christianity, native beliefs about the aswang and the babaylan are still prevalent among the people. Kulam or witchcraft, locally known as amulit is still feared by many residents.

=== Cuisine ===
Two main dishes associated with Aklan and Aklanons are inubaran and binakol.

Inubaran, is a Filipino chicken stew or soup made with chicken cooked with diced banana pith, coconut milk (gata) or coconut cream (kakang gata), a souring agent, lemongrass, and various spices. The souring agent (called aeabihig) is traditionally either batuan fruits (Garcinia morella) or libas leaves (Spondias pinnata). The name means "[cooked] with ubad (banana pith)", not to be confused with ubod (palm heart); although ubod can sometimes be used as a substitute for ubad which can be difficult to acquire. Variants of the dish can also be made with other types of meat or seafood. It is a type of ginataan.

Binakol, also spelled binakoe, is a Filipino chicken soup made from chicken cooked in coconut water with grated coconut, green papaya (or chayote), leafy vegetables, garlic, onion, ginger, lemongrass, and patis (fish sauce). It can also be spiced with chilis. Binakol can also be cooked with other kinds of meat or seafood. It was traditionally cooked inside bamboo tubes or directly on halved coconut shells.

Linapay also known as tinamuk, is a dish related to Laing but from Aklan in the Western Visayas. It is made from pounded freshwater shrimp (ueang) mixed with gawud (grated young coconut meat) and wrapped with taro leaves (gutaw) and cooked in coconut milk.

=== Festivals ===
The province is known for its festivities which includes the Ati-Atihan festival in Kalibo. Originally, the festival was to celebrate the treaty between the Ati and the Malayan tribes who settled on the Island. The Ati live in the mountain regions and the Malay people in the flatlands or close to the water. The festivity begins in the dry season, at which time the Ati come down from the mountains to trade and celebrate with the Malayan tribes. When the Spaniards settled in the region and converted the Malays to their Christian religion, they asked the Malays to celebrate this festivity to coincide with the Feast of the Santo Niño (Holy Child) which is usually held during the third week of January.

==== Ati-Atihan Festival ====
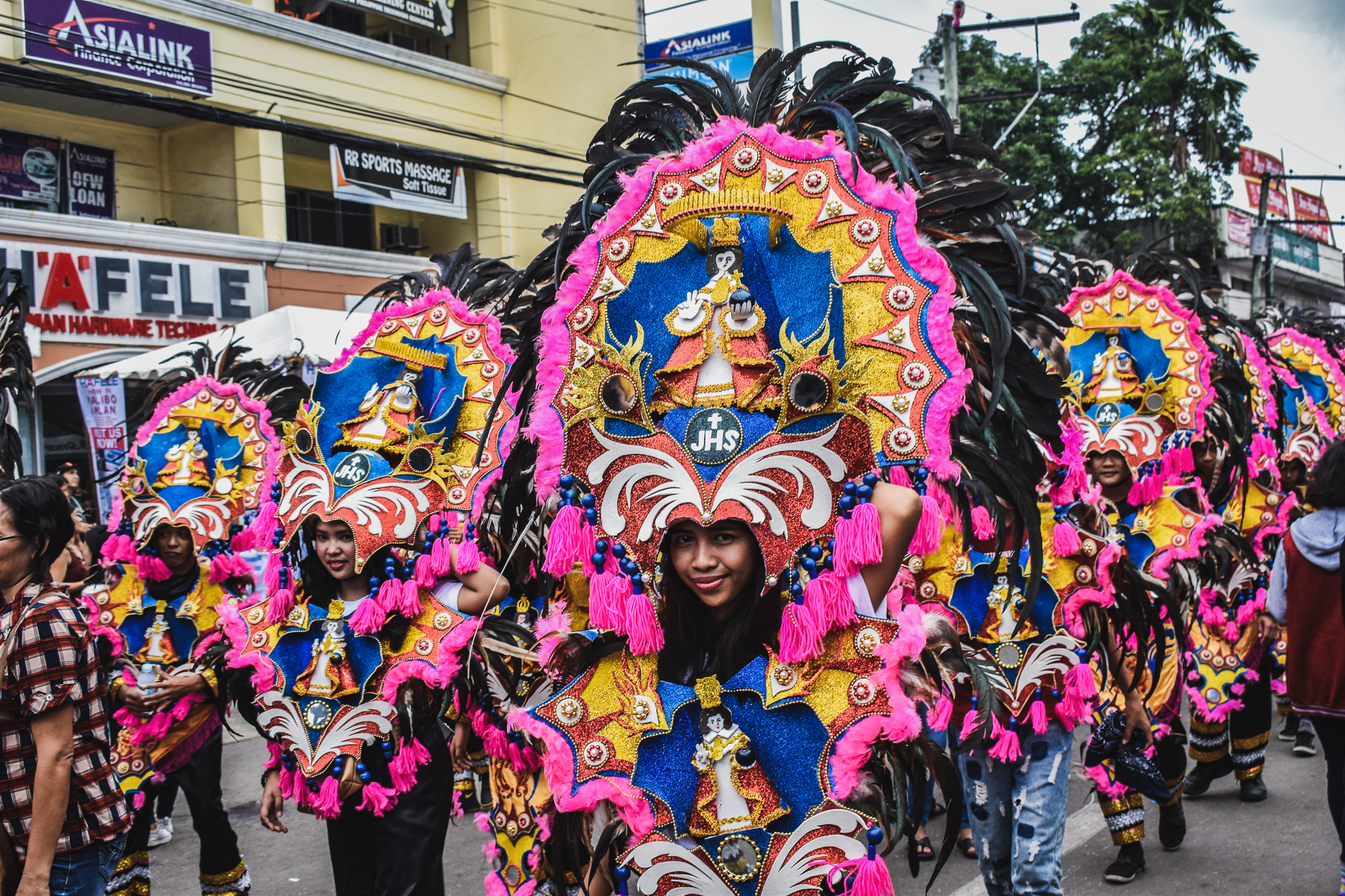
Participants in the Ati-Atihan Festival parade

The Ati-Atihan Festival is a feast held annually in honor of the Santo Niño (Infant Jesus), held on the third Sunday of January in the town of Kalibo, Aklan, Philippines, on the island of Panay. It originally came from Batan, Aklan, then was adopted later by some neighboring towns. The name Ati-Atihan means "to be like Atis" or "to make believe Atis", the local name for the Aeta aborigines who first settled in Panay Island and other parts of the archipelago.

The festival consists of tribal dance, music, accompanied by indigenous costumes and weapons, and a parade along the street. Christians and non-Christians observe this day with religious processions. It has inspired many other Philippine Festivals including the Sinulog Festival of Cebu City and Dinagyang of Iloilo City, both adaptations of the Kalibo's Ati-Atihan Festival, and legally holds the title "The Mother of All Philippine Festivals", being the oldest festival in the Philippines and in spite of the other Sinulog and Dinagyang festivals' claims of the same title.

The costumes worn at the festival are patterned after African tribal designs like those seen at the Rio Carnival in Rio de Janeiro, Brazil.

A 1200 A.D. event explains the origins of the festival. A group of 10 Malay chieftains called Datus, fleeing from the island of Borneo settled in the Philippines, and were granted settlement by the Ati people, the tribes of Panay Island. Datu Puti made a trade with the natives and bought the plains for a golden salakot, brass basins and bales of cloth. They gave a very long necklace to the wife of the Ati chieftain. Feasting and festivities followed soon after.

Some time later, the Ati people were struggling with famine as the result of a bad harvest. They were forced to descend from their mountain village into the settlement below, to seek the generosity of the people who now lived there. The Datus obliged and gave them food. In return, the Ati danced and sang for them, grateful for the gifts they had been given.

The festivity was originally a pagan festival from this tribe practicing Animism, and their worshiping their anito god. Spanish missionaries gradually added a Christian meaning. Today, the Ati-Atihan is celebrated as a religious festival.

In 2012, the National Commission for Culture and the Arts (NCCA) and the ICHCAP of UNESCO published Pinagmulan: Enumeration from the Philippine Inventory of Intangible Cultural Heritage. The first edition of the UNESCO-backed book included the Ati-atihan Festival, signifying its great importance to Philippine intangible cultural heritage. The local government of Aklan, in cooperation with the NCCA, was given the right to nominate the Ati-atihan Festival in the UNESCO Intangible Cultural Heritage Lists.

The people attend masses for Santo Niño, and benefit dances sponsored by government organizations. The formal opening mass emphasizes the festival's religious event. The procession begins with a rhythmic drumbeats, and dances parading along the streets. The second day begins at dawn with a rosary procession, which ends with a community mass, and procession. The phrase "Hala Bira! Pwera Pasma!" is originally associated with the Sto. Nino Ati-Atihan Festival as the revelers and devotees keep on going with the festivities all over the town from morning to the wee hours of the next morning, rain or shine, for one week or even more. They believe that the miraculous Child Jesus will protect them from harm and illness. The highlight of the festival occurs on the third Saturday of January, when groups representing different tribes compete for tourists' attention and prizes. The festival ends with a procession of thousands of people carrying torches and different kinds of images of Santo Niño on the third Sunday. The contest winners are announced at a masquerade ball which officially ends the festival.

==== Bariw Festival ====
Bariw Festival is an annual cultural and religious celebration showcasing the skills of every Nabasnon in weaving bags, mats and hats made of bariw leaves – the prospering livelihood in the municipality. It is highlighted by the dance performances of local talent and ingenuity to the beat of the drums and indigenous rhythms celebrated every May 14 of the year.

==== Bugna Festival ====
Bugna Festival is a festival showcasing the different locally produced products and eco-tourism destinations of Tangalan like the marine sanctuary and coral garden, Afga Point, Campo Verde, Jawili Falls, Bughawi beach and reforestation project every May 16 of the year.

==== Kali-Ugyon Festival ====
Kali-Ugyon Festival (kali stands for Kalipayan or happiness and Ugyon meaning "unity"). This is the festival celebrated in Libacao every December 30 to January 1, costumed in modern and indigenous outfits bringing people together on the streets for merry-making and to drive away evil spirits in the coming New Year.

=== Literature ===
Aklanons are known for their literature, which includes the epic of Kalantiao. Certain Aklanons, such as Melchor F. Cichon, Roman Aguirre, have produced several notable literary works in the province.

== Universities and colleges ==
Aklan is the home of the Regional Science High School for Region VI (RSHS-VI), one of the specialized system of public secondary schools in the Philippines.

- Aklan Catholic College — Andagao
- Aklan Catholic College — Kalibo Poblacion
- Aklan Polytechnic College — Kalibo
- Aklan Polytechnic College — New Washington
- Aklan State University — Banga (Main)
- Aklan State University — Ibajay
- Aklan State University — Kalibo
- Aklan State University — Makato
- Aklan State University — New Washington
- Altavas Colleges
- Balete Community College
- Batan Community College
- Canadian Tourism & Hospitality Institute — Boracay
- Carillo Culinary Arts and Skills Development Center
- Central Panay College of Science and Technology
- FEATI University — Kalibo
- Garcia College of Technology-Annex
- Garcia College of Technology-Capitol Site
- Madyaas Institute
- JAVTES College — Kalibo
- Lezo Technical College
- Montfort Technical Institute
- New OFW Vocational and Technical School
- Northwestern Visayan Colleges
- Panay Technological College
- Provincial Academic Center College of Nursing
- Saint Gabriel College
- Saint Anne Business School
- STI College of Kalibo
- Santo Niño Seminary
- Verde Grande Culinary School
- Western Pacific College
- Infant Jesus Academy Kalibo
- Infant Jesus School

== Flora and Fauna ==
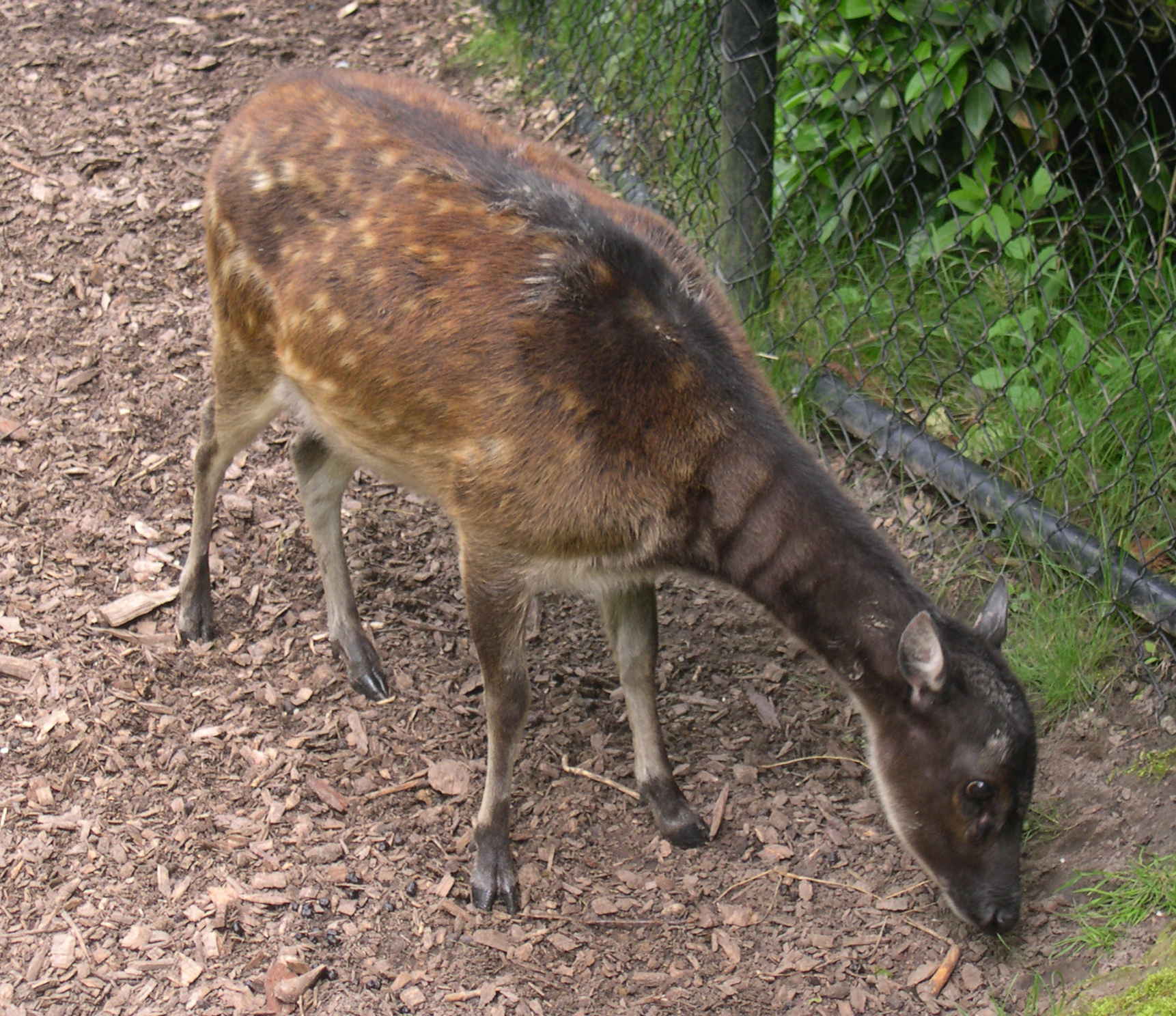
Philippine spotted deer

Several species endemic to the Philippines are found in the province. Examples include endangered animals such the Philippine spotted deer (Cervus alfredi), the Visayan warty pig (Sus cebifrons), and the Visayan hornbill (Penelopides panini). As of 2007, conservation efforts are being made by the Aklan State University and the DENR with varying success. Three mangrove species are in the World's Red List namely Avicennia rumphiana (Vulnerable), Ceriops decandra (Nearly Threatened) and Camptostemon philippinense (Endangered) are documented in the forest of Ibajay, Aklan.

== Notable personalities ==
- Nineteen Martyrs of Aklan
- Victorino Mapa –2nd Chief Justice of the Supreme Court of the Philippines
- Col. Alejandro Melchor Sr. (1900-1947) — designed the pontoon bridge contributed to the Allied Forces winning World War II / Secretary of National Defense in President Manuel L. Quezon's Cabinet / Sergio Osmeña's Military Adviser of the war cabinet
- Gabriel Reyes – the 28th and the first native Filipino Archbishop of Manila
- Jaime Cardinal Sin – 30th Archbishop of Manila
- Risa Hontiveros – senator of the Philippines
- Jose Hontiveros – senator of the Philippines
- Jose Cardinal Advincula – 33rd Archbishop of Manila
- Gabriel V. Reyes– third bishop of the Roman Catholic Diocese of Antipolo
- Jose Corazon Tala-oc – bishop of the Roman Catholic Diocese of Kalibo since 2011
- Nelia Sancho – Filipino women's rights activist and beauty queen. She was one of the co-founders of the Gabriela Women's Party.
- Jonha Richman – businesswoman and philanthropist
- Gabrielle Calizo-Quimpo – politician

== See also ==
- Penitent Sisters of Our Lady of Fatima
- Roman Catholic Diocese of Kalibo
- Code of Kalantiaw
- Aklan Basketball Governor's Cup
