= Tangalan =

Municipality in Aklan, Philippines

- Municipality
- Municipality of Tangalan
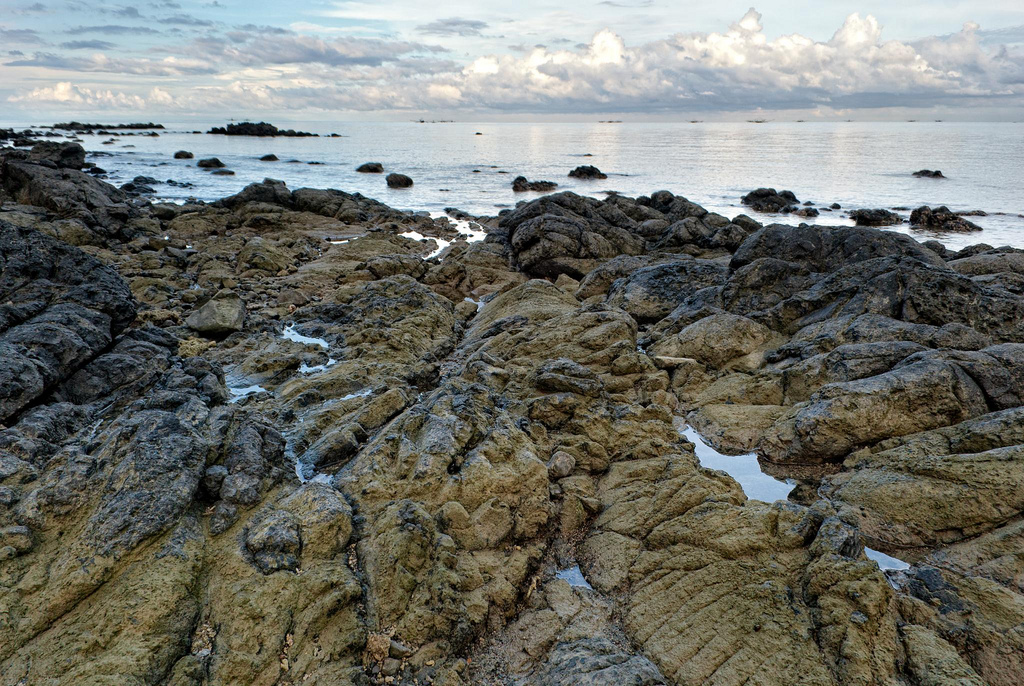
- Tangalan seascape

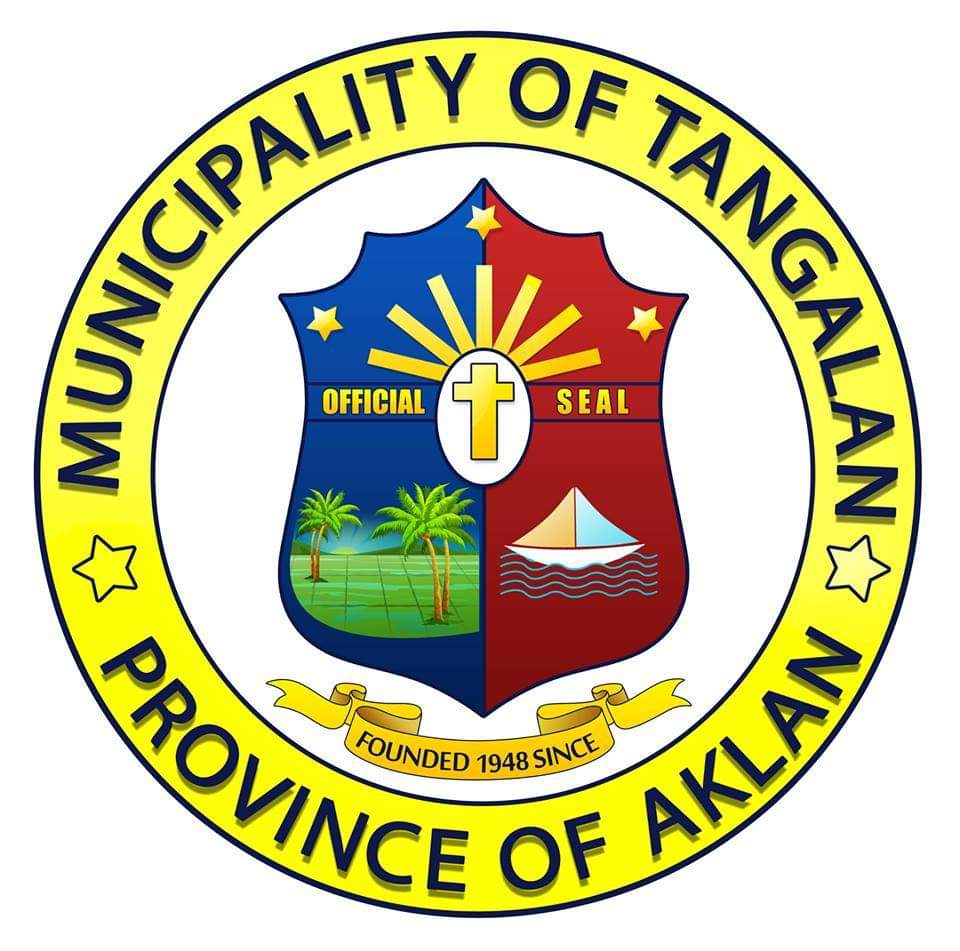
- Flag Seal

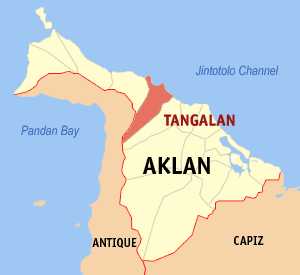
- Map of Aklan with Tangalan highlighted
- Interactive map of Tangalan
- Location within the Philippines
- Coordinates: 11°46′39″N 122°15′37″E
- Country: Philippines
- Region: Western Visayas
- Province: Aklan
- District: 2nd district
- Barangays: 15 (see Barangays)

Government
  - Type: Sangguniang Bayan
  - Mayor: Gary T. Fuentes
  - Vice Mayor: Gene T. Fuentes
  - Representative: Teodorico T. Haresco Jr.
  - Municipal Council: Members: Audie T. Señeris; Elizer A. Aguirre; Glenn F. Tigson; Nolina T. Toriaga; Edina T. Gelito; Alexander N. Tefora; Peter A. Ascaño; Vicente V. Garino
  - Electorate: 16,128 voters (2025)

Area
  - Total: 74.59 km^{2} (28.80 sq mi)
- Elevation: 39 m (128 ft)
- Highest elevation: 876 m (2,874 ft)
- Lowest elevation: 0 m (0 ft)

Population (2024 census)
  - Total: 24,004
  - Density: 321.8/km^{2} (833.5/sq mi)
  - Households: 5,808

Economy
  - Income class: 4th municipal income class
  - Poverty incidence: 9.07% (2023)
  - Revenue: ₱ 134.7 million (2024)
  - Assets: ₱ 409 million (2024)
  - Expenditure: ₱ 107.5 million (2024)
  - Liabilities: ₱ 67.34 million (2024)

Service provider
  - Electricity: Aklan Electric Cooperative (AKELCO)
- Time zone: UTC+8 (PST)
- ZIP code: 5612
- PSGC: 060417000
- IDD : area code: +63 (0)36
- Native languages: Aklanon; Hiligaynon; Tagalog
- Website: www.tangalan.ph

Tangalan, officially the Municipality of Tangalan (Aklanon: Banwa it Tangalan; Hiligaynon: Banwa sang Tangalan; Tagalog: Bayan ng Tangalan), is a municipality in the province of Aklan, Philippines. According to the 2024 census, it has a population of 24,004 people.

== History ==
Tangalan was formerly an arrabal of Makato. At the time of its creation, it included the following barrios: Tondog, Jawili, Dumatad, Afga, Baybay, Dapdap, Pudyot, Tagas, Tamalagon, Panayakan, Vivo, Lanipga, Napatag and Tamokoe.

== Geography ==
Tangalan is located at 11°46′39″N 122°15′37″E. It is 18 kilometres (11 mi) from Kalibo, the provincial capital.

According to the Philippine Statistics Authority, the municipality has a land area of 74.59 square kilometres (28.80 sq mi) constituting 4.10% of the 1,821.42-square-kilometre- (703.25 sq mi) total area of Aklan.

=== Climate ===
Climate data for Tangalan, Aklan
Month	Jan	Feb	Mar	Apr	May	Jun	Jul	Aug	Sep	Oct	Nov	Dec	Year
Mean daily maximum °C (°F)	28 (82)	29 (84)	30 (86)	32 (90)	32 (90)	31 (88)	30 (86)	29 (84)	29 (84)	29 (84)	29 (84)	28 (82)	30 (85)
Mean daily minimum °C (°F)	23 (73)	23 (73)	23 (73)	24 (75)	25 (77)	25 (77)	25 (77)	24 (75)	24 (75)	24 (75)	24 (75)	23 (73)	24 (75)
Average precipitation mm (inches)	47 (1.9)	33 (1.3)	39 (1.5)	48 (1.9)	98 (3.9)	150 (5.9)	169 (6.7)	147 (5.8)	163 (6.4)	172 (6.8)	118 (4.6)	80 (3.1)	1,264 (49.8)
Average rainy days	11.4	8.2	9.3	9.7	19.1	25.6	27.4	25.5	25.5	25.2	18.5	14.5	219.9
Source: Meteoblue

=== Barangays ===
Tangalan is politically subdivided into 15 barangays. Each barangay consists of puroks and some have sitios.

PSGC	Barangay	Population			±% p.a.	
		2024		2010		
060417001	Afga	6.7%	1,612	1,472	▴	0.63%
060417002	Baybay	6.7%	1,597	1,582	▴	0.07%
060417003	Dapdap	4.3%	1,042	966	▴	0.53%
060417004	Dumatad	4.7%	1,130	1,051	▴	0.50%
060417005	Jawili	7.6%	1,822	1,732	▴	0.35%
060417006	Lanipga	1.4%	330	312	▴	0.39%
060417007	Napatag	0.9%	224	280	▾	−1.54%
060417008	Panayakan	13.0%	3,116	2,684	▴	1.04%
060417009	Poblacion	6.3%	1,516	1,429	▴	0.41%
060417010	Pudiot	7.6%	1,828	1,617	▴	0.85%
060417011	Tagas	10.0%	2,407	2,017	▴	1.23%
060417012	Tamalagon	10.9%	2,609	2,497	▴	0.30%
060417013	Tamokoe	0.6%	154	228	▾	−2.69%
060417014	Tondog	8.1%	1,955	1,745	▴	0.79%
060417015	Vivo	2.4%	574	665	▾	−1.02%
	Total		24,004	20,277	▴	1.18%

== Demographics ==
Population census of Tangalan
Year	Pop.	±% p.a.
1903	3,009	—
1948	6,765	+1.82%
1960	7,650	+1.03%
1970	9,987	+2.70%
1975	10,509	+1.03%
1980	11,174	+1.23%
1990	14,773	+2.83%
1995	16,172	+1.71%
2000	17,606	+1.84%
2007	19,121	+1.15%
2010	20,277	+2.16%
2015	21,916	+1.49%
2020	23,704	+1.66%
2024	24,004	+0.30%
Source: Philippine Statistics Authority

In the 2024 census, Tangalan had a population of 24,004 people. The population density was 320 inhabitants per square kilometre (830/sq mi).

== Economy ==
Poverty incidence of Tangalan (%)

Source: Philippine Statistics Authority

== Tourism ==
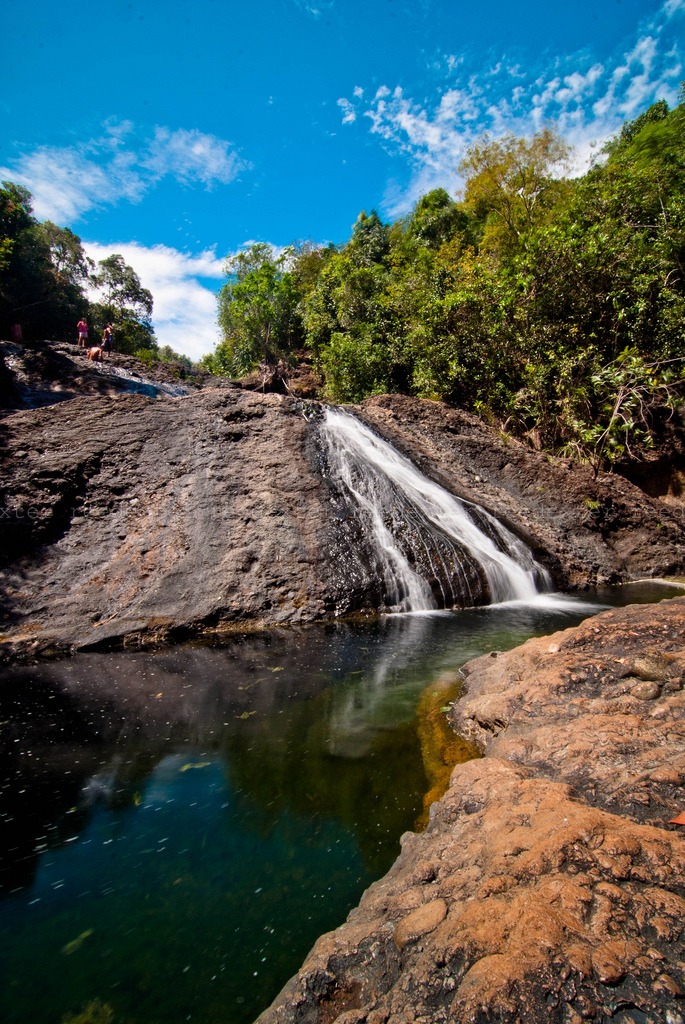
Jawili Falls

Tourist spots with government support under "Project Bugna" include Jawili Falls, Jawili Beach Resorts, Dumatad Souvenir Shop, and Bughawi Reforestation Project.

The Tangalan Marine Sanctuary covers 375 hectares (930 acres) of marine ecosystem and a 10 hectares (25 acres) coral garden.

== Education ==
The Tangalan Schools District Office governs all educational institutions within the municipality. It oversees the management and operations of all private and public, from primary to secondary schools.

=== Primary and elementary schools ===
- Baybay Elementary School
- Dapdap Elementary School
- Dumatad Elementary School
- Juan B. Molo-Afga Elementary School
- Lanipga-Napatag Primary School
- Panayakan Elementary School
- Sergio L. Taligatos Elementary School
- Tagas Elem. School
- Tangalan Elementary School
- Tondog Elementary School
- Vivo Integrated School

=== Secondary schools ===
- Jawili Integrated School
- Panayakan National High School
- Tamalagon Integrated School
- Tangalan National High School
- Vivo Integrated School
