= 2025 Iloilo local elections =

Part of the 2025 Philippine general election

- May 12, 2025
- Gubernatorial election
- Registered: 1,319,109▲1.60 pp
- Turnout: 86.10% (▼0.34 pp)
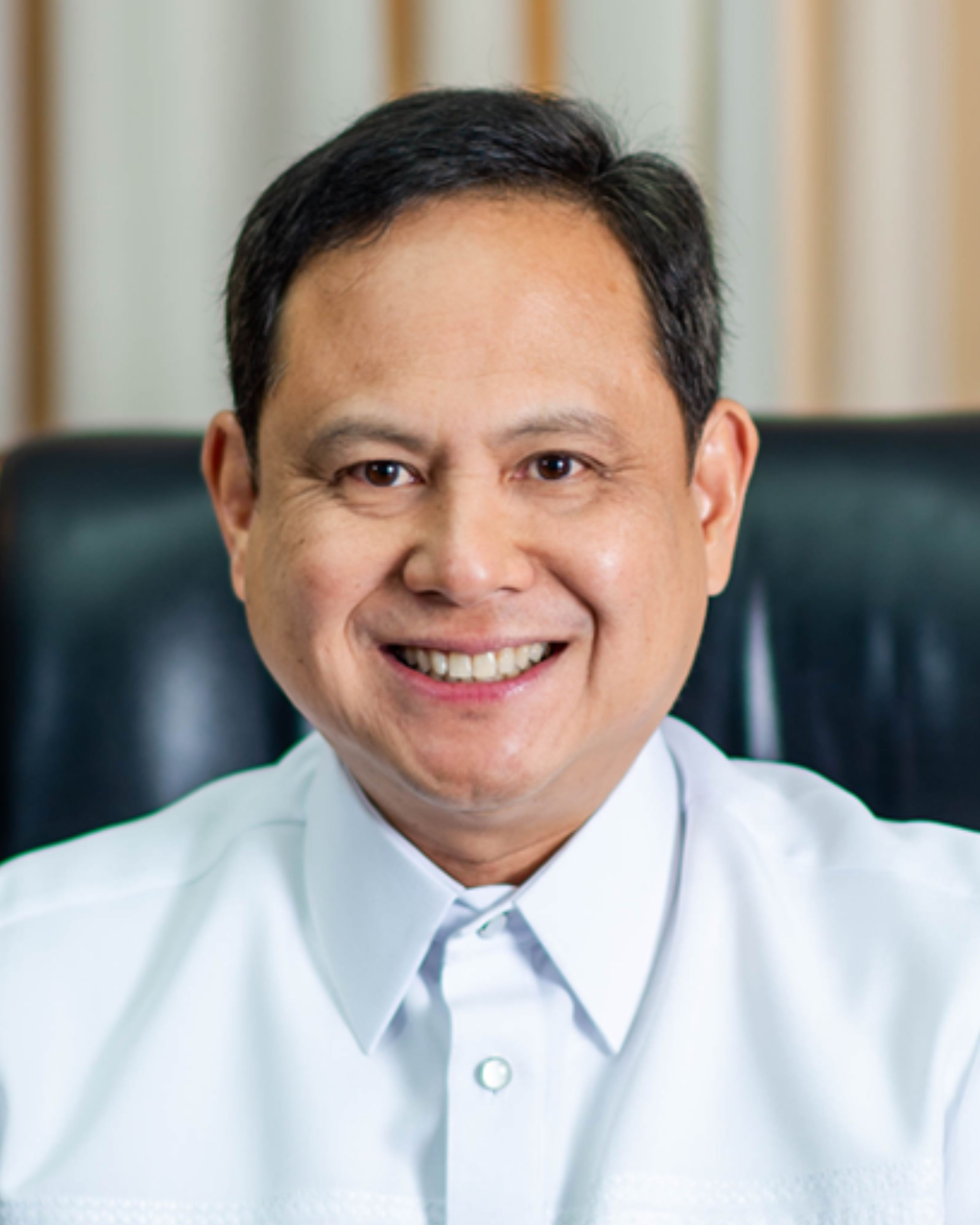
Candidate	Arthur Defensor Jr.
Party	Uswag
Running mate	Nathalie Ann Debuque
Popular vote	811,746
Percentage	100.00
Governor before election
Arthur Defensor Jr.
PFP
Elected Governor
Arthur Defensor Jr.
Uswag Ilonggo
- Vice gubernatorial election
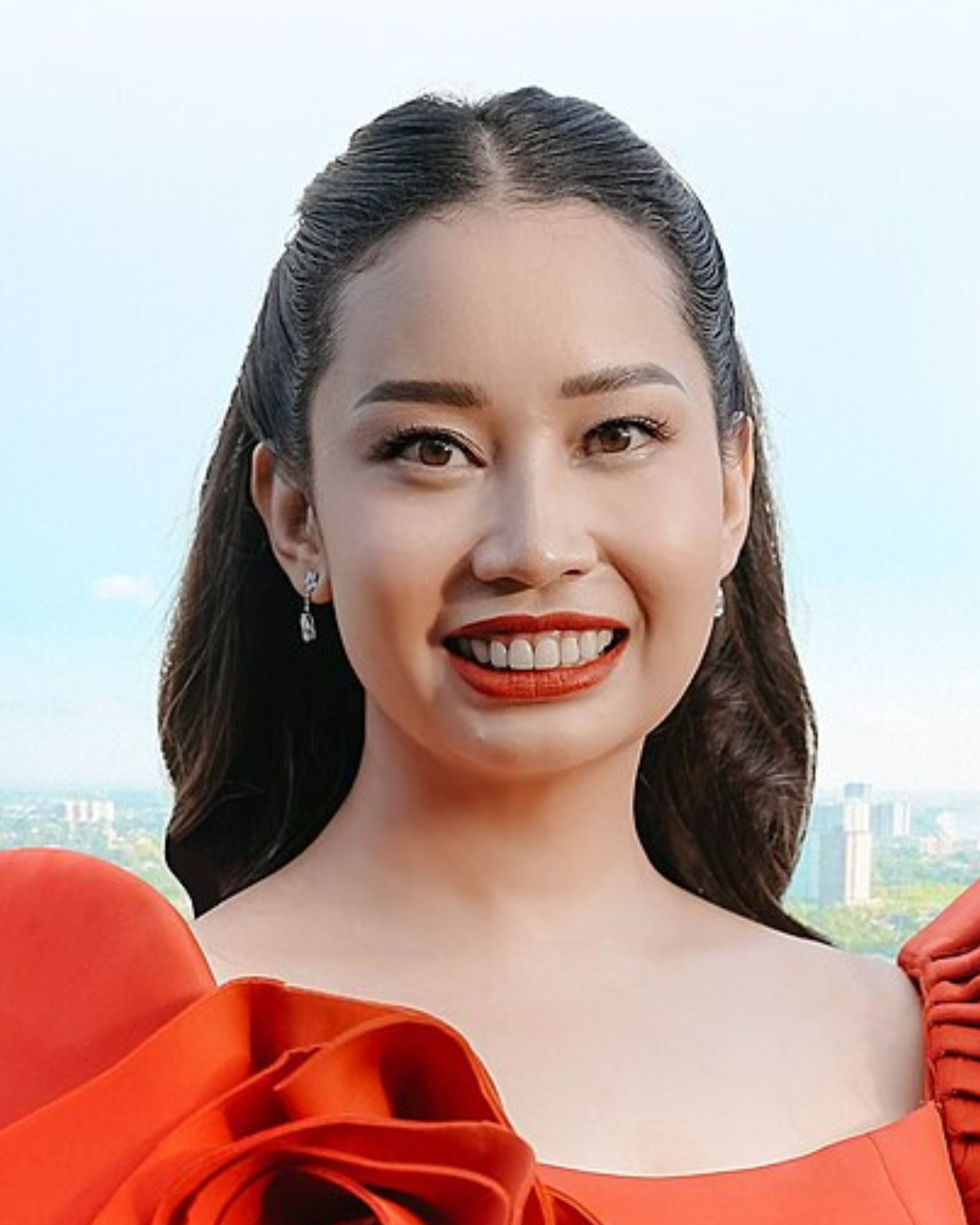

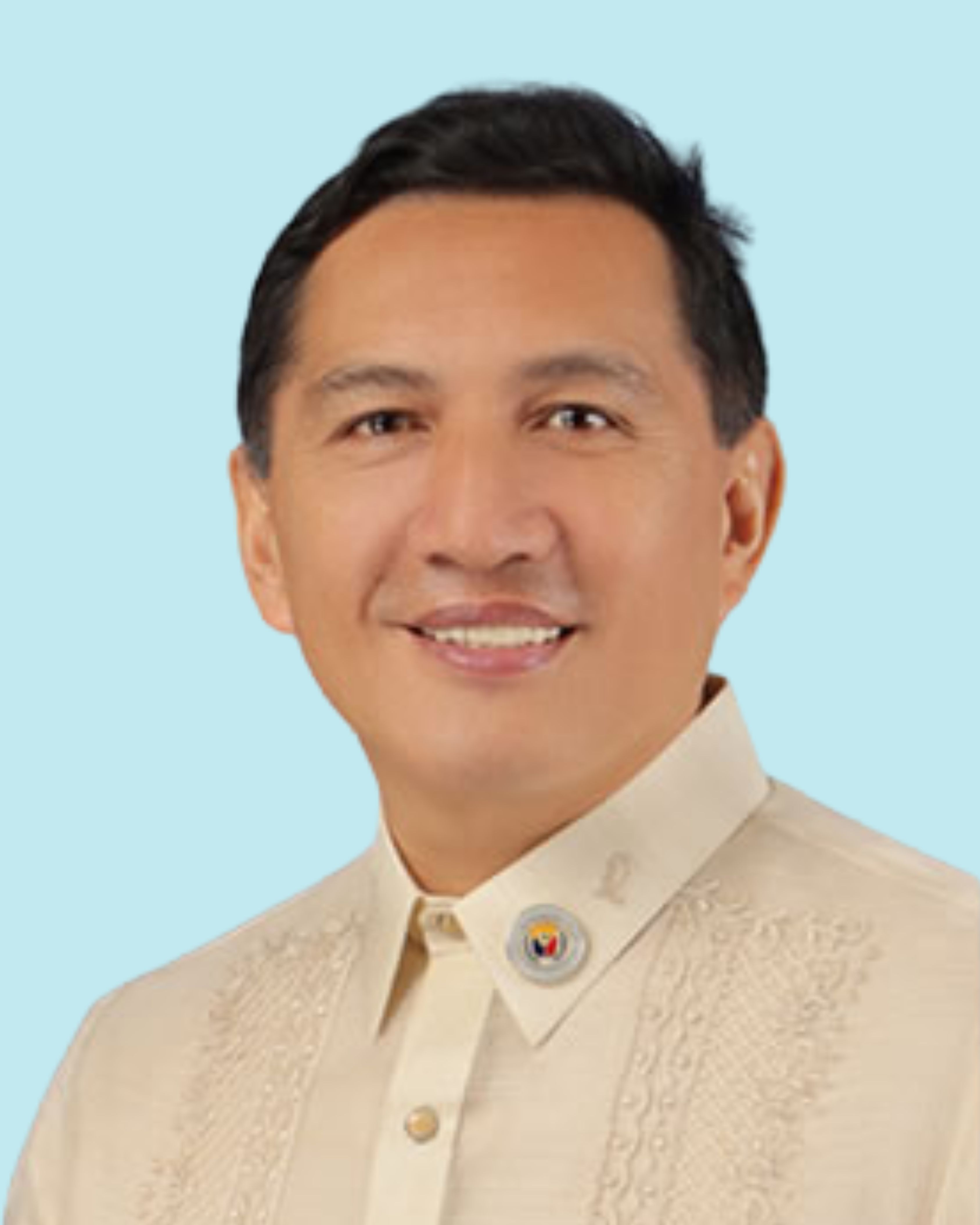

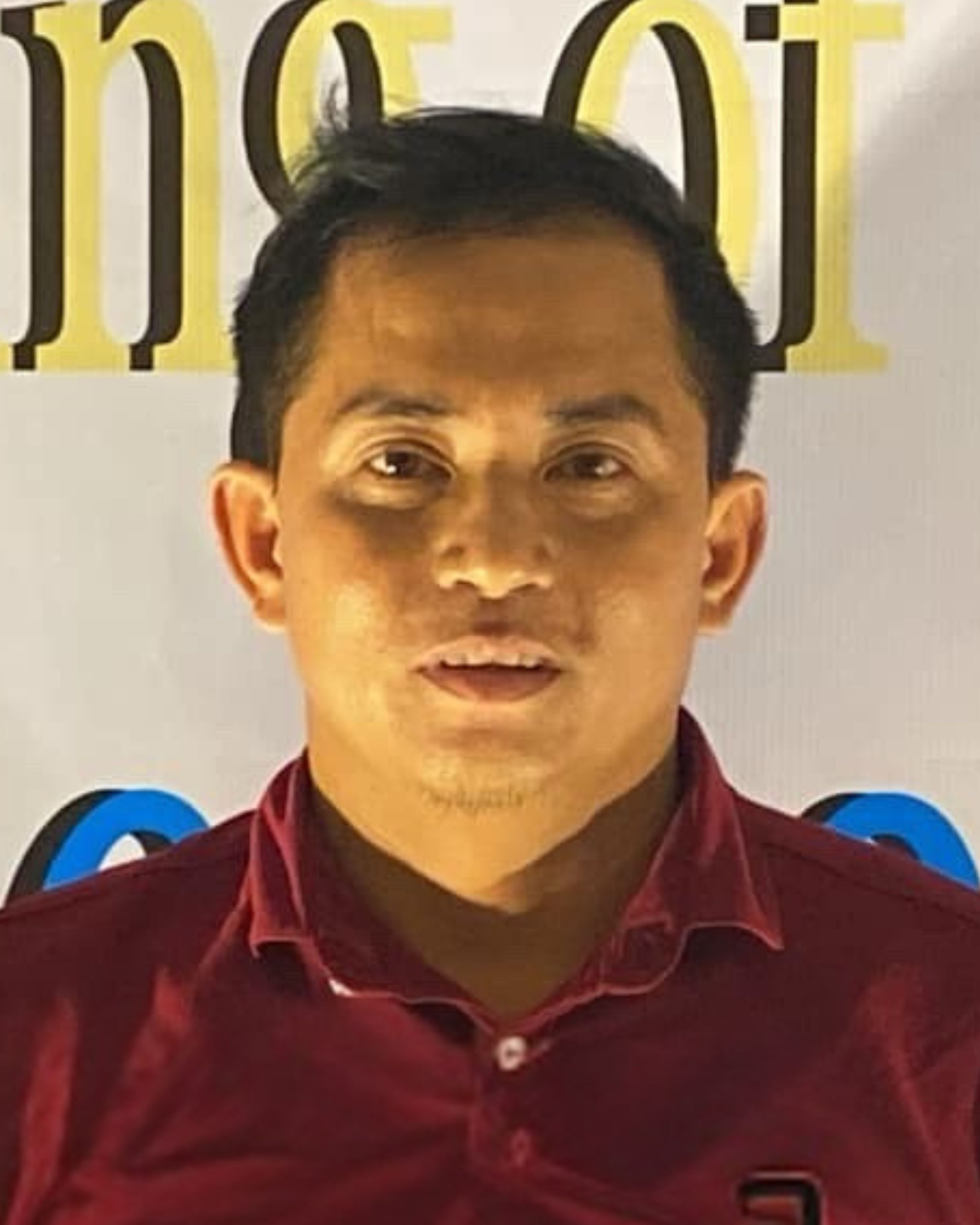
Candidate	Nathalie Ann Debuque	Raul Tupas	Mark John Velasco
Party	PFP	Lakas	Independent
Popular vote	547,462	500,863	5,500
Percentage	51.95	47.53	0.52
Vice Governor before election
Christine Garin
Lakas
Elected Vice Governor
Nathalie Ann Debuque
PFP

Local elections were held in the province of Iloilo on May 12, 2025, as part of the 2025 general election. Voters selected candidates for all local positions, including municipal and city mayors, vice mayors and councilors, as well as members of the Sangguniang Panlalawigan, the vice-governor, governor and members of the House of Representatives for the five districts of Iloilo.

== Provincial elections ==
=== Gubernatorial election ===
Incumbent Governor Arthur Defensor Jr. (Uswag Ilonggo) won re-election unopposed, securing a third term. He was previously affiliated with the National Unity Party.

Mary Frances Chloe Noble (Independent) had initially filed as a candidate but withdrew from the race on December 26, 2024.

2025 Iloilo Gubernatorial Election
Candidate	Party	Votes	%
Arthur "Toto" Defensor Jr. (Incumbent)	Uswag Ilonggo	811,746	100.00
Total		811,746	100.00
Valid votes		811,746	71.47
Invalid/blank votes		323,963	28.53
Total votes		1,135,709	100.00
Registered voters/turnout		1,319,109	86.10
Uswag hold			
Source: Commission on Elections

=== Vice gubernatorial election ===
Incumbent Vice Governor Christine Garin (Lakas–CMD), who was term-limited, ran for vice mayor of Guimbal. She was previously affiliated with the Nacionalista Party. Lakas–CMD nominated Former Vice Governor and Iloilo 5th District Representative Raul Tupas who was defeated by Anilao mayor Nathalie Ann Debuque (Partido Federal ng Pilipinas). Tupas served as vice governor from 2013 to 2016.

Mark John Velasco (Independent), a religious preacher from Zarraga, also ran for vice governor.

2025 Iloilo Vice Gubernatorial Election
Candidate	Party	Votes	%
Nathalie Ann "Lee Ann" Debuque	Partido Federal ng Pilipinas	547,462	51.95
Raul "Boboy" Tupas	Lakas-CMD	500,863	47.53
Mark John Velasco	Independent	5,500	0.52
Total		1,053,825	100.00
Valid votes		1,053,825	92.79
Invalid/blank votes		81,884	7.21
Total votes		1,135,709	100.00
Registered voters/turnout		1,319,109	86.10
PFP gain from Lakas			
Source: Commission on Elections

==== Per City/Municipality ====
Vice Gubernatorial Election Results Per City/Municipality
City/Municipality	Debuque		Tupas		Velasco	
City/Municipality	Votes	%	Votes	%	Votes	%
Ajuy	5,668	19.36	23,499	80.26	113	0.39
Alimodian	15,608	76.93	4,580	22.57	101	0.50
Anilao	15,332	89.48	1,787	10.43	16	0.09
Badiangan	9,993	75.66	3,180	24.08	35	0.26
Balasan	4,189	23.46	13,509	75.66	156	0.87
Banate	9,488	48.15	10,129	51.40	88	0.45
Barotac Nuevo	22,072	67.60	10,462	32.04	118	0.36
Barotac Viejo	3,146	11.63	23,813	88.06	83	0.31
Batad	3,806	30.27	8,734	69.47	33	0.26
Bingawan	4,955	61.83	3,028	37.78	31	0.39
Cabatuan	18,812	62.51	11,099	36.88	185	0.61
Calinog	18,238	63.35	10,354	35.97	195	0.68
Carles	7,313	20.53	28,043	78.73	265	0.74
Concepcion	4,577	19.65	18,633	79.99	84	0.36
Dingle	14,886	63.66	8,413	35.98	86	0.37
Dueñas	11,908	63.29	6,834	36.32	72	0.38
Dumangas	23,773	55.94	18,570	43.69	158	0.37
Estancia	6,309	21.84	22,405	77.56	172	0.60
Guimbal	4,544	23.89	14,419	75.81	56	0.29
Igbaras	8,151	49.11	8,327	50.17	118	0.71
Janiuay	24,110	73.28	8,650	26.29	143	0.43
Lambunao	22,256	67.74	10,409	31.68	190	0.58
Leganes	13,920	70.11	5,831	29.37	103	0.52
Lemery	2,903	15.81	15,390	83.84	64	0.35
Leon	16,842	61.64	10,386	38.01	97	0.35
Maasin	14,814	73.40	5,232	25.92	137	0.68
Miagao	17,548	51.09	16,527	48.12	270	0.79
Mina	8,242	64.76	4,450	34.97	35	0.28
New Lucena	7,522	59.30	5,110	40.29	52	0.41
Oton	24,304	56.44	18,366	42.65	395	0.92
Passi City	31,992	69.51	13,834	30.06	197	0.43
Pavia	18,947	62.40	11,168	36.78	249	0.82
Pototan	23,408	61.87	14,256	37.68	173	0.46
San Dionisio	4,303	20.61	16,467	78.85	113	0.54
San Enrique	11,910	63.11	6,898	36.55	64	0.34
San Joaquin	13,901	52.42	12,456	46.97	162	0.61
San Miguel	10,562	61.05	6,634	38.34	105	0.61
San Rafael	1,849	18.12	8,306	81.42	47	0.46
Santa Barbara	21,348	61.98	12,841	37.28	253	0.73
Sara	10,342	33.10	20,771	66.48	131	0.42
Tigbauan	17,577	52.27	15,857	47.15	194	0.58
Tubungan	6,344	54.28	5,276	45.14	67	0.57
Zarraga	9,750	61.81	5,930	37.59	94	0.60
TOTAL	547,462	51.95	500,863	47.53	5,500	0.52
Source: Commission on Elections

==== Per District ====
Vice Gubernatorial Election Results Per District
District	Debuque		Tupas		Velasco		Total	%
District	Votes	%	Votes	%	Votes	%	Total	%
1st District	92,369	49.97	91,228	49.35	1,262	0.68	184,859	17.54
2nd District	114,499	64.31	62,480	35.09	1,054	0.59	178,033	16.89
3rd District	144,828	66.86	70,658	32.62	1,124	0.52	216,610	20.55
4th District	141,361	64.52	76,927	35.11	799	0.36	219,087	20.79
5th District	54,405	21.32	199,570	78.19	1,261	0.49	255,236	24.22
TOTAL	547,462	51.95	500,863	47.53	5,500	0.52	1,053,825	100.00
Source: Commission on Elections

=== Provincial Board elections ===
The Iloilo Provincial Board is composed of 13 board members, 10 of whom are elected.

Lakas–CMD tied with Partido Federal ng Pilipinas at three seats each.

Party	Votes	%	Seats	+/–
Lakas–CMD	506,635	34.98	3	+1
Partido Federal ng Pilipinas	361,509	24.96	3	+3
Nacionalista Party	225,147	15.54	2	–2
Liberal Party	103,426	7.14	1	0
Uswag Ilonggo	100,389	6.93	1	New
Reform PH Party	58,242	4.02	0	New
Bunyog Party	15,872	1.10	0	New
Independent	77,299	5.34	0	0
Total	1,448,519	100.00	10	0
Total votes	1,135,709	–		
Registered voters/turnout	1,319,109	86.10		
Source: Commission on Elections

==== 1st District ====
- Municipality: Guimbal, Igbaras, Miagao, Oton, San Joaquin, Tigbauan, Tubungan

Incumbent Board Member Val Serag (Lakas-CMD), who was term-limited, ran for mayor of San Joaquin. Jo Ann Basco-Germinanda (Lakas-CMD), appointed to replace Carmelo Nochete, who served as regional director of DSWD Field Office VI, ran for her first full term as board member and was successfully re-elected.

Lakas-CMD also nominated Rica Jane Garin, daughter of Iloilo 1st District Representative Janette Garin and Miagao Mayor Richard Garin, who won her first term. Former Oton councilor Migs Flores and perennial candidate Elston Saquian also ran for the position of board member, but lost.

2025 Iloilo 1st District Board Member Election
Candidate	Party	Votes	%
Rica Jane Garin	Lakas-CMD	127,454	44.05
Jo Ann Basco-Germinanda (Incumbent)	Lakas-CMD	93,059	32.16
Juan Miguel "Migs" Flores	Independent	53,372	18.45
Elston Saquian	Independent	15,442	5.34
Total		289,327	100.00
Registered voters/turnout		234,519	–
Source: Commission on Elections

===== Per City/Municipality =====
Iloilo 1st District Board Member Election Results Per City/Municipality
City/Municipality	Garin		Basco-Germinanda		Flores		Saquian	
City/Municipality	Votes	%	Votes	%	Votes	%	Votes	%
Guimbal	17,044	49.17	15,526	44.79	1,589	4.58	503	1.45
Igbaras	12,519	50.20	8,389	33.64	2,978	11.94	1,054	4.23
Miagao	21,679	39.06	17,443	31.43	10,562	19.03	5,820	10.49
Oton	22,155	34.73	15,312	24.00	24,328	38.13	2,003	3.14
San Joaquin	19,371	45.56	12,408	29.18	6,764	15.91	3,972	9.34
Tigbauan	25,058	51.09	16,744	34.14	5,795	11.81	1,451	2.96
Tubungan	9,628	51.05	7,237	38.37	1,356	7.19	639	3.39
TOTAL	127,454	44.05	93,059	32.16	53,372	18.45	15,442	5.34
Source: Commission on Elections

==== 2nd District ====
- Municipality: Alimodian, Leganes, Leon, New Lucena, Pavia, San Miguel, Santa Barbara, Zarraga

Incumbent Board Members Rolito Cajilig (PFP) and June Mondejar (PFP) were re-elected unopposed, each securing their third consecutive term.

2025 Iloilo 2nd District Board Member Election
Candidate	Party	Votes	%
June Mondejar (Incumbent)	Partido Federal ng Pilipinas	95,361	54.37
Rolito Cajilig (Incumbent)	Partido Federal ng Pilipinas	80,036	45.63
Total		175,397	100.00
Registered voters/turnout		223,656	–
Source: Commission on Elections

==== 3rd District ====
- Municipality: Badiangan, Bingawan, Cabatuan, Calinog, Janiuay, Lambunao, Maasin, Mina, Pototan

Incumbent Board Member Matt Palabrica (PFP) retired and ran for mayor of Bingawan. Partido Federal ng Pilipinas nominated his brother, incumbent Bingawan Mayor Mark Palabrica, who won his first term. Meanwhile, Incumbent Board Member Jason Gonzales (Liberal) ran for and won his third consecutive term.

Lakas-CMD also nominated Anthony Margarico, son of former Board Member and Janiuay Mayor Ben Margarico, and Pototan Councilor Toto ER Paluay, both of whom lost.

2025 Iloilo 3rd District Board Member Election
Candidate	Party	Votes	%
Mark Palabrica	Partido Federal ng Pilipinas	108,762	37.23
Jason Gonzales (Incumbent)	Liberal Party	103,436	35.40
Anthony Margarico	Lakas-CMD	47,532	16.27
Eugenio Rodrigo "Toto ER" Palu-ay	Lakas-CMD	32,439	11.10
Total		292,169	100.00
Registered voters/turnout		275,733	–
Source: Commission on Elections

===== Per City/Municipality =====
Iloilo 3rd District Board Member Election Results Per City/Municipality
City/Municipality	Palabrica		Gonzales		Margarico		Palu-ay	
City/Municipality	Votes	%	Votes	%	Votes	%	Votes	%
Badiangan	8,277	43.88	6,667	35.34	3,238	17.16	682	3.62
Bingawan	6,848	60.02	3,292	28.85	982	8.61	287	2.52
Cabatuan	16,237	41.06	11,954	30.23	9,494	24.01	1,859	4.70
Calinog	16,130	44.91	14,794	41.19	3,735	10.40	1,254	3.49
Janiuay	14,608	32.69	11,428	25.57	16,305	36.49	2,347	5.25
Lambunao	14,223	29.62	29,340	61.10	3,463	7.21	990	2.06
Maasin	10,747	41.05	10,611	40.53	3,560	13.60	1,265	4.83
Mina	7,291	39.19	6,289	33.80	2,684	14.43	2,340	12.58
Pototan	14,401	29.43	9,051	18.49	4,071	8.32	21,415	43.76
TOTAL	108,762	37.23	103,426	35.40	47,532	16.27	32,439	11.11
Source: Commission on Elections

==== 4th District ====
- City: Passi
- Municipality: Anilao, Banate, Barotac Nuevo, Dingle, Dueñas, Dumangas, San Enrique

Incumbent Board Member Domingo Oso Jr. (Nacionalista), who was term-limited and retired, was replaced by his son, Dominic Paul Oso, who won his first term. Meanwhile, Incumbent Board Member Rolando Distura (Nacionalista) ran for and won his third consecutive term.

Retired Police Lieutenant Colonel Jonathan Pinuela (Reform PH), who previously accused Iloilo 4th District Representative Ferj Biron of harassment while serving as police chief in Dumangas and was later suspended by the Ombudsman, ran for board member but lost. Former Barangay Chairman of Barotac Nuevo and 2022 Iloilo 4th District congressional candidate Antonio Parcon (Bunyog), and Bimboy Dolar (Independent), also ran for the position of board member but lost.

2025 Iloilo 4th District Board Member Election
Candidate	Party	Votes	%
Rolando "Rolly" Distura (Incumbent)	Nacionalista Party	124,834	40.56
Dominic Paul Oso	Nacionalista Party	100,313	32.60
Jonathan Pinuela	Reform PH Party	58,242	18.93
Antonio Parcon	Bunyog Party	15,872	5.16
Felicito "Bimboy" Dolar Jr.	Independent	8,485	2.76
Total		307,746	100.00
Registered voters/turnout		266,462	–
Source: Commission on Elections

===== Per City/Municipality =====
Iloilo 4th District Board Member Election Results Per City/Municipality
City/Municipality	Distura		Oso		Pinuela		Parcon		Dolar	
City/Municipality	Votes	%	Votes	%	Votes	%	Votes	%	Votes	%
Anilao	10,266	43.20	8,583	36.12	3,022	12.72	1,148	4.83	744	3.13
Banate	7,398	28.24	5,290	20.19	11,582	44.21	1,271	4.85	656	2.50
Barotac Nuevo	15,480	31.96	22,808	47.09	4,896	10.11	4,468	9.22	786	1.62
Dingle	13,212	40.42	9,922	30.36	6,888	21.07	1,698	5.20	965	2.95
Dueñas	10,223	39.07	7,524	28.75	6,218	23.76	1,443	5.51	758	2.90
Dumangas	33,630	52.64	16,270	25.47	9,917	15.52	1,999	3.13	2,066	3.23
Passi City	25,239	40.45	22,466	36.01	10,113	16.21	2,678	4.29	1,898	3.04
San Enrique	9,386	38.75	7,450	30.76	5,606	23.15	1,167	4.82	612	2.53
TOTAL	124,834	40.56	100,313	32.60	58,242	18.93	15,872	5.16	8,485	2.76
Source: Commission on Elections

==== 5th District ====
- Municipality: Ajuy, Balasan, Barotac Viejo, Batad, Carles, Concepcion, Estancia, Lemery, San Dionisio, San Rafael, Sara

Incumbent Board Member Carol V Diaz (Aksyon) retired and ran for mayor of Ajuy. Likewise, Incumbent Board Member Binky April Tupas (Lakas-CMD) also retired and ran for Iloilo 5th District Representative. Lakas-CMD nominated her brother-in-law, former Board Member Darl Tupas, along with Carles Councilor Carlo Ong. Tupas won, while Ong lost.

Former Iloilo 5th District Representative and Vice Governor Rolex Suplico (Uswag Ilonggo) also ran and secured a seat. Meanwhile, former Barotac Viejo Mayor Beng Tupas (PFP) likewise ran but lost.

2025 Iloilo 5th District Board Member Election
Candidate	Party	Votes	%
Nielito "Doc Darl" Tupas	Lakas–CMD	118,807	30.95
Rolex Suplico	Uswag Ilonggo	100,389	26.15
John Carlo Ong	Lakas–CMD	87,344	22.75
Niel "Beng" Tupas III	Partido Federal ng Pilipinas	77,350	20.15
Total		383,890	100.00
Registered voters/turnout		318,739	–
Source: Commission on Elections

===== Per City/Municipality =====
Iloilo 5th District Board Member Election Results Per City/Municipality
City/Municipality	Tupas D.		Suplico		Ong		Tupas B.	
City/Municipality	Votes	%	Votes	%	Votes	%	Votes	%
Ajuy	14,604	34.28	10,979	25.77	7,938	18.63	9,085	21.32
Balasan	7,278	28.05	8,141	31.38	6,727	25.93	3,796	14.63
Barotac Viejo	13,634	32.09	6,556	15.43	4,670	10.99	17,631	41.49
Batad	4,917	26.58	6,078	32.85	4,003	21.64	3,502	18.93
Carles	16,426	29.05	11,141	19.71	22,856	40.43	6,113	10.81
Concepcion	12,183	35.10	9,274	26.72	6,597	19.00	6,660	19.19
Estancia	13,765	31.87	11,509	26.65	11,930	27.62	5,988	13.86
Lemery	8,114	30.05	8,363	30.98	4,278	15.85	6,243	23.12
San Dionisio	9,192	30.18	9,854	32.35	5,374	17.64	6,037	19.82
San Rafael	5,001	33.26	3,945	26.24	2,674	17.78	3,417	22.72
Sara	13,693	28.88	14,549	35.34	10,297	21.72	8,878	18.72
TOTAL	118,807	30.95	100,389	26.15	87,344	22.75	77,350	20.15
Source: Commission on Elections

== Congressional elections ==
=== 1st District ===
- Municipality: Guimbal, Igbaras, Miagao, Oton, San Joaquin, Tigbauan, Tubungan

Incumbent Janette Garin of Lakas–CMD ran for a third term. She was previously affiliated with the National Unity Party.

Garin won re-election against former Tubungan mayor Victor Tabaquirao (Partido Demokratiko Pilipino) and Rosendo Langusta (Independent).

2025 Philippine House of Representatives Election in Iloilo's 1st District
Candidate	Party	Votes	%
Janette Garin (Incumbent)	Lakas–CMD	154,031	86.60
Victor Tabaquirao	Partido Demokratiko Pilipino	19,929	11.20
Rosendo Langusta	Independent	3,900	2.19
Total		177,860	100.00
Valid votes		177,860	87.56
Invalid/blank votes		25,275	12.44
Total votes		203,135	100.00
Registered voters/turnout		234,519	86.62
Lakas hold			
Source: Commission on Elections

==== Per City/Municipality ====
2025 Philippine House of Representatives Election in Iloilo's 1st District Results Per City/Municipality
City/Municipality	Garin		Tabaquirao		Langusta	
City/Municipality	Votes	%	Votes	%	Votes	%
Guimbal	18,668	96.55	567	2.93	101	0.52
Igbaras	14,524	88.66	1,613	9.85	244	1.49
Miagao	25,684	78.38	6,269	19.13	817	2.49
Oton	34,234	84.79	4,573	11.33	1,567	3.88
San Joaquin	22,777	91.26	1,592	6.38	588	2.36
Tigbauan	29,023	91.00	2,333	7.31	538	1.69
Tubungan	9,121	75.08	2,982	24.55	45	0.37
TOTAL	154,031	86.60	19,929	11.20	3,900	2.19
Source: Commission on Elections

=== 2nd District ===
- Municipality: Alimodian, Leganes, Leon, New Lucena, Pavia, San Miguel, Santa Barbara, Zarraga

Incumbent Michael Gorriceta of the Nacionalista Party retired.

Gorriceta endorsed his wife, Kathy Gorriceta (Lakas–CMD), who won the election unopposed.

2025 Philippine House of Representatives Election in Iloilo's 2nd District
Candidate	Party	Votes	%
Kathryn Joyce "Kathy" Gorriceta	Lakas–CMD	143,184	100.00
Total		143,184	100.00
Valid votes		143,184	74.12
Invalid/blank votes		50,003	25.88
Total votes		193,187	100.00
Registered voters/turnout		223,656	86.38
Lakas gain from Nacionalista			
Source: Commission on Elections

=== 3rd District ===
- Municipality: Badiangan, Bingawan, Cabatuan, Calinog, Janiuay, Lambunao, Maasin, Mina, Pototan

Incumbent Lorenz Defensor of the National Unity Party ran for a third term.

Defensor won re-election against Thelma Langusta (Independent).

2025 Philippine House of Representatives Election in Iloilo's 3rd District
Candidate	Party	Votes	%
Lorenz "Nonoy" Defensor (Incumbent)	National Unity Party	194,791	98.64
Thelma Langusta	Independent	2,679	1.36
Total		197,470	100.00
Valid votes		197,470	85.51
Invalid/blank votes		33,472	14.49
Total votes		230,942	100.00
Registered voters/turnout		275,733	83.76
NUP hold			
Source: Commission on Elections

==== Per City/Municipality ====
2025 Philippine House of Representatives Election in Iloilo's 3rd District Results Per City/Municipality
City/Municipality	Defensor		Langusta	
City/Municipality	Votes	%	Votes	%
Badiangan	12,181	99.03	119	0.97
Bingawan	7,017	98.79	86	1.21
Cabatuan	27,756	98.55	407	1.45
Calinog	23,818	98.10	462	1.90
Janiuay	29,313	98.47	455	1.53
Lambunao	30,244	98.66	410	1.34
Maasin	17,760	98.95	189	1.05
Mina	12,070	99.13	106	0.87
Pototan	34,632	98.73	445	1.27
TOTAL	194,791	98.64	2,679	1.36
Source: Commission on Elections

=== 4th District ===
- City: Passi
- Municipality: Anilao, Banate, Barotac Nuevo, Dingle, Dueñas, Dumangas, San Enrique

Incumbent Ferjenel Biron of the Nacionalista Party ran for a second term.

Biron won re-election against Charlie Sustento Jr. (Reform PH Party).

2025 Philippine House of Representatives Election in Iloilo's 4th District
Candidate	Party	Votes	%
Ferjenel "Dok Ferj" Biron (Incumbent)	Nacionalista Party	139,202	63.73
Charlie Sustento Jr.	Reform PH Party	79,236	36.27
Total		218,438	100.00
Valid votes		218,438	93.58
Invalid/blank votes		14,981	6.42
Total votes		233,419	100.00
Registered voters/turnout		266,462	87.60
Nacionalista hold			
Source: Commission on Elections

==== Per City/Municipality ====
2025 Philippine House of Representatives Election in Iloilo's 4th District Results Per City/Municipality
City/Municipality	Biron		Sustento	
City/Municipality	Votes	%	Votes	%
Anilao	13,492	82.60	2,843	17.40
Banate	9,175	48.96	9,565	51.04
Barotac Nuevo	26,742	81.12	6,222	18.88
Dingle	13,279	57.47	9,827	42.53
Dueñas	9,382	50.53	9,184	49.47
Dumangas	28,387	66.50	14,298	33.50
Passi City	28,008	59.36	19,179	40.64
San Enrique	10,737	56.95	8,118	43.05
TOTAL	139,202	63.73	79,236	36.27
Source: Commission on Elections

=== 5th District ===
- Municipality: Ajuy, Balasan, Barotac Viejo, Batad, Carles, Concepcion, Estancia, Lemery, San Dionisio, San Rafael, Sara

Term-limited incumbent Raul Tupas of Lakas–CMD ran for vice governor of Iloilo.

Lakas–CMD nominated Tupas' wife, provincial board member Binky April Tupas, who won the election against former representative Niel Tupas Jr. (Nationalist People's Coalition).

2025 Philippine House of Representatives Election in Iloilo's 5th District
Candidate	Party	Votes	%
Binky April Tupas	Lakas–CMD	145,283	56.18
Niel "Junjun" Tupas Jr.	Nationalist People's Coalition	113,313	43.82
Total		258,596	100.00
Valid votes		258,596	94.03
Invalid/blank votes		16,430	5.97
Total votes		275,026	100.00
Registered voters/turnout		318,739	86.29
Lakas hold			
Source: Commission on Elections

==== Per City/Municipality ====
2025 Philippine House of Representatives Election in Iloilo's 5th District Results Per City/Municipality
City/Municipality	Tupas B.		Tupas N.	
City/Municipality	Votes	%	Votes	%
Ajuy	14,566	49.13	15,081	50.87
Balasan	11,568	63.81	6,560	36.19
Barotac Viejo	16,630	61.59	10,373	38.41
Batad	7,145	56.49	5,503	43.51
Carles	18,941	51.05	18,159	48.95
Concepcion	13,747	59.00	9,554	41.00
Estancia	16,931	56.95	12,798	43.05
Lemery	11,503	61.96	7,063	38.04
San Dionisio	11,238	53.08	9,932	46.92
San Rafael	6,053	59.64	4,097	40.36
Sara	16,961	54.44	14,193	45.56
TOTAL	145,283	56.18	113,313	43.82
Source: Commission on Elections

== City and municipal elections ==
=== 1st District ===
- Municipality: Guimbal, Igbaras, Miagao, Oton, San Joaquin, Tigbauan, Tubungan

==== Guimbal ====
Incumbent Mayor Jennifer Garin-Colada of Lakas–CMD ran for a second term. She was previously affiliated with the National Unity Party. Garin-Colada won re-election against Eduardo Gargaritano (Partido Demokratiko Pilipino).

2025 Guimbal Mayoral Election
Candidate	Party	Votes	%
Janette "Jennifer" Garin-Colada (Incumbent)	Lakas–CMD	17,493	90.39
Eduardo Gargaritano	Partido Demokratiko Pilipino	1,859	9.61
Total		19,352	100.00
Valid votes		19,352	92.97
Invalid/blank votes		1,464	7.03
Total votes		20,816	100.00
Registered voters/turnout		25,103	82.92
Lakas hold			
Source: Commission on Elections

Incumbent Vice Mayor Mary Ann Suyao-Lujan of Lakas–CMD did not seek reelection; instead, she ran for Sangguniang Bayan (SB) member. Lakas-CMD nominated term-limited Iloilo Vice Governor Christine "Tingting" Garin, formerly affiliated with the Nacionalista Party, won the election unopposed.

2025 Guimbal Vice Mayoral Election
Candidate	Party	Votes	%
Christine "Tingting" Garin	Lakas–CMD	17,907	100.00
Total		17,907	100.00
Valid votes		17,907	86.03
Invalid/blank votes		2,909	13.97
Total votes		20,816	100.00
Registered voters/turnout		25,103	82.92
Lakas hold			
Source: Commission on Elections

Incumbent Vice Mayor Mary Ann Suyao-Lujan of Lakas-CMD did not seek reelection to the vice mayoralty and instead ran for an SB seat, where she topped the race.

Lakas-CMD nominated incumbent SB Members Reina Paz Alipao, Christy Love Custodio, Bou-Chit Gelvero, Ivy Gequiniana, and Mar Temelo, all of whom sought and won reelection, while independent incumbent Bogs Gegato lost his bid for a second consecutive term. Lakas-CMD swept all eight seats.

Term-limited incumbents Tita Garrucha (National Unity Party) and Fidel Gellangarin (Lakas-CMD) did not seek other positions.

2025 Guimbal Sangguniang Bayan Member Election
Candidate	Party	Votes	%
Mary Ann Suyao-Lujan	Lakas–CMD	15,394	12.38
Reina Paz Alipao (Incumbent)	Lakas–CMD	13,576	10.92
Christy Love Custodio-Margarico (Incumbent)	Lakas–CMD	12,506	10.06
Lemuel Geollegue	Lakas–CMD	11,482	9.23
Marcelino "Bou-Chit" Gelvero Sr. (Incumbent)	Lakas–CMD	10,943	8.80
Ivy Gequiniana (Incumbent)	Lakas–CMD	10,901	8.77
Jo Marie "Mar" Temelo (Incumbent)	Lakas–CMD	10,542	8.48
Lorna Young	Lakas–CMD	10,058	8.09
Nilfa Gellangarin	Independent	9,418	7.57
Gil "Bogs" Gegato (Incumbent)	Independent	7,139	5.74
Ronhel Tan	Independent	6,560	5.28
Danilo Narciso	Partido Demokratiko Pilipino	3,054	2.46
Bryan Rosete	Independent	1,560	1.25
Antonio "Tony" Gelle	Partido Demokratiko Pilipino	1,217	0.98
Total		124,350	100.00
Registered voters/turnout		25,103	–
Source: Commission on Elections

==== Igbaras ====
Incumbent Mayor Juvic Escorpion of Lakas-CMD sought and won a second consecutive term. He faced incumbent three-termer SB member Anne Karmela Eucogco of Reform PH Party.

2025 Igbaras Mayoral Election
Candidate	Party	Votes	%
Vicente "Juvic" Escorpion Jr. (Incumbent)	Lakas–CMD	9,307	52.92
Anne Karmela Eucogco	Reform PH Party	8,280	47.08
Total		17,587	100.00
Valid votes		17,587	97.52
Invalid/blank votes		448	2.48
Total votes		18,035	100.00
Registered voters/turnout		22,105	81.59
Lakas hold			
Source: Commission on Elections

Incumbent Vice Mayor Sherwin Paul Quidato of Lakas-CMD sought for a second term and won the election unopposed.

2025 Igbaras Vice Mayoral Election
Candidate	Party	Votes	%
Sherwin Paul Quidato (Incumbent)	Lakas–CMD	12,923	100.00
Total		12,923	100.00
Valid votes		12,923	71.66
Invalid/blank votes		5,112	28.34
Total votes		18,035	100.00
Registered voters/turnout		22,105	81.59
Lakas hold			
Source: Commission on Elections

Incumbent SB Members Anne Karmela Eucogco and Jose Nilo Graza were term-limited. Eucogco ran for Vice Mayor while Graza did not pursue any other elective positions.

Incumbent SB Members Anthony Autencio, Yen De la Cruz, and Tsipbogrong Eulatic of Lakas-CMD sought reelection and all successfully retained their seats.

Meanwhile, incumbent Independent SB Members Jun Elarmo, Itik Espin, and Toti Espinosa also sought reelection and won.

Former SB Members Vincent Robles and Nene Escanlar of (Lakas-CMD) attempted political comebacks by running for fresh terms but lost.

2025 Igbaras Sangguniang Bayan Member Election
Candidate	Party	Votes	%
Jose Vicente "Itik" Espin Jr. (Incumbent)	Independent	9,804	8.95
Deniamel Yen "Yen" De la Cruz-Famatid (Incumbent)	Lakas–CMD	7,999	7.31
Fatima Ebanen	Reform PH Party	7,807	7.13
Christian Jun Elarmo (Incumbent)	Independent	7,744	7.07
Anthony Autencio (Incumbent)	Lakas–CMD	7,618	6.96
Ferdinand "Kap Bong" Esmejarda	Lakas–CMD	7,593	6.94
Romeo "Toti" Espinosa (Incumbent)	Independent	7,185	6.56
Hermogenes "Tsipbogrong" Eulatic (Incumbent)	Lakas–CMD	7,108	6.49
Ricky Estoce	Independent	6,154	5.62
Panfilo "Doc Pilo" Espiña	Reform PH Party	5,686	5.19
Vincent Robles	Lakas–CMD	5,602	5.12
Armando Emboltorio	Independent	5,490	5.01
Jose Ma. Nelson "Nene" Escanlar	Lakas–CMD	5,207	4.76
Jose Ebalan	Independent	5,000	4.57
John Eric Esteba	Independent	4,803	4.39
Feliciano Esmeralda Jr.	Independent	4,008	3.66
Wilfredo "Engr. Boydel" Delgado	Reform PH Party	2,894	2.64
Antonio Escullar Jr.	Independent	1,786	1.63
Total		109,488	100.00
Registered voters/turnout		22,105	–
Source: Commission on Elections

==== Miagao ====
2025 Miagao Mayoral Election
Candidate	Party	Votes	%
Oscar "Richard" Garin Jr. (Incumbent)	Lakas–CMD	20,193	55.40
Macario "Doc Mac" Napulan	Liberal Party	16,119	44.23
Marlon Paulmanal	Partido Demokratiko Pilipino	135	0.37
Total		36,447	100.00
Valid votes		36,447	96.98
Invalid/blank votes		1,135	3.02
Total votes		37,582	100.00
Registered voters/turnout		42,582	88.26
Lakas hold			
Source: Commission on Elections

2025 Miagao Vice Mayoral Election
Candidate	Party	Votes	%
Ma. Salve "Doc Salve" Napud	Partido Federal ng Pilipinas	19,324	54.62
Carmelo Nochete	Lakas-CMD	16,054	45.38
Total		35,378	100.00
Valid votes		35,378	94.14
Invalid/blank votes		2,204	5.86
Total votes		37,582	100.00
Registered voters/turnout		42,582	88.26
PFP gain from Lakas			
Source: Commission on Elections

2025 Miagao Sangguniang Bayan Member Election
Candidate	Party	Votes	%
Japhet Grace Moleta (Incumbent)	Lakas–CMD	25,145	10.38
Lea Marie Naldoza	Lakas–CMD	20,380	8.41
Richard Esposo (Incumbent)	Partido Federal ng Pilipinas	17,857	7.37
Gemma Nulada	Lakas–CMD	17,806	7.35
Gemma Rei Nismal (Incumbent)	Lakas–CMD	17,772	7.34
Jun Carlu "Doc Carlu" Napulan (Incumbent)	Liberal Party	17,647	7.28
Marlou Niones	Lakas–CMD	15,020	6.20
Jessica "Jeck" Torrecampo	Lakas–CMD	13,945	5.76
Cezar Florece (Incumbent)	Lakas–CMD	13,719	5.66
Aaron Noble (Incumbent)	Lakas–CMD	12,505	5.16
Robert "Junjun" Galvez	Liberal Party	10,522	4.34
Mario Gallego	Liberal Party	9,989	4.12
John Leo Lucero	Independent	9,689	4.00
Severino "Bongbong" Nalumen	Liberal Party	9,585	3.96
Rodolfo "Atty. Nonoy" Legaspi II	Liberal Party	8,707	3.59
Christopher "Kap Tope" Nargatan	Liberal Party	6,625	2.73
Vergil "Babydoc" Flores	Liberal Party	5,268	2.17
Alejandro Naldoza	Independent	3,455	1.43
Nolly Famillaran	Partido Demokratiko Pilipino	3,176	1.31
Jose Rey Palmos	Independent	1,716	0.71
Elias Monsale	Independent	1,272	0.53
Ryan Earl Sedano	Independent	469	0.19
Total		242,269	100.00
Registered voters/turnout		42,582	–
Source: Commission on Elections

==== Oton ====
2025 Oton Mayoral Election
Candidate	Party	Votes	%
Sofronio Fusin Jr. (Incumbent)	Nacionalista Party	34,432	100.00
Total		34,432	100.00
Valid votes		34,432	71.15
Invalid/blank votes		13,964	28.85
Total votes		48,396	100.00
Registered voters/turnout		54,996	88.00
Nacionalista hold			
Source: Commission on Elections

2025 Oton Vice Mayoral Election
Candidate	Party	Votes	%
Jose Neil Olivares (Incumbent)	Nacionalista Party	24,232	51.89
Anna Rena "Ren-Ren" Trespeses	Lakas	22,469	48.11
Total		46,701	100.00
Valid votes		46,701	96.50
Invalid/blank votes		1,695	3.50
Total votes		48,396	100.00
Registered voters/turnout		54,996	88.00
Nacionalista hold			
Source: Commission on Elections

2025 Oton Sangguniang Bayan Member Election
Candidate	Party	Votes	%
Annie Rose Paro	Lakas–CMD	24,430	9.42
Dennis "Bongs" Geroche (Incumbent)	Nacionalista Party	23,857	9.20
Jimmy Olivares (Incumbent)	Nacionalista Party	23,621	9.11
Dell Hosillos	Nacionalista Party	23,084	8.90
Evaristo Miguel "Kap Jun-Jun" Flores Jr.	Lakas–CMD	22,756	8.78
Ma. Lorna Geonigo (Incumbent)	Independent	22,483	8.67
Josephus Ambrosius Renatus "Jaret" Escanlar	Lakas–CMD	21,559	8.32
Rodolfo "Jun-Jun" Alconga Jr. (Incumbent)	Lakas–CMD	20,592	7.94
Vanessa "Kap Vani" Salinas (Incumbent)	Lakas–CMD	20,557	7.93
Larry "Kap Maymay" Alison	Nacionalista Party	20,150	7.77
Antonio Masculino Jr.	Independent	13,606	5.25
Eduardo Lamberto	Independent	9,948	3.84
Joem Malaga	Independent	8,415	3.25
Wilfredo Fuentespina	Independent	4,168	1.61
Total		259,226	100.00
Registered voters/turnout		54,996	–
Source: Commission on Elections

==== San Joaquin ====
2025 San Joaquin Mayoral Election
Candidate	Party	Votes	%
Joe Abad Lazaro Jr.	Liberal Party	15,126	53.33
Marcelo Valentine "Val" Serag	Lakas	13,236	46.67
Total		28,362	100.00
Valid votes		28,362	97.45
Invalid/blank votes		743	2.55
Total votes		29,105	100.00
Registered voters/turnout		32,684	89.05
Liberal gain from Lakas			
Source: Commission on Elections

2025 San Joaquin Vice Mayoral Election
Candidate	Party	Votes	%
Ivy Mae Selibio-Crespo	Lakas-CMD	11,352	41.51
Ronald Sedano	Independent	9,540	34.88
Marilyn "Pangging" Silfavan	Liberal Party	6,155	22.51
Abdon Santocildes	Independent	302	1.10
Total		27,349	100.00
Valid votes		27,349	93.97
Invalid/blank votes		1,756	6.03
Total votes		29,105	100.00
Registered voters/turnout		32,684	89.05
Lakas hold			
Source: Commission on Elections

2025 San Joaquin Sangguniang Bayan Member Election
Candidate	Party	Votes	%
Ma. Luz Sandoy (Incumbent)	Lakas–CMD	15,029	8.54
Rhalyn Erika "Kikay" Sarinas	Lakas–CMD	14,522	8.26
Marvigrace "Taba" Getuya	Liberal Party	11,873	6.75
Garry Secuban	Lakas–CMD	11,292	6.42
Catalino "Tali" Santacera	Lakas–CMD	10,904	6.20
Pedro Joey Seasat	Lakas–CMD	10,320	5.87
Igmedio "Atty Jun" Prado Jr.	Liberal Party	9,800	5.57
Josephine "Nenet" Secondes-Daulo	Lakas–CMD	9,621	5.47
Virgilio "Viyong" Nacion (Incumbent)	Liberal Party	9,172	5.21
George Santocildes	Lakas–CMD	9,128	5.19
Ronnan Cervantes (Incumbent)	Liberal Party	8,491	4.83
Ma. Teresa Santacera	Independent	8,270	4.70
Christopher "Oper" Selibio	Liberal Party	7,316	4.16
Yves Lester Sevilleno	Liberal Party	6,990	3.97
Bhernie Sandig	Independent	6,099	3.47
Reynaldo Jose "Sir Rey" Fermano	Liberal Party	5,718	3.25
Robert Garfil	Independent	3,897	2.22
Tomas Silaya	Independent	3,147	1.79
Perpetua Santisteban	Independent	2,499	1.42
Gloria Sanglap	Independent	2,212	1.26
Tomas Cervantes	Independent	1,897	1.08
Felimon Sanchez	Independent	1,515	0.86
Solomon Sartaguda	Independent	1,420	0.81
Arlita Acevedo	Independent	1,088	0.62
Benjamin Sebuan	Independent	922	0.52
Ordize Jose Siva	Independent	817	0.46
John Salvador Senerado	Independent	750	0.43
Richel Mondragon	Independent	693	0.39
Michael "Mike" Sevilla	Partido Demokratiko Pilipino	509	0.29
Total		175,911	100.00
Registered voters/turnout		32,684	–
Source: Commission on Elections

==== Tigbauan ====
2025 Tigbauan Mayoral Election
Candidate	Party	Votes	%
Virgilio "V Nene" Teruel (Incumbent)	Lakas	19,043	54.58
Dennis Valencia	Independent	15,848	45.42
Total		34,891	100.00
Valid votes		34,891	96.14
Invalid/blank votes		1,399	3.86
Total votes		36,290	100.00
Registered voters/turnout		41,879	86.65
Lakas hold			
Source: Commission on Elections

2025 Tigbauan Vice Mayoral Election
Candidate	Party	Votes	%
Lugen "FLS" Ortilano (Incumbent)	Lakas-CMD	27,327	100.00
Total		27,327	100.00
Valid votes		27,327	75.30
Invalid/blank votes		8,963	24.70
Total votes		36,290	100.00
Registered voters/turnout		41,879	86.65
Lakas hold			
Source: Commission on Elections

2025 Tigbauan Sangguniang Bayan Member Election
Candidate	Party	Votes	%
Pinky Jarina	Independent	25,120	12.25
Gene Rose "Gen" Canaya	Independent	23,070	11.25
Adrian Camposagrado (Incumbent)	Lakas–CMD	18,093	8.82
Joel "Boboy" Sayson (Incumbent)	Lakas–CMD	16,185	7.89
Marlon Teruñez	Lakas–CMD	15,878	7.74
Nora Rose "Ma'am Nora" Tubiano	Lakas–CMD	15,060	7.34
Reynaldo Tumabotabo (Incumbent)	Lakas–CMD	14,718	7.18
Norberto "Norbing" Turalba (Incumbent)	Lakas–CMD	14,554	7.10
Ana Rowena Perera (Incumbent)	Lakas–CMD	13,986	6.82
Jerry Tuares (Incumbent)	Lakas–CMD	10,695	5.22
Ma. Jonna Bee "Bombay" Taasan-Florece	Independent	9,882	4.82
Ariel Bernardo	Independent	7,275	3.55
Jimmy Tulayba Jr	Independent	6,133	2.99
Vizenn Tomesa	Independent	5,402	2.63
Joyce Tapales	Independent	3,266	1.59
Arlee Galaraga	Independent	3,206	1.56
Teddy Tribunal	Independent	1,279	0.62
Jhozymels "Jojo" De la Cruz	Independent	1,261	0.61
Total		205,063	100.00
Registered voters/turnout		41,879	–
Source: Commission on Elections

==== Tubungan ====
2025 Tubungan Mayoral Election
Candidate	Party	Votes	%
Roquito "Rokit" Tacsagon (Incumbent)	Lakas	11,014	94.79
Eglecerio Cardona	Independent	333	2.87
Celerina Talamillo	Independent	272	2.34
Total		11,619	100.00
Valid votes		11,619	89.99
Invalid/blank votes		1,292	10.01
Total votes		12,911	100.00
Registered voters/turnout		15,170	85.11
Lakas hold			
Source: Commission on Elections

2025 Tubungan Vice Mayoral Election
Candidate	Party	Votes	%
Leo Cezar Taypen (Incumbent)	Lakas-CMD	10,451	100.00
Total		10,451	100.00
Valid votes		10,451	80.95
Invalid/blank votes		2,460	19.05
Total votes		12,911	100.00
Registered voters/turnout		15,170	85.11
Lakas hold			
Source: Commission on Elections

2025 Tubungan Sangguniang Bayan Member Election
Candidate	Party	Votes	%
Vicente "Toto Etik" Gargaritano Jr. (Incumbent)	Partido Federal ng Pilipinas	8,108	10.06
Mark Joshua Tacsagon	Lakas–CMD	7,771	9.65
Francisco "Iko" Tacadao (Incumbent)	Lakas–CMD	6,816	8.46
Fretz Anthony "Bobot" Talento	Lakas–CMD	6,278	7.79
Graciano "Nady" Talledo (Incumbent)	Lakas–CMD	6,035	7.49
Armando Tacuyan	Lakas–CMD	5,570	6.91
Francisco "Ike" Gallego Jr.	Lakas–CMD	5,473	6.79
Lorenzo "Isoy" Tanallon Sr.	Independent	4,679	5.81
Rosenie Mestosamente	Independent	4,438	5.51
Domingo Talledo Jr.	Independent	3,994	4.96
Liberty Tabaquirao-Cantomayor	Independent	3,897	4.84
Miriam Tabanda-Macahilo	Independent	3,352	4.16
Job Aranda	Independent	3,088	3.83
Jaime Guerrero	Independent	2,747	3.41
Hilario Tamises	Independent	2,092	2.60
Ernesto Taguibe Jr.	Independent	1,336	1.66
Ruben Escobañez	Independent	1,219	1.51
Tito Garcia	Independent	1,024	1.27
Richard Echalar	Independent	903	1.12
Bienvenido Tanallon	Independent	793	0.98
Pedro Tabingo	Independent	391	0.49
Rhea Mae Cardona	Independent	290	0.36
Ma. Christy Cañeza	Independent	268	0.33
Total		80,562	100.00
Registered voters/turnout		15,170	–
Source: Commission on Elections

=== 2nd District ===
- Municipality: Alimodian, Leganes, Leon, New Lucena, Pavia, San Miguel, Santa Barbara, Zarraga

=== 3rd District ===
- Municipality: Badiangan, Bingawan, Cabatuan, Calinog, Janiuay, Lambunao, Maasin, Mina, Pototan

=== 4th District ===
- City: Passi
- Municipality: Anilao, Banate, Barotac Nuevo, Dingle, Dueñas, Dumangas, San Enrique

=== 5th District ===
- Municipality: Ajuy, Balasan, Barotac Viejo, Batad, Carles, Concepcion, Estancia, Lemery, San Dionisio, San Rafael, Sara
