= Arthur Defensor Jr. =

Filipino politician (born 1969)

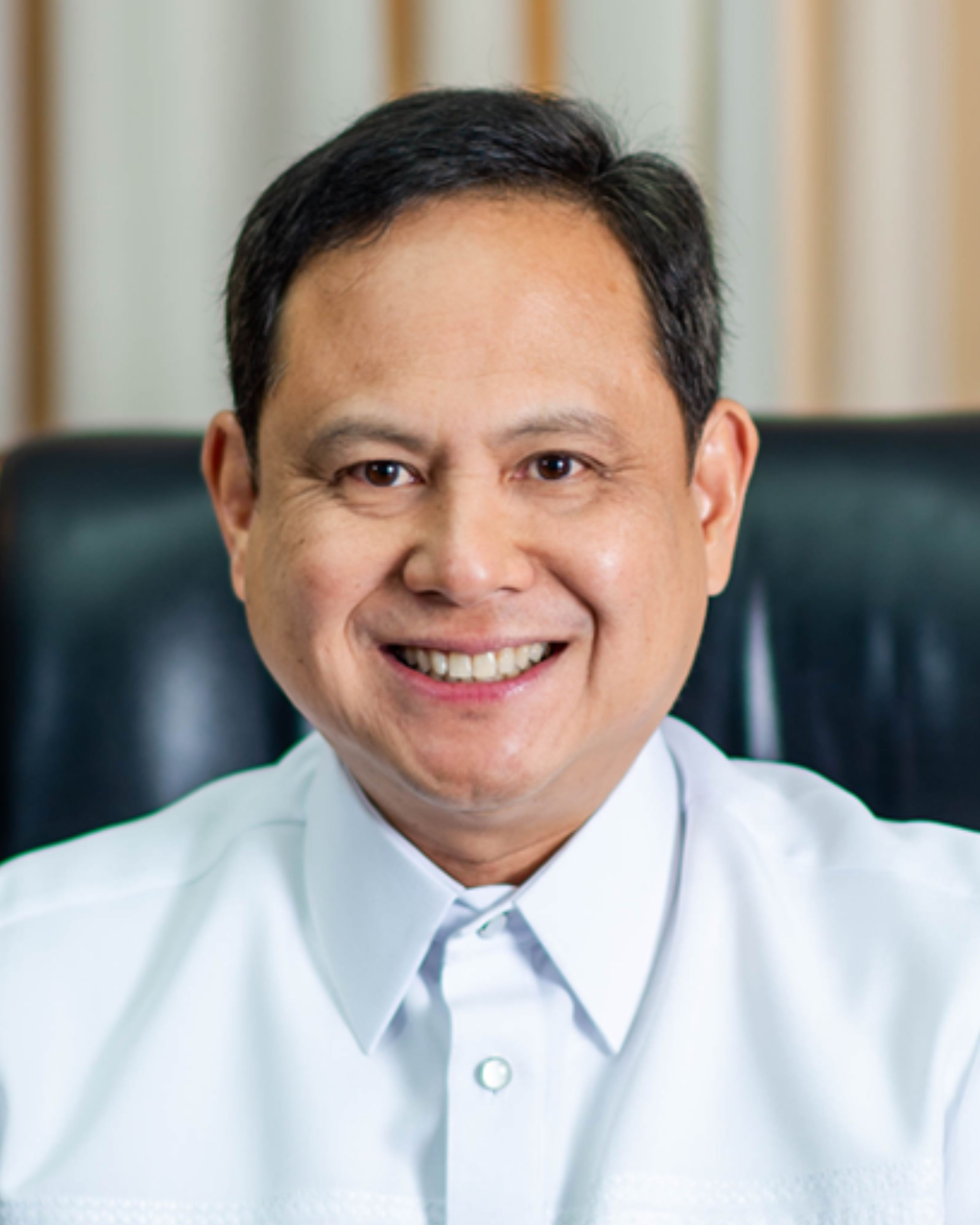
- Defensor in 2021

32nd Governor of Iloilo
- Incumbent
- Assumed office June 30, 2019
- Vice Governor: Christine S. Garin (2019–2025); Nathalie Ann F. Debuque (since 2025)
- Preceded by: Arthur Defensor Sr.

Member of the Philippine House of Representatives from Iloilo's 3rd district
- In office June 30, 2010 – June 30, 2019
- Preceded by: Arthur Defensor Sr.
- Succeeded by: Lorenz Defensor

Member of the Iloilo Provincial Board from the 3rd district
- In office June 30, 2007 – June 30, 2010

Personal details
- Born: Arthur Rivera Defensor Jr. October 8, 1969 (age 57) Iloilo City, Philippines
- Party: PFP (2023–present); Uswag Ilonggo (2021–present) (party-list)
- Other political affiliations: NUP (2021–2023); PDP–Laban (2018–2021); Liberal (2012–2018); Lakas (2007–2012)
- Relations: Arthur Defensor Sr. (father); Cosette Rivera (mother)
- Relatives: Lorenz Defensor (brother); Mike Defensor (second cousin)
- Education: University of the Philippines Diliman (B.A.); Ateneo de Manila University (LL.B)
- Occupation: Lawyer, Politician

Arthur "Toto" Rivera Defensor Jr. (born October 8, 1969) is a Filipino lawyer and politician who has served as the 32nd governor of Iloilo since 2019. He previously served as the representative for Iloilo's third district from 2010 to 2019 and represented the district in the Iloilo Provincial Board from 2007 to 2010.

Defensor Jr. is the son of the former governor and congressman Arthur Defensor Sr., and a nephew of the late former senator Miriam Defensor–Santiago.

== Electoral history ==
Electoral history of Arthur Defensor Jr.
Year	Office	Party		Votes received				Result
Year	Office	Local	National	Total	%	P.	Swing	Result
2007	Board Member (Iloilo–3rd)	—N/a	Lakas	75,152	—N/a	1st	—N/a	Won
2010	Representative (Iloilo–3rd)	—N/a	Lakas	89,960	55.59%	1st	—N/a	Won
2013	Representative (Iloilo–3rd)	—N/a	Liberal	96,514	71.87%	1st	—N/a	Won
2016	Representative (Iloilo–3rd)	—N/a	Liberal	148,941	100.00%	1st	—N/a	Unopposed
2019	Governor of Iloilo	—N/a	PDP–Laban	479,081	54.40%	1st	—N/a	Won
2022	Governor of Iloilo	—N/a	NUP	891,980	97.18%	1st	—N/a	Won
2025	Governor of Iloilo	Uswag Ilonggo	PFP	811,746	100.00%	1st	—N/a	Unopposed

Political offices
Preceded by Arthur Defensor Sr.	Governor of Iloilo; 2019–present	Incumbent
House of Representatives of the Philippines
Preceded by Arthur Defensor Sr.	Member of the House of Representatives from Iloilo's 3rd district 2010–2019	Succeeded by Lorenz Defensor
