= Governor of Iloilo =

Local chief executive

- Gobernador ng Lalawigan ng Iloilo
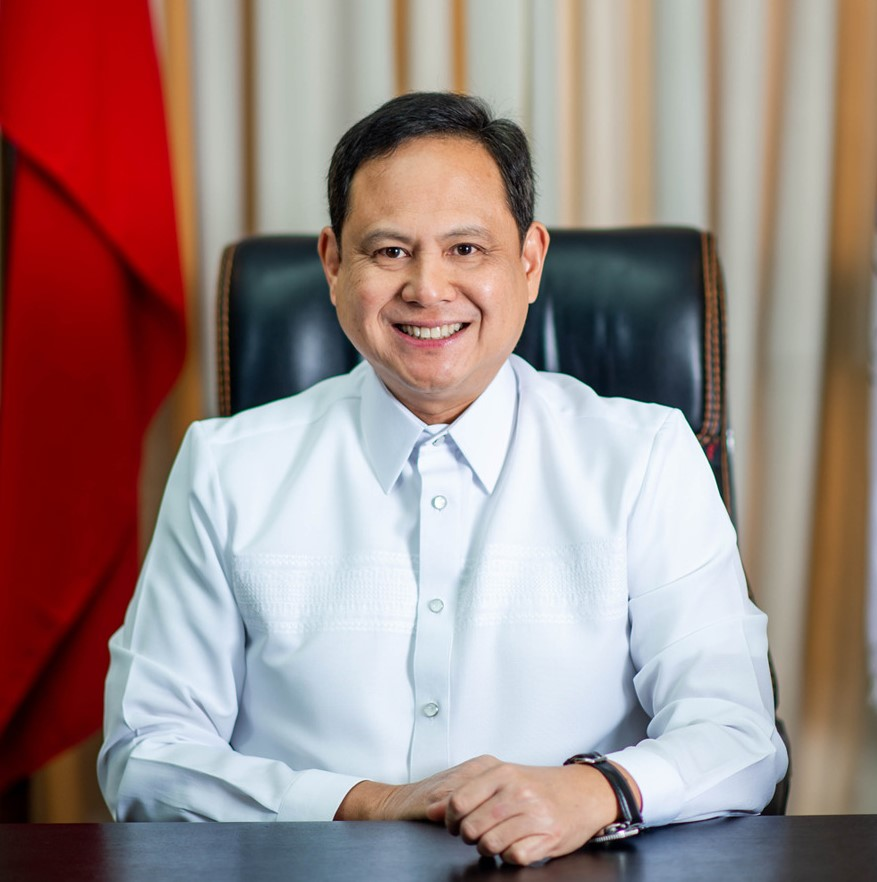
- Incumbent; Arthur Defensor Jr. since June 30, 2019
- Style: The Honorable; His Excellency (formerly, Spanish era)
- Seat: Iloilo Provincial Capitol
- Term length: 3 years, renewable for 3 consecutive terms
- Inaugural holder: Diego de la Correa (Spanish administration); Martin Delgado (Civil Government)
- Formation: 1634 (start of the Spanish administration); 1901 (start of the Civil Government by virtue of Philippine Commission Provincial Government Act)
- Deputy: Vice-Governor
- Website: Official Website of the Provincial Government of Iloilo

The governor of Iloilo (Filipino: Punong Lalawigan ng Iloilo) is the local chief executive of the Philippine province of Iloilo. The governor holds office at the Iloilo Provincial Capitol (Spanish: Casa Real de Iloilo) located at Bonifacio Drive, Iloilo City. Like all local government heads in the Philippines, the governor is elected via popular vote, and may not be elected for a fourth consecutive term (although the former governor may return to office after an interval of one term). In case of death, resignation or incapacity, the vice governor becomes the governor. Along with the governors of Aklan, Antique, Capiz, and Guimaras, he sits in the Regional Development Council of the Western Visayas Region.

The current governor is Arthur Defensor Jr. who took the seat for the first time starting July 1, 2019, replacing his father Arthur Defensor Sr. who completed the full three terms as provincial governor.

== History ==
The first Alcalde-Mayor (present-day governor) of Iloilo province to be appointed by the Spanish monarch was Diego de la Correa who held this position from 1634 to 1636. In the early years of Spanish settlement, only a handful of towns has been established. In 1565, the Legazpi expedition which include Mateo del Saz, the maestre de campo (ship commander), Juan de la Isla and Father Martin de Rada exploring the islands in search for food reached the northeastern portion of Panay island. Father Martin de Rada founded Araut (present-day Dumangas) in the same year 1565 becoming the oldest town in Iloilo and built a small chapel there. A Spanish settlement was established in Ogtong (present day Oton) and made the pueblo of the province in 1570. Due to the frequent raids of the Moro pirates from Mindanao, Dutch, and English buccaneers posed a threat to Ogtong, the capital of the province was transferred to La Villa Rica de Arevalo in 1581. It then becomes the seat of Spanish government of the whole of Iloilo, Panay (Capiz, Aklan and Antique), Negros, Guimaras, Cuyu-Palawan, Caluya, Romblon, and Boracay as Miguel Loarca wrote. Other towns established at these period were Pototan, Sibucao (now Passi City) and Dingle, Laglag (now Dueñas), Salog (now Jaro, Iloilo City), Guimbal (1703), Miagao (1716), Leon (1730), Cabatuan (1733), Alimodian (1754), Igbaras (1761), Janiuay (1769), Tubungan (1768), Santa Barbara and Maasin are among the first group of villages that were given a pueblo (town hood) status.

== Provincial Capitol ==
Iloilo provincial capitol building

The old Iloilo Provincial Capitol (Spanish: Casa Real de Iloilo) was the office of the provincial government and official residence of the governor since 1849 with the original structure made out of wood and stone. The new modern Iloilo Provincial Capitol was constructed just behind the old provincial capitol and was completed in 2006. It was designed by architect Guillermo Hisancha. The old provincial capitol has been renovated and restored to its former glory and is now being used as a lobby and reception area for visiting guests and dignitaries. In front of the capitol stands the Arroyo Fountain built in 1928 in honor of Senator Jose Maria Arroyo from Molo, Iloilo City who sponsored a bill creating the Iloilo Metropolitan Water Works. The fountain also serves as the Kilometer Zero or a point of reference in measuring distances in the city and province of Iloilo and also to various points and destinations in Panay Island from Iloilo City.

== List of governors ==
=== Spanish alcalde-mayores ===
After the Spanish settlement was first established in 1570, towns were settled, established and were granted town hood status. By this time, the Spanish government appoints an alcalde mayor to govern the provincial government and surrounding jurisdictions.

| Name | Term of office |
|---|---|
| Diego de la Correa | 1634–1636 |
| Pedro Alarcon | 1637–1639 |
| Pedro de Leon | 1640–1642 |
| Felipe Casiano | 1643–1646 |
| Juan Mendoza | 1647–1649 |
| Felipe Peñalosa | 1650–1653 |
| Jose Cordero | 1654–1657 |
| Pedro Bobaella | 1658–1661 |
| Pedro Velasco | 1662–1664 |
| Jose Briones | 1665–1666 |
| Sebastian de Villas | 1667–1668 |
| Jose de Robles | 1669–1670 |
| Francisco Surrilla | 1671–1672 |
| Miguel Rendon | 1673–1674 |
| Alonzo Piralba | 1675–1676 |
| Nicolas de Pamplona | 1677–1678 |
| Miguel Rindon Livar | 1679–1680 |
| Juan de Moreno | 1681–1682 |
| Martin Gonzales | 1683–1684 |
| Manuel Sarmiento | 1685–1686 |
| Nicolas Perez | 1687–1688 |
| Diego Quiñonez | 1689–1690 |
| Sebastian de Via | 1691 |
| Diego Vargas | 1691–1692 |
| Luis Camacho | 1694–1696 |
| Juan Carion | 1697–1698 |
| Juan Maldonado | 1699–1700 |
| Juan Parado | 1701–1702 |
| Antonio Tarosa | 1703–1704 |
| Juan Esquera | 1705–1706 |
| Pedro Avendano | 1707 |
| Nicolas de Colina | 1708–1709 |
| Juan Jurado | 1710–1711 |
| Gaspar Sanches | 1712–1713 |
| Atancio de Gubgura | 1714–1715 |
| Pedro Lucena | 1716–1717 |
| Felipe Arevalo | 1718–1719 |
| Pedro Basadas Perez | 1727 |
| Andres Melenday | 1728–1730 |
| Francisco Sanguines | 1731–1733 |
| Luis de la Torre | 1734–1737 |
| Felipe Espino | 1738–1739 |
| Manuel de Dozal | 1740–1741 |
| Francisco Valladores | 1742–1745 |
| Francisco Oscotes | 1746–1748 |
| Ignacio Marquez | 1749–1751 |
| Antonio de Arguelles | 1752–1754 |
| Jose de Ocampo | 1770–1771 |
| Manuel de Mendio | 1772–1773 |
| Santiago Salavaria | 1775–1776 |
| Felipe Almoranas | 1777–1779 |
| Francisco Viera | 1780–1782 |
| Santiago Salavaria | 1783–1786 |
| Juan Suarez | 1787 |
| Francisco Bayot | 1788–1795 |
| Jose Mijares | 1796–1801 |
| Damian Novales | 1802–1804 |
| Froilan Aguerre | 1805–1808 |
| Manuel Canay | 1818–1819 |
| Miguel Calderon | 1820–1822 |
| Joaquin Cemina | 1823–1825 |
| Manuel Rodriguez | 1826–1828 |
| Manuel Guillen | 1829–1834 |
| Ambrosio del Callo | 1835–1841 |
| Felipe Combe | 1846–1852 |
| Pedro Zarraga | 1853–1855 |
| Miguel Arila | 1856–1860 |
| Emilio Carles | 1861 |
| Jose Maria Carles | 1862–1867 |
| Anastacio de la Peña | 1868 |
| Manuel Iznart | 1868–1869 |
| Eduardo Caballero | 1870 |
| Fernando Rojas | 1871 |
| Enrique Fajardo | 1872–1879 |
| Camilo Millan | 1880–1881 |
| Miguel Aguilar | 1882–1883 |
| Luis Zariaga | 1884 |
| Luis Pratt | 1885 |
| Pedro Montero | 1889 |
| Miguel Blanco | 1890 |
| Nicolas Jaramillo | 1891 |
| Jose Gramaren | 1892 |
| Francisco de Castilla | 1892–1896 |
| Salvador Viana | 1896–1898 |
| Ricardo Monet | 1898 |

=== Insular Government and Commonwealth governors ===
As the last Spanish politico-military governor (alcalde-mayor) of Iloilo province, Ricardo Monet who served during the last remaining months of 1898 appointed Martin Delgado as captain and commander of the 125-strong voluntarios in Sta. Barbara.

On August 13, 1898, the United States had already bought Manila, Philippines and agreed to spare Iloilo to Spain. Negotiations between the United States and Spain was finished. They made a mock drama on May 10, 1898, that an American vessel will fire a Spanish ship on Manila Bay then they will surrender to America not to a loose platoon of Emilio Aguinaldo in Intramuros. The Americans occupied Manila and raised their flag in Intramuros. Spain's dream is to establish a Spanish kingdom in Iloilo its loyal and devoted province and totally relinquish its right in the entire Philippines.

Gen. Pablo Araneta appointed Martin Delgado as "General en Jefe de los Tropas del Ejercito Libertador de Visayas y Governador Politico-Militar". On October 28, 1898, Delgado marched into Santa Barbara and took control of the municipal building.

Meanwhile, Spanish governor-general Diego de los Ríos left Manila and sailed to Iloilo and established the last Spanish capital in the Orient in Iloilo City. General de los Rios asked Spain to grant some reforms demanded by the representative citizens of Iloilo. He issued in Iloilo a proclamation to the people of the Visayas calling on them to establish a "Council of Reforms" to be made up of 24 leading citizens, 12 of whom would be selected by popular vote, another 12 to be appointed by the general himself.

General de los Rios was obviously sincere in bringing about the reforms people asked for. The granted reforms, however, satisfied only a few ilustrado leaders. Things did not turn out the way it should be. There was widespread oppositions of their offer. The flame of rebellion already swept Iloilo towns, Panay and Negros under Comite Conspirador. Their swift decision is to forego more battle and to peacefully grant sovereignty to Iloilo and to vacate the place and let Americans finished the job. If Ilonggos would have remained loyal to Spain, it would have not encountered the canons of the Americans.

On February 6, 1901, several days after the passage of the Municipal Code, the Philippine Commission passed the Act No. 83 or the Provincial Government Act. It states that every province shall have elected provincial governor. Election is also to be held to also elect a provincial secretary, a provincial treasurer, a provincial supervisor and a provincial fiscal.

On February 2, 1901, during the fiesta celebration of Jaro, General Delgado weary of war and poorly armed formally surrendered in Jaro to the American military governor Edmund Rice. Many of the rebel leaders surrendered.

He was recognized by the Americans as "the ablest leader" on the island. Delgado was appointed as the first governor of Iloilo province upon the establishment of the civil government on April 11, 1901. Jovito Yusay was given the provincial government secretary with a yearly stipend of $1,800 gold. Quintin Salas and his chief of staff. Lt. Col. Francisco Jalandoni were the last to lay down their arms on October 4, 1901. Here are the governors of the province during the American Commonwealth Period.

| No. | Portrait | Name | Term of office | |
| No. | Portrait | Name | Start | End |
|---|---|---|---|---|
| 1 | | Martín Teófilo Delgado | 1901 | 1904 |
| 2 | | Raymundo Melliza | 1904 | 1906 |
| 3 | | Benito Lopez | 1906 | 1908 |
| 4 | | Ruperto Montinola | 1908 | 1912 |
| 5 | | Adriano Hernández | 1912 | 1914 |
| 6 | | Amando Avanceña | 1914 | 1916 |
| 7 | | Gregorio Yulo | 1917 | 1922 |
| 8 | | Ruperto Montinola | 1922 | 1925 |
| 9 | | Jose Ledesma | 1925 | 1927 |
| 10 | | Jose Lopez-Vito | 1927 | 1928 |
| 11 | | Mariano Pidal Arroyo | 1928 | 1929 |
| 12 | | Alejo Aquino | 1929 | 1931 |
| 13 | | Jose Regalado Yulo | 1931 | 1934 |
| 14 | | Timoteo Consing Sr. | 1934 | 1937 |
| 15 | | Tomás Confesor | 1938 | 1941 |
| 16 | | Oscar Ledesma | 1941 | 1942 |

=== World War II governors ===
These were the provincial governors of Iloilo during World War II.

| No. | Portrait | Name | Term of office | | Party |
| No. | Portrait | Name | Start | End | Party |
|---|---|---|---|---|---|
| 17 | | Fermin Caram Sr. | 1942 | 1945 | KALIBAPI |
| 18 | | Tomás Confesor | 1942 | 1945 | Nacionalista |

=== Post-war to present governors ===
These are the governors of the province after the war up to the present.

| No. | Portrait | Name | Term of office | | Party | Election | Vice Governor |
| No. | Portrait | Name | Start | End | Party | Election | Vice Governor |
|---|---|---|---|---|---|---|---|
| 19 | | Patricio Confesor | 1945 | 1945 | Nacionalista | — | None |
| 20 | | Jose Ledesma | 1945 | 1945 | Nacionalista | — | None |
| 21 | | Tomás Vargas | 1946 | 1948 | Liberal | — | None |
| 22 | | Mariano Peñaflorida | 1948 | 1959 | Nacionalista | 1947 | None |
| 22 | | Mariano Peñaflorida | 1948 | 1959 | Nacionalista | 1951 | None |
| 22 | | Mariano Peñaflorida | 1948 | 1959 | Nacionalista | 1955 | None |
| 23 | | Jose Zulueta | January 1, 1960 | December 31, 1963 | Nacionalista | 1959 | Guardalino Mosqueda |
| 24 | | Rafael Palmares | January 1, 1964 | December 31, 1969 | Nacionalista | 1963 | Conrado Norada |
| 24 | | Rafael Palmares | January 1, 1964 | December 31, 1969 | Nacionalista | 1967 | Conrado Norada |
| 24 | | Rafael Palmares | January 1, 1964 | December 31, 1969 | Nacionalista | 1967 | Fortunato Padilla |
| 25 | | Conrado Norada | December 31, 1969 | Feb 26, 1986 | Nacionalista | 1971 | Fortunato Padilla |
| 25 | | Conrado Norada | December 31, 1969 | Feb 26, 1986 | KBL | — | Fortunato Padilla |
| 25 | | Conrado Norada | December 31, 1969 | Feb 26, 1986 | KBL | 1981 | Ramon Duremdes |
| 26 | | Licurgo Tirador | May 8, 1986 | March 31, 1987 | Liberal | — | Carlos Lopez Jr. |
| 26 | | Licurgo Tirador | May 8, 1986 | March 31, 1987 | Liberal | — | Simplicio Griño |
| 27 | | Simplicio Griño | April 9, 1987 | March 1992 | Unknown | — | Ramon Lopez Jr. |
| 27 | | Simplicio Griño | April 9, 1987 | March 1992 | Unknown | 1988 | Ramon Duremdes |
| 27 | | Simplicio Griño | April 9, 1987 | March 1992 | Unknown | 1988 | Robert Maroma |
| 28 | | Feliciano Marañon | April 1992 | June 30, 1992 | Unknown | — | Ramon Duremdes |
| 29 | | Arthur Defensor Sr. | June 30, 1992 | June 30, 2001 | Lakas | 1992 | Robert Maroma |
| 29 | | Arthur Defensor Sr. | June 30, 1992 | June 30, 2001 | Lakas | 1995 | Demetrio Sonza |
| 29 | | Arthur Defensor Sr. | June 30, 1992 | June 30, 2001 | Lakas | 1998 | Demetrio Sonza |
| 30 | | Niel Tupas Sr. | June 30, 2001 | June 30, 2010 | LDP | 2001 | Roberto Armada |
| 30 | | Niel Tupas Sr. | June 30, 2001 | June 30, 2010 | Liberal | 2001 | Roberto Armada |
| 30 | | Niel Tupas Sr. | June 30, 2001 | June 30, 2010 | Liberal | 2004 | Roberto Armada |
| 30 | | Niel Tupas Sr. | June 30, 2001 | June 30, 2010 | Liberal | 2007 | Rolex Suplico |
| 31 | | Arthur Defensor Sr. | June 30, 2010 | June 30, 2019 | Lakas | 2010 | Oscar Garin Jr. |
| 31 | | Arthur Defensor Sr. | June 30, 2010 | June 30, 2019 | Liberal | 2010 | Oscar Garin Jr. |
| 31 | | Arthur Defensor Sr. | June 30, 2010 | June 30, 2019 | Liberal | 2013 | Raul Tupas |
| 31 | | Arthur Defensor Sr. | June 30, 2010 | June 30, 2019 | PDP–Laban | 2016 | Christine Garin |
| 32 | | Arthur Defensor Jr. | June 30, 2019 | Incumbent | PDP–Laban | 2019 | Christine Garin |
| 32 | | Arthur Defensor Jr. | June 30, 2019 | Incumbent | NUP | 2019 | Christine Garin |
| 32 | | Arthur Defensor Jr. | June 30, 2019 | Incumbent | NUP | 2022 | Christine Garin |
| 32 | | Arthur Defensor Jr. | June 30, 2019 | Incumbent | PFP | 2022 | Christine Garin |
| 32 | | Arthur Defensor Jr. | June 30, 2019 | Incumbent | PFP | 2025 | Nathalie Ann Debuque |

== See also ==
- List of vice governors of Iloilo
