= Arthur Defensor Sr. =

Filipino politician (born 1941)

Arthur Doligosa Defensor Sr.
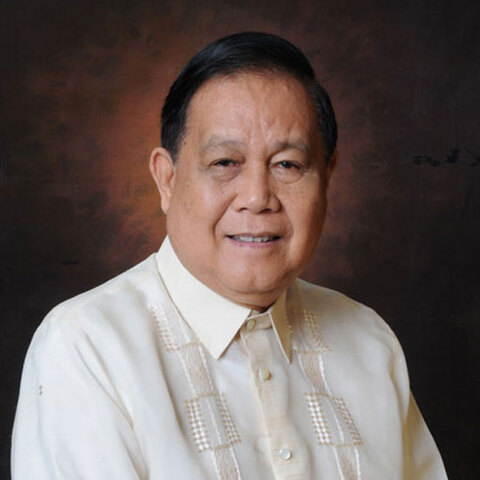
- Official portrait, 2010

29th and 31st Governor of Iloilo
- In office June 30, 2010 – June 30, 2019
- Vice Governor: Oscar "Richard" S. Garin Jr. (2010–2013); Raul "Boboy" C. Tupas (2013–2016); Christine S. Garin (2016–2019)
- Preceded by: Niel Tupas Sr.
- Succeeded by: Arthur Defensor Jr.
- In office June 30, 1992 – June 30, 2001
- Vice Governor: Robert Maroma (1992–1995); Demetrio Sonza (1995–2001)
- Preceded by: Simplicio Griño
- Succeeded by: Niel Tupas Sr.

Member of the Philippine House of Representatives from Iloilo's 3rd congressional district
- In office June 30, 2001 – June 30, 2010
- Preceded by: Manuel Parcon
- Succeeded by: Arthur Defensor Jr.

Personal details
- Born: Arthur Doligosa Defensor; December 25, 1941 (age 84) Dumangas, Iloilo, Commonwealth of the Philippines
- Party: Independent (2019–present)
- Other political affiliations: PDP–Laban (2016–2019); Liberal (2012–2016); Lakas (1991–2012); UNIDO (until 1988)
- Spouse: Cosette Rivera Defensor
- Children: 3, including Arthur Jr., and Lorenz
- Relatives: Miriam Defensor Santiago (cousin)
- Education: University of the Philippines Diliman

Arthur "Art" Doligosa Defensor Sr. (born December 25, 1941) is a Filipino politician and a statesman who served as the governor of Iloilo from 1992 until 2001, and again from 2010 until 2019. He also served as Representative of the 3rd District of Iloilo from 2001 to 2010. He was the Majority Leader of the 14th Congress of the Philippines. He is currently a member of the PDP–Laban. He is married to Cosette Rivera Defensor.

== Early life and education ==
Arthur Doligosa Defensor was born on December 25, 1941, to Santiago A. Defensor and Lourdes P. Doligosa, Both of whom were public school teachers.

He graduated with honors from Mina Elementary School, as well as University of the Philippines High School in Iloilo. He obtained his Associate in Arts degree from the University of the Philippines, Iloilo City in 1959 and his Bachelor of Laws degree from the University of the Philippines Diliman, Quezon City, in 1963.

A bemedalled orator and debater, Defensor is a recipient of various awards, among which are the Most Outstanding Alumnus in Public Service (Centennial Award) from the UP in the Visayas, and the Benigno S. Aquino Jr. Fellowship for Professional Development. He was cited four times as the Most Distinguished Alumnus of the Iloilo National High School

He taught at the Central Philippine University College of Law. In 2014, he was conferred the degree of Doctor of Public Administration (D.P.A.), honoris causa during 87th Commencement Exercises of the university.

== Political career ==
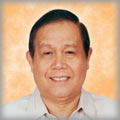
Official portrait, 2007

Governor Arthur D. Defensor Sr. is the only chief executive of the province of Iloilo who got elected six times in the office, a manifestation of the overwhelming support of the people of his leadership. He was first elected in 1992, re-elected in 1995, and in 1998. After serving nine years as Congressman, he was again elected governor in 2010 and re-elected in 2013 and in 2016.

He has not been subject to accusations of wrongdoing or misconduct during his political career. Moreover, he has received a number of awards and citations for his public service.

A brilliant lawyer, Defensor became the first Mayor of his hometown, Mina, at the young age of 26. When martial law was declared in 1972, he chose to concentrate on his law practice, becoming one of the most sought-after lawyers in the City and province of Iloilo.

In 1984, he ran and won as an opposition Assemblyman in the Batasan Pambansa where he proved himself to be a champion of freedom and democracy. He became a leading critic of the dictatorship of Ferdinand Marcos, earning for him the admiration of his province mates.

In 1986, after the People Power Revolution, he was appointed by President Corazon C. Aquino as Undersecretary of the Department of Education, Culture, and Sports. In 1989, he was appointed Commissioner of the Presidential Commission on Good Government (PCGG).

The call to serve his kasimanwas was too strong for him to resist. He ran and won as Governor of the province of Iloilo in 1992, a position he held for nine years. As chief executive, he gave top priority to reforestation, agricultural productivity programs, and infrastructure development.

He worked towards the realization of the Iloilo International Airport, obtaining funding from the Japan International Cooperation Agency (JICA). The construction of the new Iloilo Provincial Capitol also started during his term and came to represent his legacy to his constituents.

In 2001, after serving three consecutive terms as Governor of Iloilo, he ran and won a seat in the House of Representatives, representing the Third Congressional District of Iloilo. He was re-elected in 2004, and then again in 2007.

During the 12th Congress (2001–2004), he was elected Assistant Majority Leader. He also served as vice-chairman of the Committee on Basic Education and Culture. He authored or co-authored 110 House Bills, some of which have been enacted into law. These include the Anti-Money Laundering Law and the Overseas Absentee Voting Law.

In the 13th Congress (2004–2007), he was elected Senior Deputy Majority Leader and Chairman of the Committee on Good Government. He was, likewise, a member of all standing committees. This time, he authored or co-authored 130 House Bills, including the law prohibiting the imposition of the death penalty in the Philippines.

He was the House Majority Leader of the 14th Congress (2007–2010) and Chairman of the Committee on Rules where he authored 66 bills and co-authored 121 bills. He steered into passage a number of bills considered as landmark legislation and bills of national significance and import.

In 2010, he returned to the Capitol to again serve the people of the province of Iloilo as governor under the platform of "Reform and Change" where he introduced measures that ensured transparency and honest governance.

He initiated the Procurement Reform Program that made the Iloilo Provincial Government's procurement process competitive and transparent, resulting in millions of pesos in savings and putting in place an efficient and effective system of acquisition of goods and services.

In 2013, the Government of Canada and the Presidential Commission on Women cited the province of Iloilo as the "Most Outstanding Local Government Unit in Women Economic Empowerment Governance" because of its exemplary gender program and its effective implementation of the Gender-Responsive Economic Actions for Transformation (GREAT) Women Project that aims to promote and support microenterprises for women.

This initiative earned for the province of Iloilo a number of recognitions. In 2011, the Department of the Interior and Local Government (DILG) awarded the province of Iloilo the "Seal of Good Housekeeping" in recognition of its exemplary performance in governance, transparency and accountability.

Defensor also made the province of Iloilo a consistent winner in the Annual DILG Excellence in Local Governance (EXCELL) Awards, winning major awards since 2011 and was capped by being cited as the Most Outstanding Local Government Unit, Provincial Category, in 2015.

Also in 2015, the DILG also conferred the province of Iloilo with the "Seal of Good Local Governance Award" which allowed it to access the P7-Million Performance Challenge Fund of the department. Last year (2016), the province of Iloilo was likewise conferred with the "Seal of Good Local Governance Award" for the third time.

In 2016, Defensor was elevated into the Hall of Fame for winning in three consecutive years the Most Outstanding Provincial Governor of the Philippines in the field of Social Services conferred by the Association of Social Welfare and Development Officers of the Philippines, Inc.

Governor Defensor's flagship environment program, Action for Regreening and Transformation for Climate Change Adaptation (ART for CCA), which aims to plant millions of trees, has gained widespread support from various sectors, and was also cited by the Department of the Environment and Natural Resources (DENR) for its great contribution to the National Greening Program.

His campaign to protect and preserve the Visayan Sea, the country's richest fishing ground, earned for the governor an Award of Recognition from the International Network for Environmental Compliance and Enforcement (INECE), a global network of environmental compliance and enforcement practitioners based in Washington D.C., United States of America.

On June 29, 2016, he received the Kalikasan Award from the DENR "for his exemplary and dauntless commitment to champion environmental governance, protection and rehabilitation in the Province of Iloilo."

Governor Defensor's other advocacies include support for education, water and sanitation services, public health and hospital enhancement, job generation, local economic development, cultural heritage conservation and tourism development, among others.

On October 26, 2014, he was conferred the degree of Doctor of Public Administration (D.P.A.), honoriscausa by Central Philippine University during its 87th Commencement Exercises.

He also received the Paul Harris Fellow, the highest award given by The Rotary Foundation of the Rotary Club International, as well as the Pinoy Icon -General Emilio Aguinaldo Award for Government Service from the Junior Chamber International (JCI).

== Personal life ==
Defensor Sr. is married to Cosette Rivera, née Rivera. They have three children – Arlette, Arthur Jr., and Lorenz – and eight grandchildren.

Arlette is married to Eric Pilapil, the Vice President for Legal and Corporate Secretary of Stradcom Corporation.

Arthur Jr., a lawyer, is the incumbent governor of Iloilo and previously represented the Third (3rd) Congressional District of Iloilo. He is married to Michelle Camacho.

Lorenz, the youngest child, is also a lawyer and now the representative of the Third (3rd) Congressional District of Iloilo. He is married to Vaneza Ungson, also a lawyer.

Defensor Sr. is also a cousin of the late former Senator Miriam Defensor-Santiago.

Preceded by Manuel Parcon	Representative, 3rd District of Iloilo; 2001–2010	Succeeded by Arthur Defensor Jr.
