= Iloilo Provincial Board =

Legislative body of the province of Iloilo, Philippines

Iloilo Provincial Board Sangguniang Panlalawigan ng Iloilo
- 15th Sangguniang Panlalawigan

Type
- Type: Unicameral
- Term limits: 3 consecutive terms (9 years)

Leadership
- Presiding Officer: Nathalie Ann F. Debuque, PFP since June 30, 2025
- Floor Leader: Rolex T. Suplico, Uswag since July 8, 2025

Structure
- Seats: 13 board members 1 ex officio presiding officer
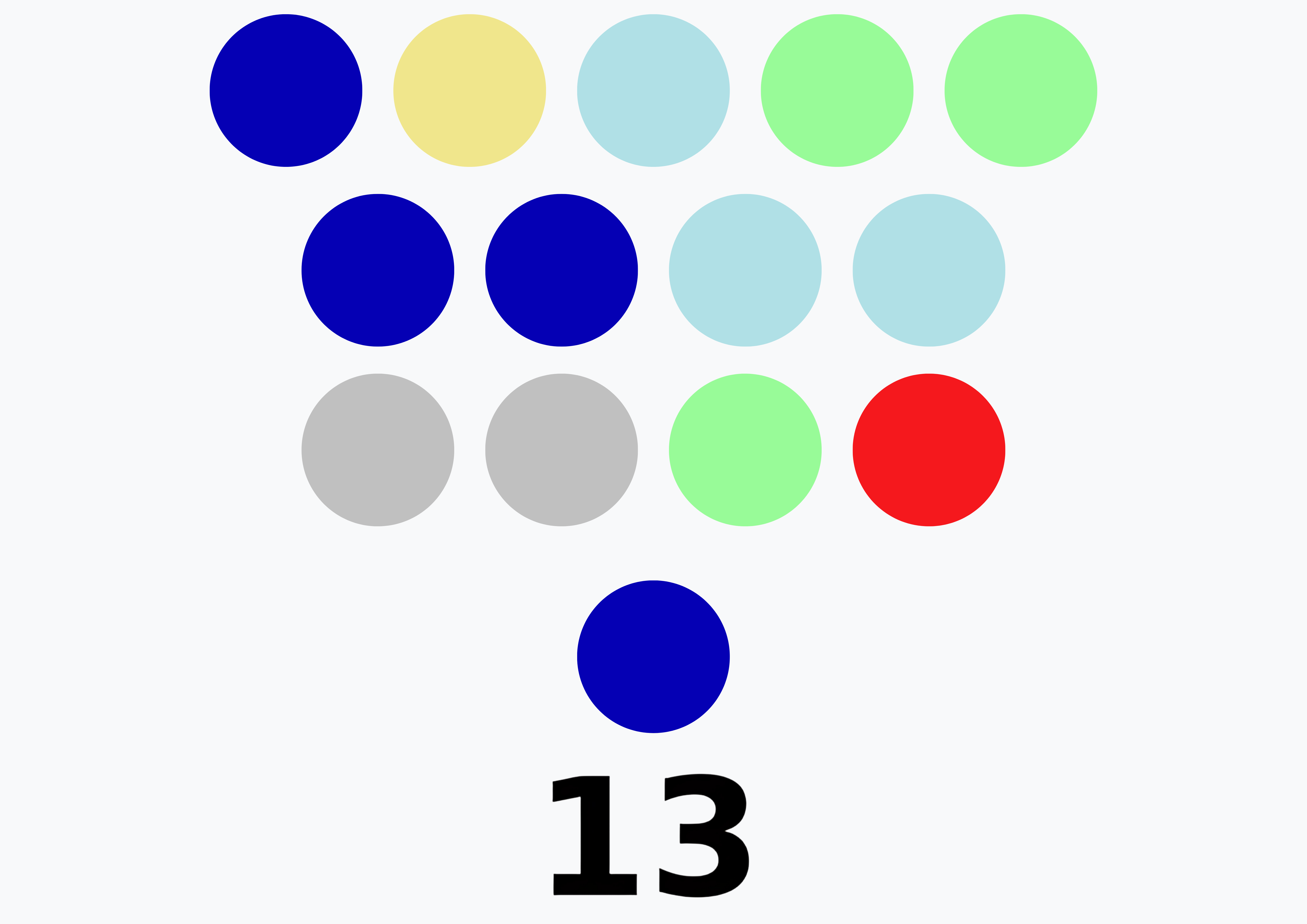
- Political groups: PFP (4) Lakas (3) Nacionalista (3) Liberal (1) Uswag (1) Nonpartisan (2)
- Committees: 29 standing committees
- Length of term: 3 years, renewable twice
- Authority: Local Government Code of the Philippines

Elections
- Voting system: Multiple non-transferable vote (regular members); Indirect election (ex officio members)
- Last election: May 12, 2025
- Next election: May 8, 2028

Meeting place
- Iloilo Provincial Capitol; Bonifacio Drive, Iloilo City

The Iloilo Provincial Board is the Sangguniang Panlalawigan (provincial legislature) of the Philippine province of Iloilo.

The members are elected via plurality-at-large voting: the province is divided into five districts, each having two seats. A voter votes up to two names, with the top two candidates per district being elected. The vice governor is the ex officio presiding officer, and only votes to break ties. The vice governor is elected via the plurality voting system province-wide.

The districts used in appropriation of members are coextensive with the legislative districts of Iloilo.

Aside from the regular members, the board also includes the provincial federation presidents of the Liga ng mga Barangay (ABC, from its old name "Association of Barangay Captains"), the Sangguniang Kabataan (SK, youth councils) and the Philippine Councilors League (PCL).

== Apportionment ==
Since 1992, Sangguniang Panlalawigan members have been elected from districts to ensure geographical representation, and the size of the province's Sanggunian was dependent on its income classification rather than population.

Elections	Seats per district					Ex officio seats	Total seats
Elections	1st	2nd	3rd	4th	5th	Ex officio seats	Total seats
1992 - Present	2	2	2	2	2	3	13

== Current members ==
These are the members after the 2025 local elections and 2023 Philippine barangay and Sangguniang Kabataan elections.

=== Leadership ===
- Vice Governor: Nathalie Ann F. Debuque (PFP)
- Floor Leader: Rolex T. Suplico (Uswag)
- Secretary: Alan G. Villanueva (Acting)

=== Members ===
Seat	Board member	Party	Term number	Start of term	End of term	Registered in
1st District	Rica Jane L. Garin	Lakas	1	June 30, 2025	June 30, 2028	Miagao
1st District	Jo Ann B. Germinanda	Lakas	1	February 7, 2023	June 30, 2028	Guimbal
2nd District	June S. Mondejar	PFP	3	June 30, 2019	June 30, 2028	New Lucena
2nd District	Rolito C. Cajilig	PFP	3	June 30, 2019	June 30, 2028	Leon
3rd District	Mark P. Palabrica	PFP	1	June 30, 2025	June 30, 2028	Bingawan
3rd District	Jason R. Gonzales	Liberal	3	June 30, 2019	June 30, 2028	Lambunao
4th District	Rolando B. Distura	Nacionalista	3	June 30, 2019	June 30, 2028	Dumangas
4th District	Dominic Paul C. Oso	Nacionalista	1	June 30, 2025	June 30, 2028	Barotac Nuevo
5th District	Nielito C. Tupas	Lakas	1	June 30, 2025	June 30, 2028	Barotac Viejo
5th District	Rolex T. Suplico	Uswag	1	June 30, 2025	June 30, 2028	Estancia
LNB	Amalia Victoria F. Debuque	Nonpartisan	-	January 13, 2024	November 2026	Anilao
PCL	Jo Jan Paul J. Peñol	Nacionalista	-	September 12, 2025	June 30, 2028	Pavia
SK	Esara Andica A. Javier	Nonpartisan	-	November 25, 2023	November 2026	Sara

=== 15th Sangguniang Panlalawigan Standing Committees ===
The Standing Committee of the 15th Sangguniang Panlalawigan was finalized under Vice Governor Nathalie Ann Debuque during the second regular session on July 8, 2025. A total of 29 committees were assigned through a collaborative process, with each chaired by a member of the Sangguniang Panlalawigan. The table below lists the standing committees and their respective chairs and vice chairs.

Committee	Committee Chairperson	Committee Vice Chairperson
Accounts	Mark P. Palabrica	Jo Ann B. Germinanda
Agriculture	Rolito C. Cajilig	Rolando B. Distura
Appropriations	Dominic Paul C. Oso	June S. Mondejar; Rolito S. Cajilig
Aquatic Resources	Nielito C. Tupas	Jo Ann B. Germinanda
Barangay Affairs	Amalia Victoria F. Debuque	Esara Andica A. Javier
Cooperatives and Other Non-Governmental Organizations	Rolito C. Cajilig	Nielito C. Tupas
Cultural Communities and Underprivileged	Esara Andica A. Javier	Mark P. Palabrica
Culture, Arts, History and Tourism	Nielito C. Tupas	Nathalie Ann F. Debuque
Disaster Risk Reduction and Management	Rolando B. Distura	Mark P. Palabrica
Economic Affairs and Investment	Jason R. Gonzales	Rica Jane L. Garin
Education and Information	Jason R. Gonzales	Nathalie Ann F. Debuque
Environmental and Natural Resources	Amalia Victoria F. Debuque	Rolando B. Distura
Games and Amusement	Jo Jan Paul J. Peñol	Amalia Victoria F. Debuque
General Services and Human Resources	Mark P. Palabrica	Dominic Paul C. Oso
Health and Sanitation	Nathalie Ann F. Debuque	Nielito C. Tupas
Infrastructure	Rolando B. Distura	Rolito C. Cajilig
Justice, Good Government and Human Rights	Rica Jane L. Garin	Rolex T. Suplico
Labor and Employment	Jo Ann B. Germinanda	Rolando B. Distura
Ordinances, Legal Matters and Inter-governmental Relations	Jo Jan Paul J. Peñol	June S. Mondejar
Oversight	Dominic Paul C. Oso	Mark P. Palabrica
Public Order and Security	June S. Mondejar	Rolando B. Distura
Rules, Privileges, Ethics and Accountability	Rolex T. Suplico	Dominic Paul C. Oso
Science and Technology	Rica Jane L. Garin	Nathalie Ann F. Debuque
Social Welfare, Housing, Senior Citizen and Persons with Disability	Rolex T. Suplico	Rica Jane L. Garin
Transportation, Communication and Public Utilities	Nathalie Ann F. Debuque	Jo Jan Paul J. Peñol
Ways and Means	June S. Mondejar	Jo Ann B. Germinanda
Women and Family Affairs	Nathalie Ann F. Debuque	Jo Ann B. Germinanda
Youth Affairs and Sports Development	Esara Andica A. Javier	Amalia Victoria F. Debuque
Zoning and Land Use Planning	Rolex T. Suplico	Jo Jan Paul J. Peñol

== List of members ==
This is a list of former and incumbent Vice Governors who have served as presiding officers of the Provincial Board, along with former and incumbent Board members.

=== Vice Governor ===
Election year	Name	Party	Origin	
1959	Guardalino Mosqueda		Iloilo City	
1963	Conrado Norada		Miagao	
1967	Conrado Norada		Miagao	
1967	Fortunato Padilla		Cabatuan	
1971	Ramon Duremdes		Dumangas	
1980	Ramon Duremdes		Dumangas	
1980	Carlos Lopez Jr.		Iloilo City	
1980	Simplicio Griño		Oton	
1980	Ramon Lopez Jr.		San Dionisio	
1988	Ramon Duremdes		Dumangas	
1988	Robert Maroma		Cabatuan	
1988	Ramon Duremdes		Dumangas	
1992	Robert Maroma	NPC		Cabatuan
1995	Demetrio Sonza	Lakas		Santa Barbara
1998	Demetrio Sonza	Lakas		Santa Barbara
2001	Roberto Armada	Lakas		Janiuay
2004	Roberto Armada	Lakas		Janiuay
2007	Rolex Suplico	Nacionalista	Estancia	
2010	Oscar Garin Jr.	Lakas–Kampi	Guimbal	
2013	Raul Tupas	Liberal	Barotac Viejo	
2016	Christine Garin	NUP	Guimbal	
2019	Christine Garin	Nacionalista	Guimbal	
2022	Christine Garin	Nacionalista	Guimbal	
2025	Nathalie Ann Debuque	PFP	Anilao	

=== 1st District ===
- Municipality: Guimbal, Igbaras, Miagao, Oton, San Joaquin, Tigbauan, Tubungan
- Population (2024): 377,167

Election year	Member (Origin)	Member (Origin)	Ref.
1992	Oscar Garin Jr. (Guimbal)	Rodolfo Legaspi (Miagao)	
1995	Oscar Garin Jr. (Guimbal)	Anita Silla (Oton)	
1998	Janette Garin (Guimbal)	Anita Silla (Oton)	
2001	Janette Garin (Guimbal)	Bernardo Silla Jr. (Oton)	
2004	Macario Napulan (Miagao)	Bernardo Silla Jr. (Oton)	
2007	Macario Napulan (Miagao)	Oscar Garin Jr. (Guimbal)	
2010	Macario Napulan (Miagao)	Gerardo Flores (Miagao)	
2013	Ninfa Garin (San Joaquin)	Dennis Valencia (Tigbauan)	
2016	Marcelo Valentine Serag (San Joaquin)	Renee Valencia (Tigbauan)	
2019	Marcelo Valentine Serag (San Joaquin)	Renee Valencia (Tigbauan)	
2022	Marcelo Valentine Serag (San Joaquin)	Carmelo Nochete (Miagao)	
2022	Marcelo Valentine Serag (San Joaquin)	Jo Ann Germinanda (Guimbal)	
2025	Rica Jane Garin (Miagao)	Jo Ann Germinanda (Guimbal)	

=== 2nd District ===
- Municipality: Alimodian, Leganes, Leon, New Lucena, Pavia, San Miguel, Santa Barbara, Zarraga
- Population (2024): 355,924

Election year	Member (Origin)	Member (Origin)	Ref.
1992	Demetrio Sonza (Santa Barbara)	Ervin Gerochi (Pavia)	
1995	Rodolfo Cabado (Leon)	Adolfo Jaen (Leganes)	
1998	Rodolfo Cabado (Leon)	Juanito Alipao (Alimodian)	
2001	Cecilia Capadosa (Pavia)	Romulo Cabana Sr. (Leon)	
2004	Cecilia Capadosa (Pavia)	Rodolfo Cabado (Leon)	
2007	June Mondejar (New Lucena)	Rodolfo Cabado (Leon)	
2010	June Mondejar (New Lucena)	Demetrio Sonza (Santa Barbara)	
2013	June Mondejar (New Lucena)	Demetrio Sonza (Santa Barbara)	
2016	Liecel Seville (New Lucena)	Demetrio Sonza (Santa Barbara)	
2019	Rolito Cajilig (Leon)	June Mondejar (New Lucena)	
2022	Rolito Cajilig (Leon)	June Mondejar (New Lucena)	
2025	Rolito Cajilig (Leon)	June Mondejar (New Lucena)	

=== 3rd District ===
- Municipality: Badiangan, Bingawan, Cabatuan, Calinog, Janiuay, Lambunao, Maasin, Mina, Pototan
- Population (2024): 460,006

Election year	Member (Origin)	Member (Origin)	Ref.
1992	Juanito Acanto (Janiuay)	Alberto Javellana (Calinog)	
1995	Juanito Acanto (Janiuay)	Alberto Javellana (Calinog)	
1998	Bienvenido Margarico (Janiuay)	Vicente Ramirez (Lambunao)	
2001	Bienvenido Margarico (Janiuay)	Vicente Ramirez (Lambunao)	
2004	Emmanuel Gallar (Cabatuan)	Ellery Gaje (Badiangan)	
2007	Arthur Defensor Jr. (Mina)	Mariano Malones (Maasin)	
2010	Licurgo Tirador (Pototan)	Emmanuel Gallar (Cabatuan)	
2013	Licurgo Tirador (Pototan)	Emmanuel Gallar (Cabatuan)	
2016	Lorenz Defensor (Mina)	Emmanuel Gallar (Cabatuan)	
2019	Matt Palabrica (Bingawan)	Jason Gonzales (Lambunao)	
2022	Matt Palabrica (Bingawan)	Jason Gonzales (Lambunao)	
2025	Mark Palabrica (Bingawan)	Jason Gonzales (Lambunao)	

=== 4th District ===
- City: Passi
- Municipality: Anilao, Banate, Barotac Nuevo, Dingle, Dueñas, Dumangas, San Enrique
- Population (2024): 407,492

Election year	Member (Origin)	Member (Origin)	Ref.
1992	Grace Fernandez (San Enrique)	Pablito Araneta (Barotac Nuevo)	
1995	Grace Fernandez (San Enrique)	Pablito Araneta (Barotac Nuevo)	
1998	Jose Fernandez Jr. (San Enrique)	Romeo Palmares Sr. (Passi City)	
2001	Henry Anotado (Dingle)	Romeo Palmares Sr. (Passi City)	
2004	Domingo Oso Jr. (Barotac Nuevo)	Romeo Palmares Sr. (Passi City)	
2007	George Demaisip (Barotac Nuevo)	Maria Shalene Palmares-Hidalgo (Passi City)	
2010	Hernan Biron Jr. (Barotac Nuevo)	Maria Shalene Palmares-Hidalgo (Passi City)	
2013	Carmen Rita Monfort-Bautista (Dumangas)	Maria Shalene Palmares-Hidalgo (Passi City)	
2016	Domingo Oso Jr. (Barotac Nuevo)	Bryant Paul Biron (Barotac Nuevo)	
2019	Domingo Oso Jr. (Barotac Nuevo)	Rolando Distura (Dumangas)	
2022	Domingo Oso Jr. (Barotac Nuevo)	Rolando Distura (Dumangas)	
2025	Dominic Paul Oso (Barotac Nuevo)	Rolando Distura (Dumangas)	

=== 5th District ===
- Municipality: Ajuy, Balasan, Barotac Viejo, Batad, Carles, Concepcion, Estancia, Lemery, San Dionisio, San Rafael, Sara
- Population (2024): 482,027

Election year	Member (Origin)	Member (Origin)	Ref.
1992	Antonio Tedoco Jr. (Sara)	Nerio Salcedo Jr. (Sara)	
1995	Rolex Suplico (Barotac Viejo)	Nerio Salcedo Jr. (Sara)	
1998	Antonio Tedoco Jr. (Sara)	Eric Barbosa Sr. (Carles)	
2001	Victorino Salcedo II (Sara)	Eric Barbosa Sr. (Carles)	
2004	Niel Tupas Jr. (Barotac Viejo)	Eric Barbosa Sr. (Carles)	
2007	Jesus Salcedo Jr. (Sara)	Jett Rojas (Ajuy)	
2010	Nielo Tupas (Barotac Viejo)	Jett Rojas (Ajuy)	
2013	Nielo Tupas (Barotac Viejo)	Jesus Salcedo Jr. (Sara)	
2016	Nielo Tupas (Barotac Viejo)	Jeneda Salcedo (Sara)	
2019	Nielito Tupas (Barotac Viejo)	Carol-V Diaz (Ajuy)	
2022	Binky April Tupas (Barotac Viejo)	Carol-V Diaz (Ajuy)	
2025	Nielito Tupas (Barotac Viejo)	Rolex Suplico (Estancia)	

=== Provincial Liga ng mga Barangay President ===
Election year	Member (Origin)	Ref.
1998	Angel Briones (Ajuy)	
2001	Angel Briones (Ajuy)	
2004	Angel Briones (Ajuy)	
2007	Jeneda Salcedo (Sara)	
2010	Jeneda Salcedo (Sara)	
2013	Jeneda Salcedo (Sara)	
2016	Pablito Gemarino (Guimbal)	
2018	Dorothy Paez (Dumangas)	
2023	Amalia Victoria Debuque (Anilao)	

=== Philippine Councilors League - Iloilo Chapter President ===
Election year	Member (Origin)	Ref.
1992	Pablo Nava III (Dumangas)	
1995	Pablo Nava III (Dumangas)	
1998	Domingo Oso Jr. (Barotac Nuevo)	
2001	Igmedio Prado Jr. (San Joaquin)	
2004	Lilia Gonzales (Lambunao)	
2007	Cecilia Colada (Janiuay)	
2010	Suzette Alquisada (Tigbauan)	
2013	Paulino Parian (Janiuay)	
2016	Licurgo Tirador (Pototan)	
2019	Ramon Sullano (Santa Barbara)	
2022	Ramon Sullano (Santa Barbara)	
2025	Christy Love Custodio-Margarico (Interim) (Guimbal)	
2025	Jo Jan Paul J. Peñol (Pavia)	

=== Panlalawigang Pederasyon ng mga Sangguniang Kabataan President ===
Election year	Member (Origin)	Ref.
1998	Rosario Mediatrix Fernandez (San Enrique)	
2001	Jeneda Salcedo (Sara)	
2004	Jeneda Salcedo (Sara)	
2007	Giuseppe Karl Gumban (Dumangas)	
2010	Charmaine de Vicente (San Enrique)	
2018	Ma. Angelica Bianca Requinto (Estancia)	
2023	Esara Andica Javier (Sara)	

=== Iloilo At-Large (Defunct) ===
Includes Guimaras and Iloilo City

Election year	Member	Origin	Ref.
1988	Robert Maroma	Cabatuan	
1988	Juanito Acanto	Janiuay	
1988	Rudy Tupas	Barotac Viejo	
1988	Demetrio Sonza	Santa Barbara	
1988	Juan Garin Sr.	Guimbal	
1988	Leo Agustin Lutero	Janiuay	
1988	Vicente Molejona	Miagao	
1988	Alberto Javellana	Calinog	
1988	Perla Zulueta	Iloilo City	
1988	Jose Cortes Jr.	Zarraga	
1988	Melchor Bonilla	Buenavista	
