= Lorenz Defensor =

Filipino lawyer and politician (born 1977)

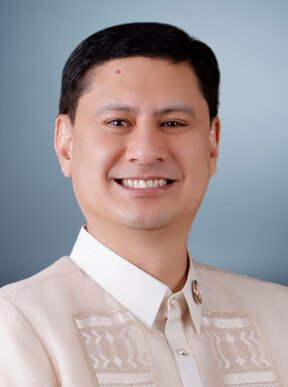
- Official portrait, 2025

Senior Deputy House Majority Leader
- Incumbent
- Assumed office July 29, 2025
- Leader: Sandro Marcos
- Preceded by: Sandro Marcos

Member of the Philippine House of Representatives from Iloilo's 3rd district
- Incumbent
- Assumed office June 30, 2019
- Preceded by: Arthur Defensor Jr.

Member of the Iloilo Provincial Board from the 3rd district
- In office June 30, 2016 – June 30, 2019

Personal details
- Born: July 24, 1977 (age 49) Iloilo City, Philippines
- Party: NUP (2021–present)
- Other political affiliations: PDP–Laban (2018–2021); Liberal (2015–2018)
- Spouse: Vaneza Ungson
- Children: 2
- Parents: Arthur Defensor Sr. (father); Cosette Rivera (mother)
- Relatives: Arthur Defensor Jr. (brother); Mike Defensor (second cousin)
- Education: University of the Philippines Diliman (AB,MA); University of Santo Tomas (LLB)
- Profession: Lawyer; politician

Lorenz Rivera Defensor (born July 24, 1977) is a Filipino lawyer and politician who has served as the representative for Iloilo's third district since 2019.

== Early life and education ==
Lorenz Defensor was born on July 24, 1977, in Iloilo City, Philippines. He is the son of former Iloilo Governor and former congressman Arthur Defensor Sr. and Cosette Rivera.

Defensor earned his undergraduate degree in political science from the University of the Philippines Diliman. He later pursued a Master’s degree in Public Administration at the same university. Additionally, he obtained a Bachelor of Laws degree from the University of Santo Tomas and passed the Philippine Bar Examination in 2004.

== Career ==
=== Early career ===
Before entering politics, Defensor worked as a legal officer at SMC Global Power Holdings Corporation. He also served as a senior partner at Salazar Enrile Defensor & De Mata Law Offices (SEDA Law), specializing in energy law, power and electric utilities, project finance and construction, and local legislation.

=== Political career ===
Defensor began his political career as a provincial board member representing the third district of Iloilo. In 2019, he was elected as the congressman for the district, a position he has held since then.

In February 2025, Defensor was named as a member of the House prosecution team for the impeachment trial of Vice President Sara Duterte. He stated that facing Duterte in the trial was "always an honor."

In the 2026 impeachment trial of Vice President Sara Duterte, Defensor serves as the lead prosecutor for Article IV, which addresses allegations of grave threats.

== Impeachment trial of Sara Duterte ==
On July 7, 2026, the second day of the impeachment trial, House prosecutor Lorenz Defensor opened the proceedings for Article IV with a manifestation arguing that public accountability applies to all officials regardless of their position. Defensor characterized Vice President Sara Duterte's public remarks regarding an alleged assassination plot against the President and other officials as "especially sinister," noting that such threats made by a constitutional successor carry a gravity that strikes "at the very heart of government."

== Political stances ==
In March 2025, Defensor attended a rally supporting KiBam, where he emphasized the importance of unity and continuity in leadership. He stated, "others have separated, we're still together," highlighting his alignment with the opposition's call for cohesive and principled governance.

== Personal life ==
Defensor's brother, Arthur "Toto" Defensor Jr., has served as the governor of Iloilo since 2019. He is married to Vaneza Ungson, a lawyer, and they have two children.

== Electoral history ==
Electoral history of Lorenz Defensor
Year	Office	Party	Votes received				Result
Year	Office	Party	Total	%	P.	Swing	Result
2016	Board Member (Iloilo–3rd)	Liberal	111,291	—N/a	1st	—N/a	Won
2019	Representative (Iloilo–3rd)	PDP-Laban	152,058	85.98%	1st	—N/a	Won
2022	Representative (Iloilo–3rd)	NUP	197,231	98.28%	1st	+12.30	Won
2025	Representative (Iloilo–3rd)	NUP	194,791	98.64%	1st	+0.36	Won

Political offices
Preceded by Licurgo Tirador	Member of the Iloilo Provincial Board from Iloilo's 3rd district 2015–2019	Succeeded by Matt Palabrica
House of Representatives of the Philippines
Preceded by Arthur Defensor Jr.	Member of the House of Representatives from Iloilo's 3rd district 2019–present	Incumbent
