= Cry of Santa Barbara =

Event during the Philippine Revolution

- Part of the Philippine Revolution
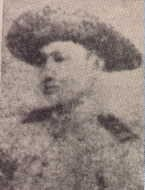
- Martín Delgado
- Date: November 17, 1898
- Venue: Santa Barbara, Iloilo, Captaincy General of the Philippines
- Organised by: Martín Delgado
- Outcome: Formation of a revolutionary government in Visayas

The Cry of Santa Barbara was a call for revolution held in Santa Barbara, Iloilo, against Spanish rule in the Philippines on November 17, 1898. It was led by Martín Delgado.

== Prior events ==
Emilio Aguinaldo declared independence for the Philippines from Spain on June 12, 1898. Months after the independence proclamation, Manila fell to the Americans on August 13. The Spanish government fled Manila and established their new capital for the country in Iloilo City with Diego de los Rios as governor-general.

== The cry ==
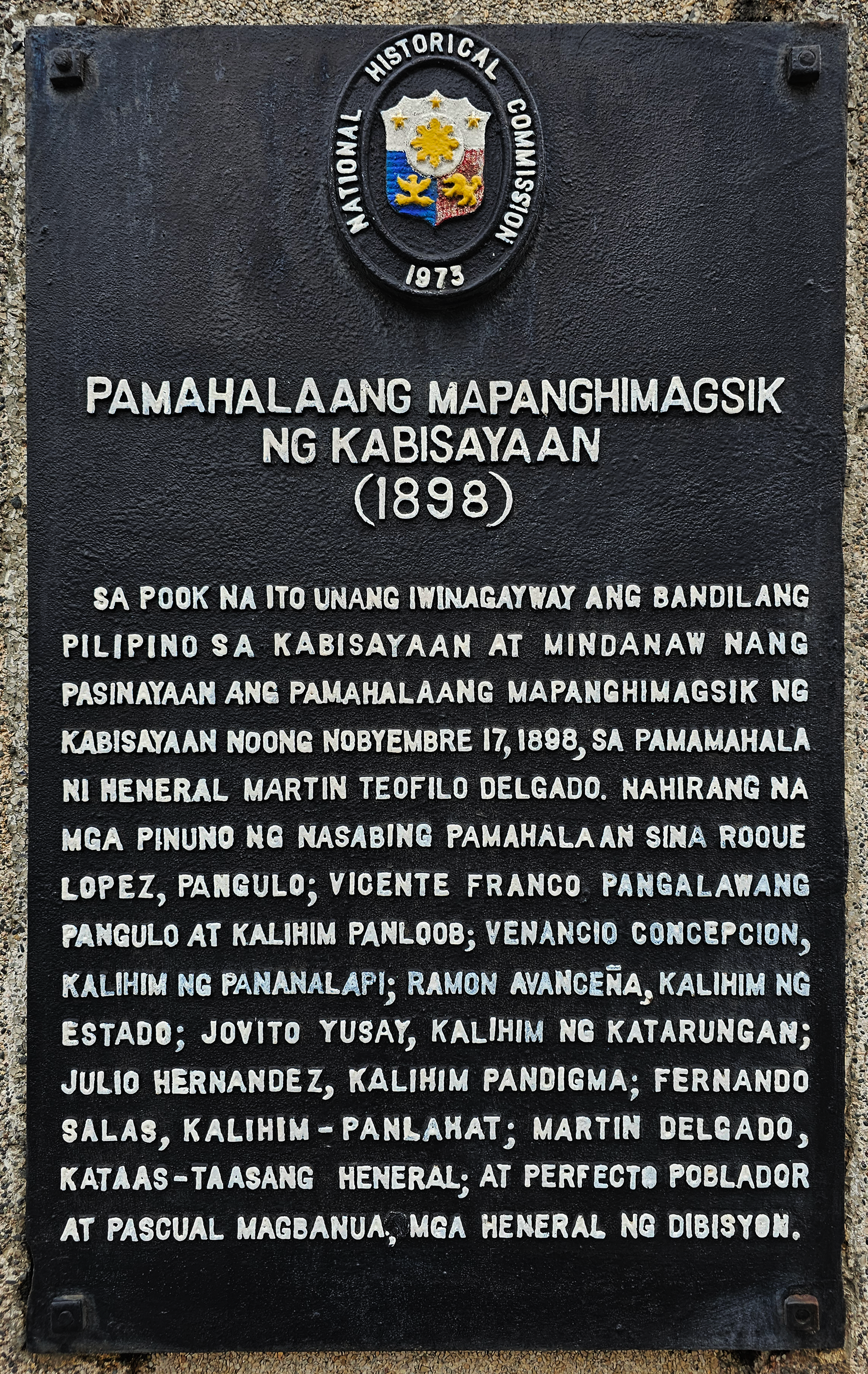
National historical marker installed in 1973 in Santa Barbara, Iloilo, commemorating the inauguration of the revolutionary government of the Visayas

On November 17, 1898, revolutionaries coming from various parts of Iloilo, including Martín Delgado, attended a Catholic mass in the town's church. After the mass, they proceeded to the house of Vicente Bermejo, where the Philippine flag on a bamboo pole was hoisted.

The crowd broke into a cheer. Delgado led in proclaiming Philippine independence, saying: "Viva Filipinas! Fuera España! Viva independencia!" (Long live the Philippines! Down with Spain! Long live independence!).

That became known as the cry of Santa Barbara. The event led to the first hoisting of the Philippine flag outside Luzon. The flag was produced in Jaro, Iloilo City, and a replica of the one flown by Aguinaldo during the proclamation of Philippine independence in Kawit, Cavite.

== Following events ==
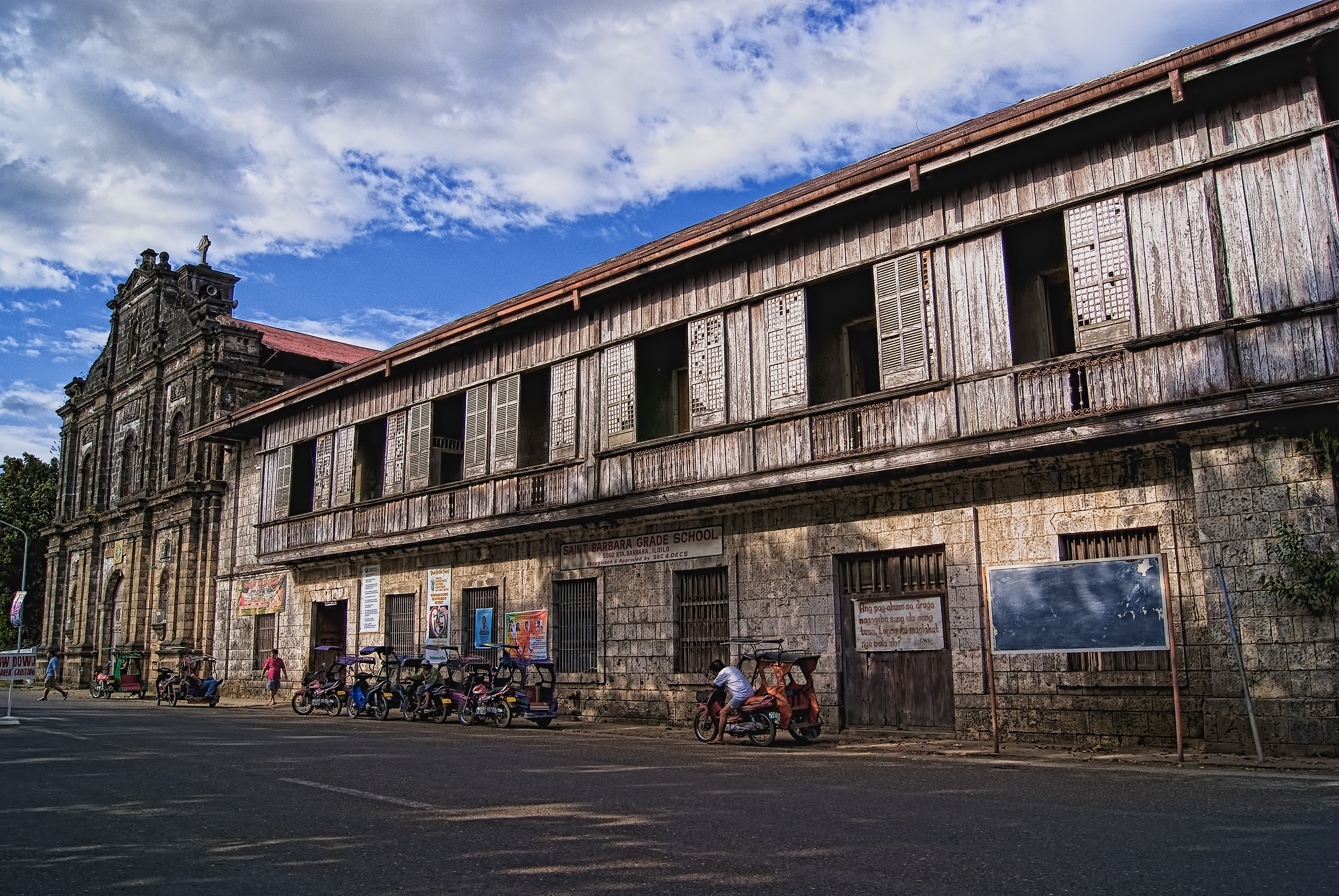
Santa Barbara's church and convent

Santa Barbara became the headquarters of Delgado's revolutionary forces against Spain and from there, he launched campaigns to liberate Iloilo. The town's church and convent served as military garrison and hospital. Under Delgado, the revolutionaries were able to take control most municipalities in Iloilo.

On December 2, 1898, the Federal State of the Visayas was formed, with Roque Lopez as president. With the defeat of the Spanish forces against the revolutionaries, de los Rios surrendered Iloilo City on December 24.

On October 5, 1899, the federal government was dissolved by virtue of a decree from Aguinaldo.
