= Santa Barbara, Iloilo =

Municipality in Iloilo, Philippines

Santa Barbara
- Municipality
- Municipality of Santa Barbara
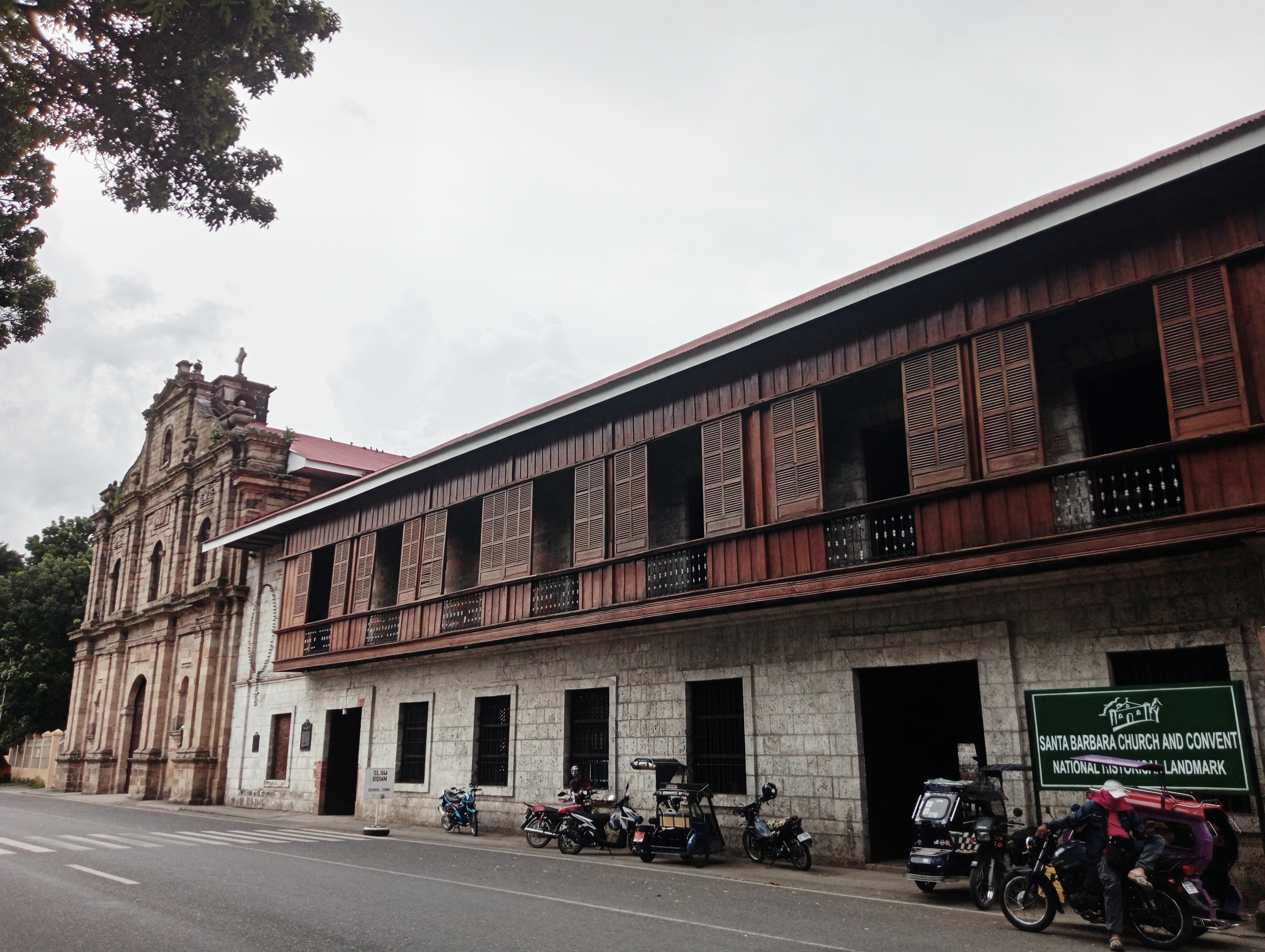
- Santa Barbara Parish Church and Convent

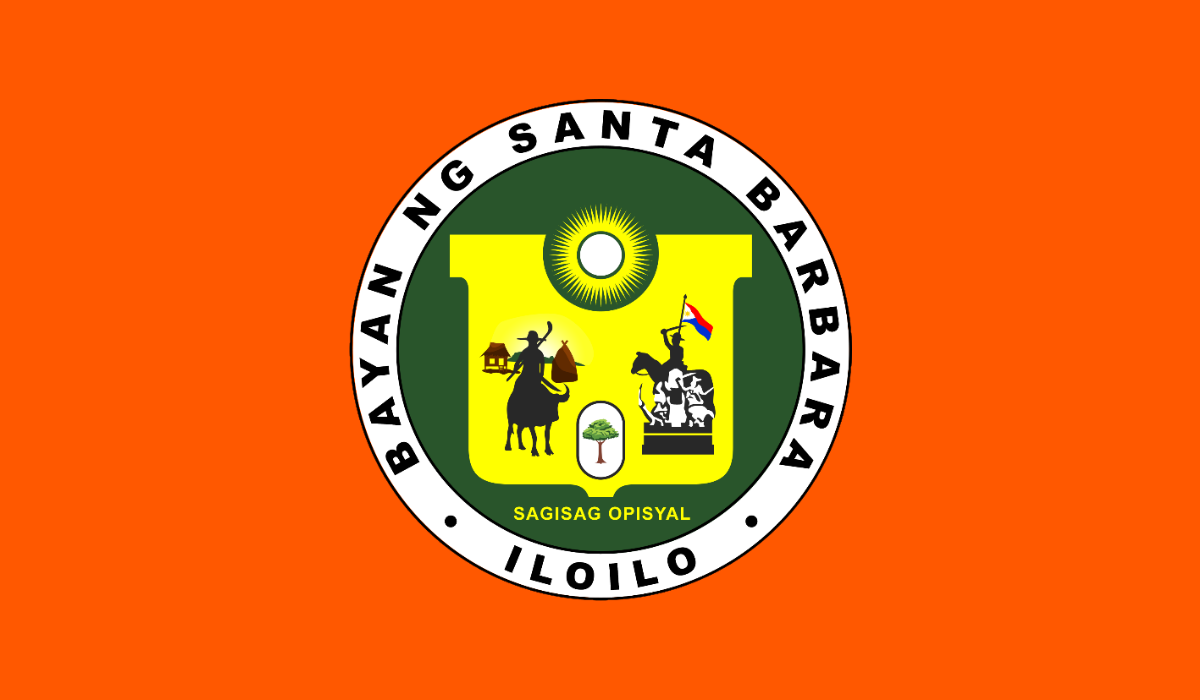
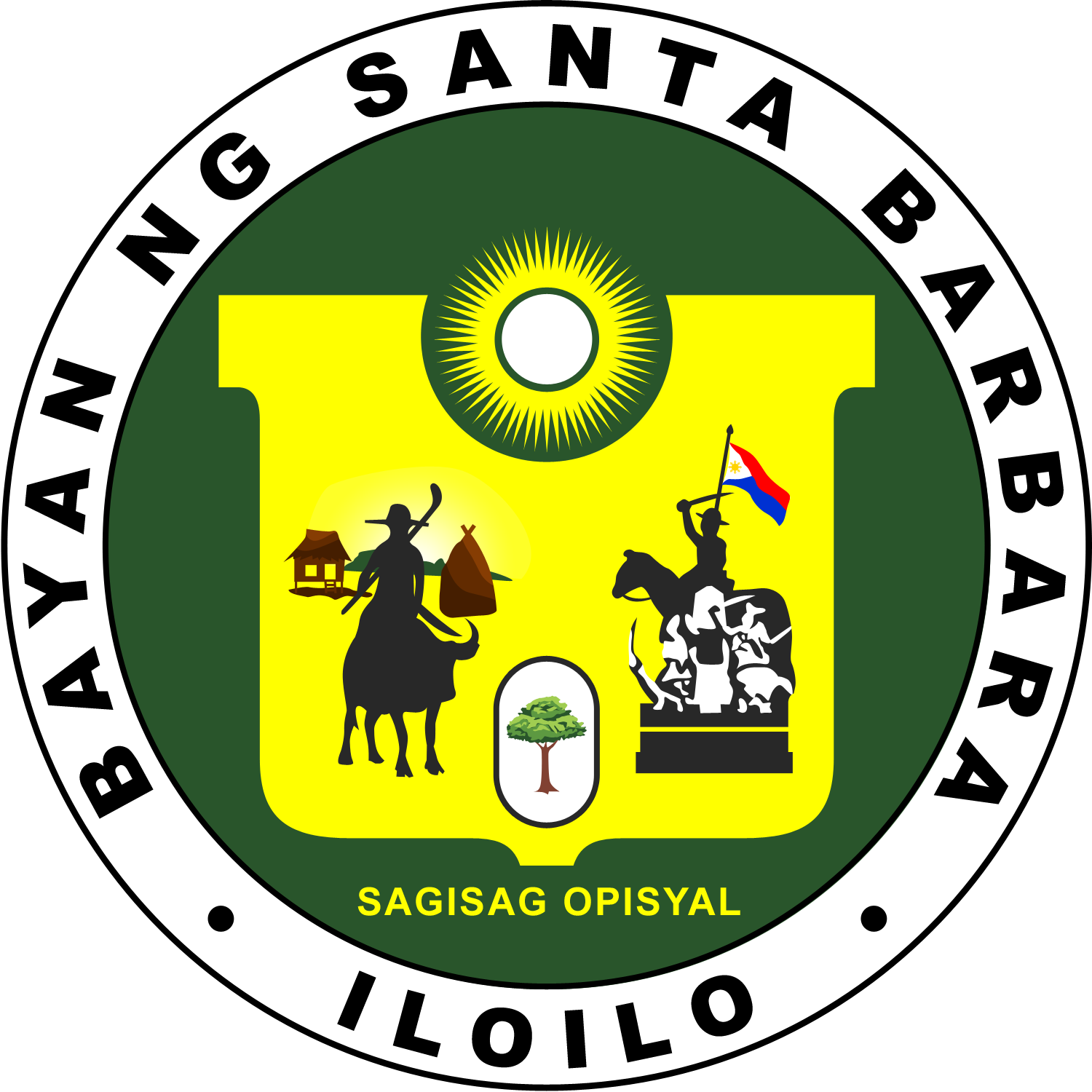
- Flag Seal
- Nickname(s): Cradle of the Revolution in the Visayas, Heritage Center of Western Visayas
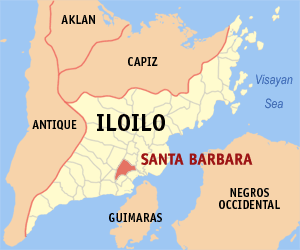
- Map of Iloilo with Santa Barbara highlighted
- Interactive map of Santa Barbara
- Location within the Philippines
- Coordinates: 10°49′23″N 122°32′04″E
- Country: Philippines
- Region: Western Visayas
- Province: Iloilo
- District: 2nd district
- Founded: 1617
- Named for: Saint Barbara
- Barangays: 60 (see Barangays)

Government
  - Type: Sangguniang Bayan
  - Mayor: Dennis S. Superficial (PFP)
  - Vice Mayor: Ramon G. Sullano (Nacionalista)
  - Representative: Kathryn Joyce F. Gorriceta (Lakas)
  - Municipal Council: Members: Crisanto C. Colada (PFP); Ramon Julius S. Sodusta (PFP); Christine Marie D. Robles (PFP); Neil S. Superficial (PFP); Clyd Y. Octaviano (PFP); Timoteo M. Padilla (Nacionalista); Ma. Salvacion Portia A. Maquino (Ind); Charles Louigi S. Badon (Ind); Larry P. Deatras ^{‡}; Nikka Joan H. Suganob ^{◌}; ‡ ex officio ABC president; ◌ ex officio SK chairman
  - Electorate: 43,196 voters (2025)

Area
  - Total: 131.96 km^{2} (50.95 sq mi)
- Elevation: 35 m (115 ft)
- Highest elevation: 134 m (440 ft)
- Lowest elevation: 11 m (36 ft)

Population (2024 census)
  - Total: 68,467
  - Density: 518.85/km^{2} (1,343.8/sq mi)
  - Households: 16,737

Economy
  - Income class: 1st municipal income class
  - Poverty incidence: 8.06% (2023)
  - Revenue: ₱ 334.6 million (2024)
  - Assets: ₱ 125.3 million (2024)
  - Expenditure: ₱ 266.4 million (2024)
  - Liabilities: ₱ 421 million (2024)

Service provider
  - Electricity: Iloilo 1 Electric Cooperative (ILECO 1)
- Time zone: UTC+8 (PST)
- ZIP code: 5002
- PSGC: 063043000
- IDD : area code: +63 (0)33
- Native languages: Hiligaynon; Karay-a; Ati; Tagalog

Santa Barbara, officially the Municipality of Santa Barbara (Hiligaynon: Banwa sang Santa Barbara, Tagalog: Bayan ng Santa Barbara), is a municipality in the province of Iloilo, Philippines. It is situated north of Iloilo City and forms part of the Metro Iloilo–Guimaras area. Santa Barbara is historically known as the site of the first raising of the Philippine flag outside Luzon on November 17, 1898, during the Philippine Revolution. The event, known as the Cry of Santa Barbara, also marked the inauguration of the Revolutionary Government of the Visayas, led by President Roque Lopez and General Martin Delgado. The municipality later served as the headquarters of the revolutionary forces in Iloilo.

The municipality is also home to the historic Santa Barbara Church and Convent, a National Historical Landmark and National Cultural Treasure, and the Iloilo Golf and Country Club, recognized as the oldest existing golf course in Southeast Asia. According to the 2024 census, Santa Barbara has a population of 68,467 people.

== History ==
=== Early settlement and Spanish colonial period ===
Santa Barbara Church, founded in 1760

The early settlement that developed into Santa Barbara was known as Catmon. Historical accounts of the Augustinian missionary presence in the area trace the community's origins to approximately 1617, when it was served as a religious settlement or visita under the jurisdiction of Jaro. The name Catmon was associated with a prominent katmon tree that served as a landmark in the settlement.

In 1760, Catmon became an independent parish under the patronage of Saint Barbara, after whom the settlement was subsequently named. Over time, the community developed into a pueblo during the Spanish colonial period. Its growth was associated with the expansion of religious and civic institutions in the area.

The surrounding plain was historically associated with agricultural production. The Tigum and Aganan rivers, which traverse the municipality and neighboring areas, contributed to the development of farming communities. Historical accounts identify rice, corn, tobacco, and sugar among the crops cultivated in the area.

=== Philippine Revolution ===
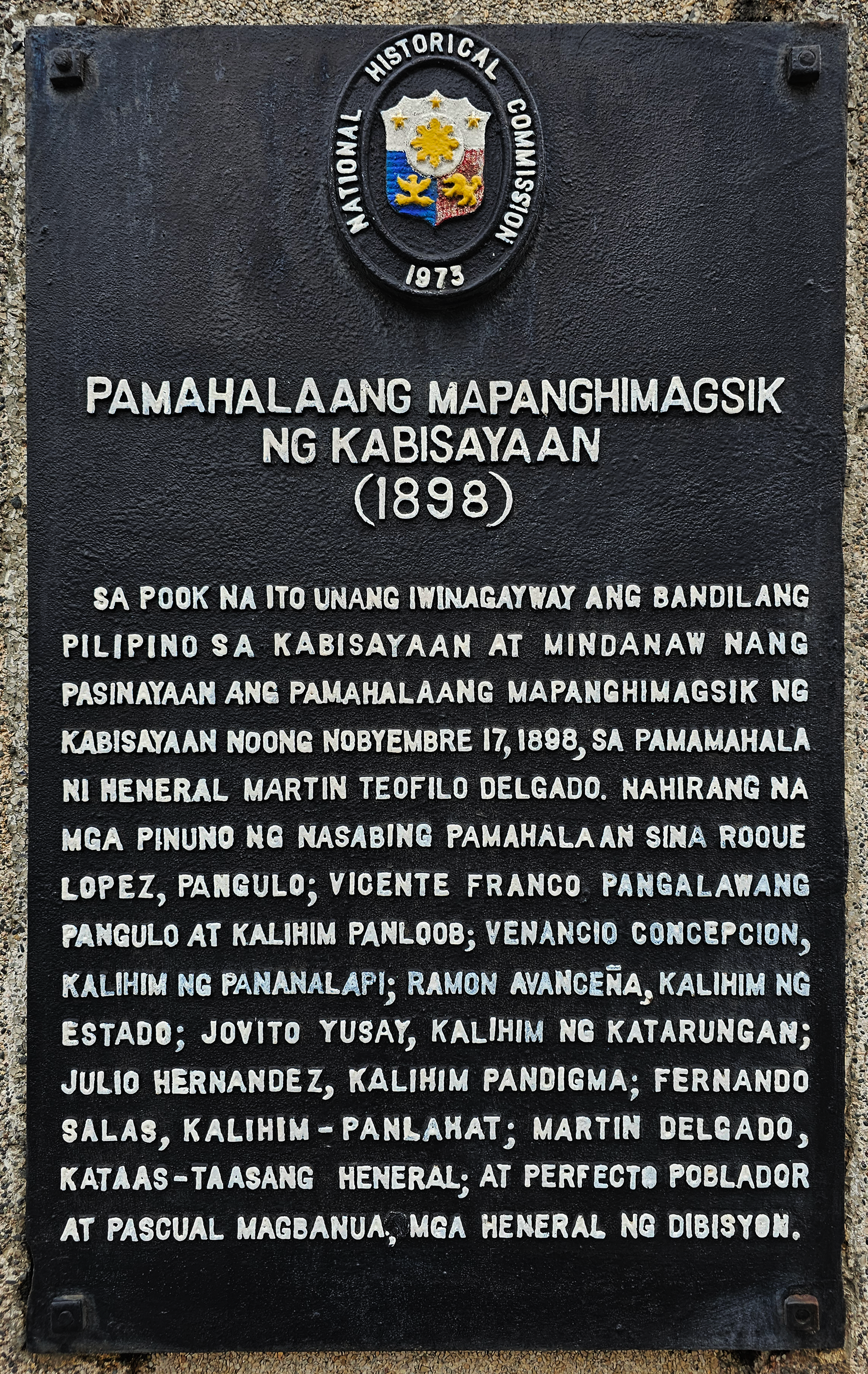
Revolutionary Government of the Visayas historical marker

General Martín Teófilo Delgado

Santa Barbara played a significant role in the Philippine Revolution against Spanish colonial rule in the Visayas. In 1898, General Martin Delgado, a native of Santa Barbara and a prominent revolutionary leader, organized revolutionary forces in the province after initially serving in the Spanish-organized volunteer militia.

On October 28, 1898, Delgado openly declared his support for the revolution and took control of the municipal government in Santa Barbara. The revolutionary movement subsequently expanded throughout Iloilo, with Santa Barbara becoming the headquarters of the revolutionary forces.

On November 17, 1898, the Revolutionary Government of the Visayas was formally inaugurated in Santa Barbara. The ceremony was attended by revolutionary leaders and representatives from different parts of the province. The Philippine flag was raised during the occasion, an event recognized as the first raising of the flag outside Luzon in the revolutionary movement's expansion into the Visayas.

The revolutionary government was headed by Roque Lopez as president, with Vicente Franco serving as vice president and secretary of the interior. Other members included Venancio Concepcion, Ramon Avanceña, Jovito Yusay, Julio Hernandez, and Fernando Salas. General Martin Delgado was appointed general-in-chief of the revolutionary forces. General Adriano Hernández headed the Liberating Army in the province of Iloilo.

The church and convent of Santa Barbara served as the headquarters of Delgado's revolutionary army. From Santa Barbara, the revolutionary forces conducted military operations that contributed to the end of Spanish colonial rule in Iloilo. The campaign culminated in the surrender of Spanish Governor-General Diego de los Ríos in Iloilo City on December 24, 1898.

The establishment of the revolutionary government in Santa Barbara is commemorated as the Cry of Santa Barbara. The event represents the participation of the people of Iloilo and the wider Visayas in the Philippine struggle for independence.

=== Philippine–American War and American period ===
Following the end of Spanish colonial rule, the Philippine–American War began. General Delgado continued to lead revolutionary forces against American troops in Iloilo. He surrendered on February 2, 1901, marking the end of organized resistance under his command in the province.

Following the establishment of American civil administration, Delgado became the first provincial governor of Iloilo. The town subsequently continued to develop under the new colonial administration.

==== Migration to Mindanao ====
During the 1940s and 1950s, residents of Santa Barbara were among those who migrated from Panay to Mindanao as part of government-sponsored resettlement programs. These movements were encouraged during the administration of President Manuel Roxas, who was born in Panay, as the government sought to promote settlement and agricultural development in Mindanao.

Many migrants from Santa Barbara and other parts of Iloilo settled in areas of present-day Soccsksargen region. Communities with Ilonggo roots developed in several cities and municipalities, including General Santos, Koronadal, Tacurong, Kidapawan, and parts of South Cotabato, Sultan Kudarat, and Cotabato province. The migration contributed to the spread of Hiligaynon language and Ilonggo cultural traditions in parts of Mindanao.

=== Contemporary period ===
Santa Barbara Victory Plaza

In 1948, Barangay Tuburan-Solbud was transferred from Santa Barbara to the municipality of Zarraga, Iloilo.

In 1972, President Ferdinand Marcos declared martial law in the Philippines, beginning a period of authoritarian rule that lasted until 1986. During this period, Second Lieutenant Pablo G. Fernandez, a military officer who opposed martial law, was reportedly detained and executed at an unidentified military camp in Santa Barbara. His death was among the cases of human rights abuses recorded during the Marcos dictatorship.

Santa Barbara experienced increased development following the opening of Iloilo International Airport in 2007, which is located in the neighboring municipalities of Cabatuan. Its location along a major route connecting the airport to Iloilo City contributed to its growing role as a commercial and residential area. Property developers, including Global-Estate Resorts, a subsidiary of Megaworld Corporation, have invested in mixed-use developments in the municipality.

The municipality has also become a proposed location for provincial government offices. The Iloilo Provincial Government has pursued plans to relocate some of its offices from Iloilo City to a government center in Santa Barbara, partly to address congestion in the provincial capital. In 2026, proposals were also raised to make Santa Barbara the new capital of Iloilo province, replacing Iloilo City.

== Geography ==
Residential lake in Sta. Barbara Heights

Santa Barbara is located 15 kilometres (9.3 mi) north of Iloilo City and is part of the Metro Iloilo–Guimaras area. It has a total land area of 13,196 hectares (32,610 acres), ranking 29th in size among the 42 municipalities of Iloilo province and accounting for approximately 1.5% of the province's total land area. Almost 100% of Santa Barbara's land is classified as cultivated and alienable or disposable.

The municipality's topography ranges from gently rolling hills to nearly flat or gradually sloping plains. The Tigum River flows through its central area from the northwest to the southeast, while the Aganan River runs through its southern section.

=== Land use ===
Santa Barbara is primarily an agricultural municipality, with 84.75% of its land area, or 6,568.19 hectares (16,230.4 acres), devoted to agriculture. Its rolling hills, covering 155.99 hectares (385.5 acres), are generally unsuitable for farming and are instead used as pastureland and open grassland.

Built-up areas in the poblacion and the barangays cover a total of 678.98 hectares (1,677.8 acres), or 8.761% of the municipality's land area. These include areas used for commercial and institutional purposes, as well as parks and open spaces.

Agro-industrial areas cover 101.928 hectares (251.87 acres), or 1.315% of the total land area, while industrial areas account for 5.33 hectares (13.2 acres), or 0.069 %. Utilities and roads occupy 150.853 hectares (372.77 acres), or 1.946%. Cemeteries cover 4.72 hectares (11.7 acres), or 0.061 %, while bodies of water account for 84 hectares (210 acres), or 1.084%.

=== Climate ===
Climate data for Santa Barbara, Iloilo
Month	Jan	Feb	Mar	Apr	May	Jun	Jul	Aug	Sep	Oct	Nov	Dec	Year
Mean daily maximum °C (°F)	30 (86)	31 (88)	32 (90)	33 (91)	32 (90)	30 (86)	29 (84)	29 (84)	29 (84)	29 (84)	30 (86)	30 (86)	30 (87)
Mean daily minimum °C (°F)	21 (70)	21 (70)	22 (72)	23 (73)	24 (75)	25 (77)	24 (75)	24 (75)	24 (75)	24 (75)	23 (73)	22 (72)	23 (74)
Average precipitation mm (inches)	19 (0.7)	17 (0.7)	26 (1.0)	37 (1.5)	119 (4.7)	191 (7.5)	258 (10.2)	260 (10.2)	248 (9.8)	196 (7.7)	97 (3.8)	39 (1.5)	1,507 (59.3)
Average rainy days	7.2	5.2	8.3	11.9	22.3	26.5	28.3	28.2	27.3	26.4	18.7	11.8	222.1
Source: Meteoblue

Santa Barbara has a climate that is generally suitable for growing a variety of crops. It is classified as having a Type C climate, characterized by sufficient rainfall throughout the year and approximately four and a half dry months. It also has two distinct seasons, each lasting about six months.

The municipality receives an average annual rainfall of 137.47 centimetres (54.12 in) and has an average temperature of 27.9 °C (82.2 °F). Although Santa Barbara is not located within the Philippines' main typhoon belt, it is occasionally affected by tropical storms and typhoons.

=== Barangays ===
Santa Barbara is politically subdivided into 60 barangays. Each barangay consists of puroks, and some also have sitios.

- Agusipan
- Agutayan
- Bagumbayan
- Balabag
- Balibagan Este
- Balibagan Oeste
- Ban-ag
- Bantay
- Barangay Zone I (Poblacion)
- Barangay Zone II (Poblacion)
- Barangay Zone III (Poblacion)
- Barangay Zone IV (Poblacion)
- Barangay Zone V (Poblacion)
- Barangay Zone VI (Poblacion)
- Barasan Este
- Barasan Oeste
- Binangkilan
- Bitaog-Taytay
- Bolong Este
- Bolong Oeste
- Buayahon
- Buyo
- Cabugao Norte
- Cabugao Sur
- Cadagmayan Norte
- Cadagmayan Sur
- Cafe
- Calaboa Este
- Calaboa Oeste
- Camambugan
- Canipayan
- Conaynay
- Daga
- Dalid
- Duyanduyan
- Gen. Martin T. Delgado
- Guno
- Inangayan
- Jibao-an
- Lacadon
- Lanag
- Lupa
- Magancina
- Malawog
- Mambuyo
- Manhayang
- Miraga-Guibuangan
- Nasugban
- Omambog
- Pal-agon
- Pungsod
- San Sebastian
- Sangcate
- Tagsing
- Talanghauan
- Talongadian
- Tigtig
- Tungay
- Tuburan
- Tugas

== Demographics ==
Population census of Santa Barbara
Year	Pop.	±% p.a.
1903	15,149	—
1918	28,467	+4.30%
1939	35,406	+1.04%
1948	21,951	−5.17%
1960	23,458	+0.55%
1970	27,858	+1.73%
1975	30,662	+1.94%
1980	32,693	+1.29%
1990	37,730	+1.44%
1995	39,667	+0.94%
2000	46,076	+3.26%
2007	51,075	+1.43%
2010	55,472	+3.05%
2015	60,215	+1.57%
2020	67,630	+2.47%
2024	68,467	+0.30%
Source: Philippine Statistics Authority

In the 2024 census, the population of Santa Barbara was 68,467 people, with a population density of 520 inhabitants per square kilometre or 1,300 inhabitants per square mile.

=== Languages ===
The main languages spoken in Santa Barbara are Hiligaynon and Kinaray-a. Hiligaynon, also known as Ilonggo, is predominantly spoken in the urban areas of the municipality, while Kinaray-a is more commonly used in rural communities and areas on the outskirts of the Iloilo metropolitan area. Tagalog and English are also spoken, particularly in schools, government offices, and businesses.

=== Religion ===
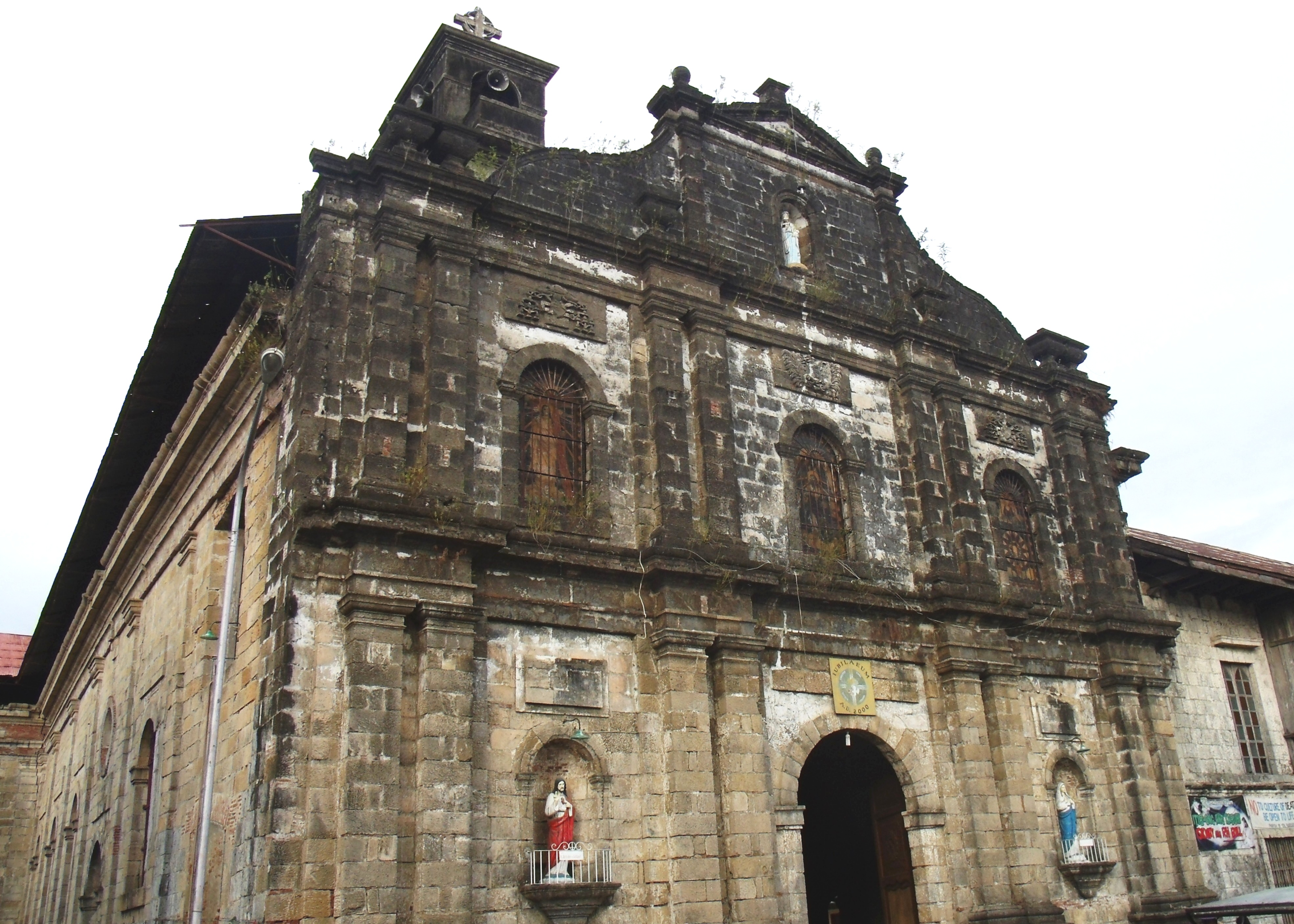
Santa Barbara Church

Roman Catholicism is the main religious tradition in Santa Barbara. The municipality is named after its patron saint, Saint Barbara, whose feast is celebrated every December 4. The historic Santa Barbara Church and Convent is one of the town's most important religious landmarks. It is recognized as both a National Historical Landmark and a National Cultural Treasure by the National Historical Commission of the Philippines.

Other Christian denominations are also present in the municipality.

=== Culture ===
Santa Barbara is known for its historical and cultural traditions, particularly those connected to the Philippine Revolution. Every November 17, the municipality celebrates the Kahilwayan Festival, which commemorates the Cry of Santa Barbara in 1898. The festival features street dancing, cultural performances, and reenactments of historical events involving General Martin T. Delgado and the revolutionary forces. It also represents Santa Barbara in the Kasadyahan sa Kabanwahanan competition during the Dinagyang Festival in Iloilo City, where it has won the championship. The festival has also represented Iloilo in the Aliwan Fiesta, a national cultural festival held in Manila.

The annual feast of Saint Barbara on December 4 is another important local celebration. It includes religious activities and gatherings among residents.

== Economy ==
Poverty incidence of Santa Barbara (%)

Source: Philippine Statistics Authority

Santa Barbara has an economy based on agriculture, commerce, and services. Its location near Iloilo City and Iloilo International Airport has also contributed to the growth of businesses and residential developments in the municipality.

=== Agriculture ===
Agriculture has traditionally been one of the main sources of livelihood in Santa Barbara. Rice is the primary crop, followed by corn, mung beans, mangoes, and other fruits and vegetables. Farmers also raise livestock and poultry, while some communities engage in freshwater fish farming. Bamboo is also grown in parts of the municipality and used for various products.

=== Commerce and services ===
The municipality has a public market that serves as a center for local trade. Commercial activities include retail and wholesale businesses, restaurants, transportation, and other services. Small-scale industries and manufacturing activities also contribute to the local economy.

Santa Barbara has also experienced increased property development as part of the expansion of Metro Iloilo. One of its major developments is Sta. Barbara Heights, a 173-hectare (430-acre) mixed-use tourism estate developed by Global-Estate Resorts, Inc., a subsidiary of Megaworld Corporation. The development includes residential communities and planned commercial, institutional, and business areas.

== Government ==
Santa Barbara Town Hall

Santa Barbara is governed by a municipal mayor, a vice mayor, and the Sangguniang Bayan, its legislative council. The municipality is politically divided into 60 barangays, each headed by a barangay chairperson. It is part of the Second District of Iloilo province.

Santa Barbara is also emerging as a center for provincial and regional government offices. The Iloilo Provincial Government Center in Barangay Bolong Oeste is planned to accommodate provincial satellite offices and national government agencies, including the Department of Health (DOH), Department of the Interior and Local Government (DILG), Office of Civil Defense (OCD), and Philippine Health Insurance Corporation (PhilHealth). The development aims to decongest Iloilo City by relocating some government offices outside the urban center.

Plans have also been proposed to designate Santa Barbara as the new capital of Iloilo province, replacing Iloilo City. In November 2026, a bill seeking to establish the municipality as the provincial capital moved forward in Congress.

Local Government Unit of Santa Barbara
Mayor
Dennis S. Superficial (PFP)	
Vice Mayor
Ramon G. Sullano (Nacionalista)	
Sangguniang Panglungsod Members
Crisanto C. Colada (PFP)	Ramon Julius S. Sodusta (PFP)
Christine Marie D. Robles (PFP)	Neil S. Superficial (PFP)
Clyd Y. Octaviano (PFP)	Timoteo M. Padilla (Nacionalista)
Ma. Salvacion Portia A. Maquino (Ind)	Charles Louigi S. Badon (Ind)
ABC President
Larry P. Deatras
SK Federation President
Nikka Joan H. Suganob

== Tourism ==
Santa Barbara is known for its historical landmarks, heritage structures, and recreational attractions. Many of its notable sites are associated with the Philippine Revolution and the municipality's cultural heritage.

=== Historical landmarks ===
The Santa Barbara Church and Convent is one of the municipality's most significant historical structures. Built during the Spanish colonial period, it served as a meeting place for revolutionary leaders under General Martin T. Delgado during the Philippine Revolution. It was declared a National Historical Landmark in 1991 and a National Cultural Treasure in 2013.

The Cry of Santa Barbara Marker commemorates the events of November 17, 1898, when the Philippine flag was raised outside Luzon for the first time. Nearby, the Santa Barbara Plaza, also known as Victory Plaza, features the historic bandstand built in 1925, the Rizal Monument, and other commemorative structures. The plaza was also the site of the inauguration of the Revolutionary Government of the Visayas in 1898.

The General Martin T. Delgado Monument stands near the municipal hall and honors the revolutionary leader who commanded the Filipino forces in Iloilo. Other historical attractions include the Roman Catholic Cemetery, constructed in 1845, and the Centennial Museum and Convention Center, which was built in 1998 as part of the Philippine Centennial celebrations. The museum houses historical artifacts, photographs, and other materials documenting the municipality's history. The Catmon Tree near the municipal hall is also associated with the origin of the town's name.

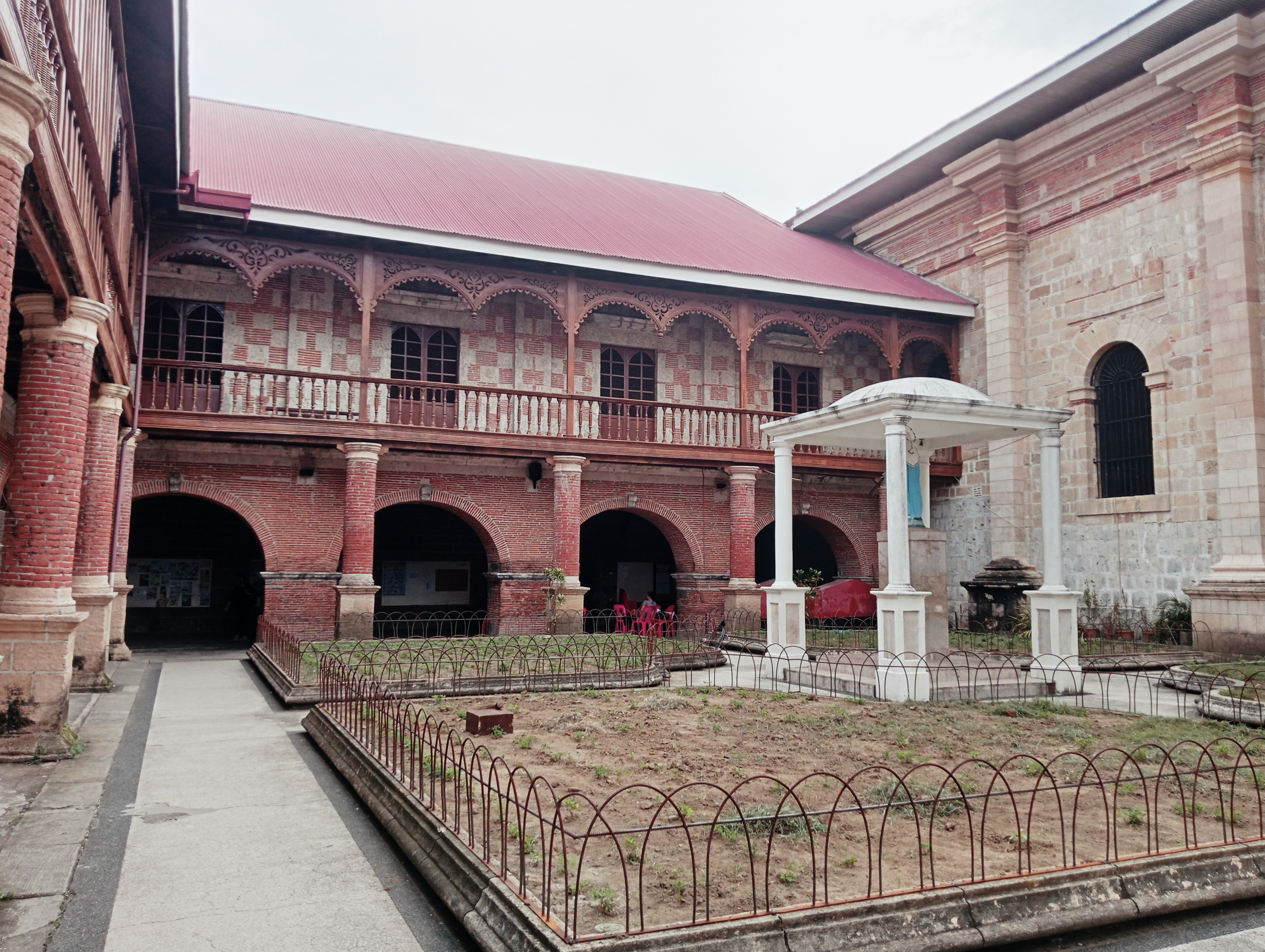
Santa Barbara Convent

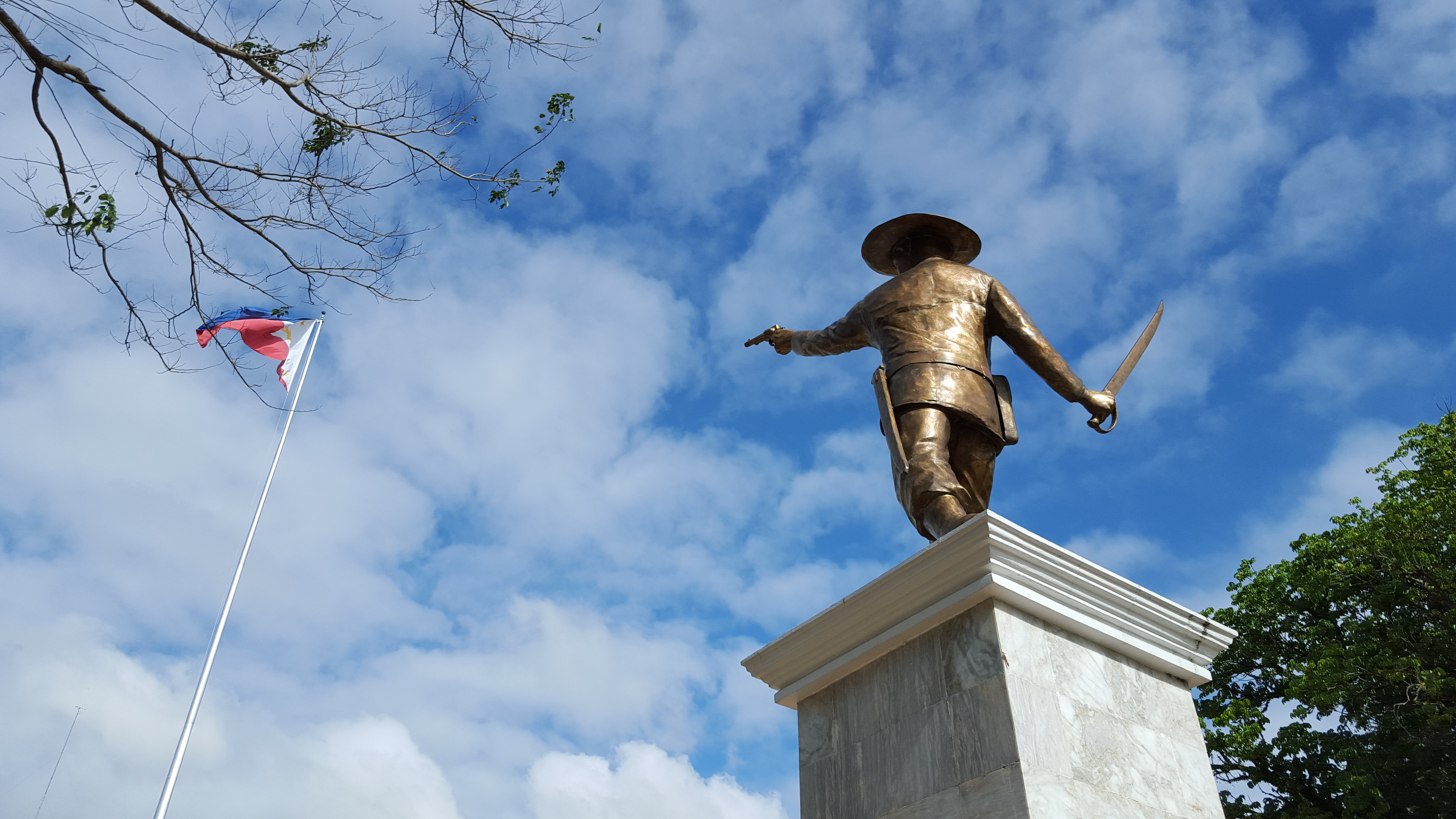
General Martin Delgado Monument

Largest Philippine flag outside Luzon

Santa Barbara Centennial Museum

=== Other attractions ===
The Iloilo Golf and Country Club, located in Barangay San Sebastian, is an 18-hole golf course established in 1907 by British expatriates working on the Panay Railways. It is recognized as the oldest existing golf course in Southeast Asia and one of the first golf clubs in the Philippines.

The Santa Barbara Irrigation Dam, constructed in 1926, is another notable landmark associated with the development of agriculture and irrigation in the municipality.

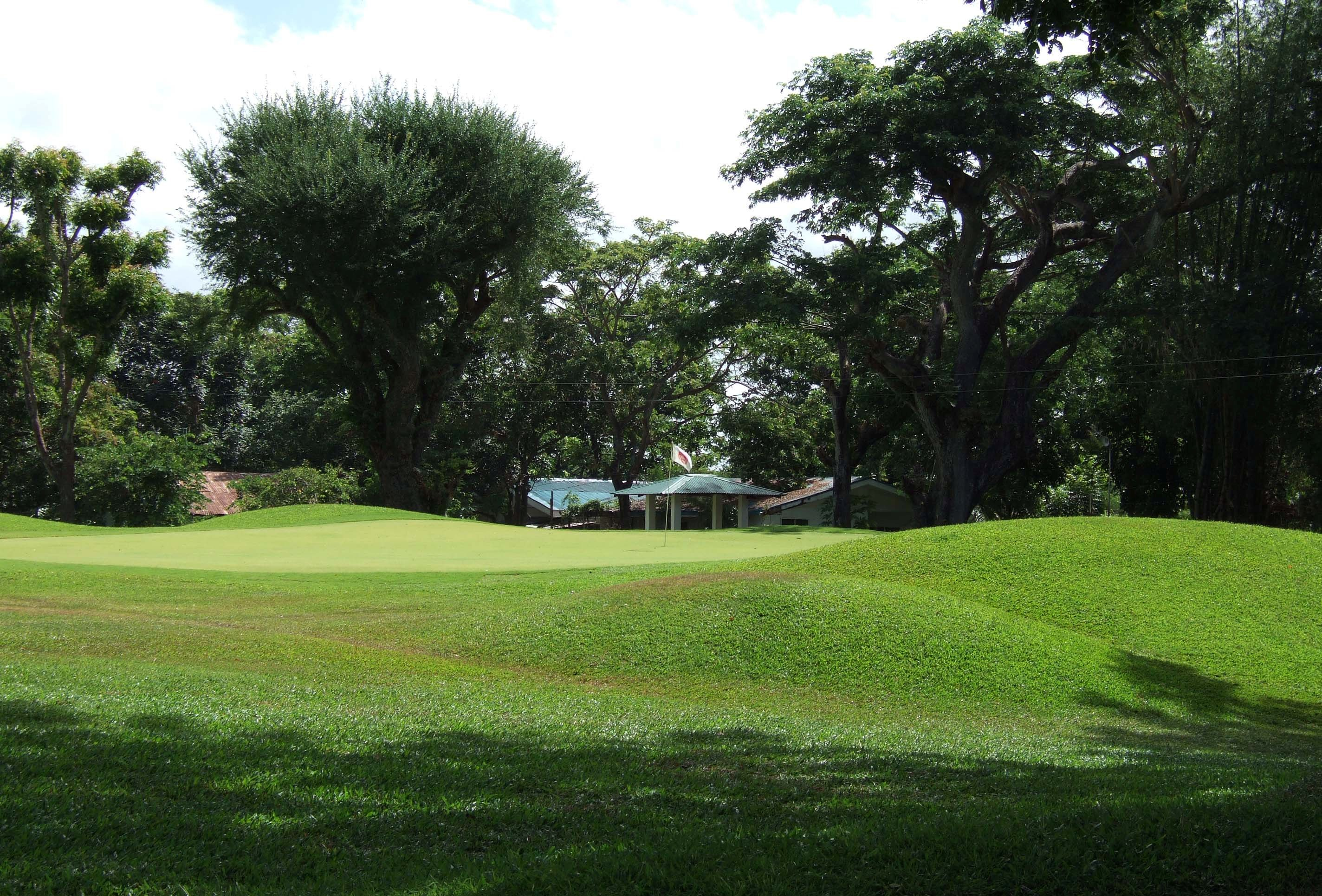
Santa Barbara Golf Course

Santa Barbara Golf Clubhouse

== Infrastructure ==
=== Health ===
Santa Barbara is home to the Western Visayas Sanitarium and General Hospital, a Department of Health (DOH)-managed facility specializing in infectious diseases and providing general medical services. Under Republic Act No. 11723, the hospital's authorized bed capacity was increased from 150 to 300 beds. The municipality also has barangay health stations that provide basic medical services to local communities.

=== Transportation ===
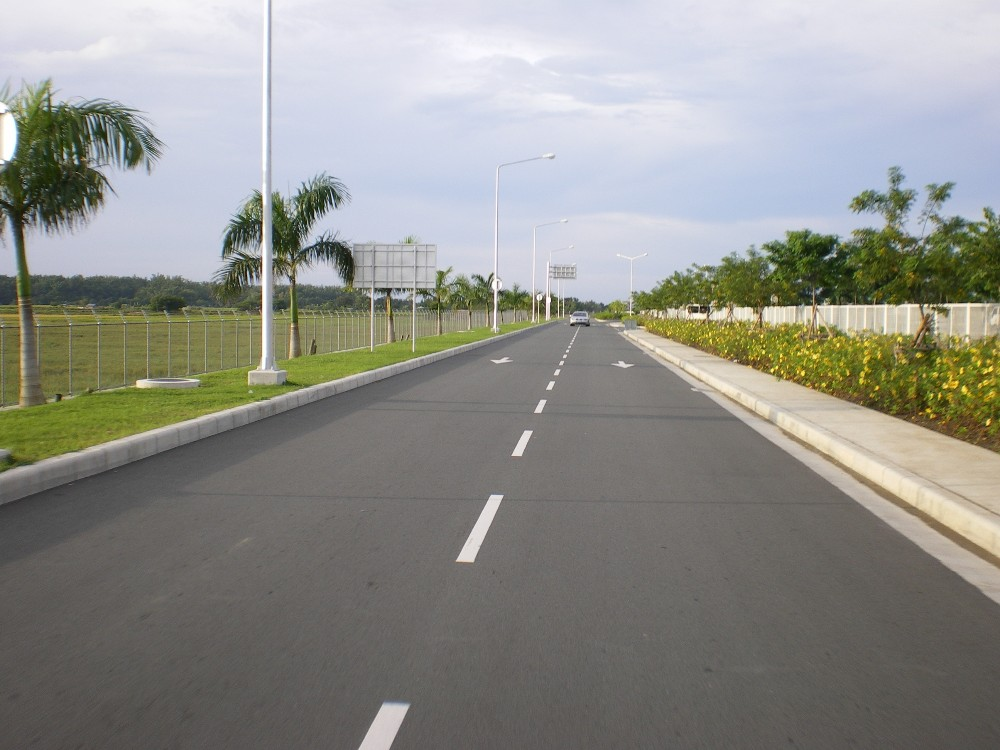
Iloilo International Airport Access Road

Santa Barbara is primarily accessible via Benigno S. Aquino Jr. Avenue, which connects the municipality to Iloilo City. Its road network spans approximately 159.60 kilometres (99.17 mi), consisting of 117.20 kilometres (72.82 mi) of barangay roads, 25.49 kilometres (15.84 mi) of provincial roads, 9.06 kilometres (5.63 mi) of municipal roads, and 7.85 kilometres (4.88 mi) of national highways. Public transportation includes jeepneys, buses, vans, taxis, and tricycles.

The Iloilo International Airport, located in the municipalities of Santa Barbara and Cabatuan, is the fifth busiest airport in the Philippines and provides domestic flights to various destinations in the country, as well as international flights. Its operation has also contributed to the municipality's economic development.

Proposals have also been made to revive the defunct Panay Railways, including a proposed railway station in Santa Barbara. The planned railway would reconnect the municipality with Iloilo City, Roxas City, and Malay, Aklan.

=== Utilities ===
Electricity in Santa Barbara is supplied by the Iloilo Electric Cooperative I (ILECO I). Water distribution is provided by Metro Pacific Iloilo Water (MPIW), a joint venture between Metro Iloilo Water District and Metro Pacific Water.

== Media ==
- 106.7 DYIS Radyo Kahilwayan
