= Santa Barbara Church (Iloilo) =

Roman Catholic church in Iloilo, Philippines

- Santa Barbara Parish Church
- Iglesia de Santa Bárbara (Spanish)
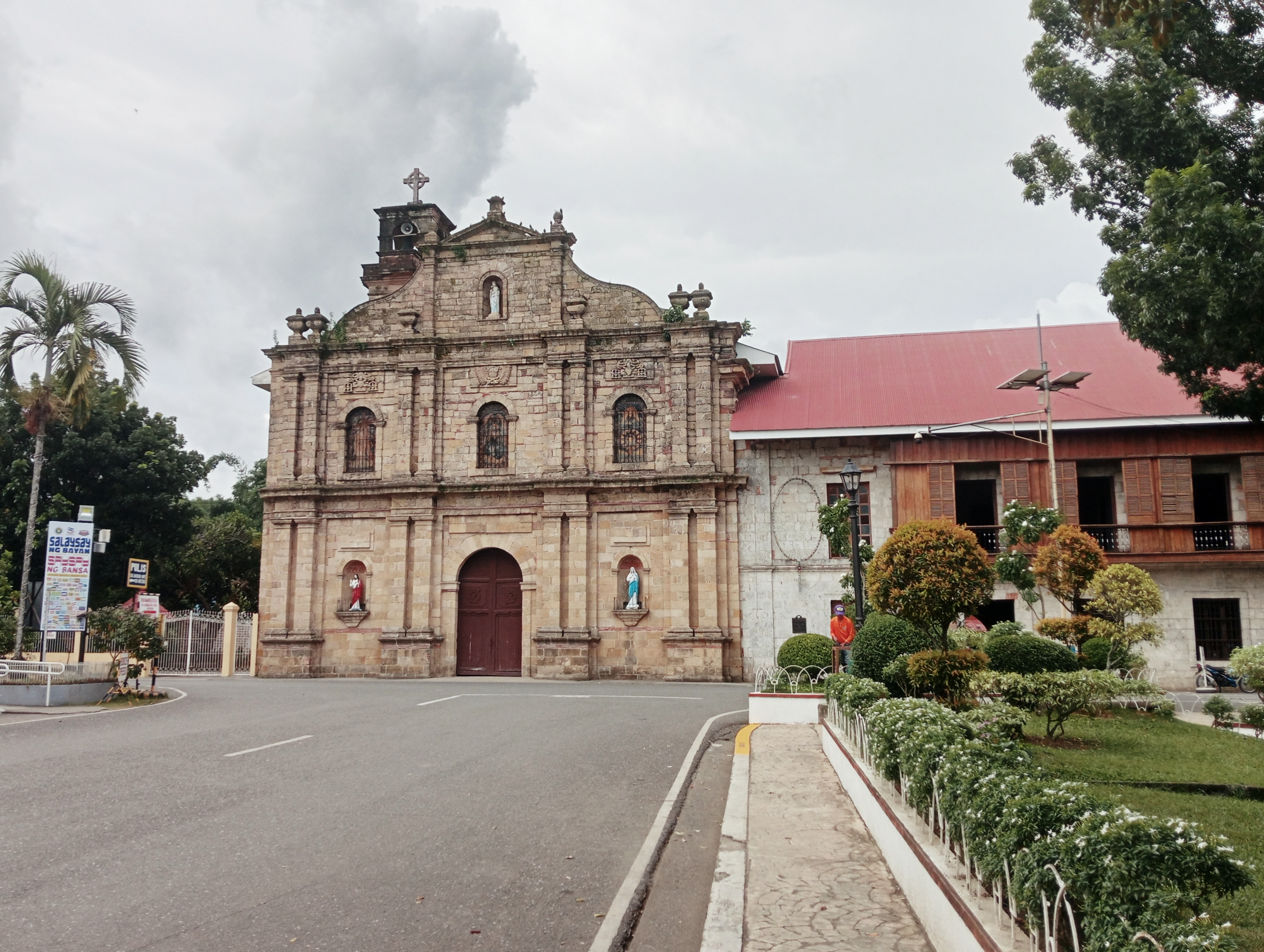
- Church façade and convent in 2024
- Santa Barbara Church
- 10°49′40″N 122°31′55″E
- Location: Santa Barbara, Iloilo
- Country: Philippines
- Denomination: Roman Catholic

History
- Status: Parish church
- Founded: 1760
- Founder: Fr. Juan Ferrer
- Dedication: St. Barbara
- Events: First Cry of Revolution against Spain outside Luzon

Architecture
- Functional status: Under restoration
- Heritage designation: National Historical Landmark, National Cultural Treasure
- Designated: 1991
- Architectural type: Church building

Specifications
- Materials: Bricks

Administration
- Province: Jaro
- Archdiocese: Jaro

Clergy
- Archbishop: Midyphil Billones
- Priest(s): Rev. Msgr. Sinforoso S. Padilla, Jr. P.C.

Santa Barbara Parish Church is a Roman Catholic church located in the municipality of Santa Barbara, Iloilo, Philippines, under the Archdiocese of Jaro. The church is considered to be the "Cradle of Independence" in Panay and in the Visayas.

== History ==
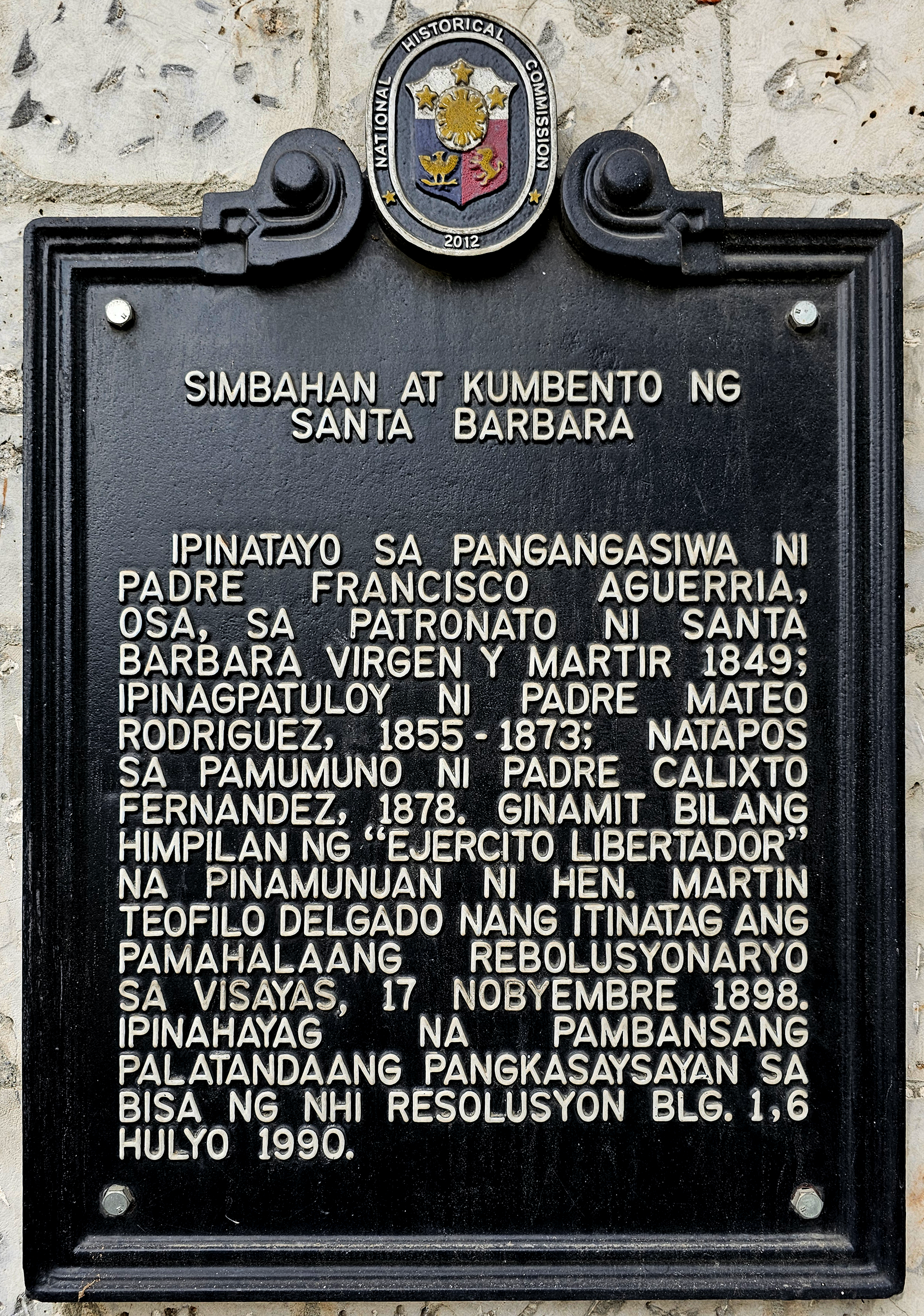
Church and convent NHC historical marker

In 1760, the settlement near the Tigum and Aganan rivers became a Pueblo, and the church became an independent parish. Saint Barbara was assigned to be the symbol of the parish, which was headed by parish priest Father Juan Ferrer. The construction of the Augustinian church that would last to the present day began when Father Francisco Aguerria arrived in 1845. Construction of the road networks that would connect the parish to Cabatuan, Maasin, Janiuay, Leon, and Alimodian also started at the same time.

The funds for the church construction would be sourced out from the taxes of the parishioners that costs between 8 and 12 reales (between ₱1.00 and ₱1.50). Wealthier people escaped labor by paying larger amounts.

Under the laws of Repartamiento, men over 16 years of age were required to engage in 40 days of forced labor doing works on Spanish-owned farms and public works. Laborers from distant towns contributed to the construction of the church. Sketches of the plans and design of the church were drawn on the walls and columns of the church which was believed to not possess any formal plans for its buildability.

Workers labored over both the quarried stones and mulawon and mangle wood-types that both came from the municipalities of Leon, Alimodian and Tubungan.

In 1991, the National Historical Commission of the Philippines declared Santa Barbara Church and Convent as a National Landmark. The church was the site where General Martin Delgado of the Visayan Revolutionary Government started the junta that resulted to the first Cry of Revolution against the Spaniards outside Luzon. It was also used as the general headquarters and military hospital of the revolutionary forces.

The National Museum of the Philippines declared Santa Barbara Church as a national cultural treasure in 2013. A historical marker was unveiled in December 2015.

== Architecture ==
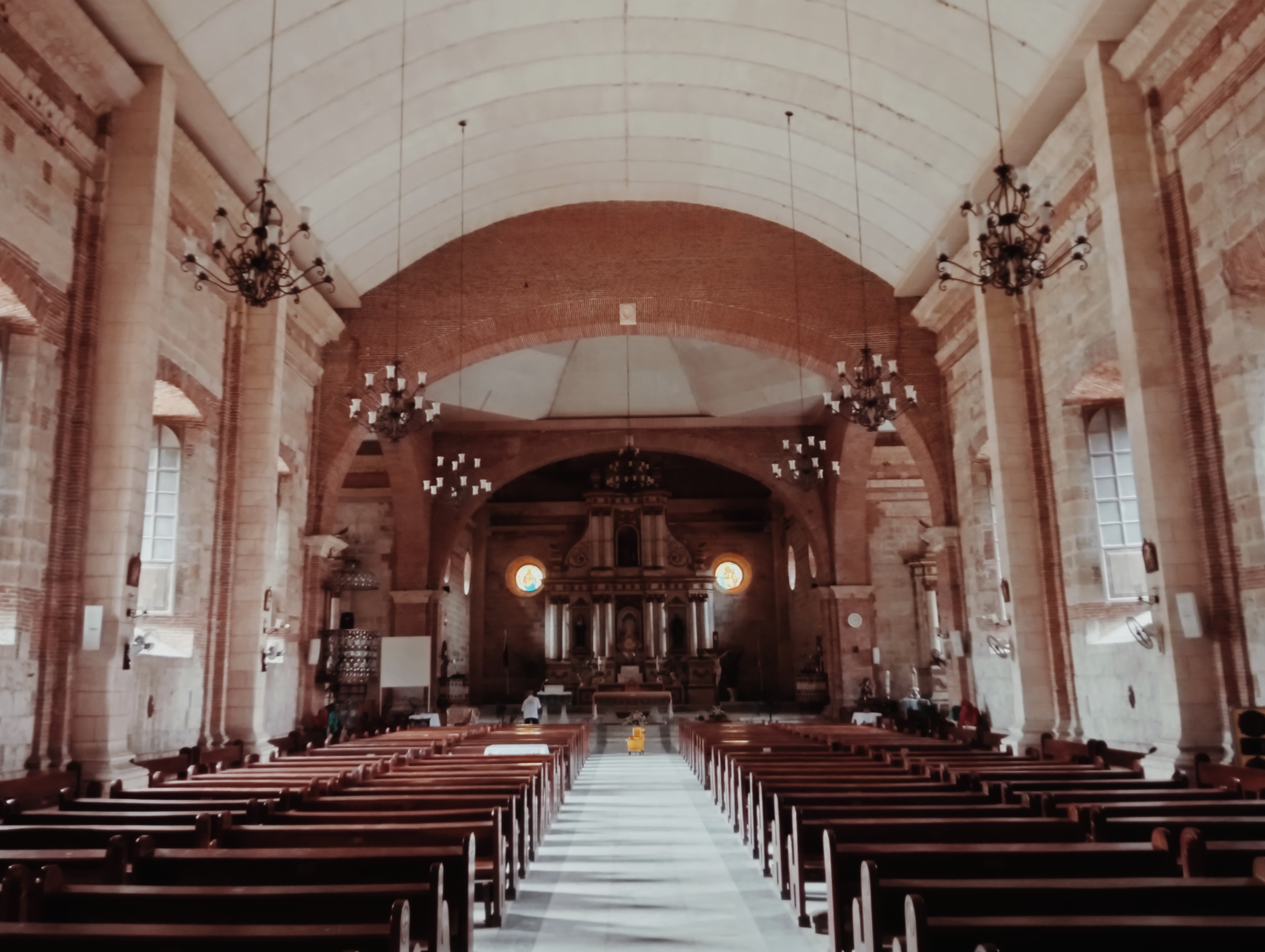
Church interior in 2024

The overall style of the church can be viewed as neoclassical with the unembellished front facade. Dividing the front facade plane are four sets of Tuscan pilasters. The central division contains the main entrance while the end divisions contain two niches accommodating the Blessed Virgin and Sacred Heart of Jesus icons.

Three stained glass windows puncture the facade of the upper level. This fenestration indicates a choir loft located inside. The side windows are capped with crests of the Pope (on the left) and the Augustinians (on the right). On the uppermost part of the front facade is a niche which contains a statue of St. Barbara.

The convent resembles Moorish architecture.

== Restoration ==
Santa Barbara Church and Convent was restored for the celebration of the Philippine Independence Day in 2015. President Benigno Aquino III celebrated the national event in Santa Barbara, Iloilo. The National Historic Commission of the Philippines supervised the restoration of the historic church and convent.

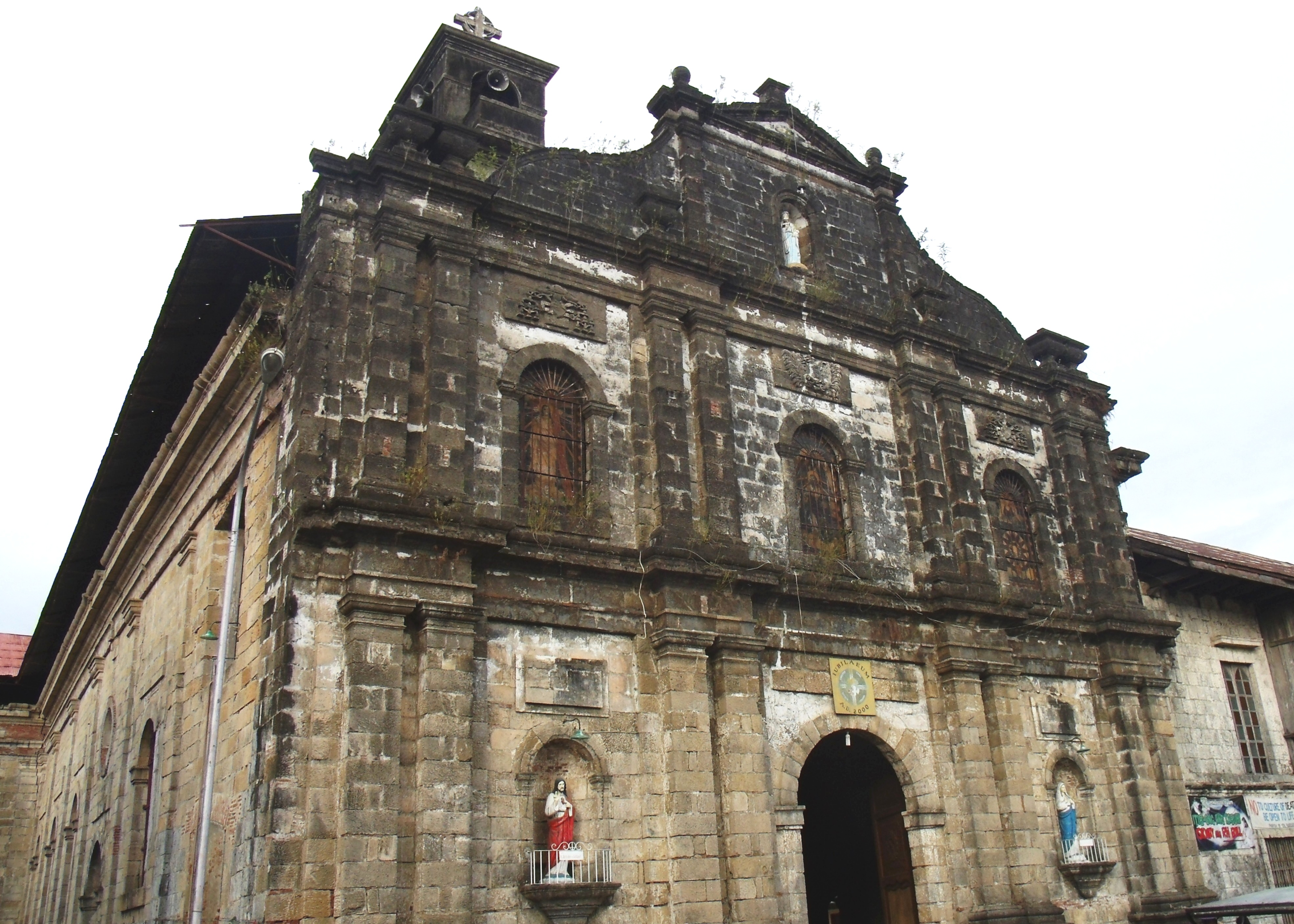
Original facade before restoration

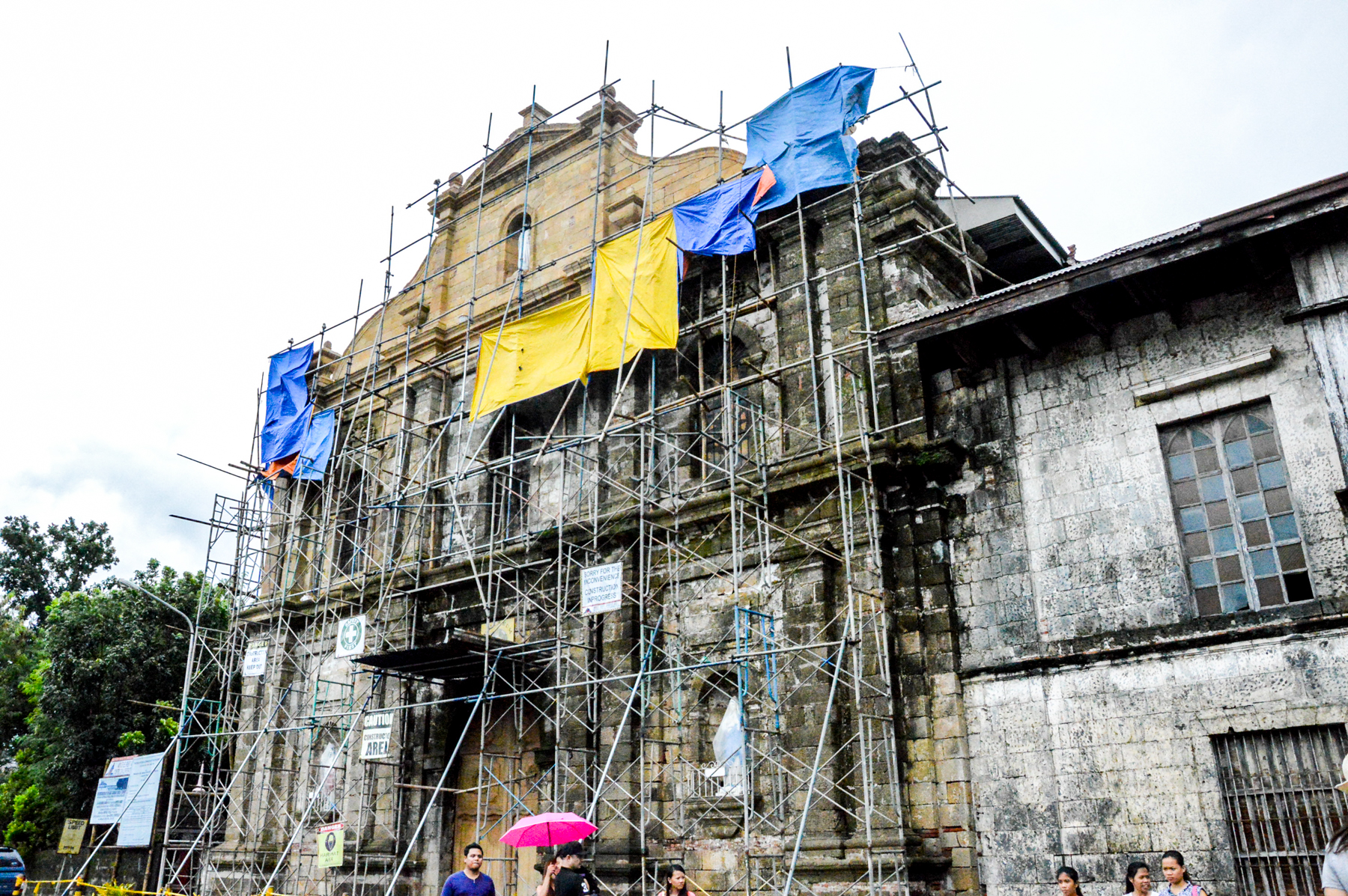
Facade undergoing restoration

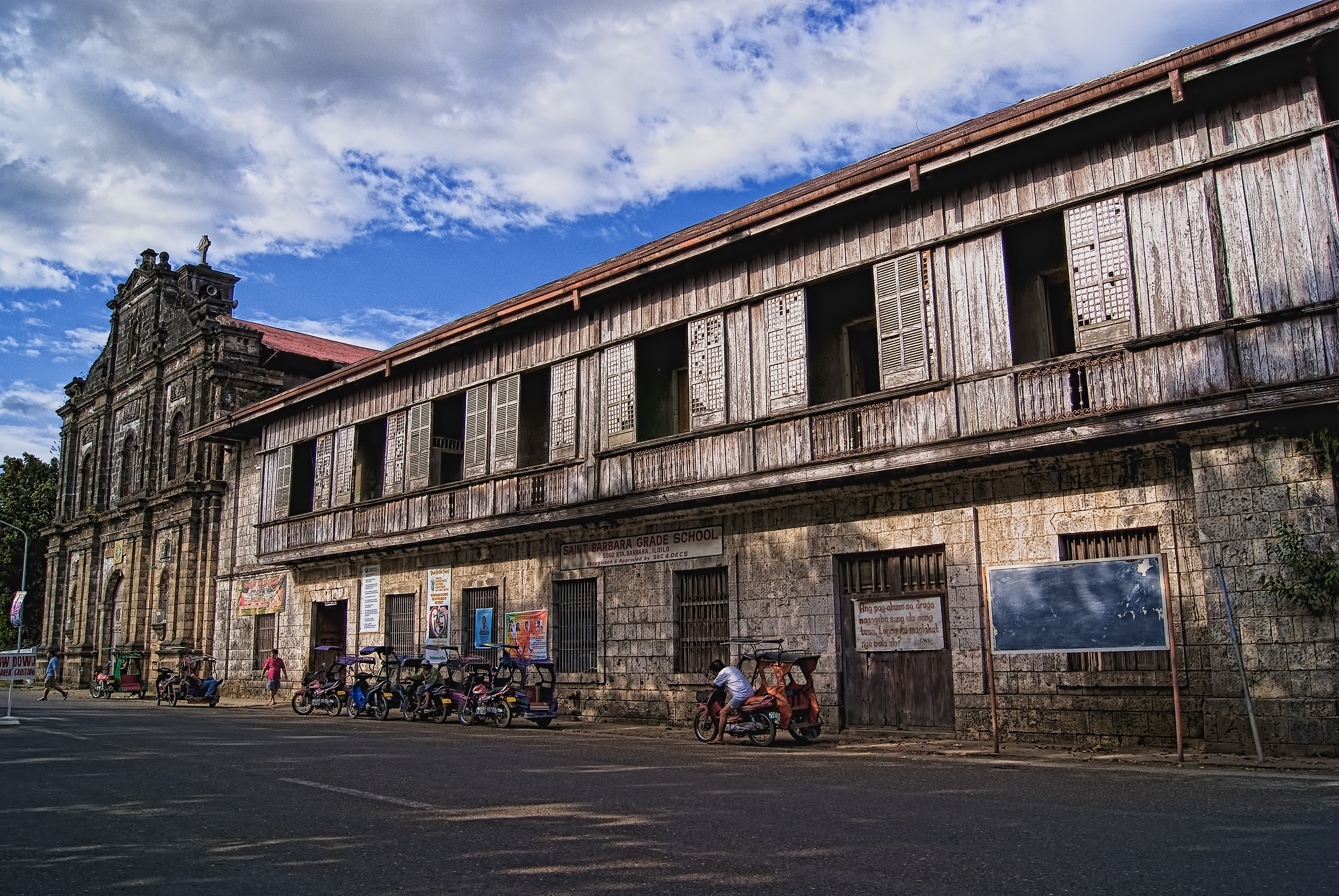
The convent and church, pre-renovation

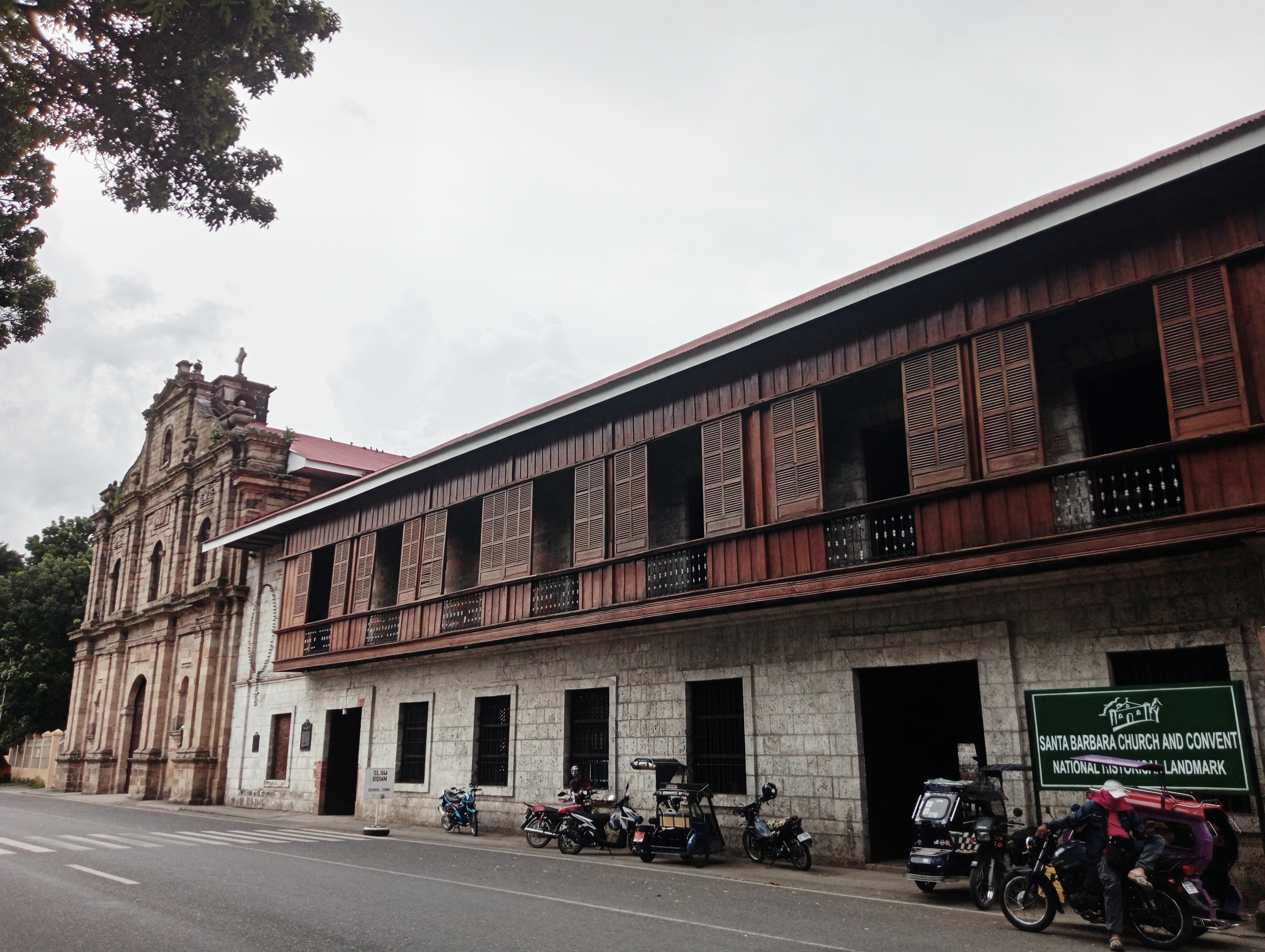
The convent and church, post-renovation
