= Western Visayas Sanitarium and General Hospital =

Government hospital in Iloilo, Philippines

Geography
- Location: Santa Barbara, Iloilo, Western Visayas, Philippines
- Coordinates: 10°48′48″N 122°31′38″E

Services
- Beds: 300

History
- Founded: June 1927; 99 years ago

Links
- Website: wvs.doh.gov.ph

The Western Visayas Sanitarium and General Hospital (WVSGH) is a government hospital in the Philippines. It is located in Barangay Inangayan and Barangay Bolong Oeste, Santa Barbara, Iloilo.

== Western Visayas Sanitarium and General Hospital ==
The Western Visayas Sanitarium and General Hospital (WVSGH) is a Department of Health (DOH)-retained Level II general hospital. Originally established in 1927 as a leprosy treatment facility, it has evolved into a general hospital with a leprosarium and serves as the primary referral center for leprosy patients in Western Visayas.

As of June 2026, the Western Visayas Sanitarium and General Hospital employed a workforce of 585 personnel across its medical, nursing, administrative, and support services.

== History ==
The institution was established in 1927 as one of the eight original sanitaria in the Philippines. It was created to provide treatment and care for persons affected by leprosy who had previously been confined in the Iloilo Provincial Jail. The facility was established on land donated by Rosario Gonzaga de Jesena of Jaro, Iloilo, where patients initially lived in nipa huts. Additional land was later donated and acquired to accommodate the growing patient population.

The first medical personnel included Dr. Goitia, Gil Leonides, and Adriano A. Soliva, a nurse from Culion who became the station's first nurse. As the Segregation Law of Lepers was enforced, the number of patients admitted to the facility steadily increased.

In 1930, Dr. Conelio Consing became Medical Chief and formally named the facility the Western Visayas Treatment Station (WVTS). He introduced improvements to the institution and expanded its operations. In 1934, he was succeeded by Dr. Armando Paras. His administration was marked by conflicts between management and patients, resulting in the deportation of several patients to Culion.

In 1937, Dr. Marciano Carreon assumed leadership and initiated significant reforms. He introduced the Bayanihan System, improved infrastructure through road construction and land development, established recreational facilities, and supported educational programs supervised by Pastor Alberto B. Franco. Social and recreational activities, including scouting and sports programs, were organized to promote community integration among patients.

The institution continued to develop under succeeding medical chiefs. Dr. Emma Asuncion served from 1978 to 1999 and oversaw major institutional improvements. She was succeeded by Dr. Jose Mari Fermin (1999–2002), Dr. Nelson Flotilde (2002–2003), who initiated the hospital's PhilHealth accreditation, Dr. Edgardo Gonzaga (2003–2006), who facilitated funding for a 50-bed general hospital and the establishment of an LTO-accredited drug testing laboratory, and Dr. Faith Daphne Estrada (2006–2008), who began construction of the 50-bed General Hospital and procured additional medical equipment.

Under Dr. Annabelle Pabiona De Guzman, the new 50-bed hospital was completed. In accordance with Department of Health Administrative Order No. 2005-0013, the sanitarium was transformed into a general hospital with a leprosarium, providing services in Internal Medicine, Surgery, Obstetrics and Gynecology, Family Medicine, and Pediatrics. On January 12, 2010, President Gloria Macapagal-Arroyo inaugurated the hospital's main building, officially opening its services to the general public while maintaining its role as the region's primary leprosy referral center.

Following Dr. De Guzman's reassignment in 2014, Dr. Marlyn W. Convocar temporarily assumed leadership until April 2015. She was succeeded by Dr. Rene Feman M. Autajay as Officer-in-Charge, during whose administration New Building Phase I was completed and a new ambulance was acquired.

On April 19, 2016, Dr. Roel Jarina assumed leadership and oversaw the construction of Phases III and IV of the New Building and the acquisition of medical equipment through the Health Facilities Enhancement Program (HFEP). He was succeeded by Dr. Gary Ong in 2017, whose administration initiated the construction of the Outpatient Department (OPD) Building Phase I.

Dr. Judy Ann T. Dumayas assumed office as Medical Center Chief in May 2018. During her administration, the hospital underwent significant modernization and expansion. Infrastructure projects included the construction of a hospital chapel, power house, upgraded utility systems, dialysis facilities, staff housing, isolation facilities, and infectious and non-infectious hospital complexes. The hospital also secured various accreditations, including ISO 9001:2015 certification, Mother-Baby Friendly Hospital accreditation, and TB-DOTS accreditation.

During the COVID-19 pandemic, the hospital expanded its facilities and services to support the regional response through the establishment of isolation wards, dormitories, emergency facilities, and specialized treatment areas. Additional medical equipment was procured through national health programs, while new hospital buildings were completed to increase service capacity.

On April 29, 2022, Republic Act No. 11723 officially converted the Western Visayas Sanitarium into the Western Visayas Sanitarium and General Hospital (WVSGH).

Dr. Dumayas retired from government service on February 10, 2026. She was succeeded by Dr. Stephanie Abello, who was appointed Officer-in-Charge Medical Center Chief II.

== Facilities and Services ==
WVSGH is a Level II Department of Health-retained hospital that provides both general healthcare services and specialized leprosy care. It serves as the principal referral center for leprosy patients in Western Visayas while offering comprehensive medical services to the general public.

The hospital provides services in Internal Medicine, Surgery, Obstetrics and Gynecology, Pediatrics, Family Medicine, and other allied healthcare specialties. It also operates a Malasakit Center and maintains accredited residency training programs in Family and Community Medicine.

WVSGH has an authorized bed capacity of 100 and offers specialized services such as leprosy care, physical medicine and rehabilitation, and computed tomography (CT) scanning. As of 2026, the hospital holds a valid License to Operate issued by the Department of Health, reflecting its compliance with national healthcare standards and regulations.
