= Federal State of the Visayas =

Revolutionary state in the Philippines

Federal State of the Visayas Estado Federal de Visayas (Spanish)
- 1898–1899
- Federal State of the Visayas within the First Philippine Republic.

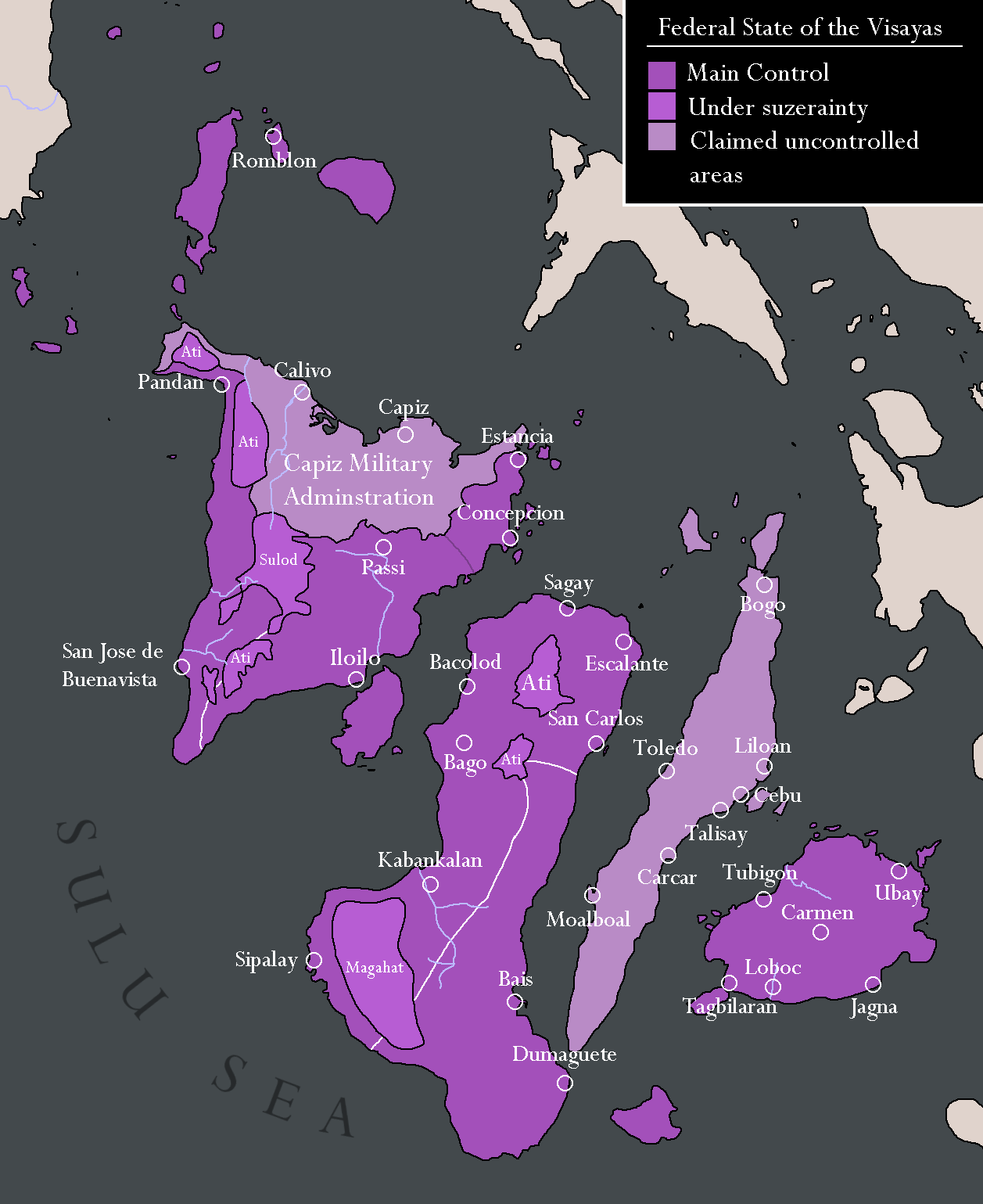
- Territories controlled by the Federal State of the Visayas.
- Status: Autonomous regional government
- Capital: Iloilo City
- Common languages: Spanish and Visayan
- Government: Revolutionary federal state intended as a federated state within a federal republic
- President
  - 1898–1899: Roque López
  - 1899: Jovito Yusay
- Historical era: Philippine Revolution
  - Panay revolt: March 1898
  - Date of Establishment: December 2, 1898
  - Decree abolishing the federal state by Emilio Aguinaldo: April 27, 1899
  - Absorption to the First Philippine Republic: September 23 or October 5, 1899
Preceded by
Provisional Government of the District of Visayas
Cantonal Government of Bohol
Cantonal Government of Negros
Succeeded by
First Philippine Republic
Cantonal Republic of Negros

The Federal State of the Visayas (Spanish: Estado Federal de Visayas, Hiligaynon: Pederal nga Estado sang Visayas, Cebuano: Pederal nga Estado sa Visayas, Filipino: Pederal na Estado ng Visayas) was a revolutionary state in the Philippine archipelago during the revolutionary period. It was a proposed administrative unit of the Philippines under a federal form of government.

== History ==
=== Panay revolt ===
A revolutionary group, the Comité Conspirador (Conspirators Committee), was organized in the town of Molo in Panay island in March 1898. The group, which planned an uprising against the Spanish colonial government, regularly held meetings at the residence of Francisco Villanueva. The organization later became the Comité Central Revolucionario de Visayas (Central Revolutionary Committee of the Visayas) as support for the group grew. They commenced a revolution in Panay in August 1898 and established a temporary revolutionary government in November 1898, which would later be known as the Gobierno Provisional del Distrito de Visayas (Provisional Government of the District of Visayas). The rebels were led by Gen. Adriano Hernandez y Dayot.

The Spanish–American War that was sparked in Cuba reached the Philippines on May 1, 1898, when US Commodore George Dewey defeated a badly supported and equipped fleet of the Spanish Navy in the battle of Manila Bay. Following that defeat, the Spanish designated Iloilo City as the colonial government's capital after Manila fell to the Americans on August 13, 1898, and later installed Roque López as president of the provisional government in Santa Barbara town in Iloilo. Diego de los Ríos was named Governor General over the Philippines. The Spanish armed the Iloilo Voluntarios (Iloilo Volunteers), a battalion composed mainly of Ilonggos believing that they are loyal to the Spanish crown. However, Ilonggo revolutionaries, calling themselves the "Ejército Libertador" (Liberation Army), started a revolt gaining control of all of Panay within days, except for Iloilo, Jaro, La Paz and Molo.

=== Malolos Congress ===
The Panay government, along with the two cantonal governments and other governments in Leyte and Samar were represented in the Malolos Congress which ratified the declaration of Philippine Independence although they had reservations in regards to the Malolos-based government by President Emilio Aguinaldo. Within the month when the congress was convened, these governments recognized the authority of the Malolos Government but retained governance over its jurisdiction. The Visayas governments still had the ability to exercise taxation and maintain their own armies.

=== Provisional government ===
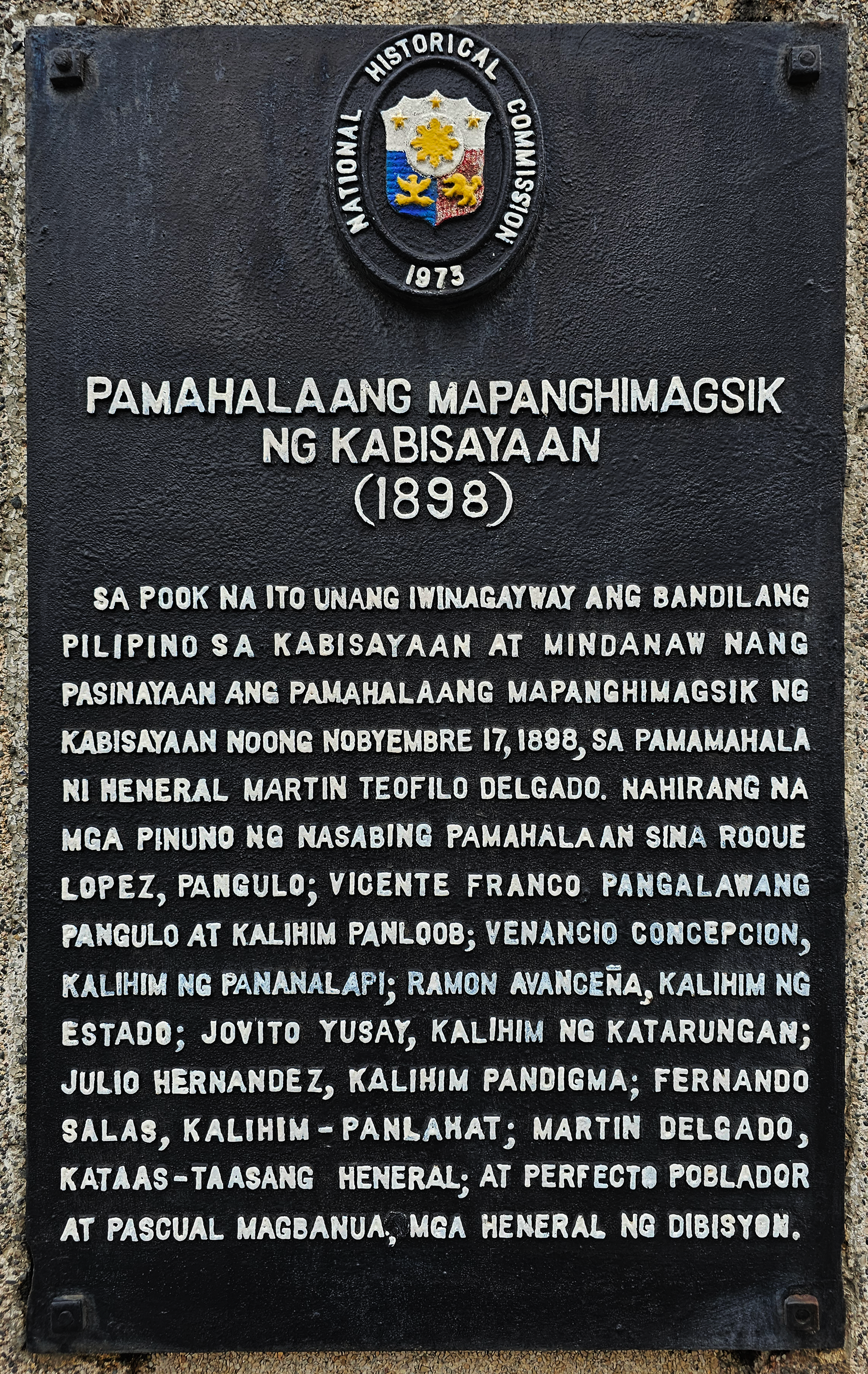
National historical marker installed in 1973 in Santa Barbara commemorating the inauguration of the state

A convention was held at Santa Barbara town on November 17, 1898 which saw the establishment of a provisional revolutionary government with Roque Lopez elected as president. The Philippine flag was raised on a bamboo hoist at the Bermejo house at the town plaza.

At least two other governments were established in the Visayas; The Cantonal Government of Bohol in August 1898 and the Cantonal Government of Negros in November 1898.

=== Formation ===
Predecessor governments of the federal state: Provisional Government of the District of Visayas Cantonal Government of Negros Cantonal Government of Bohol Cebu, under revolutionary control by December 1898

Visayas-based leaders proposed that an independent Philippine nation be a federation. To promote this ideal, the Cantonal governments of Bohol and Negros, as well as the Provisional Government in the Visayas which exercised powers over Panay and Romblon formed the Federal State of the Visayas on December 2, 1898. The governance of the federal state was patterned after the United States federalism and the Swiss confederacy. The government was reportedly created following consultations with Emilio Aguinaldo. Roque Lopez who was the president of the provisional government in Panay became the federal state's president and Iloilo City was designated as the Visayas capital.

Visayas officials made the draft of the terms of surrender of Spanish Governor General Diego de los Rios in December 1898. De los Rios left Iloilo on December 24 and Vicente Gay was installed as mayor of Iloilo City. The city was turned over to the Visayas government. A triumphal parade to Iloilo City was made on Christmas Day which ended in the hoisting of the Philippine flag in Plaza Alfonso XII (now Plaza Libertad) in front of the city hall.

A junta was appointed by the Federal State of Visayas and officials expressed the need to establish a federal republican state over Luzon, Visayas, and Mindanao and maintained allegiance to Aguinaldo. Elections were planned as soon as peace was established.

=== Dissolution ===
The dissolution of the federal state is disputed by various sources. The federal state was abolished by Central government in Malolos by Emilio Aguinaldo on April 27, 1899. Historian Gregorio Zaide says that Jovito Yusay, the last president of the federal state, dissolved the Visayas government on September 23, 1899 by decree. The instigation of the Consejo de Luzon, a Tagalog faction, was the cause of the state's demise at an undetermined date according to the Philippine Revolutionary Records. General Martin Delgado agreed to form a politico-military government after discussing with local military leaders without seeking consent from the civilian federal government on September 21, 1899 and dissolved the federal state on October 5, 1899 by issuing a decree citing Aguinaldo's earlier decree. A politico-military government was installed in Iloilo with Martin Delgado as governor.

The Negros Republic, a component state, later became an American protectorate before it was absorbed into a U.S. administered Philippines.

== Government ==
#	President	Took office	Left office	Vice President
1	Roque López	December 2, 1898	January 7, 1899	Vicente Franco
2	Raymundo Melliza	January 7, 1899	July 16, 1899	Nicolas Jalandoni
3	Jovito Yusay	July 16, 1899	September 23, 1899	Ramón Avanceña

== See also ==
- Federalism in the Philippines
