= Adriano Hernández =

Filipino revolutionary, patriot, and military strategist

The Honorable Adriano Hernández y Dayot
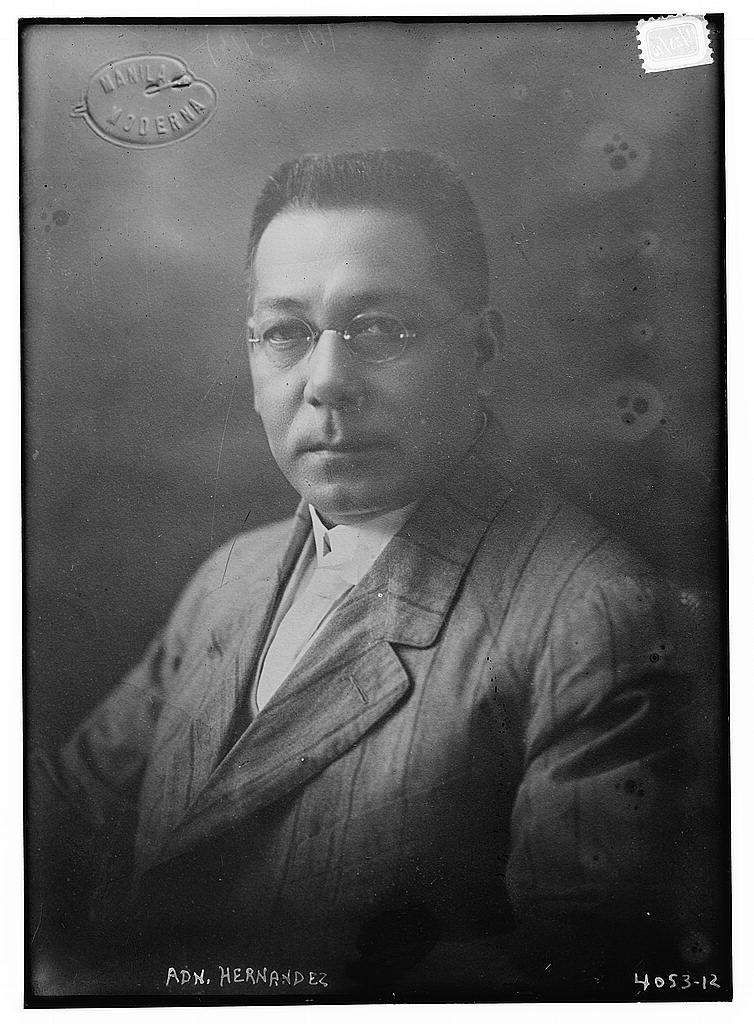
- Hernández in c. 1916

6th Director of Agriculture
- In office 1916–1925
- Preceded by: Harry T. Edwards
- Succeeded by: Stanton Youngberg

Assistant Director of Agriculture
- In office 1914–1916
- Preceded by: Harry T. Edwards
- Succeeded by: William E. Cobey

5th Governor of Iloilo
- In office 1912–1914
- Preceded by: Ruperto Montinola
- Succeeded by: Amando Avanceña

Member of the Philippine Assembly from Iloilo's 4th district
- In office 1907–1909
- Preceded by: Office established
- Succeeded by: Espiridion Guanco

Chief of Staff of the Ejército Libertador of the Estado Federal de Visayas
- In office November 17, 1898 – September 23, 1899
- President: Roque López; Raymundo Melliza; Jovito Yusay
- Preceded by: Office established
- Succeeded by: Office abolished

Member of the Malolos Congress from Iloilo
- In office September 15, 1898 – November 13, 1899 Serving with Esteban de la Rama, Melecio Figueroa, Venancio Concepcion and Tiburcio Hilario

Personal details
- Born: Adriano Hernández y Dayot; September 8, 1870 Dingle, Iloilo, Captaincy General of the Philippines, Spanish Empire
- Died: February 16, 1925 (aged 54) Manila, Philippine Islands
- Resting place: Mausoleo de los Veteranos de la Revolución
- Party: Nacionalista (1907–1925)
- Spouse(s): Carmen Gavira y Mapa; Guadalupe Dairo
- Children: Lucía; Fernando; Alfonso; José; Ramona; Guillermo; Dolores Strong (adopted); Dolores
- Parent(s): Fernando Hernández (father); Lucía Dayot (mother)
- Education: Ateneo Municipal de Manila
- Occupation: Revolutionary, patriot, military strategist, farmer
- Nickname: El Táctico

Military service
- Allegiance: 1898 Spain; 1898–1899 Federal State of the Visayas; 1899–1901 Philippine Republic; 1904–1925 Insular government
- Branch/service: Ejército Libertador
- Years of service: 1898–1901
- Rank: General de brigada
- Battles/wars: Philippine Revolution: Battle of the Cry of Lincud; Battle of the Cry of Santa Barbara; Battle of Jaro; Philippine–American War: Battle of Sambag; Battle of Tacas; Battle of Balantang

Adriano Hernández y Dayot (Spanish: [aðɾiˈano eɾˈnandes i daˈjot]; September 8, 1870 – February 16, 1925) was a Filipino revolutionary, patriot, and military strategist during the Philippine Revolution and the Philippine–American War.

== Early life ==
Hernández was born in Dingle, Iloilo on September 8, 1870, to Fernando Hernández, a soldier from Valladolid, Spain, and Lucía Dayot of the landed and prominent Dayot family of the principalía class of Dingle. His maternal grandfather, Don Juan Marcelino Dayot, and uncle, Don Luís Cantalicio Dayot, had served as gobernadorcillos of Dingle, respectively, in 1829–1835 and 1853–1861, 1869–1873. Juan Marcelino was the teniente mayor (deputy gobernadorcillo) of Laglag who was highly instrumental for the re-establishment of Dingle as a pueblo in its own right in 1823, while Luís Cantalicio, the longest-serving gobernadorcillo of Dingle, sold a number of his vast landholdings to pay for the tributes of his constituents during his years in office as town head. Both gobernadorcillos contributed to the construction of the Dingle Church.

Hernández was a Spanish mestizo who studied at the Escuela Católica de Dingle (Dingle Catholic School) and later at the Ateneo Municipal in Manila. His elder brother, Gen. Julio Hernández y Dayot, later became the Secretary of War of the Federal State of the Visayas during the revolutionary period. His two younger siblings were Consuelo and Pilar.

Hernández was fully engaged in agriculture from 1890 until October 1898 when the second phase of the Philippine Revolution against Spain during the Spanish–American War broke out in the Visayas.

== Military career ==
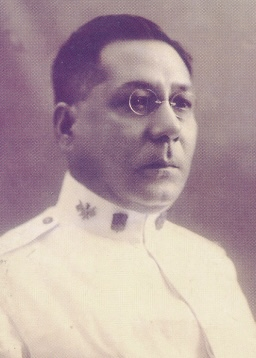
Gen. Adriano Hernández y Dayot, Hero of the Cry of Lincud

During the Philippine Revolution, Hernández organized a revolutionary movement in Iloilo against the Spanish colonial authorities and then from 1898, against the United States. He was the leader of the "Cry of Lincud," which formally launched the Philippine Revolution in Iloilo on October 28, 1898, at the house of his maternal uncle, José Dayot, at Barrio Lincud in Dingle, along with his older brother Gen. Julio Hernández y Dayot, his first cousin and aide-de-camp Maj. Estefano Muyco y Dayot, Maj. Nicolás Roces, Lt. Col. Francisco Jalandoni, and Col. Quintín Salas who fought together with 600 revolucionarios. This victorious event is known today as the first armed uprising and declaration of revolution for Philippine independence in the island of Panay.

Hernández then became an aide to General Martín Delgado because of his knowledge in military strategy. He represented the province of Iloilo at the Malolos Congress and was designated Chief of Staff of the revolutionary government in the Visayas in November 1898.

During the Philippine–American War, Hernández led the guerrilla movement in the province until his surrender in 1901.

== Post-war life ==
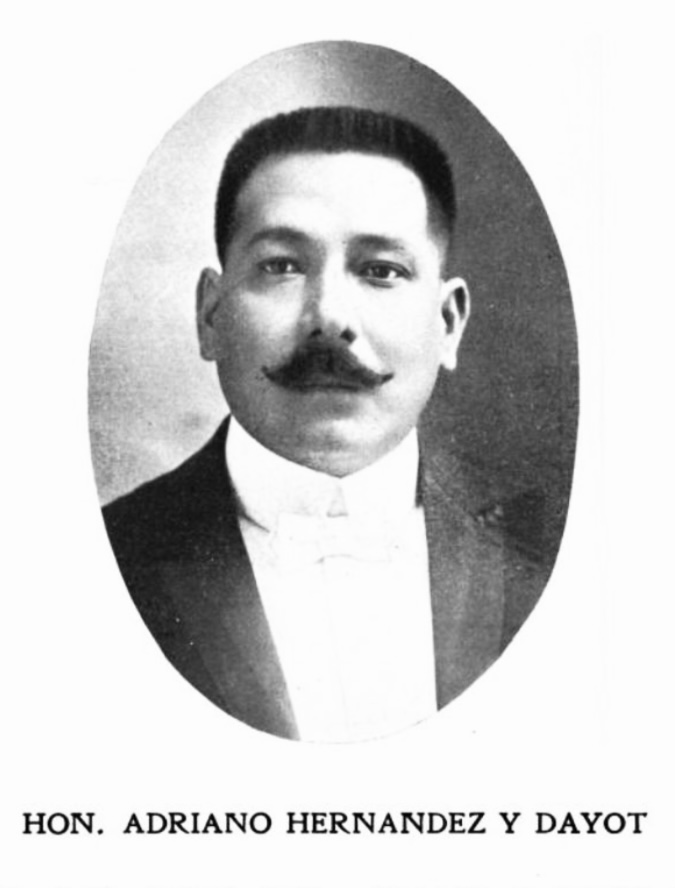
Portrait of Adriano Hernández y Dayot in 1908 from the "Album histórico de la primera Asamblea Filipina"

Hernández declined to hold public office under the Americans in 1901 following his surrender. After the revolution ended with his properties destroyed, he emigrated with his family to Negros Occidental where he managed the Compañía General de Tabacos de Filipinas for seven years. He was the premier town councilor of Silay, Negros Occidental from 1904 to 1906. In 1907, he became a member of the first Philippine Assembly, the first nationally elected legislative body in the Philippines which was the lower house of the Philippine Legislature of the American colonial Insular Government as a member of the Nacionalista Party for Iloilo's 4th legislative district, which was dominated by the hacendado class who owned the vast hacienda estates that made up most of the cultivated land in the Philippines. In 1912, he was elected as the fifth governor of Iloilo. Halfway through his term of office as Iloilo governor, he resigned from his gubernatorial post after the American colonial government offered to appoint him as director of Agriculture. He requested that he be appointed to the position of Assistant Director of Agriculture first, serving in such capacity from 1914 to 1916. A practicing farmer, Hernández became the first Filipino director of the Bureau of Agriculture in 1916, which had been headed by American colonial officials before his tenure. This was part of the Filipinization policy of the American colonial government, following the Jones Act of 1916.

Hernández served as Director of Agriculture until his death in February 16, 1925 after his health failed due to relentless work.

== Commemoration ==
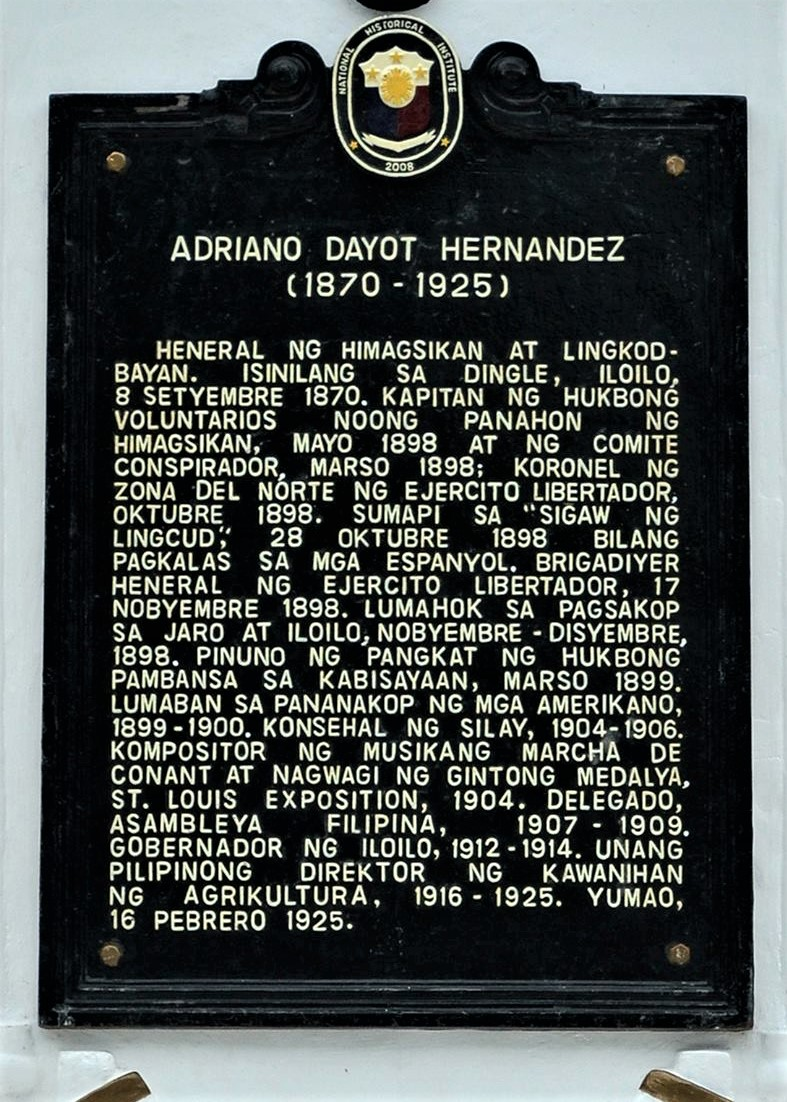
National Historical Commission of the Philippines marker issued in 2008 for the bronze monument of Gen. Adriano Hernández y Dayot located in Dingle town plaza

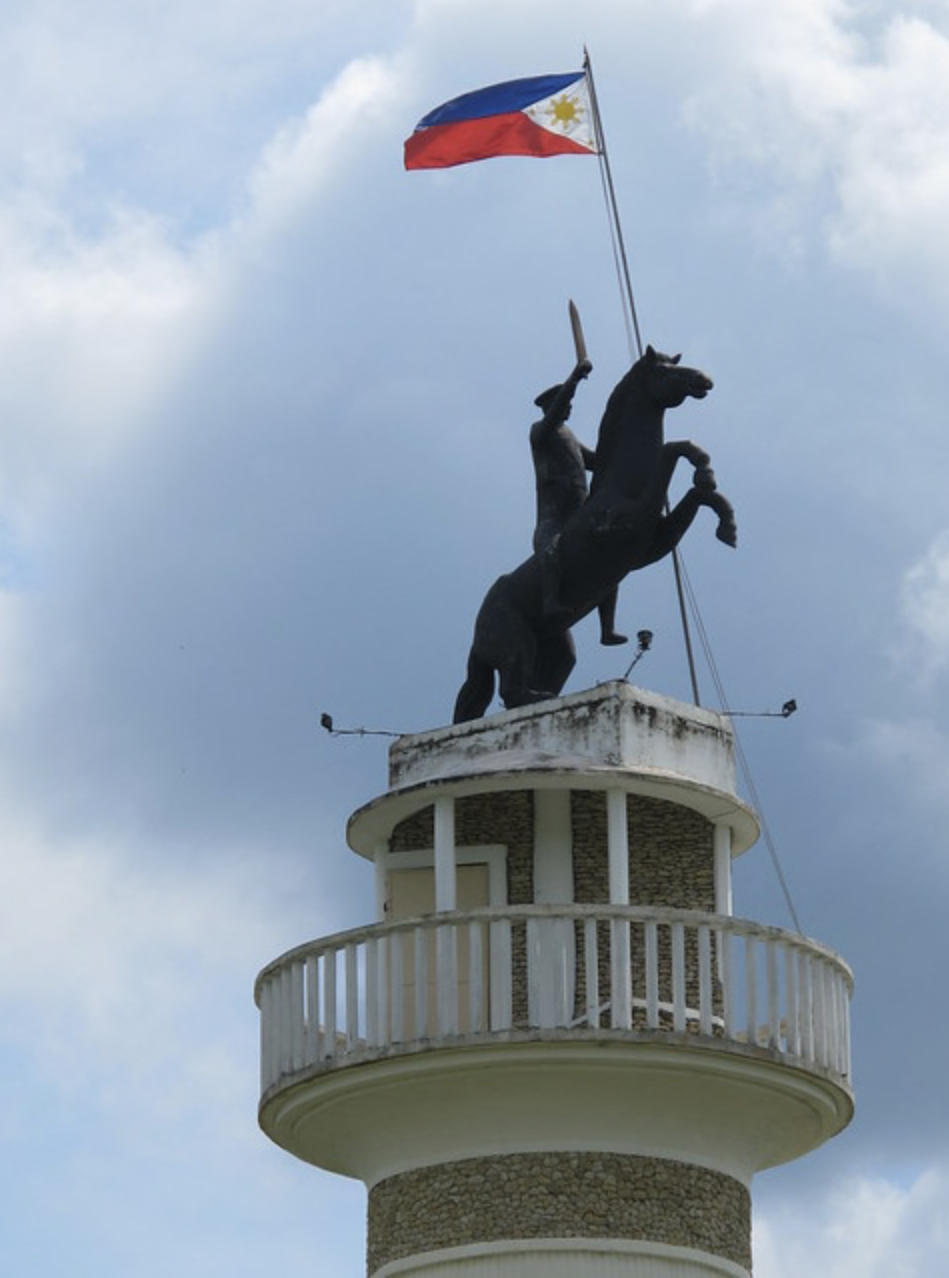
Closeup of the 50-foot (15.24-meter) tall memorial to the Cry of Lincud Heroes in Lincud, Dingle

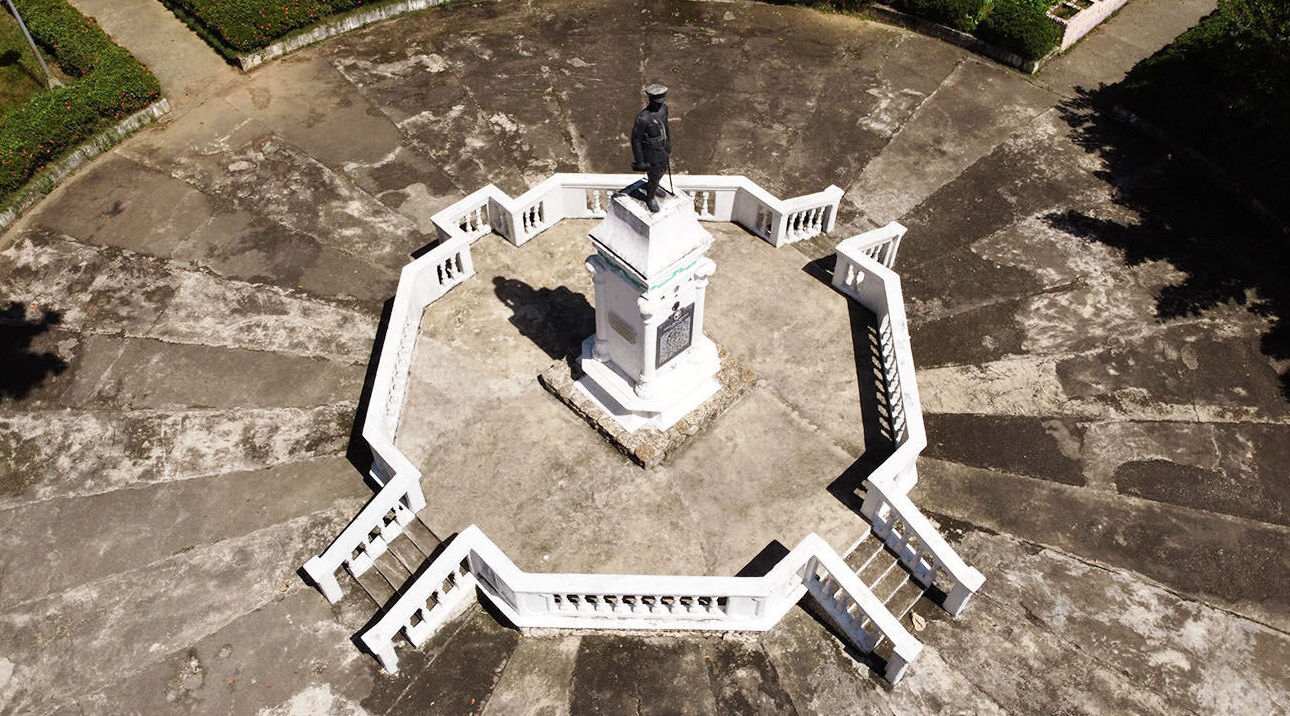
Adriano Dayot Hernandez Shrine at Dingle Town Plaza erected in 1931

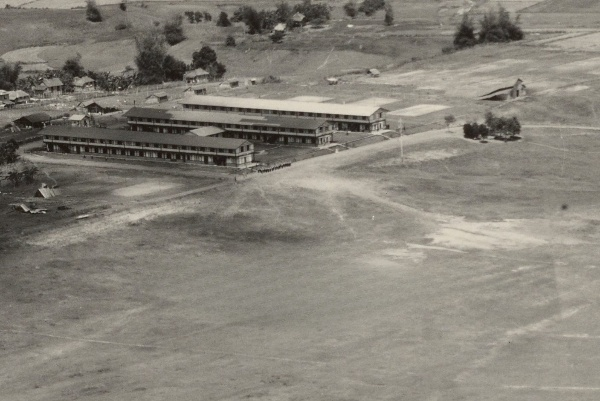
The initial seven-hectare grassland donation of then Dingle municipal president Luís R. Dayot to the Dingle Citizen Army Training Center in 1945, later the 37-hectare Philippine Army camp named in honor of Gen. Adriano Hernández y Dayot, established upon the request of Dingle municipal mayor Julio Muyco y Dayot

- Camp General Adriano D. Hernandez in Dingle, Iloilo was named in his honor. It serves as headquarters of the 301st Infantry Brigade of the 3rd Infantry Division of the Philippine Army. The initial seven hectares of grassland of the 37-hectare military training camp was donated by his first cousin, Dingle municipal president Don Luís R. Dayot, to form the said military camp several years before World War II.
- The Cry of Lincud Heroes memorial in Lincud, Dingle was erected in his honor on the site of the initial uprising.
- The Gen. Adriano Dayot Hernandez monument is a bronze monument located in the Dingle town plaza erected in 1931 in his honor, during the term of office of Dingle municipal president Cipriano J. Montero, Sr., and completed under the administration of municipal president Julio Muyco y Dayot. A National Historical Commission of the Philippines marker was issued in 2008 for the bronze monument.
- Hernandez Street, the main thoroughfare in Poblacion, Dingle, was named in his honor.

== Personal life ==
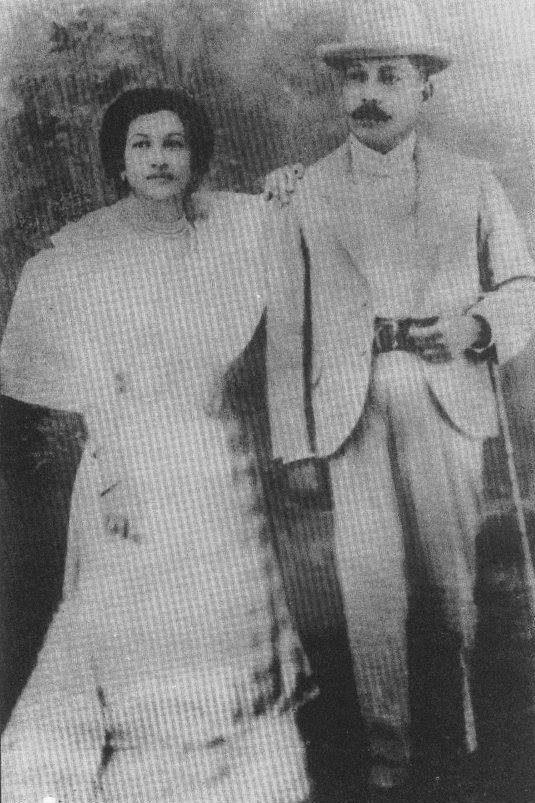
Carmen Gavira de Hernández and Gen. Adriano D. Hernández as Iloilo 4th District representative to the first Philippine Legislature in 1907

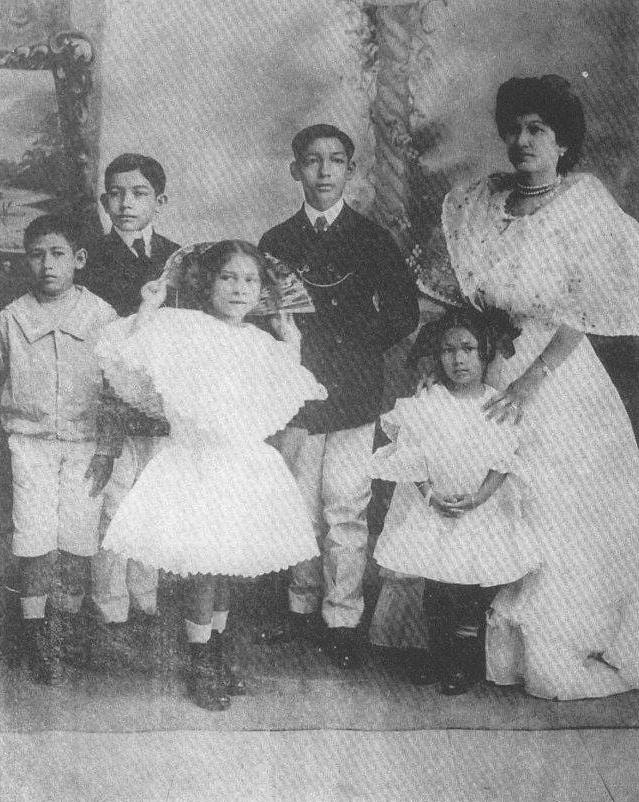
Carmen Hernández and her children: Alfonso, Fernando, Lucía, José, and Ramona

Hernández married Carmen Gavira y Mapa of Jaro, Iloilo, a niece of Victorino Mapa who was the second Chief Justice of the Supreme Court of the Philippines. Hernández had six children with her: Lucía, Fernando, Alfonso, José, Ramona, and Guillermo.

Lucía married Ángel Manzano of Teverga, Spain. Tingting Cojuangco and Edu Manzano descend from this line. Fernando became Presiding Justice of the Court of Appeals. Alfonso, who was involved with the Bureau of Plant Industry, married María Estrella Macandita R. Dayot, his father's first cousin and daughter of Dingle gobernadorcillo Luís Cantalicio Dayot. José, a national poet and writer in Spanish, was the 1927 Premio Zóbel awardee for his poem Lo que vimos en Joló y en Zamboanga. Ramona married Alejandro Legarda, Sr. The couple owned one of the first Art Deco houses in Manila built in 1937. Another son, Guillermo, was a Spanish, English, and Filipino sportscaster and sports editor.

Adriano and Carmen had an adopted daughter, Dolores Strong Hernández. Hernández also had another daughter with Guadalupe Dairo, Dolores D. Hernández, who became a town councilor of Dingle.

== Ancestry ==
Ancestors of Adriano Hernández

2. Fernando Hernández
1. Adriano Hernández
4. Juan Marcelino Dayot
3. Lucía Dayot
5. Faustina del Rosario
