= Martín Teófilo Delgado =

Filipino military leader

Martín Teófilo Delgado y Bermejo
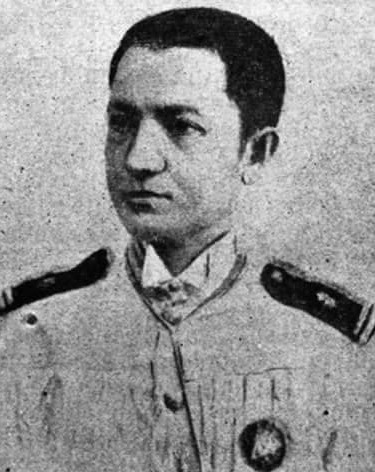

1st Governor of Iloilo
- In office 1901–1904
- Preceded by: Ricardo Monet
- Succeeded by: Raymundo Melliza

Personal details
- Born: November 11, 1858 Santa Barbara, Iloilo, Captaincy General of the Philippines
- Died: November 12, 1918 (aged 60) Culion, Palawan, Philippine Islands
- Occupation: revolutionary, patriot

Martín Teófilo Delgado y Bermejo (Spanish: [maɾˈtin teˈofilo ðelˈɣaðoj βeɾˈmexo] : November 11, 1858 – November 12, 1918) was a Filipino military leader during the Philippine Revolution and the Philippine–American War, and was the first civilian governor of Iloilo Province during the American Occupation of the Philippines, first appointed by the Americans and then winning election in his own right.

== Early life and education ==
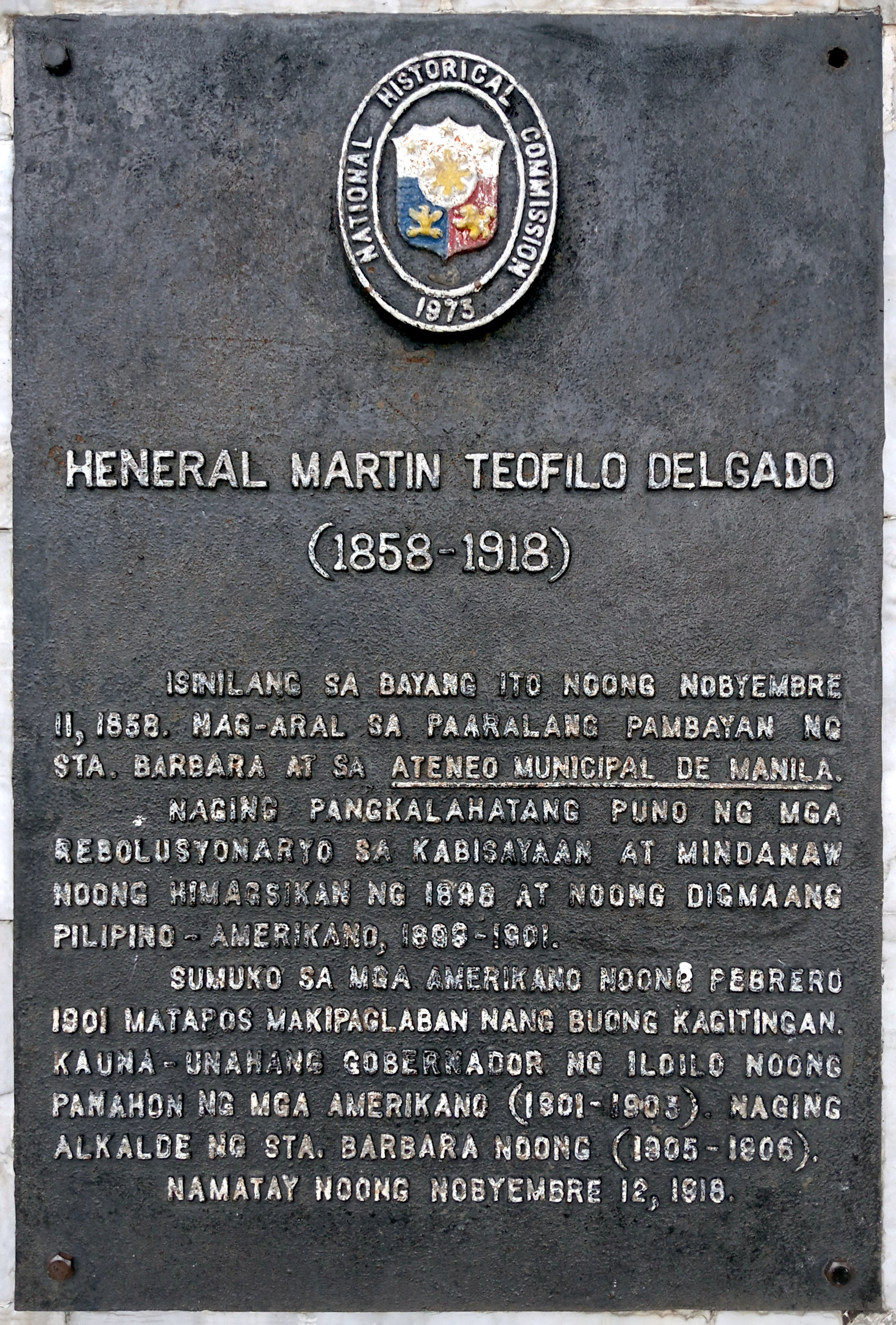
National historical marker installed in 1973 at Delgado's monument in Santa Barbara

Martín Delgado was born on November 11, 1858, in Santa Barbara, Iloilo, Philippines to a rich and aristocratic Spanish mestizo family. His parents were Don Jacinto Delgado and Gabriela Bermejo. He went to school at the Santa Barbara Parochial School, followed by the St. Vincent Ferrer Seminary, then known as Seminario de San Vicente Ferrer, in Jaro, and later Ateneo Municipal in Manila.

== Military and political career ==
At the age of 25, he was appointed teniente mayor of his hometown and capitán municipal, positions under the Spanish colonial government in the Philippines.

On 28 October 1898, Delgado marched into Santa Barbara and took control of the municipal building. On that same day, simultaneously uprisings took place in towns across Iloilo. On 17 November 1898, Delgado was promoted to Lieutenant general. On 24 December 1898, the Spanish forces under the command of General Diego de los Ríos evacuated Iloilo and the Filipino flag was raised on Christmas Day. On 28 December 1898, General Marcus P. Miller leading an American force arrived to conquer Panay. Assisted by warships from Admiral George Dewey's command, they lowered the Filipino flag and hoisted the flag of the United States, signifying American control.

General Delgado encouraged the Filipino troops to revive their nationalist cause. As the military governor of the province and General-in-Chief of the army, he challenged the American forces led by General Hughes using guerrilla tactics. Eventually, leading citizens of Iloilo wrote a circular urging General Delgado to surrender for the benefit of "the victims of useless resistance."

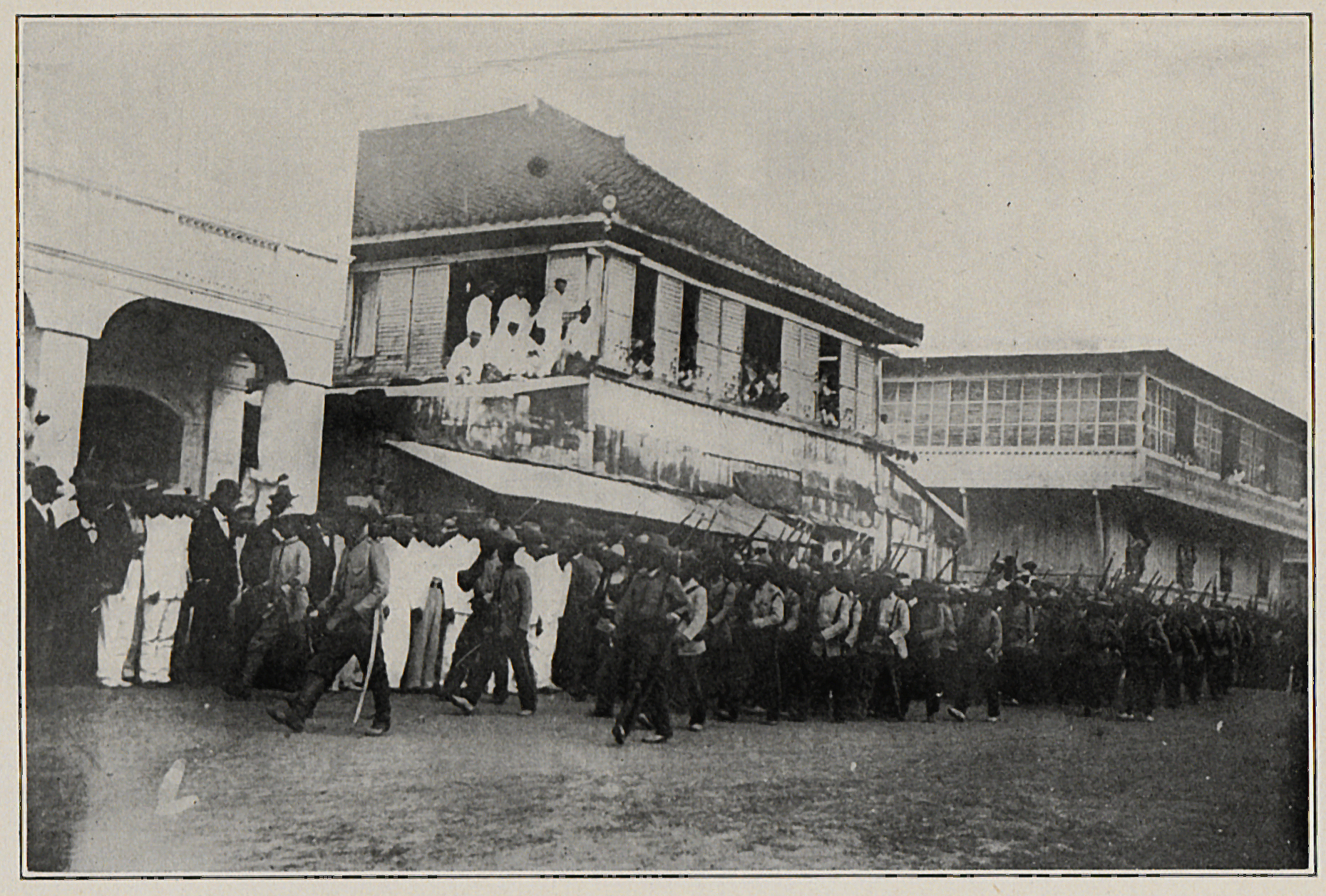
Gen. Martín Teófilo Delgado marching into Jaro (Iloilo) on 2. Feb. 1901 ahead of 30 officers and 140 men to surrender to Brig. Gen. Edmund Rice, US military governor of Panay and Brig. Gen. Robert P. Hughes, regional commander of the US occupying forces.

On February 2, 1901, General Delgado formally surrendered in Jaro to the American military governor, Edmund Rice. Up to the time of his surrender, Delgado was the chief Revolutionary leader on the island of Panay. He was recognized by the Americans as "the ablest leader" on the island and appointed as the first Governor of Iloilo province upon the establishment of the civil government on 11 April 1901.

On 3 March 1902, the first local election was held, and he was elected governor of Panay. He served until March 1904.

After his term, he returned to his hometown of Santa Bárbara. Not long after, he was exiled to Culion, where he served a superintendent of a leprosy sanatorium. He died in Culion on 12 November 1918 at the age of 60. Delgado Street in the city of Iloílo is named after him. In 1998, on the centennial of the Philippine declaration of independence, a statue was erected in his honor in the main square of his hometown Santa Bárbara. In 2019, an equestrian statue of Delgado, made by Spanish Sculptor Ginés Serrán-Pagán, was also erected in front of the Casa de Emperador at the Iloílo Business Park.
