= Legislative districts of Iloilo =

Legislative district of the Philippines

The legislative districts of Iloilo are the representations of the province of Iloilo in the various national legislatures of the Philippines. The province is currently represented in the lower house of the Congress of the Philippines through its first, second, third, fourth and fifth congressional districts.

The highly urbanized city of Iloilo City and the province of Guimaras were last represented as part of Iloilo in 1986 and 1995, respectively.

== History ==
Iloilo was divided into five representative districts in 1907. Minor adjustments were made to the composition of the third, fourth, and fifth districts through Act No. 3036 enacted on March 9, 1922. When seats for the upper house of the Philippine Legislature were elected from territory-based districts between 1916 and 1935, the province formed part of the seventh senatorial district which elected two out of the 24-member senate.

In the disruption caused by the Second World War, two delegates represented the province in the National Assembly of the Japanese-sponsored Second Philippine Republic: one was the provincial governor (an ex officio member), while the other was elected through a provincial assembly of KALIBAPI members during the Japanese occupation of the Philippines. Iloilo City, being a chartered city, was represented separately in this short-lived legislative body. Upon the restoration of the Philippine Commonwealth in 1945, the province retained its five pre-war representative districts.

The province was represented in the Interim Batasang Pambansa as part of Region VI from 1978 to 1984. In 1984 the province elected five representatives, at large, to the Regular Batasang Pambansa.

The province, excluding the highly urbanized of city of Iloilo, was reapportioned into five congressional districts under the new Constitution which was proclaimed on February 11, 1987. The five districts elected members to the restored House of Representatives starting that same year. Iloilo City also elected its own representative in the 1987 election.

On May 22, 1992 the Provincial Board of Canvassers of Iloilo affirmed the results of the May 11, 1992 plebiscite on the proposed establishment of Guimaras (a sub-province of Iloilo since 1966) as a regular province by virtue of Section 462 of Republic Act No. 7160 (Local Government Code of 1991). Guimaras continued to be represented as part of the second district of Iloilo until it elected its own representative in the 1995 elections.

== Current districts ==
Legislative districts and representatives of Iloilo
District	Current Representative		Party	Constituent LGUs	Population (2020)	Area	Map
District	Image	Name	Party	Constituent LGUs	Population (2020)	Area	Map
1st		Janette L. Garin (since 2019); Miagao	Lakas	List: Guimbal; Igbaras; Miagao; Oton; San Joaquin; Tigbauan; Tubungan	374,726	840.27 km²	
2nd		Kathryn Joyce Gorriceta (since 2025); Pavia	Lakas	List: Alimodian; Leganes; Leon; New Lucena; Pavia; San Miguel; Santa Barbara; Zarraga	346,189	606.88 km²	
3rd		Lorenz R. Defensor (since 2019); Mina	NUP	List: Badiangan; Bingawan; Cabatuan; Calinog; Janiuay; Lambunao; Maasin; Mina; Pototan	456,006	1,405.43 km²	
4th		Ferjenel G. Biron (since 2022); Barotac Nuevo	Nacionalista	List: Anilao; Banate; Barotac Nuevo; Dingle; Dueñas; Dumangas; Passi; San Enrique	402,317	976.95 km²	
5th		Binky April M. Tupas (since 2025); Barotac Viejo	Lakas	List: Ajuy; Balasan; Barotac Viejo; Batad; Carles; Concepion; Estancia; Lemery; San Dionisio; San Rafael; Sara	472,661	1,171.30 km²	

== At-Large (defunct) ==
=== 1943–1944 ===
- Includes Guimaras but excludes Iloilo City

Period	Representative
National Assembly; 1943–1944	Cirilo Mapa, Jr.
National Assembly; 1943–1944	Fermin C. Caram (ex officio)

=== 1984–1986 ===
- Includes Guimaras and Iloilo City

Period	Representative
Regular Batasang Pambansa; 1984–1986	Salvador B. Britanico
Regular Batasang Pambansa; 1984–1986	Fermin Z. Caram, Jr.
Regular Batasang Pambansa; 1984–1986	Arthur D. Defensor
Regular Batasang Pambansa; 1984–1986	Narciso Monfort
Regular Batasang Pambansa; 1984–1986	Rafael Palmares

== See also ==
- Legislative district of Guimaras
- Legislative district of Iloilo City
