= Northern Iloilo State University =

Public university in Iloilo, Philippines

- Pamantasang Pampamahalaan ng Kahilagaang Iloilo (Filipino)
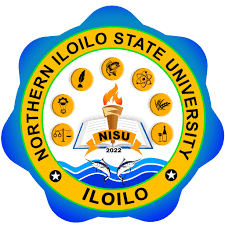
- The University Official Seal
- Other name: NISU
- Former names: Philippine Institute of Fisheries Technology - Western Visayas Branch (1952–1965); Western Visayas College of Fisheries (1965–1983); Northern Iloilo Polytechnic State College (1983–2022)
- Motto: An icon of hope for development
- Type: State University
- Established: July 2, 1956; 70 years ago
- Academic affiliations: PASUC; AACCUP
- President: Dr. Raffy B. Chavez
- Vice-president: Dr. Gilda E. Deguma (Academic Affairs); Atty. Niezel Anen T. Sabrido (Administration & Finance); Dr. Bobby D. Gerardo (Research & Extension)
- Faculty: 408
- Administrative staff: 163
- Students: 14,358
- Location: Estancia, Iloilo, Philippines; 11°27′30″N 123°09′22″E
- Campus: Main: Estancia, Iloilo External Campuses: Ajuy, Iloilo * Barotac Viejo, Iloilo * Batad, Iloilo * Concepcion, Iloilo * Lemery, Iloilo * Sara, Iloilo
- Colours: Blue and Yellow
- Sporting affiliations: SCUAA; ISSAA
- Website: www.nisu.edu.ph
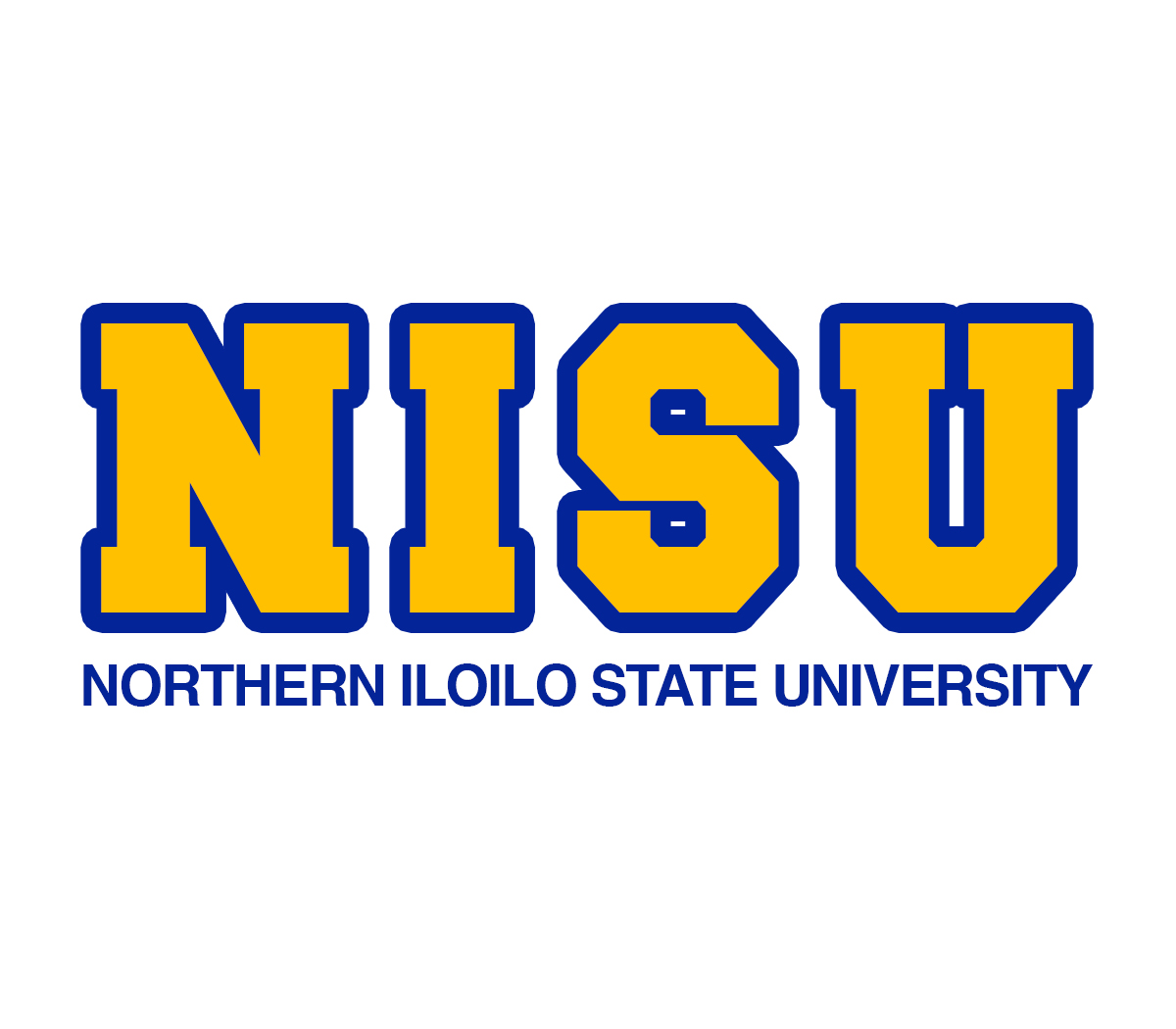

- Location in the Visayas Location in the Philippines

Northern Iloilo State University (NISU) is a state university in the Philippines located in Western Visayas at the province of Iloilo. It is mandated to provide higher and advanced education and training in the fields of education, industrial technology, criminology, agriculture, fishery, hospitality management, engineering, sciences and information technology. It is also mandated to promote research, advanced studies, and progressive leadership in various fields. Its main campus is located in Estancia, Iloilo, Philippines. Prior to its present conversion as a university, it was called Northern Iloilo Polytechnic State College. It was elevated to a university in 2022, through Republic Act No. 10597 as amended by Republic Act 11005, and upon confirmation by the Commission on Higher Education En Banc Resolution no. 222-2022 dated April 26, 2022.

== History ==
The institution was first known as the Western Visayas Branch of the Philippine Institute of Fisheries Technology. The school was authorized in the Omnibus Bill that was enacted as Republic Act No. 687 on May 9, 1952. The school was opened on July 2, 1956. The school was first administered by the director of Fisheries through the superintendent of the Philippine Institute of Fisheries Technology (PIFI). Pursuant to the Reorganization Plan No. 30-A, the school together with six other Secondary Schools of Fisheries existing at the time were transferred to the Department of Education effective January 12, 1957.

In 1963, with the creation of Bureau of Vocational Education by virtue of Republic Act. No. 3742, agricultural, fishery and trade-technical schools were transferred from B.P.S. to the Bureau of Vocational Education.

Republic Act. No. 4349 enacted on June 19, 1965, provided for the conversion of this school to a college, otherwise known as the Western Visayas College of Fisheries. The Estancia High School, a component school of NIPSC, was established in 1949. It was a provincial high school being funded by the provincial government of Iloilo.

On June 10, 1983, President Ferdinand E. Marcos signed Batas Pambansa Blg. 500 – converting and integrating the Western Visayas College of Fisheries and Estancia High School, both of which are in Estancia, into a Polytechnic State College. On August 11, 1989, President Corazon C. Aquino signed R.A. 6747 converting the Barotac Viejo National Agricultural College into a branch of NIPSC to be known as the Northern Iloilo Polytechnic State College Barotac Viejo Campus.

On April 26, 2022, Northern Iloilo Polytechnic State College was elevated into a university, through Republic Act Number 10597 as amended by Republic Act Number 11005 and upon confirmation by the Commission on Higher Education (CHED) En Banc Resolution no. 222–2022. With this conversion, Dr. Bobby D. Gerardo was installed as the first University President of Northern Iloilo State University.

== Campuses ==
NISU consists of a total of 7 Campuses located in the different municipalities of the fifth district of Iloilo. There are two Campuses of the university located in Estancia, Iloilo. The "Main Campus" is situated in V. Cudilla Ave., Estancia Iloilo while the "West Campus" is located in Poblacion Zone 1, Estancia, Iloilo, Philippines.

- Northern Iloilo State University (Main) Estancia, Iloilo
- Northern Iloilo State University in West Campus, Estancia, Iloilo
- Northern Iloilo State University - Ajuy Campus
- Northern Iloilo State University - Barotac Viejo Campus
- Northern Iloilo State University - Batad Campus
- Northern Iloilo State University - Concepcion Campus
- Northern Iloilo State University - Lemery Campus
- Northern Iloilo State University - Victorino Salcedo Campus, Sara

=== Main campus ===
The main campus is situated in the municipality of Estancia.

It is composed of eight colleges with 3, 691 students as of second semester, Academic Year 2018-2019. It has 142 faculty members and 63 members of the administrative services. There are 31 courses offered: 19 Baccalaureate Degrees, 1 two-year Course, Junior and Senior High School, 7 Masteral Degrees and 2 Doctorate Degrees. It also owns a more or less 16 hectares fishpond located at Barangay Lawis, Balasan, Iloilo.

=== Ajuy Campus ===
NISU AJUY Campus is located in Barangay San Antonio, Ajuy, Iloilo. The college is along the national highway with land area of 8 ha.

It offers Bachelor of Science in Criminology which is its banner program. Bachelor of Science in Entrepreneurship, Bachelor of Science in Secondary Education, Bachelor in Elementary Education, and Bachelor of Science in Hotel and Restaurant.

The institution has 40 members of the faculty with 16 males and 24 females and 34 members of the administrative support staff with 17 males and 17 females. It has a total student population of 1, 646 as of second semester, Academic Year 2018-2019. NISU Ajuy Campus was integrated to Northern Iloilo Polytechnic State College in 2001 and now called NIPSC Ajuy Campus. At present, the NISU Ajuy Campus is under the leadership of its campus administrator, Dr. Lebni T. Bernardino, Jr.

=== Barotac Viejo Campus ===
NISU Barotac Viejo Campus is situated in Barangay Puerto Princesa, Barotac Viejo, Iloilo.

It offers Bachelor of Science in Agriculture as its flagship program. It also offers other degree programs: Bachelor of Science in Agriculture, Bachelor in Elementary Education, Bachelor in Secondary Education and Bachelor in Hotel Management. At present, NISU Barotac Viejo has a total of 31 faculty members,18 members of the administrative support staff and 699 students.

On August 11, 1989, the late former Cong. Niel D. Tupas, Sr. of the 5th District, the former Governor of the Province of Iloilo authored a house bill known as R.A. 6747, a Republic Act converting BVNAC to Northern Iloilo Polytechnic State College- Barotac Viejo Campus. Currently, NISU Barotac Viejo is under the watch of its campus administrator, Dr. Ruby S. Yotoko.

=== Batad Campus ===
NISU Batad Campus is situated at the outskirt of the poblacion of the municipality of Batad and a total land area of 60 ha.

Presently, NISU Batad Campus offers Bachelor of Secondary Education, Bachelor of Science in Agriculture, Bachelor of Science in Information Technology and Bachelor of Technology and Livelihood Education. The university has 31 faculty members and 16 members of the administrative staff. It has a total of 457 students as of the second semester, Academic Year 2018-2019.

On October 31, 2000, the college was integrated to Northern Iloilo Polytechnic State College by virtue of CHED Order No. 27 series of 2000 and became NIPSC Batad Campus. Dr. Veminrose A. Clariza-Samuel is the current college administrator of NISU Batad Campus.

=== Concepcion Campus ===
The campus serves the municipality of Concepcion with a total land area of 11.4523 ha and 5.619 ha fishpond. It currently offers Bachelor of Elementary Education, Bachelor of Secondary Education, Bachelor of Science in Fisheries and Bachelor of Science in Fisheries Education. At present, it has 407 students as of second semester, Academic Year 2018-2019. It also has 30 faculty members and 16 members of the administrative staff.

In June 2001, it was integrated to Northern Iloilo Polytechnic State College pursuant to Republic Act 8760 and was called NIPSC Concepcion Campus. Today, NISU Concepcion Campus is under the watch of its campus administrator, Dr. Joey S. Dela Cruz.

=== Lemery Campus ===
The campus is situated at the southeast section of the municipality of Lemery and occupies an area of 3.75 hectares. It offers Bachelor of Science in Information Technology (BSIT), Bachelor in Elementary Education (BEEd), and Bachelor of Secondary Education (BSEd).

It has 346 students as of the second semester, Academic Year 2018-2019. It is composed of 30 faculty members and 12 administrative support staff. In November 2000, it was converted to Northern Iloilo Polytechnic State College (NIPSC Lemery Campus). Today, NISU Lemery Campus is under the leadership of Dr. Wilfreda G. Arones as the campus administrator.

=== Sara Campus ===
NISU Sara Campus or the NISU Victorino Salcedo Campus (NISU VSSC) is located at Barangay Anoring in the municipality of Sara, Iloilo. It offers Bachelor of Science in Hospitality Management (BSHM), Bachelor of Science on Tourism Management (BSTM), Bachelor of Science in Criminology (BSCrim), Bachelor in Industrial Technology (BIndTech), and Bachelor of Science in Industrial Security Management (BSISM).

It has a total of 1,121 students as of the second semester, Academic Year 2018-2019. It is also composed of 45 faculty members and 28 administrative support staff. In November 2000, it was converted into Northern Iloilo Polytechnic State College (NIPSC Victorino Salcedo Sara Campus). Today, NISU VSSC is under the leadership of campus administrator Dr. Raffy B. Chavez.

Panay's largest sports complex is currently under construction within the Sara campus. It will be known as the Tingog Asenso Quinto Sports Complex due to sponsorship by the Tingog Partylist and Iloilo Congressman Boboy Tupas's Team Asenso.
