= Lemery =

Lemery may refer to:

== Places ==
Two places in the Philippines:

- Lemery, Batangas
- Lemery, Iloilo

== Other uses ==
- Lémery, a French surname
