= Balasan =

Municipality in Iloilo, Philippines

- Municipality
- Municipality of Balasan
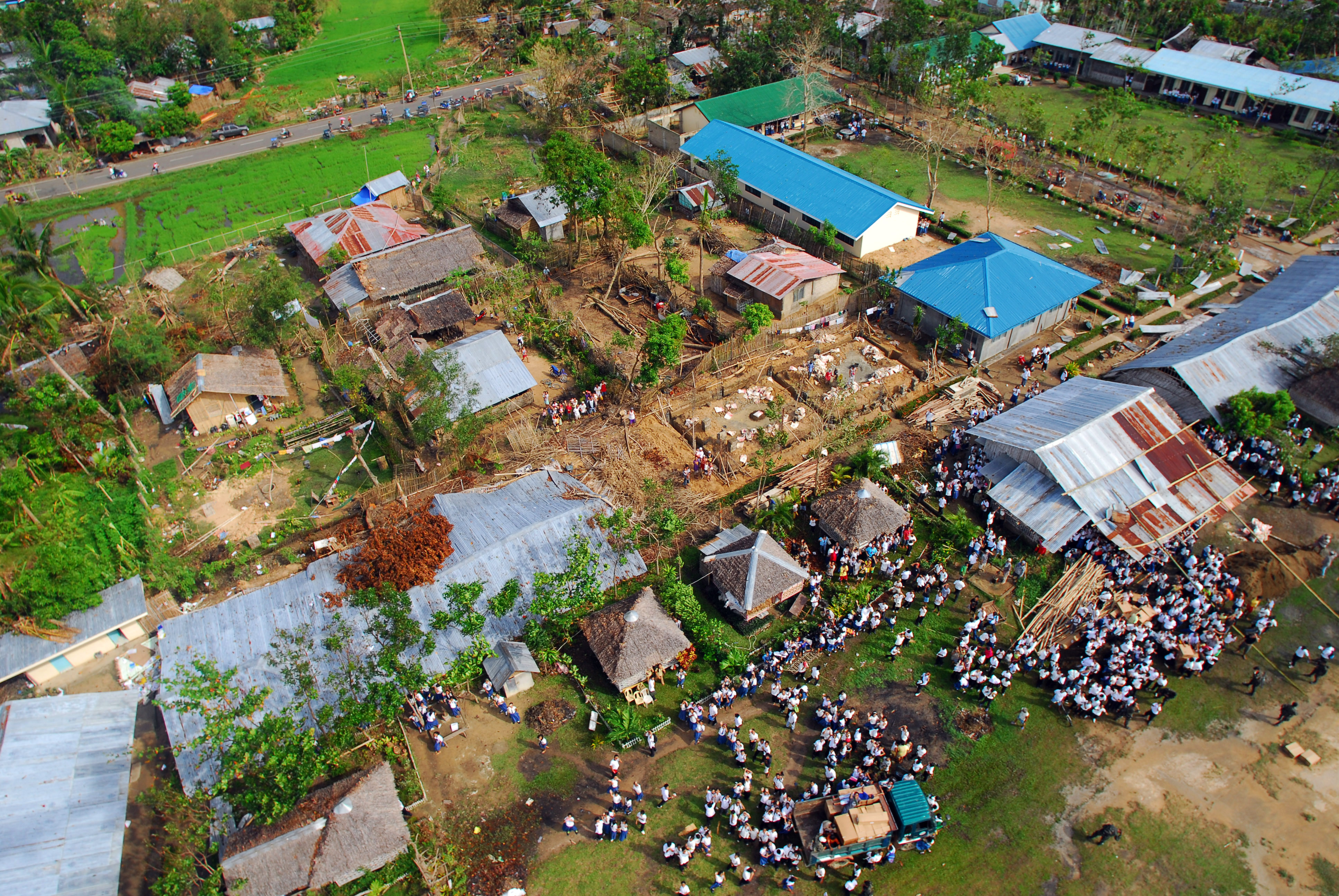
- Aerial view of Balasan

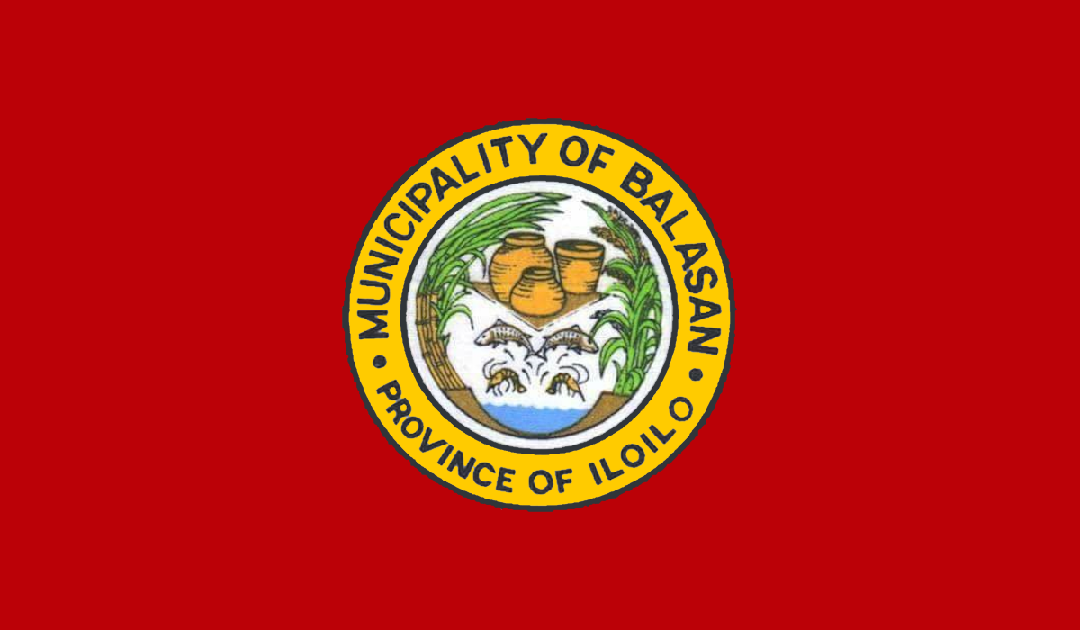
- Flag
- Etymology: Balas (sand)
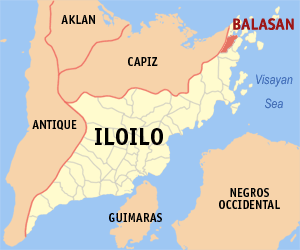
- Map of Iloilo with Balasan highlighted
- Interactive map of Balasan
- Location within the Philippines
- Coordinates: 11°28′22″N 123°05′16″E
- Country: Philippines
- Region: Western Visayas
- Province: Iloilo
- District: 5th district
- Barangays: 23 (see Barangays)

Government
  - Type: Sangguniang Bayan
  - Mayor: Filomeno V. Ganzon (Lakas)
  - Vice Mayor: Manuel C. Ganzon (Lakas)
  - Representative: Binky April M. Tupas (Lakas)
  - Municipal Council: Members: Jesse Carlos S. Ganzon (NPC); Rafael A. Obligar (Lakas); Reynaldo B. Alarcon (Lakas); Farridah Paz A. Agrasada (Lakas); Andres T. Bedro Jr. (Lakas); Antonio P. Pastrana (Ind); Eden B. Dequilla (Lakas); Marlon B. Balberona (Lakas); Margie D. Delfin ^{‡}; Christian J. Pastrana ^{◌}; ‡ ex officio ABC president; ◌ ex officio SK chairman
  - Electorate: 22,647 voters (2025)

Area
  - Total: 54.27 km^{2} (20.95 sq mi)
- Elevation: 55 m (180 ft)
- Highest elevation: 813 m (2,667 ft)
- Lowest elevation: 0 m (0 ft)

Population (2024 census)
  - Total: 35,193
  - Density: 648.5/km^{2} (1,680/sq mi)
  - Households: 9,351

Economy
  - Income class: 2nd municipal income class
  - Poverty incidence: 15.18% (2023)
  - Revenue: ₱ 183.7 million (2024)
  - Assets: ₱ 517.1 million (2024)
  - Expenditure: ₱ 168.9 million (2024)
  - Liabilities: ₱ 65.85 million (2024)

Service provider
  - Electricity: Iloilo 3 Electric Cooperative (ILECO 3)
- Time zone: UTC+8 (PST)
- ZIP code: 5018
- PSGC: 063005000
- IDD : area code: +63 (0)33
- Native languages: Hiligaynon; Capisnon; Tagalog

Balasan, officially the Municipality of Balasan (Hiligaynon: Banwa sang Balasan, Tagalog: Bayan ng Balasan), is a municipality in the province of Iloilo, Philippines. According to the 2024 census, it has a population of 35,193 people.

== Etymology ==
Balasan derived its name from "Balas" meaning sand, which remains abundant along the banks of the Bangon River, where the first settlement was established.

== History ==
Around 1846, Francisco Ariola, the son of a datu from Jolo, together with his men, arrived at the shores of Carles. He immediately organized the early settlers who later mingled with his men at Punta Bulakawe, a plateau just 330 meters north of the Poblacion (town proper). The settlers extended their clearing of the jungles and virgin lands for development. The Provincial Governor of Capiz commissioned Ariola to facilitate the transportation of families recruited from Antique and Aklan. Soon afterwards, more settlers came. The Punta Bulakawe settlement was eventually incorporated under the jurisdiction of the Pueblo de Pilar, Capiz.

It was in 1857 when Don Juan Silverio granted Francisco Ariola permission together with 50 families to go in a boat southeastwards from Barrio Sumagbong Cogon, Nabas, Capiz (Aklan) to the unfamiliar lands in the eastern portions of Panay Island. They soon landed in what was then known to be Punta Bulukawe, Capiz (Punta Badaiang, Carles). They were granted a full tax exemption for three years if they cultivated the new land.

Towards 1856, as the general clearing progressed, Francisco transferred Bulakawe to the lowland south of the settlement. The settlement was named BADIANG, which means "wild giant gabi variety" because of the abundance of this plant in the vicinity of the new site. As streets were laid out Ariola, caused the equal distribution of the home lots to settlers alongside the new created streets. Some settlers however, built their homes near farms. This later led to the formation of other barrio settlements.

After making a settlement, Francisco Ariola quickly appointed an exploration team to survey the new land further south. The team was led by Vicente Navales-the existing perpetual index of the leaders of Balasan started with the first teniente del barrio absolute, Vicente Navales in 1852. They immediately set forth southeastward to a river where they rested for the night. The morning was when the river got its name when the first man to awaken called out: ‘Bangon!’ which meant ‘Arise!’ The land after the river was a beautiful grassland full of sparrows – probably the Paser montanus (maya bongol), Lochura malacca (maya pula), or the Padda oryzivora (maya costa) which was from which the place got its name, Maya. They went further off to such places which are now known as Barangay Bulac, Batad, and Lanubo (Estancia). After being gone for quite some time, the folks in the settlement began to worry so a search party was formed to bring them back. They met with the former party in a place which was from then on known to be Tabuan (a place where people meet). The accounts of Vicente Navales made some of the folks decide to make a sister-settlement in Maya. The place did prove promising and it expanded northeastward to a place with a river which was very ideal as a channel for sea trade and source of industrial sand (baras). The place was from then until such a time was known as Barasan. It eventually expanded and soon such area which was once the extension of the maya settlement became known until now as Mamhut.

In January 1860, the leaders of the Barrio Badiang headed by Francisco Ariola went to Capiz to petition the provincial government to make Barrio Badiang a municipality. The governor denied the petition on the ground that Barrio Badiang was only newly created and was not yet capable of becoming a pueblo. Not discouraged by their first failure, the petitioners traveled for days to Iloilo City, to bring this petition to Governor Jose Maria Carles, a Spanish Governor. After studying the case, Governor Carles approved the petition and thus, Barrio Badiang became a "pueblo".

The jubilant people of Badiang, in gratitude to Governor Carles for his approval of this petition, presented another petition to change the name Badiang to Carles in honor of the Governor. This petition was approved and on July 1, 1862, Carles was inaugurated as a new Pueblo with Alenjandro Buaya as the first Gobernadorcillo del Pueblo made Carles.

On January 1, 1904, the Municipio de Carles was demoted from a status of a Barrio to the status of a Barrio Balasan. This incident disheartened some Carleseños who migrated to other towns and provinces. But among those who stayed on were the strong willed ones who struggled hard to make Carles an independent municipality. Headed by Casimiro Andrada, the Carles Separation Movement succeeded in getting the approval of the Carleseños petition for separation from Balasan on January 1, 1920.

The records show that former Badiang (Carles) then later known as Balasan became large enough that it even covered the areas which now are separate districts such as Carles, Balasan, Estancia, and Batad.

The writings of Douglas Malunda tell about a treasure that the settlers of Ariola stored in one wooden chest to make it easier to protect from thieves from both land and sea. It was said such chest of silver, gold and pearls was buried in a dried well somewhere in Balasan with only a large tree to mark its location. The most accurate knowledge of its location was known by Ariola's only son who unfortunately became one of the casualties of a cholera epidemic. With his death, the knowledge of the location of the treasure vanished. As yet, the treasure awaits its very fortunate hunter.

In 1950, the barrio of Zarragoza was transferred from the town of Batad.

== Geography ==
Balasan is in northeast Iloilo, 129 kilometres (80 mi) from the provincial capital, Iloilo City, and 58 kilometres (36 mi) from Roxas City, with a regular bus service from these 2 cities.

=== Barangays ===
Balasan is politically subdivided into 23 barangays. Each barangay consists of puroks and some have sitios.

- Aranjuez
- Bacolod
- Balanti-an
- Batuan
- Cabalic
- Camambugan
- Dolores
- Gimamanay
- Ipil
- Kinalkalan
- Lawis
- Malapoc
- Mamhut Norte
- Mamhut Sur
- Maya
- Pani-an
- Poblacion Norte
- Poblacion Sur
- Quiasan
- Salong
- Salvacion
- Tingui-an
- Zaragosa

=== Climate ===
Climate data for Balasan, Iloilo
Month	Jan	Feb	Mar	Apr	May	Jun	Jul	Aug	Sep	Oct	Nov	Dec	Year
Mean daily maximum °C (°F)	27 (81)	28 (82)	29 (84)	31 (88)	32 (90)	31 (88)	30 (86)	30 (86)	29 (84)	29 (84)	29 (84)	27 (81)	29 (85)
Mean daily minimum °C (°F)	23 (73)	23 (73)	23 (73)	24 (75)	25 (77)	25 (77)	24 (75)	24 (75)	24 (75)	24 (75)	24 (75)	23 (73)	24 (75)
Average precipitation mm (inches)	61 (2.4)	39 (1.5)	46 (1.8)	48 (1.9)	90 (3.5)	144 (5.7)	152 (6.0)	145 (5.7)	163 (6.4)	160 (6.3)	120 (4.7)	90 (3.5)	1,258 (49.4)
Average rainy days	12.3	9.0	9.9	10.0	18.5	25.0	27.4	26.0	25.9	24.9	17.9	14.2	221
Source: Meteoblue (Use with caution: this is modeled/calculated data, not measured locally.)

== Demographics ==
Population census of Balasan
Year	Pop.	±% p.a.
1903	3,223	—
1918	22,214	+13.73%
1939	12,840	−2.58%
1948	15,490	+2.11%
1960	10,967	−2.84%
1970	13,490	+2.09%
1975	15,588	+2.94%
1980	17,979	+2.89%
1990	22,013	+2.05%
1995	22,949	+0.78%
2000	25,474	+2.26%
2007	27,384	+1.00%
2010	29,724	+3.03%
2015	33,088	+2.06%
2020	35,064	+1.23%
2024	35,193	+0.09%
Source: Philippine Statistics Authority

In the 2024 census, the population of Balasan was 35,193 people, with a density of 650 inhabitants per square kilometre or 1,700 inhabitants per square mile.

== Economy ==
Poverty incidence of Balasan (%)

Source: Philippine Statistics Authority

== Transportation ==
Balasan serves as the economic and commercial hub of northern Iloilo, and features a compact urban layout accessible via walking, cycling, and public transportation.

Buses arrive at Balasan bus station, a kilometre to the Balasan's town centre, every fifteen minutes. Taking a tricycle is the most convenient way for newcomers to travel around Balasan.

== Healthcare ==
The town has two hospitals: Jesus M Colmenares District Hospital (government-owned, bed capacity 283) and Loida Sterner Hospital Facility (privately owned by a foundation, bed capacity about 100); and a Diagnostic centers: Medicus and Health Link.

== Education ==
The Balasan Schools District Office governs all educational institutions within the municipality. It oversees the management and operations of all private and public, from primary to secondary schools.

Primary and elementary schools

- Bacolod Primary School
- Balanti-an Elementary School
- Balasan Central Elementary School
- Balasan Fellowship Baptist Academy
- Batuan Primary School
- Camambugan Elementary School
- Gimamanay Elementary School
- Kinalkalan Elementary School
- Lawis Elementary School
- Mamhut Elementary School
- Mamhut Norte Primary School
- Northern Iloilo Christian School
- Pani-an Ipil Elementary School
- Pedro Bedez Elementary School
- Quiasan Elementary School
- Ritz School of Integrated Studies
- Salong Elementary School
- Salvacion Elementary School
- Tingui-an Elementary School
- Wakebridge Adventist Academy
- Zaragosa Elementary School

Secondary schools

- Balasan National High School
- Cabalic National High School

== Notable personalities ==
- Camilo Cascolan, Police chief in April 1998
- Rabiya Mateo, Beauty queen, host
