= Iloilo's 5th congressional district =

Legislative district of the Philippines

- Constituency for the House of Representatives of the Philippines
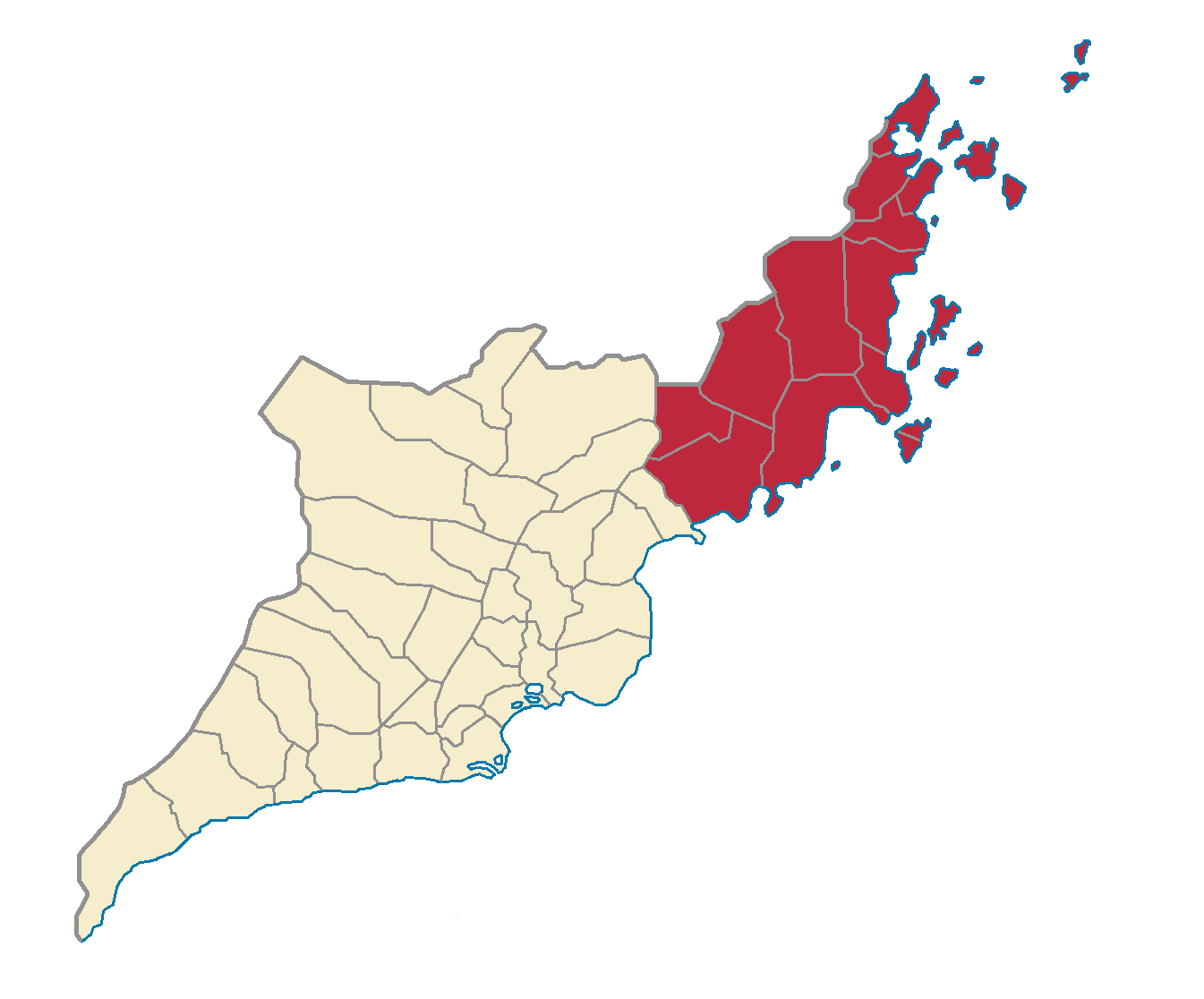
- Boundary of Iloilo's 5th congressional district in Iloilo

- Location of Iloilo within the Philippines
- Province: Iloilo
- Region: Western Visayas
- Population: 472,661 (2020)
- Electorate: 312,391 (2022)
- Major settlements: 11 LGUs: Municipalities; Ajuy; Balasan; Barotac Viejo; Batad; Carles; Concepcion; Estancia; Lemery; San Dionisio; San Rafael; Sara
- Area: 1,171.30 km^{2} (452.24 sq mi)

Current constituency
- Created: 1907
- Representative: Binky April M. Tupas
- Political party: Lakas
- Congressional bloc: Majority

Iloilo's 5th congressional district is one of the five congressional districts of the Philippines in the province of Iloilo. It has been represented in the House of Representatives of the Philippines since 1916 and earlier in the Philippine Assembly from 1907 to 1916. The district consists of the northern municipalities of Ajuy, Balasan, Barotac Viejo, Batad, Carles, Concepcion, Estancia, Lemery, San Dionisio, San Rafael and Sara. It is currently represented in the 20th Congress by Binky April M. Tupas of the Lakas–CMD.

== Representation history ==
#	Image	Member	Term of office		Legislature	Party	Electoral history	Constituent LGUs
#	Image	Member	Start	End	Legislature	Party	Electoral history	Constituent LGUs
=== Iloilo's 5th district for the Philippine Assembly ===
District created January 9, 1907.
1		Regino Dorillo	October 16, 1907	October 16, 1909	1st	Independent	Elected in 1907.	1907–1916; Balasan, Banate, Passi, Sara
2		Ramón López	October 16, 1909	October 16, 1912	2nd	Progresista	Elected in 1909.	1907–1916; Balasan, Banate, Passi, Sara
3		Cirilo P. Mapa	October 16, 1912	October 16, 1916	3rd	Progresista	Elected in 1912.	1907–1916; Balasan, Banate, Passi, Sara
=== Iloilo's 5th district for the House of Representatives of the Philippine Islands ===
4		Juan de León y Benedicto	October 16, 1916	June 3, 1919	4th	Progresista	Elected in 1916.	1916–1919; Ajuy, Balasan, Banate, Passi, Sara
5		Victorino M. Salcedo	June 3, 1919	June 6, 1922	5th	Nacionalista	Elected in 1919.	1919–1922; Ajuy, Balasan, Banate, Barotac Viejo, Carles, Estancia, Passi, Sara
6		Tomás Vargas	June 6, 1922	June 2, 1925	6th	Demócrata	Elected in 1922.	1922–1935; Ajuy, Balasan, Banate, Barotac Viejo, Calinog, Carles, Concepcion, Dueñas, Estancia, Passi, San Dionisio, Sara
7		Venancio Cudilla	June 2, 1925	September 16, 1935	7th	Nacionalista; Consolidado	Elected in 1925.	1922–1935; Ajuy, Balasan, Banate, Barotac Viejo, Calinog, Carles, Concepcion, Dueñas, Estancia, Passi, San Dionisio, Sara
7		Venancio Cudilla	June 2, 1925	September 16, 1935	8th	Nacionalista; Consolidado	Re-elected in 1928.	1922–1935; Ajuy, Balasan, Banate, Barotac Viejo, Calinog, Carles, Concepcion, Dueñas, Estancia, Passi, San Dionisio, Sara
7		Venancio Cudilla	June 2, 1925	September 16, 1935	9th	Nacionalista; Consolidado	Re-elected in 1931.	1922–1935; Ajuy, Balasan, Banate, Barotac Viejo, Calinog, Carles, Concepcion, Dueñas, Estancia, Passi, San Dionisio, Sara
7		Venancio Cudilla	June 2, 1925	September 16, 1935	10th	Nacionalista; Demócrata Pro-Independencia	Re-elected in 1934.	1922–1935; Ajuy, Balasan, Banate, Barotac Viejo, Calinog, Carles, Concepcion, Dueñas, Estancia, Passi, San Dionisio, Sara
#	Image	Member	Term of office		National Assembly	Party	Electoral history	Constituent LGUs
#	Image	Member	Start	End	National Assembly	Party	Electoral history	Constituent LGUs
=== Iloilo's 5th district for the National Assembly (Commonwealth of the Philippines) ===
(5)		Victorino M. Salcedo	September 16, 1935	December 30, 1941	1st	Nacionalista; Democrático	Elected in 1935.	1935–1941; Ajuy, Balasan, Banate, Barotac Viejo, Carles, Concepcion, Dueñas, Estancia, Passi, San Dionisio, Sara
(5)		Victorino M. Salcedo	September 16, 1935	December 30, 1941	2nd	Nacionalista	Re-elected in 1938.	1935–1941; Ajuy, Balasan, Banate, Barotac Viejo, Carles, Concepcion, Dueñas, Estancia, Passi, San Dionisio, Sara
District dissolved into the two-seat Iloilo's at-large district and the two-seat Iloilo City's at-large district for the National Assembly (Second Philippine Republic).
#	Image	Member	Term of office		Common wealth Congress	Party	Electoral history	Constituent LGUs
#	Image	Member	Start	End	Common wealth Congress	Party	Electoral history	Constituent LGUs
=== Iloilo's 5th district for the House of Representatives of the Commonwealth of the Philippines ===
District re-created May 24, 1945.
8		Juan V. Borra	June 9, 1945	May 25, 1946	1st	Nacionalista	Elected in 1941.	1945–1946; Ajuy, Anilao, Balasan, Banate, Barotac Viejo, Carles, Concepcion, Dueñas, Estancia, Passi, San Dionisio, Sara
#	Image	Member	Term of office		Congress	Party	Electoral history	Constituent LGUs
#	Image	Member	Start	End	Congress	Party	Electoral history	Constituent LGUs
=== Iloilo's 5th district for the House of Representatives of the Philippines ===
(8)		Juan V. Borra	May 25, 1946	December 30, 1949	1st	Liberal	Re-elected in 1946.	1946–1949; Ajuy, Anilao, Balasan, Banate, Barotac Viejo, Carles, Concepcion, Dueñas, Estancia, Passi, San Dionisio, Sara
9		Jose Aldeguer	December 30, 1949	September 23, 1972	2nd	Nacionalista	Elected in 1949.	1949–1957; Ajuy, Anilao, Balasan, Banate, Barotac Viejo, Batad, Carles, Concepcion, Dueñas, Estancia, Lemery, Passi, San Dionisio, Sara
9		Jose Aldeguer	December 30, 1949	September 23, 1972	3rd	Democratic	Re-elected in 1953.	1949–1957; Ajuy, Anilao, Balasan, Banate, Barotac Viejo, Batad, Carles, Concepcion, Dueñas, Estancia, Lemery, Passi, San Dionisio, Sara
9		Jose Aldeguer	December 30, 1949	September 23, 1972	4th	Nacionalista	Re-elected in 1957.	1957–1969; Ajuy, Anilao, Balasan, Banate, Barotac Viejo, Batad, Carles, Concepcion, Dueñas, Estancia, Lemery, Passi, San Dionisio, San Enrique, Sara
9		Jose Aldeguer	December 30, 1949	September 23, 1972	5th	Nacionalista	Re-elected in 1961.	1957–1969; Ajuy, Anilao, Balasan, Banate, Barotac Viejo, Batad, Carles, Concepcion, Dueñas, Estancia, Lemery, Passi, San Dionisio, San Enrique, Sara
9		Jose Aldeguer	December 30, 1949	September 23, 1972	6th	Nacionalista	Re-elected in 1965.	1957–1969; Ajuy, Anilao, Balasan, Banate, Barotac Viejo, Batad, Carles, Concepcion, Dueñas, Estancia, Lemery, Passi, San Dionisio, San Enrique, Sara
9		Jose Aldeguer	December 30, 1949	September 23, 1972	7th	Nacionalista	Re-elected in 1969. Removed from office after imposition of martial law.	1969–1972; Ajuy, Anilao, Balasan, Banate, Barotac Viejo, Batad, Carles, Concepcion, Dueñas, Estancia, Lemery, Passi, San Dionisio, San Enrique, San Rafael, Sara
District dissolved into the sixteen-seat Region VI's at-large district for the Interim Batasang Pambansa, followed by the five-seat Iloilo's at-large district for the Regular Batasang Pambansa.
District re-created February 2, 1987.
10		Niel D. Tupas Sr.	June 30, 1987	June 30, 1998	8th	PDP–Laban	Elected in 1987.	1987–present Ajuy, Balasan, Barotac Viejo, Batad, Carles, Concepcion, Estancia, Lemery, San Dionisio, San Rafael, Sara
10		Niel D. Tupas Sr.	June 30, 1987	June 30, 1998	9th	Liberal	Re-elected in 1992.	1987–present Ajuy, Balasan, Barotac Viejo, Batad, Carles, Concepcion, Estancia, Lemery, San Dionisio, San Rafael, Sara
10		Niel D. Tupas Sr.	June 30, 1987	June 30, 1998	10th	Liberal	Re-elected in 1995.	1987–present Ajuy, Balasan, Barotac Viejo, Batad, Carles, Concepcion, Estancia, Lemery, San Dionisio, San Rafael, Sara
11		Rolex T. Suplico	June 30, 1998	June 30, 2007	11th	LDP	Elected in 1998.	1987–present Ajuy, Balasan, Barotac Viejo, Batad, Carles, Concepcion, Estancia, Lemery, San Dionisio, San Rafael, Sara
11		Rolex T. Suplico	June 30, 1998	June 30, 2007	12th	LDP	Re-elected in 2001.	1987–present Ajuy, Balasan, Barotac Viejo, Batad, Carles, Concepcion, Estancia, Lemery, San Dionisio, San Rafael, Sara
11		Rolex T. Suplico	June 30, 1998	June 30, 2007	13th	LDP	Re-elected in 2004.	1987–present Ajuy, Balasan, Barotac Viejo, Batad, Carles, Concepcion, Estancia, Lemery, San Dionisio, San Rafael, Sara
12		Niel Tupas Jr.	June 30, 2007	June 30, 2016	14th	Liberal	Elected in 2007.	1987–present Ajuy, Balasan, Barotac Viejo, Batad, Carles, Concepcion, Estancia, Lemery, San Dionisio, San Rafael, Sara
12		Niel Tupas Jr.	June 30, 2007	June 30, 2016	15th	Liberal	Re-elected in 2010.	1987–present Ajuy, Balasan, Barotac Viejo, Batad, Carles, Concepcion, Estancia, Lemery, San Dionisio, San Rafael, Sara
12		Niel Tupas Jr.	June 30, 2007	June 30, 2016	16th	Liberal	Re-elected in 2013.	1987–present Ajuy, Balasan, Barotac Viejo, Batad, Carles, Concepcion, Estancia, Lemery, San Dionisio, San Rafael, Sara
13		Raul C. Tupas	June 30, 2016	June 30, 2025	17th	Nacionalista	Elected in 2016.	1987–present Ajuy, Balasan, Barotac Viejo, Batad, Carles, Concepcion, Estancia, Lemery, San Dionisio, San Rafael, Sara
13		Raul C. Tupas	June 30, 2016	June 30, 2025	18th	Nacionalista	Re-elected in 2019.	1987–present Ajuy, Balasan, Barotac Viejo, Batad, Carles, Concepcion, Estancia, Lemery, San Dionisio, San Rafael, Sara
13		Raul C. Tupas	June 30, 2016	June 30, 2025	19th	Lakas	Re-elected in 2022.	1987–present Ajuy, Balasan, Barotac Viejo, Batad, Carles, Concepcion, Estancia, Lemery, San Dionisio, San Rafael, Sara
14		Binky April M. Tupas	June 30, 2025	Incumbent	20th	Lakas	Elected in 2025.	1987–present Ajuy, Balasan, Barotac Viejo, Batad, Carles, Concepcion, Estancia, Lemery, San Dionisio, San Rafael, Sara

== Election results ==
=== 2025 ===
Candidate	Party	Votes	%
Binky Tupas	Lakas–CMD	145,283	56.18
Niel Tupas Jr.	Nationalist People's Coalition	113,313	43.82
Total		258,596	100.00
Valid votes		258,596	94.03
Invalid/blank votes		16,430	5.97
Total votes		275,026	100.00
Registered voters/turnout		318,739	86.29
Lakas–CMD hold			
Source: Commission on Elections

=== 2022 ===
2022 Philippine House of Representatives elections
Party	Candidate	Votes	%
Nacionalista	Raul Tupas	173,031	64.75
Liberal	Niel Tupas Jr.	75,304	28.18
Invalid or blank votes		18,884	7.06
Total votes		267,219	100.00
Nacionalista hold			

=== 2019 ===
2019 Philippine House of Representatives elections
Party	Candidate	Votes	%
Nacionalista	Raul Tupas	139,100	59.28
Liberal	Niel Tupas Jr.	73,783	31.44
Independent	Gervacio Del Castillo	714	0.30
Invalid or blank votes		21,020	8.95
Total votes		234,617	100.00
Nacionalista hold			

(Note: Raul Tupas switched from NPC to Nacionalista between 2016 and 2018)

=== 2016 ===
2016 Philippine House of Representatives elections
Party	Candidate	Votes	%
NPC	Raul Tupas	117,610	54.07
Liberal	Yvonne Angeli Tupas	79,833	36.70
Invalid or blank votes		20,054	9.22
Total votes		217,497	100.00
NPC gain from Liberal			

=== 2013 ===
2013 Philippine House of Representatives elections
Party	Candidate	Votes	%
Liberal	Niel Tupas Jr.	101,851	62.62
UNA	Jett Rojas	44,324	27.25
Margin of victory		57,527	35.37
Invalid or blank votes		16,471	10.13
Total votes		162,646	100.00
Liberal hold			

=== 2010 ===
2010 Philippine House of Representatives elections
Party	Candidate	Votes	%
Liberal	Niel Tupas Jr.	87,455	52.41
Nacionalista	Rolex Suplico	78,869	47.27
NPC	Raul Alba	541	0.32
Valid ballots		166,856	92.87
Invalid or blank votes		8,388	4.79
Total votes		175,253	100.00
Liberal hold			

== See also ==
- Legislative districts of Iloilo
