= Lémery =

Lémery is a French surname. Notable people with the surname include:

- Henry Lémery (1874–1972), Martinique politician
- José Lemery e Ibarrola Ney (1811-1886), Spanish general
- Louis Lémery (1677–1743), French botanist and chemist
- Nicolas Lemery (1645–1715), French chemist
