= San Rafael, Iloilo =

Municipality in Iloilo, Philippines

San Rafael
- Municipality
- Municipality of San Rafael
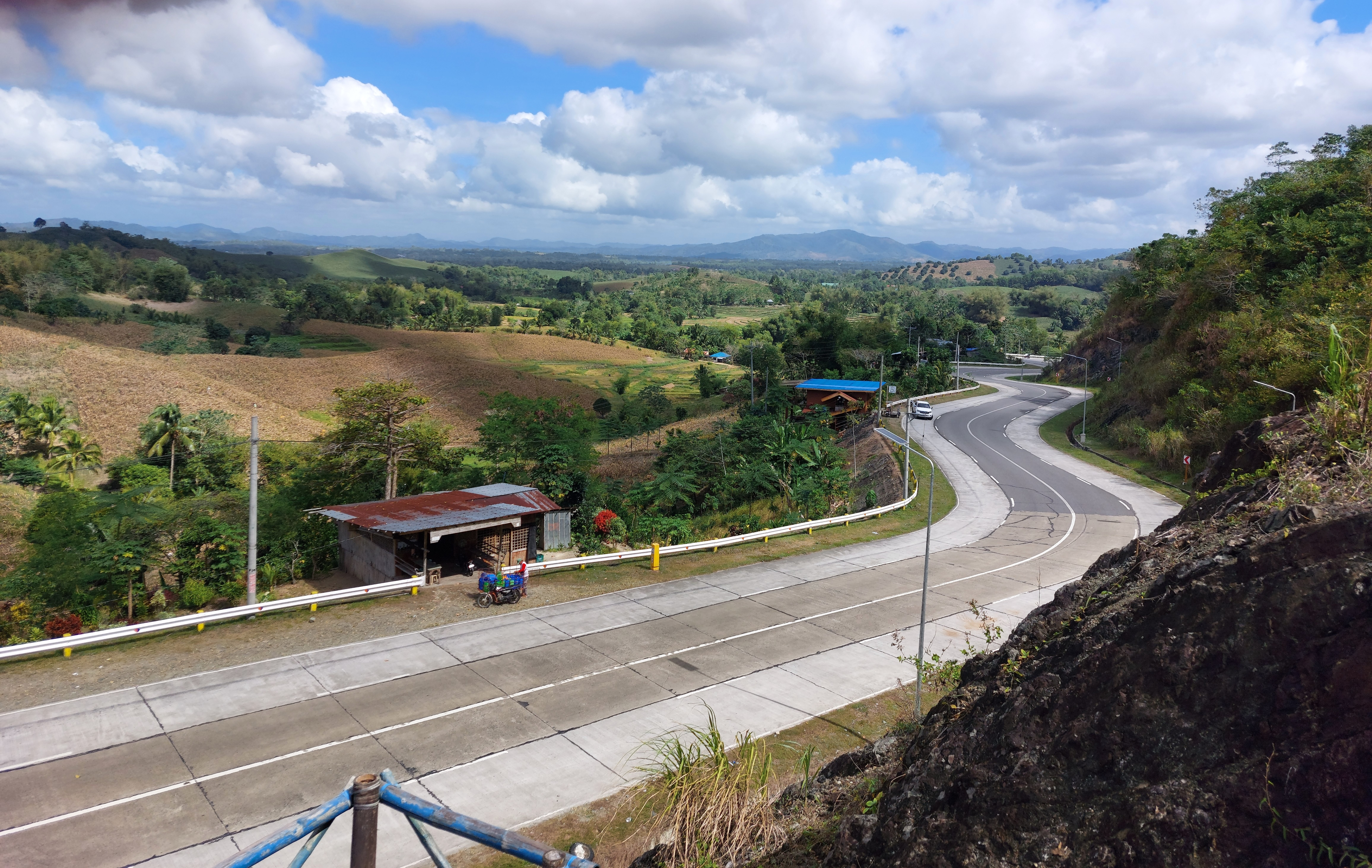
- Mountain road in San Rafael

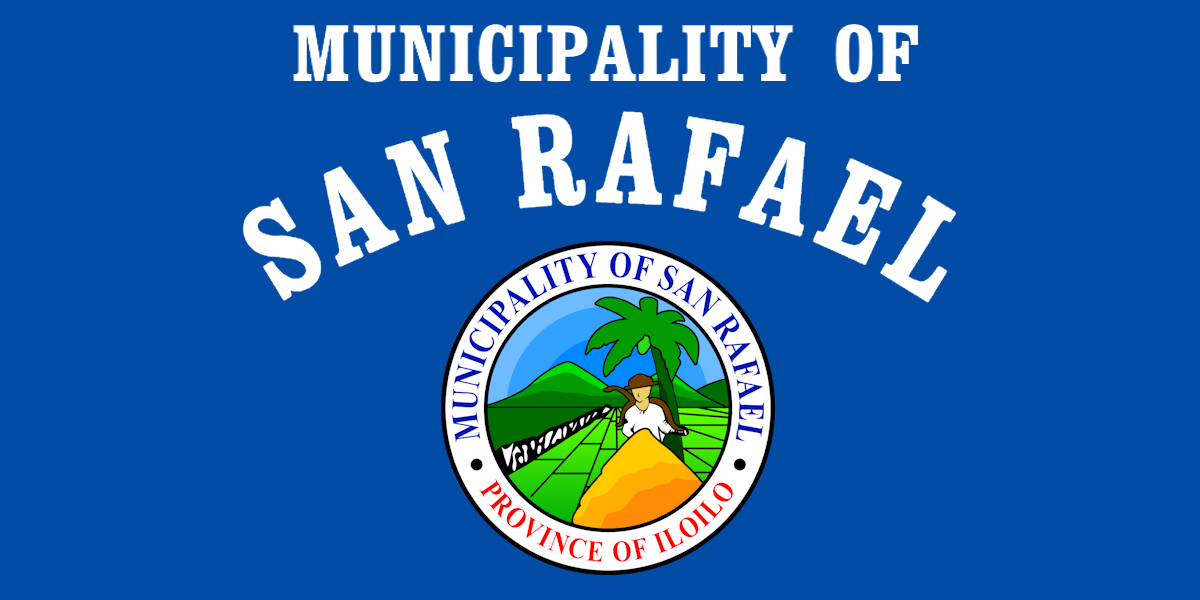
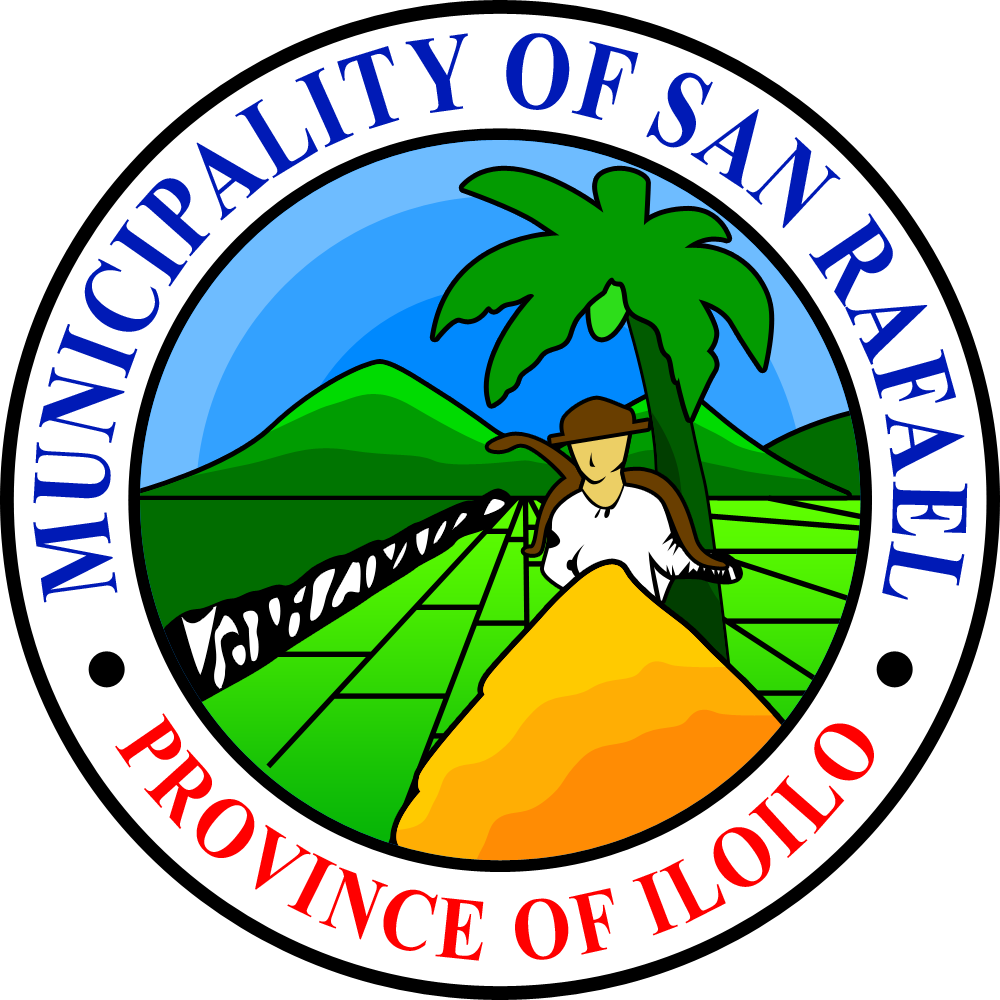
- Flag Seal

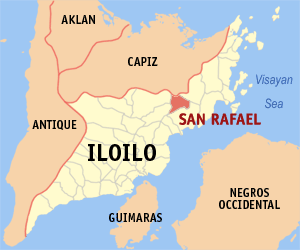
- Map of Iloilo with San Rafael highlighted
- Interactive map of San Rafael
- Location within the Philippines
- Coordinates: 11°10′22″N 122°49′36″E
- Country: Philippines
- Region: Western Visayas
- Province: Iloilo
- District: 5th district
- Founded: 1969
- Barangays: 9 (see Barangays)

Government
  - Type: Sangguniang Bayan
  - Mayor: Roel T. Belleza, Jr. (Lakas)
  - Vice Mayor: Roberto T. Belleza, Jr. (Lakas)
  - Representative: Binky April M. Tupas (Lakas)
  - Municipal Council: Members: Joevel M. Baclagon (Lakas); Myrfre C. Palabrica (Lakas); Domingo C. Pamonag, Jr. (Lakas); Jeanet B. Escolida (Lakas); Nerio B. Pantilanan (Lakas); Mariano M. Aleman, Jr. (Ind); Lalaine B. Baldeviso (Lakas); Racel Renz P. Bamo (Lakas); Joepert B. Arandilla ^{‡}; Christine B. Puerin ^{◌}; ‡ ex officio ABC president; ◌ ex officio SK chairman
  - Electorate: 12,515 voters (2025)

Area
  - Total: 67.05 km^{2} (25.89 sq mi)
- Elevation: 129 m (423 ft)
- Highest elevation: 523 m (1,716 ft)
- Lowest elevation: 58 m (190 ft)

Population (2024 census)
  - Total: 18,293
  - Density: 272.8/km^{2} (706.6/sq mi)
  - Households: 4,340

Economy
  - Income class: 4th municipal income class
  - Poverty incidence: 19.54% (2023)
  - Revenue: ₱ 142.7 million (2022)
  - Assets: ₱ 490.2 million (2022)
  - Expenditure: ₱ 63.92 million (2022)
  - Liabilities: ₱ 122.5 million (2022)

Service provider
  - Electricity: Iloilo 3 Electric Cooperative (ILECO 3)
- Time zone: UTC+8 (PST)
- ZIP code: 5039
- PSGC: 063042000
- IDD : area code: +63 (0)33
- Native languages: Hiligaynon; Capisnon; Karay-a; Ati; Tagalog
- Website: www.sanrafael-iloilo.gov.ph

San Rafael, officially the Municipality of San Rafael (Hiligaynon: Banwa sang San Rafael, Tagalog: Bayan ng San Rafael), is a municipality in the province of Iloilo, Philippines. According to the 2024 census, it has a population of 18,293 people.

== History ==
In 1969, all or part of 16 barrios (barangays) of Barotac Viejo were separated from that town and consolidated into the new municipality. However, in 1971 Republic Act No. 6267 decreed that 5 barrios be restored to Barotac Viejo, with the barrio of Omio becoming part of Lemery.

=== Fire ===
In February 2012, a fire damaged 18 stalls in the public market. As San Rafael has no fire station, fire trucks had to be called in from nearby towns.

=== Typhoon Haiyan ===
Typhoon Haiyan passed over Panay Island on November 8, 2013, affecting San Rafael along with several other coastal cities. The provincial board declared the state of Iloilo to be in a state of emergency, after acting governor Raul C. Tupas toured the fifth district. Local convenience stores were heavily damaged during the storm, although at least one reopened soon after. Several houses were damaged during the typhoon. They were destroyed by strong wind and falling trees. After a few days, relief soon arrived. Several new houses were built by a religious organization.

== Geography ==
San Rafael is located 74 kilometres (46 mi) from the provincial capital, Iloilo City. It is bordered by Dumarao to the north, Lemery to the east, Barotac Viejo to the south, and Passi City to the west.

San Dionisio, one of the nine barangays, has the most land area (1,772.5532 hectares), while Aripdip has the least (486.4018 hectares). Poblacion, San Florentino, and San Andres are the next three largest barangays, with 1,476.3524 hectares, 993.5601 hectares, and 974.0931 hectares, respectively.

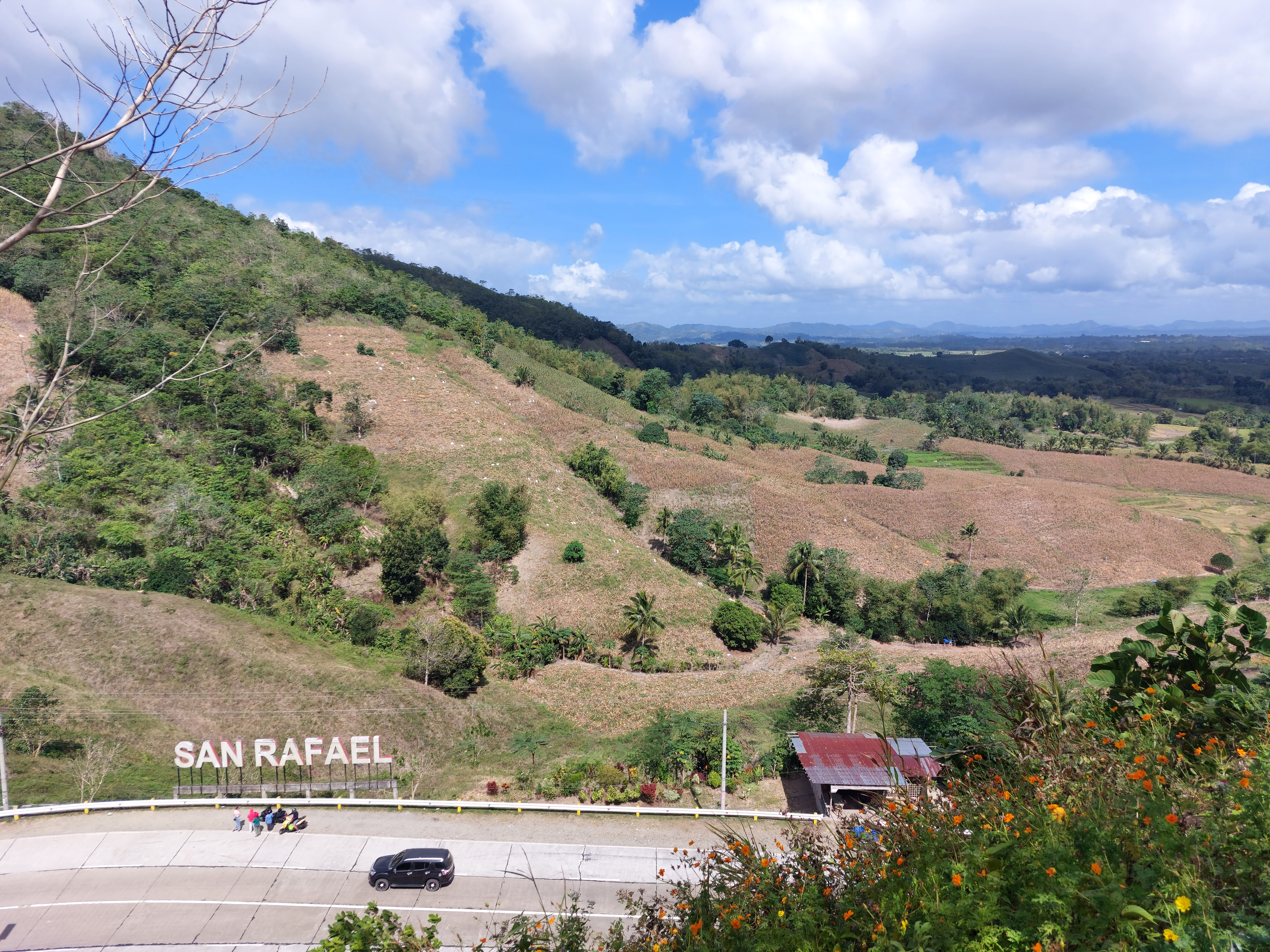
Mountain road with San Rafael Landmark Sign

=== Climate ===
Climate data for San Rafael, Iloilo
Month	Jan	Feb	Mar	Apr	May	Jun	Jul	Aug	Sep	Oct	Nov	Dec	Year
Mean daily maximum °C (°F)	26 (79)	27 (81)	29 (84)	31 (88)	31 (88)	30 (86)	29 (84)	29 (84)	29 (84)	28 (82)	28 (82)	27 (81)	29 (84)
Mean daily minimum °C (°F)	22 (72)	22 (72)	22 (72)	23 (73)	24 (75)	24 (75)	24 (75)	24 (75)	24 (75)	23 (73)	23 (73)	23 (73)	23 (74)
Average precipitation mm (inches)	61 (2.4)	39 (1.5)	46 (1.8)	48 (1.9)	90 (3.5)	144 (5.7)	152 (6.0)	145 (5.7)	163 (6.4)	160 (6.3)	120 (4.7)	90 (3.5)	1,258 (49.4)
Average rainy days	12.3	9.0	9.9	10.0	18.5	25.0	27.4	26.0	25.9	24.9	17.9	14.2	221
Source: Meteoblue

Nine (9) barangays, namely Aripdip, Bagacay, Calaigang, Ilongbukid, Poblacion, Poscolon, San Andres, San Dionisio, and San Florentino, make up the municipality of San Rafael. San Dionisio, one of the nine barangays, has the most land area (1,772.5532 hectares), while Aripdip has the least (486.4018 hectares). Poblacion, San Florentino, and San Andres are the next three largest barangays, with 1,476.3524 hectares, 993.5601 hectares, and 974.0931 hectares, respectively.

=== Barangays ===
San Rafael is politically subdivided into 9 barangays. Each barangay consists of puroks and some have sitios.

- Aripdip
- Bagacay
- Calaigang
- Ilongbukid
- Poscolon
- San Andres
- San Dionisio
- San Florentino
- Poblacion

== Demographics ==
Population census of San Rafael
Year	Pop.	±% p.a.
1970	8,322	—
1975	6,953	−3.54%
1980	8,742	+4.68%
1990	11,199	+2.51%
1995	12,000	+1.30%
2000	12,847	+1.47%
2007	13,694	+0.88%
2010	14,655	+2.50%
2015	16,532	+2.32%
2020	17,795	+1.56%
2024	18,293	+0.66%
Source: Philippine Statistics Authority

In the 2024 census, the population of San Rafael was 18,293 people, with a density of 270 inhabitants per square kilometre or 700 inhabitants per square mile.

== Economy ==
Poverty incidence of San Rafael (%)

Source: Philippine Statistics Authority

== Government ==
In 2013, Beboy Belleza was re-elected as mayor by an almost 2-1 margin.

== Education ==
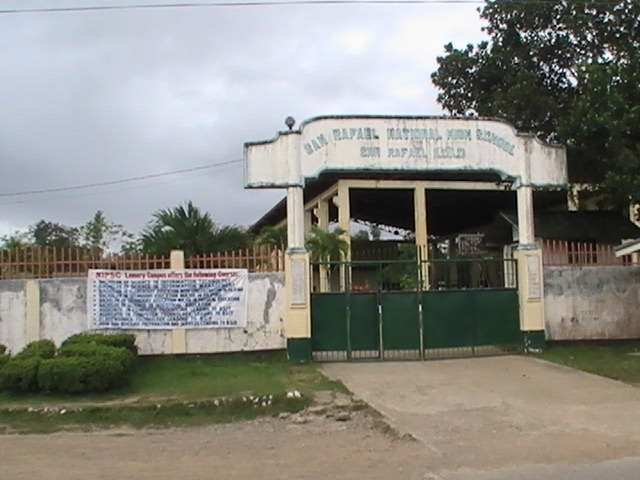
The exterior gate of San Rafael National High School, 2009.

San Rafael has elementary schools in almost all barangays. There is a primary school in Bagacay. San Rafael Central School is located in Poblacion. Children spend 2 years in kindergarten and 6 years in elementary.

San Rafael has two high schools: San Rafael National High School was established in 1983, while Ilongbukid National High School was created in 2000. Students spend 4 years in high school. There are 4 grading periods each school year. The 4th grading period is the most important because it determines if the student will advance a grade the next school year.

Secondary school starts with 1st Year and ends with 4th Year. The subjects for Grade 1 students are English, Mathematics, Pilipino, and Sibika at Cultura (History and Culture). English language is used as the language of instruction for English, Mathematics, and Science. Grade 2 students take English, Mathematics, Science, Sibika at Kutura, Agriculture. Grade 3-6 students take additional courses, such as Music, Art, P.E., and Hekasi (it contains 5 subjects but is graded as one subject).
