= Ajuy, Iloilo =

Municipality in Iloilo, Philippines

Ajuy
- Municipality
- Municipality of Ajuy
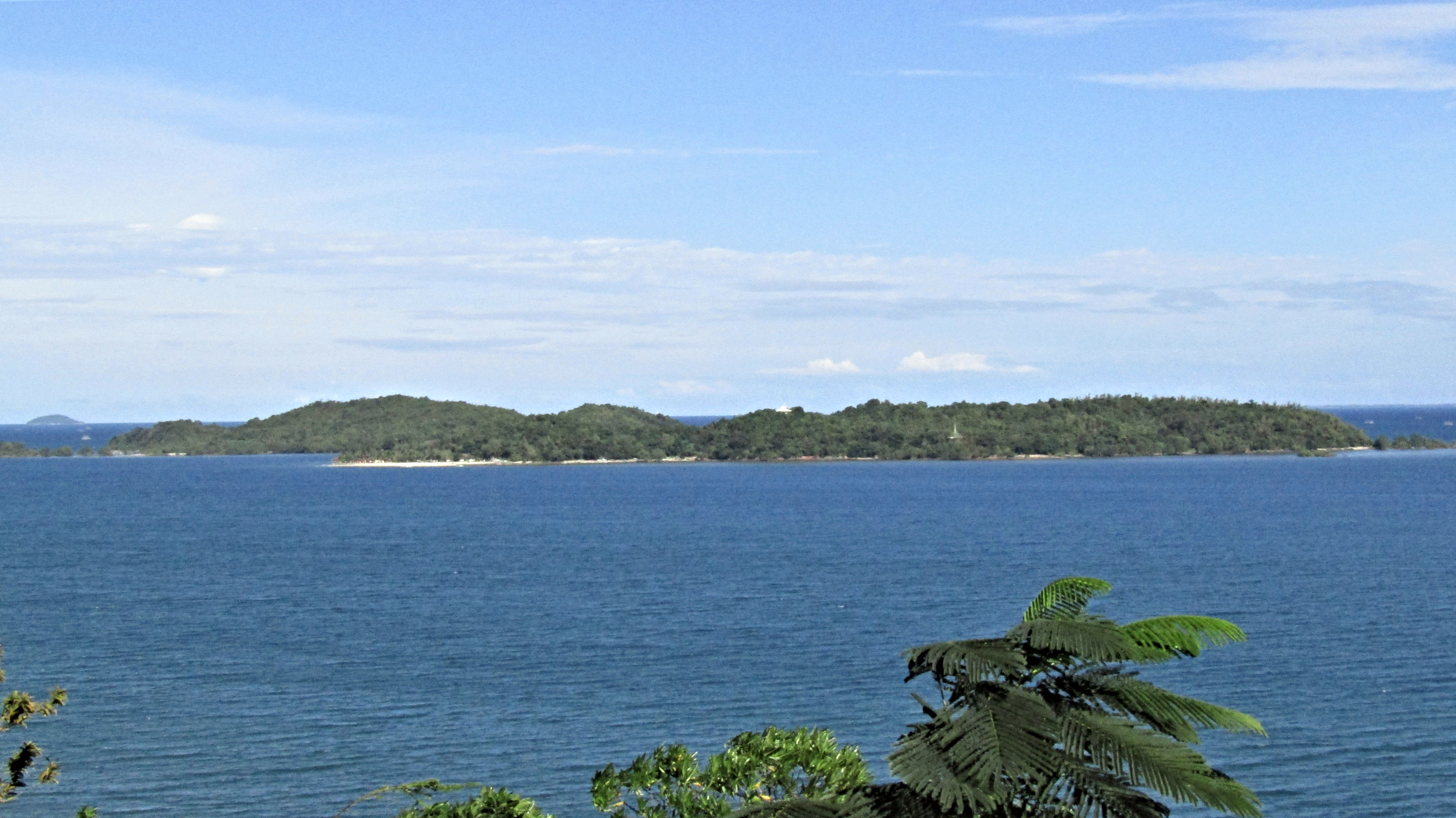
- Nasidman Island, Ajuy

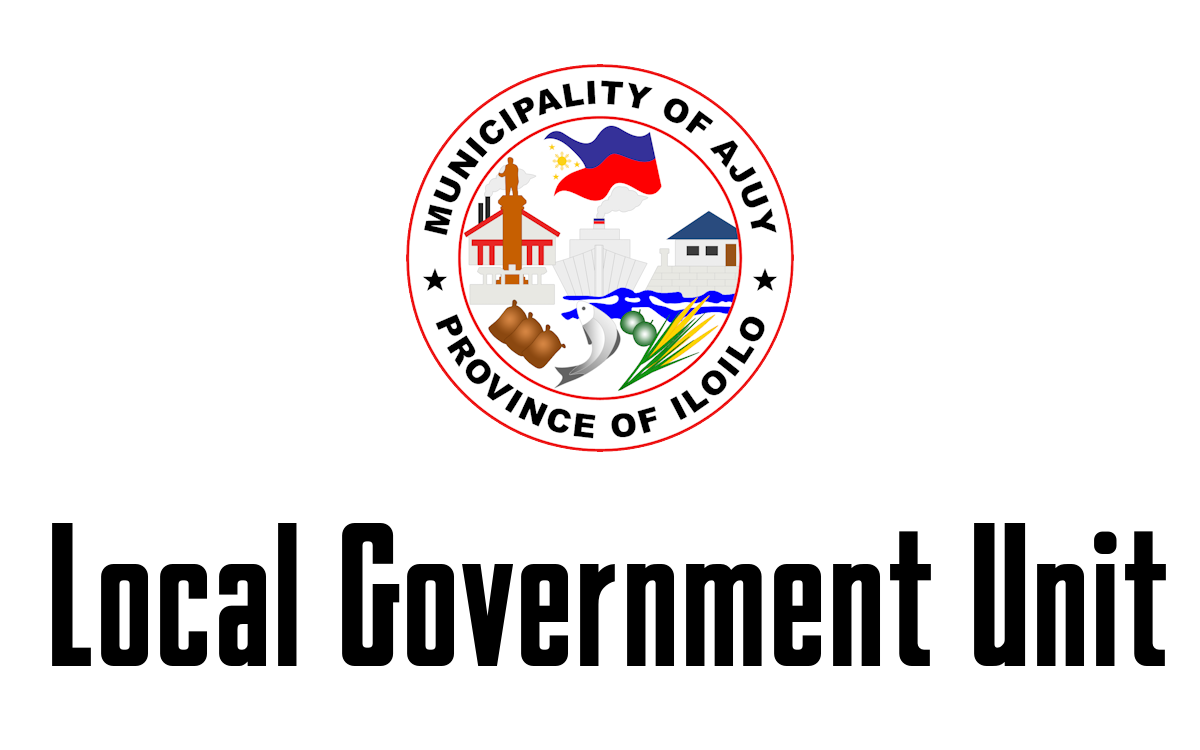
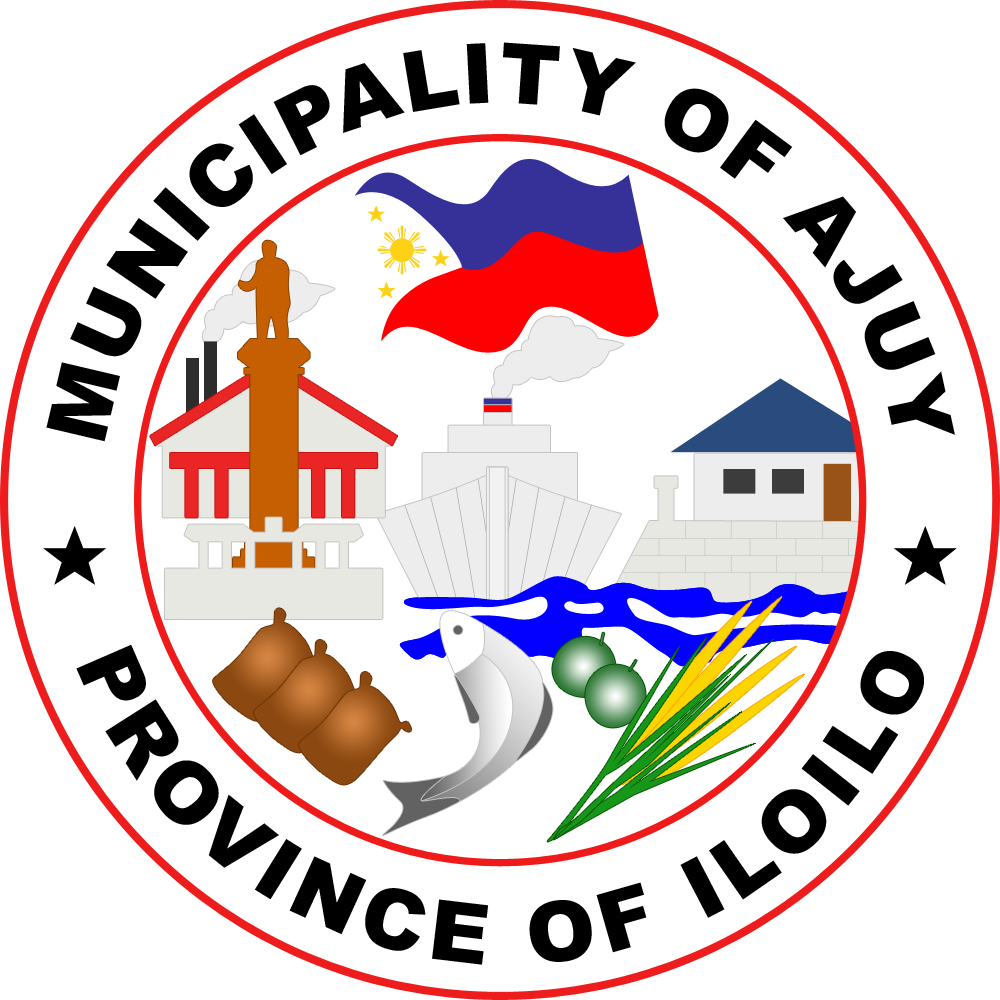
- Flag Seal
- Interactive map of Ajuy
- Location within the Philippines
- Coordinates: 11°10′21″N 123°01′11″E
- Country: Philippines
- Region: Western Visayas
- Province: Iloilo
- District: 5th district
- Barangays: 34 (see Barangays)

Government
  - Type: Sangguniang Bayan
  - Mayor: Loida J. Espinosa - Anotado(Lakas)
  - Vice Mayor: Jett C. Rojas (Lakas)
  - Representative: Binky April M. Tupas (Lakas)
  - Municipal Council: Members: Mark Anthony V. Tupas (PFP); Tommy G. Celis (Lakas); Robert R. Villaruz (PMP); Ramon T. Rojas, III (PFP); Genesis C. Diesto (PMP); Joyce R. Zerrudo (PFP); Benjamin C. Rojas, III (Lakas); Ramon T. Espinosa, Jr. (PFP); DE Gard Tupas ^{‡}; JM C. Gulmatico ^{◌}; ‡ ex officio ABC president; ◌ ex officio SK chairman
  - Electorate: 36,230 voters (2025)

Area
  - Total: 175.57 km^{2} (67.79 sq mi)
- Elevation: 32 m (105 ft)
- Highest elevation: 451 m (1,480 ft)
- Lowest elevation: 0 m (0 ft)

Population (2024 census)
  - Total: 54,100
  - Density: 308/km^{2} (798/sq mi)
  - Households: 14,013

Economy
  - Income class: 1st municipal income class
  - Poverty incidence: 19.63% (2023)
  - Revenue: ₱ 231.9 million (2024)
  - Assets: ₱ 679.8 million (2024)
  - Expenditure: ₱ 93.73 million (2024)
  - Liabilities: ₱ 171.3 million (2024)

Service provider
  - Electricity: Iloilo 3 Electric Cooperative (ILECO 3)
- Time zone: UTC+8 (PST)
- ZIP code: 5012
- PSGC: 063001000
- IDD : area code: +63 (0)33
- Native languages: Hiligaynon; Capisnon; Tagalog

Ajuy, officially the Municipality of Ajuy (Hiligaynon: Banwa sang Ajuy, Tagalog: Bayan ng Ajuy), is a municipality in the province of Iloilo, Philippines. According to the 2024 census, it has a population of 54,100 people.

== Geography ==
Ajuy is 88 kilometres (55 mi) from Iloilo City and 99 kilometres (62 mi) from Roxas City.

=== Barangays ===
Ajuy is politically subdivided into 34 barangays. Each barangay consists of puroks and some have sitios.

- Adcadarao
- Agbobolo
- Badiangan
- Barrido
- Bato Biasong
- Bay-ang
- Bucana Bunglas
- Central
- Culasi
- Lanjagan
- Luca
- Malayu-an
- Mangorocoro
- Nasidman
- Pantalan Nabaye
- Pantalan Navarro
- Pedada
- Pili
- Pinantan Diel
- Pinantan Elizalde
- Pinay Espinosa
- Poblacion
- Progreso
- Puente Bunglas
- Punta Buri
- Rojas
- San Antonio
- Silagon
- Santo Rosario
- Tagubanhan
- Taguhangin
- Tanduyan
- Tipacla
- Tubogan

=== Climate ===
Climate data for Ajuy, Iloilo
Month	Jan	Feb	Mar	Apr	May	Jun	Jul	Aug	Sep	Oct	Nov	Dec	Year
Mean daily maximum °C (°F)	27 (81)	28 (82)	29 (84)	31 (88)	32 (90)	31 (88)	30 (86)	30 (86)	29 (84)	29 (84)	29 (84)	27 (81)	29 (85)
Mean daily minimum °C (°F)	23 (73)	23 (73)	23 (73)	24 (75)	25 (77)	25 (77)	24 (75)	24 (75)	24 (75)	24 (75)	24 (75)	23 (73)	24 (75)
Average precipitation mm (inches)	61 (2.4)	39 (1.5)	46 (1.8)	48 (1.9)	90 (3.5)	144 (5.7)	152 (6.0)	145 (5.7)	163 (6.4)	160 (6.3)	120 (4.7)	90 (3.5)	1,258 (49.4)
Average rainy days	12.3	9.0	9.9	10.0	18.5	25.0	27.4	26.0	25.9	24.9	17.9	14.2	221
Source: Meteoblue (Use with caution: this is modeled/calculated data, not measured locally.)

== Demographics ==
Population census of Ajuy
Year	Pop.	±% p.a.
1903	7,854	—
1918	11,981	+2.86%
1939	15,469	+1.22%
1948	17,448	+1.35%
1960	18,655	+0.56%
1970	21,770	+1.55%
1975	26,113	+3.72%
1980	30,397	+3.08%
1990	38,120	+2.29%
1995	38,415	+0.14%
2000	45,192	+3.54%
2007	47,113	+0.58%
2010	47,248	+0.10%
2015	52,268	+1.94%
2020	53,462	+0.48%
2024	54,100	+0.29%
Source: Philippine Statistics Authority

In the 2024 census, the population of Ajuy was 54,100 people, with a density of 310 inhabitants per square kilometre or 800 inhabitants per square mile.

== Economy ==
Poverty incidence of Ajuy

Source: Philippine Statistics Authority

== Education ==
The Ajuy Schools District Office governs all educational institutions within the municipality. It oversees the management and operations of all private and public, from primary to secondary schools.

Primary and elementary schools

- Agbobolo Primary School
- Ajuy Christian Development Academy
- Ajuy Iglesia Filipina Independiente Academy
- Alejo Posadas Memorial Elementary School
- Badiangan Elementary School
- Barrido Elementary School
- Beatriz D. Tupas Memorial Elementary School
- Bucana Bunglas Primary School
- Clarita Damires Carnate Nazarene Christian School
- Culasi Elementary School
- Lanjagan Elementary School
- Luca Elementary School
- Malayu-an Elementary School
- Mangorocoro Elementary School
- Nasidman Primary School
- Pantalan Navarro Elementary School
- Patricio Alcantara Memorial Elementary School
- Pedada Elementary School
- Pili Elementary School
- Pinay Espinosa Elementary School
- Progreso Elementary School
- Punta Buri Elementary School
- San Antonio Primary School
- Silagon Elementary School
- Sto. Rosario Elementary School
- Tagubanhan Primary School
- Tubogan Primary School
- Valentin Dignadice Memorial Elementary School

Secondary schools

- Adcadarao Integrated School
- Ajuy National High School
- Bay-ang National High School
- Bucana Bunglas National High School
- Culasi National High School
- Luca National High School
- Pili National High School
- Puente Bunglas Integrated School
- Punta Buri National High School
