= Batad, Iloilo =

Municipality in Iloilo, Philippines

Batad
- Municipality
- Municipality of Batad
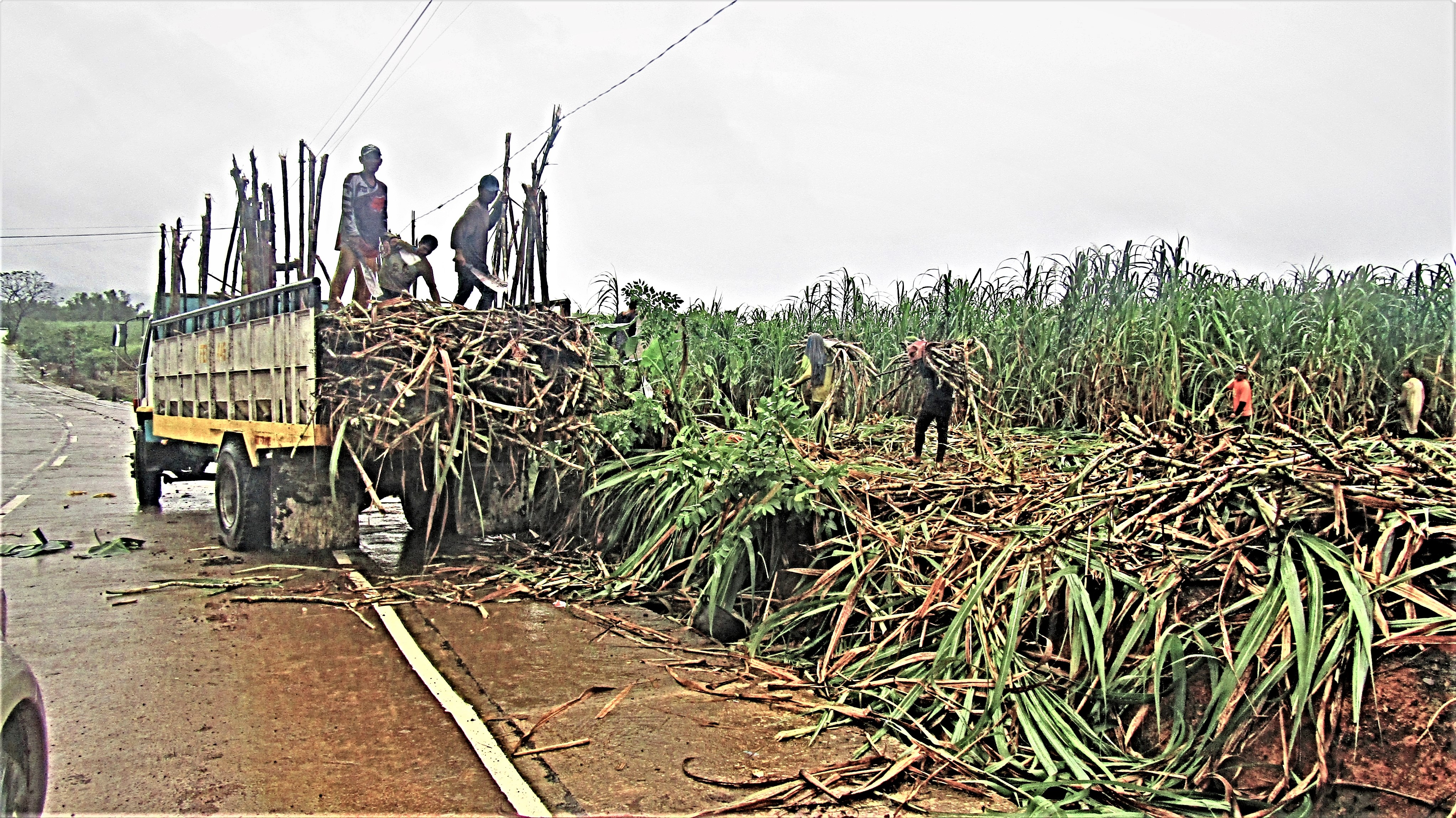
- Sugarcane harvesting in Batad

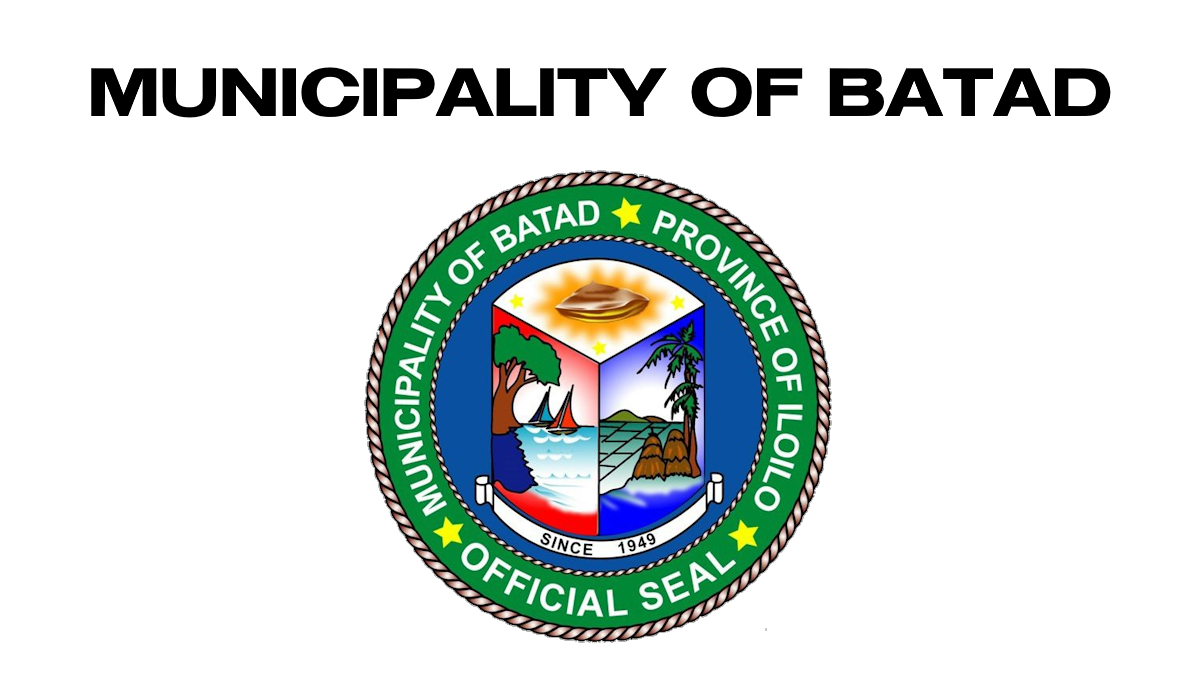
- Flag

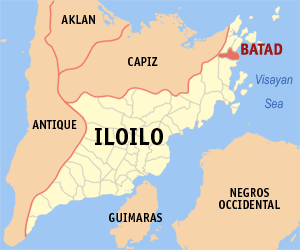
- Map of Iloilo with Batad highlighted
- Interactive map of Batad
- Location within the Philippines
- Coordinates: 11°25′N 123°07′E
- Country: Philippines
- Region: Western Visayas
- Province: Iloilo
- District: 5th district
- Barangays: 24 (see Barangays)

Government
  - Type: Sangguniang Bayan
  - Mayor: Elvira P. Alarcon (PFP)
  - Vice Mayor: Steven Michael Y. Andrada (PFP)
  - Representative: Binky April M. Tupas (Lakas)
  - Municipal Council: Members: Emmanuel U. Pacardo (PFP); Jonifer L. Amantillo(Lakas); Joel V. Agramon (Lakas); Shian Janz P. Balete(Lakas); Cresencio M. Arcosa(Lakas); Thahar A. Pacardo (NPC); Elmo L. Managaytay (PFP); Basilio F. Agramon, Jr. (Lakas); Norly D. Pantig ^{‡}; Jeava Fe B. Arisme ^{◌}; ‡ ex officio ABC president; ◌ ex officio SK chairman
  - Electorate: 15,603 voters (2025)

Area
  - Total: 53.10 km^{2} (20.50 sq mi)
- Elevation: 43 m (141 ft)
- Highest elevation: 630 m (2,070 ft)
- Lowest elevation: 0 m (0 ft)

Population (2024 census)
  - Total: 22,174
  - Density: 417.6/km^{2} (1,082/sq mi)
  - Households: 5,818

Economy
  - Income class: 4th municipal income class
  - Poverty incidence: 19.36% (2023)
  - Revenue: ₱ 122.8 million (2024)
  - Assets: ₱ 517 million (2024)
  - Expenditure: ₱ 125.8 million (2024)
  - Liabilities: ₱ 197.2 million (2024)

Service provider
  - Electricity: Iloilo 3 Electric Cooperative (ILECO 3)
- Time zone: UTC+8 (PST)
- ZIP code: 5016
- PSGC: 063009000
- IDD : area code: +63 (0)33
- Native languages: Hiligaynon; Capisnon; Tagalog
- Website: www.batad.gov.ph

Batad, officially the Municipality of Batad (Hiligaynon: Banwa sang Batad, Tagalog: Bayan ng Batad), is a municipality in the province of Iloilo, Philippines. According to the 2024 census, it has a population of 22,174 people.

In 1950, the barrio of Zarragoza was transferred to the town of Balasan.

== Geography ==
Batad is 122 kilometres (76 mi) north from the provincial capital, Iloilo City, and 65 kilometres (40 mi) from Roxas City.

=== Barangays ===
Batad is politically subdivided into 24 barangays. Each barangay consists of puroks and some have sitios.

- Alapasco
- Alinsolong
- Banban
- Batad Viejo
- Binon-an
- Bolhog
- Bulak Norte
- Bulak Sur
- Cabagohan
- Calangag
- Caw-i
- Drancalan
- Embarcadero
- Hamod
- Malico
- Nangka
- Pasayan
- Poblacion
- Quiazan Florete
- Quiazan Lopez
- Salong
- Santa Ana
- Tanao
- Tapi-an

=== Climate ===
Climate data for Batad, Iloilo
Month	Jan	Feb	Mar	Apr	May	Jun	Jul	Aug	Sep	Oct	Nov	Dec	Year
Mean daily maximum °C (°F)	27 (81)	28 (82)	29 (84)	31 (88)	32 (90)	31 (88)	30 (86)	30 (86)	29 (84)	29 (84)	29 (84)	27 (81)	29 (85)
Mean daily minimum °C (°F)	23 (73)	23 (73)	23 (73)	24 (75)	25 (77)	25 (77)	24 (75)	24 (75)	24 (75)	24 (75)	24 (75)	23 (73)	24 (75)
Average precipitation mm (inches)	61 (2.4)	39 (1.5)	46 (1.8)	48 (1.9)	90 (3.5)	144 (5.7)	152 (6.0)	145 (5.7)	163 (6.4)	160 (6.3)	120 (4.7)	90 (3.5)	1,258 (49.4)
Average rainy days	12.3	9.0	9.9	10.0	18.5	25.0	27.4	26.0	25.9	24.9	17.9	14.2	221
Source: Meteoblue (Use with caution: this is modeled/calculated data, not measured locally.)

== Demographics ==
Population census of Batad
Year	Pop.	±% p.a.
1903	2,133	—
1960	7,712	+2.28%
1970	9,372	+1.97%
1975	9,819	+0.94%
1980	11,790	+3.73%
1990	14,337	+1.98%
1995	15,345	+1.28%
2000	17,009	+2.23%
2007	18,298	+1.01%
2010	19,385	+2.12%
2015	21,298	+1.81%
2020	22,157	+0.84%
2024	22,174	+0.02%
Source: Philippine Statistics Authority

In the 2024 census, the population of Batad was 22,174 people, with a density of 420 inhabitants per square kilometre or 1,100 inhabitants per square mile.

== Economy ==
Poverty incidence of Batad

Source: Philippine Statistics Authority

== Education ==
The Batad Schools District Office governs all educational institutions within the municipality. It oversees the management and operations of all private and public, from primary to secondary schools.

Primary and elementary schools

- Alapasco Primary School
- Banban Primary School
- Batad Adventist Elementary School
- Batad Central Elementary School
- Batad Christian Learning School
- Binon-an Elementary School
- Jose P. Gonzalodo Sr. Elementary School
- Calangag Primary School
- Caw-i Primary School
- Malico Primary School
- Pasayan Primary School
- St. Vincent Ferrer Catholic Learning Center
- Sta. Ana Primary School
- Tanao Elementary School
- Teodoro P. Gomeri Elementary School

Secondary schools

- Batad National High School
- Bulak Integrated School
- Embarcadero Integrated School
- Valerio P. Palmares National High School
