= José Lémery e Ibarrola =

Spanish politician, general (1811–1886)

José Nicolás Francisco Pablo Lémery e Ibarrola
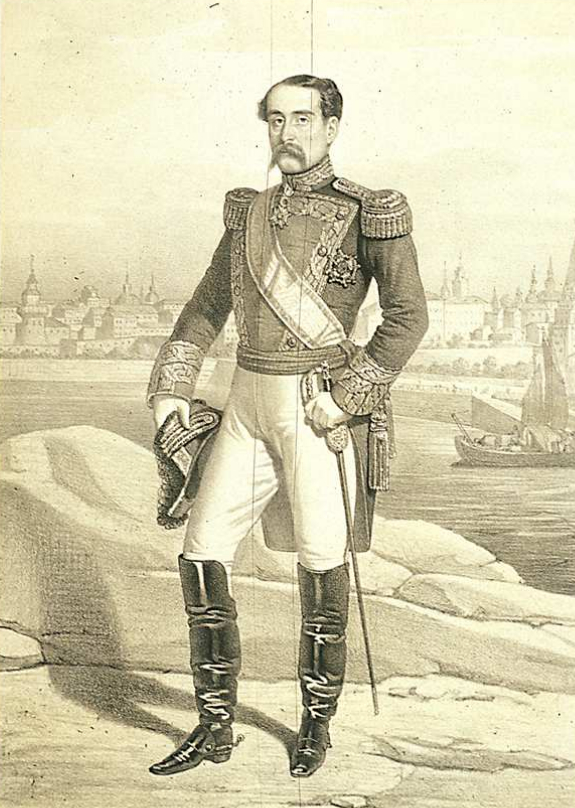
- Lemery in 1852

Senator for life
- In office 1883–1886
- In office 1858–1868

Senator of Baleares
- In office 1881–1884
- In office 1877–1878

82nd Governor-General of the Philippines
- In office 2 February 1861 – 7 July 1862
- Monarch: Isabella II of Spain
- Preceded by: Juan Herrera Dávila
- Succeeded by: Salvador Valdés

109th Governor of Puerto Rico
- In office 1855–1857
- Preceded by: Andrés García Camba
- Succeeded by: Fernando Cotoner y Chacon

Deputy of Baleares
- In office 1854–1855
- Preceded by: Joaquín Francisco Pacheco y Gutiérrez-Calderón
- Succeeded by: Facundo Infante Chacon

Personal details
- Born: 2 December 1811 Madrid, Spain
- Died: 11 April 1886 (aged 74) Madrid, Spain
- Spouse: Flora Ferrer y Álvarez
- Children: María Flora de Lemery y Ferrer, Marquesa de Baroja; Manuela Lemery y Ferrer Ibarrola; Isabel Lemery y Ferrer Ibarrola

Military service
- Allegiance: Spain
- Branch/service: Spanish Army
- Rank: Lieutenant general

José Nicolás Francisco Pablo Lémery-Ney e Ibarrola-González, Marquess of Baroja (2 December 1811 – 11 April 1886) was a Spanish general who served as the 82nd governor-general of the Philippines, 109th governor of Puerto Rico, deputy and senator of Baleares. He was distinguished in his military and political career, striving for justice, equality and fair government in the positions he held.

== Early life and career ==
Lemery was born in Madrid, Spain, on 2 December 1811 to Nicolás Lémery y Ney and Genara Ibarrola y González. He served as the chief military officer of the Spanish royal family, particularly as adjutant of Francis, Duke of Cadiz. In 1848, he married Flora Ferrer y Alvarez Torres. Their children were María Flora de Lemery y Ferrer, Marquesa de Baroja (born 1849), Manuela Lemery y Ferrer Ibarrola (born 1852), and Isabel Lemery y Ferrer Ibarrola (born 1861). In 1854, he succeeded Joaquín Francisco Pacheco y Gutiérrez-Calderón as Deputy of Baleares. In 1855, he was appointed by Queen Isabel II of Spain as Governor of Puerto Rico, where he succeeded Andrés García Camba. Before holding these offices, he had a brief stint in Cuba (1850–1852), wherein he was appointed as commanding general of the colonial armed forces. This appointment was done with the help of his friend, José Gutiérrez de la Concha, 1st Marquis of Havana, who was then serving as Governor of Cuba. He was known to have employed harsh policies in suppressing an "impending rebellion." Among those who were arrested out of suspicion was Joaquín de Agüero, who would lead a rebellion in 1851. In 1858, he was promoted lieutenant general and was elected senator for life (senador vitalicio) in the Senate of Spain.

== Administration of the Philippines ==
On 2 February 1861, while still serving as senator, Lemery began his term as Governor-General of the Philippines. One of the more known reforms during the Lemery administration was the creation of politico-military districts in Visayas and Mindanao pursuant to a royal decree in 1860. This organization was made possible by the relative peace being experienced by the archipelago at the time. In addition, the separation of executive and judicial functions exercised by alcaldes and gobernadorcillos were also implemented. However, this was not done in full measure until 1885, during the term of Emilio Terrero y Perinat. The primary purpose of these reforms was to improve the conditions in the colony to the local level, but friar influence dampened their impact. The lack of continuity in the implementation also contributed to the slow reception of reforms in the local level. The province of Manila was organized and a governor installed. As for Mindanao, wherein the Spaniards had launched a number of military campaigns in the first half of the 19th century, it was divided into six districts. The Central District would serve as the capital of the government organized in Mindanao, and its administrator known as the Governor of Mindanao. The division of politico-military districts in Mindanao were as follows:

- First: Zamboanga District, which includes all of Sibugay Bay, and the west coast of Mindanao as far as Murcielagos Island
- Second: District of the North, which includes all territory north of Mindanao between the boundary line of the First District and Dapitan Point, on Tutwan Bay
- Third: Eastern District, which includes territory between Dapitan Point and Karaga Bay
- Fourth: Davao District, which includes the Bay of Davao and all of southern Mindanao from the boundary of the Third District
- Fifth: Central District, which includes Illana Bay, and all territory between the First and Fourth districts
- Sixth: District of Basilan, which includes the Spanish possessions in Sulu and Basilan

Upon the restoration of the Jesuits in the Philippines, he gave them Mindanao as their mission field. Civil registries (birth, death, marriage registers) were established throughout the archipelago pursuant to a decree in 1861. Also in 1861, the Isabel Gate (Pintong Isabela II) was built between Fort San Gabriel and Fort Santo Domingo in honor of Queen Isabel II of Spain. All municipalities were required to make appropriations for schools to provide basic education and solve the illiteracy problem. The Royal Academy of Fine Arts was established during his administration. In 1862, he handed over his position to Salvador Valdés.

== Senator ==
In 1858, he was promoted lieutenant general and was elected senator for life (senador vitalicio) in the Senate of Spain. In 1862, he was part of the delegation welcoming Infante Francisco de Paula of Spain and Infante Sebastian of Portugal and Spain. In 1866, he presented his adherence to the decision on the modification of the 1851 law concerning the Pacific Squadron. In 1868, he participated in the Senate's March to the Court. In 1877, he was a member of the Commission of Army Promotions. In 1883, he was again senator for life, but by appointment of royal decree and approval of the Permanent Commission.

== Death ==
He died in Madrid on 11 April 1886. The municipalities of Lemery, Batangas, and Lemery, Iloilo, were named in his honor, although the former is said to be actually named after a different person: Captain Roberto Lemery, who died in 1856.

Preceded by Juan Herrera Dávila	Governor General of the Philippines; 1861–1862	Succeeded by Salvador Valdés
Preceded by Andrés García Camba	Governor of Puerto Rico; 1855–1857	Succeeded by Fernando Cotoner y Chacon
