= Lemery, Iloilo =

Municipality in Iloilo, Philippines

Lemery
- Municipality
- Municipality of Lemery
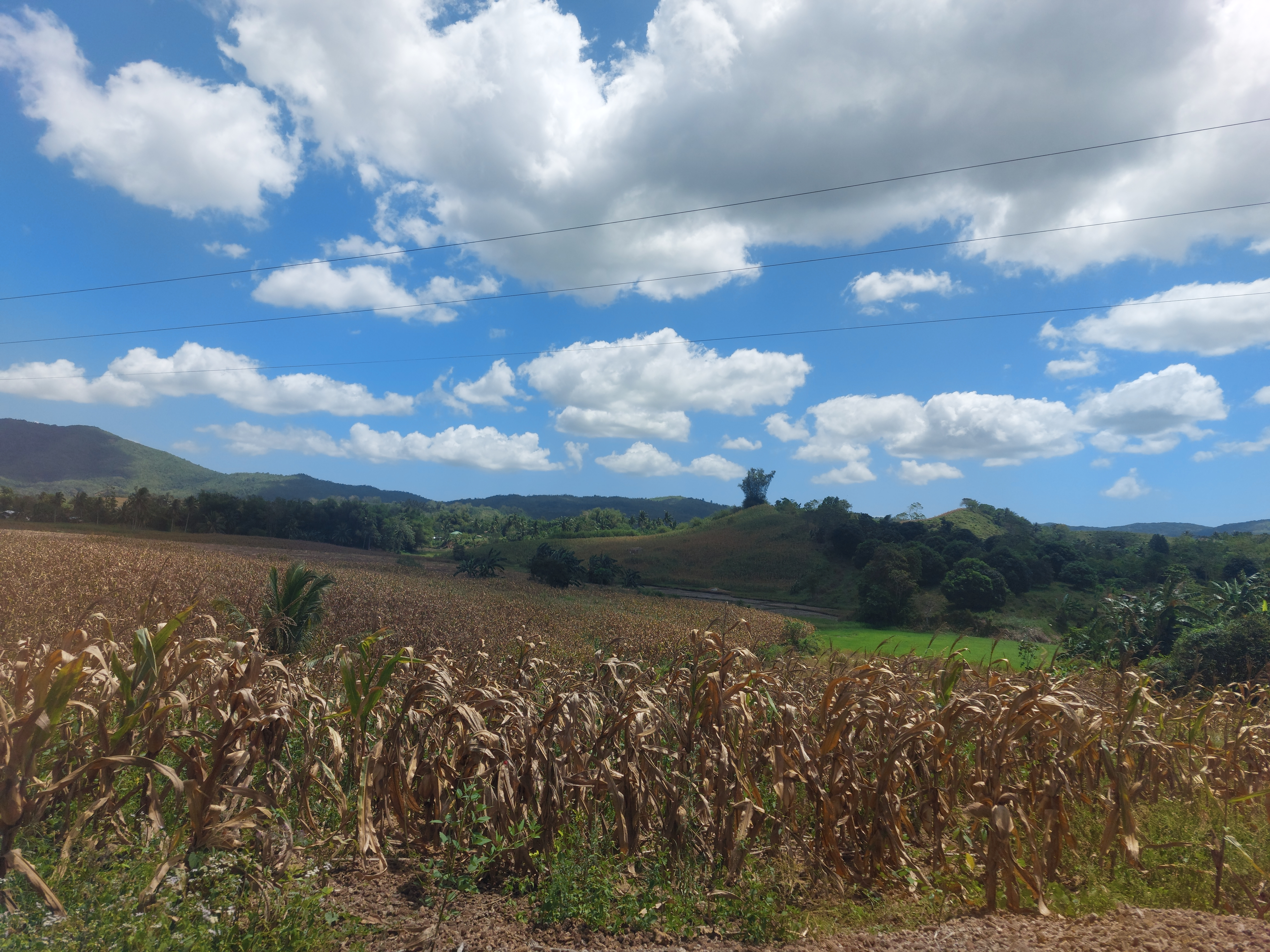
- Sugarcane plantation in Lemery

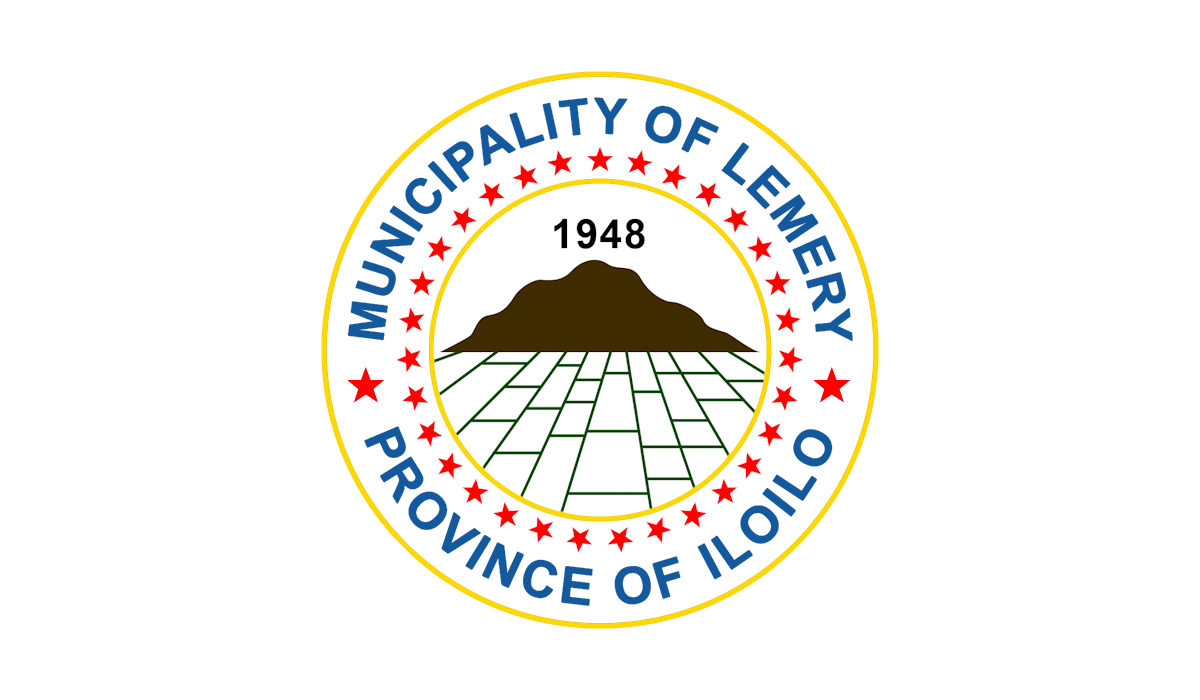
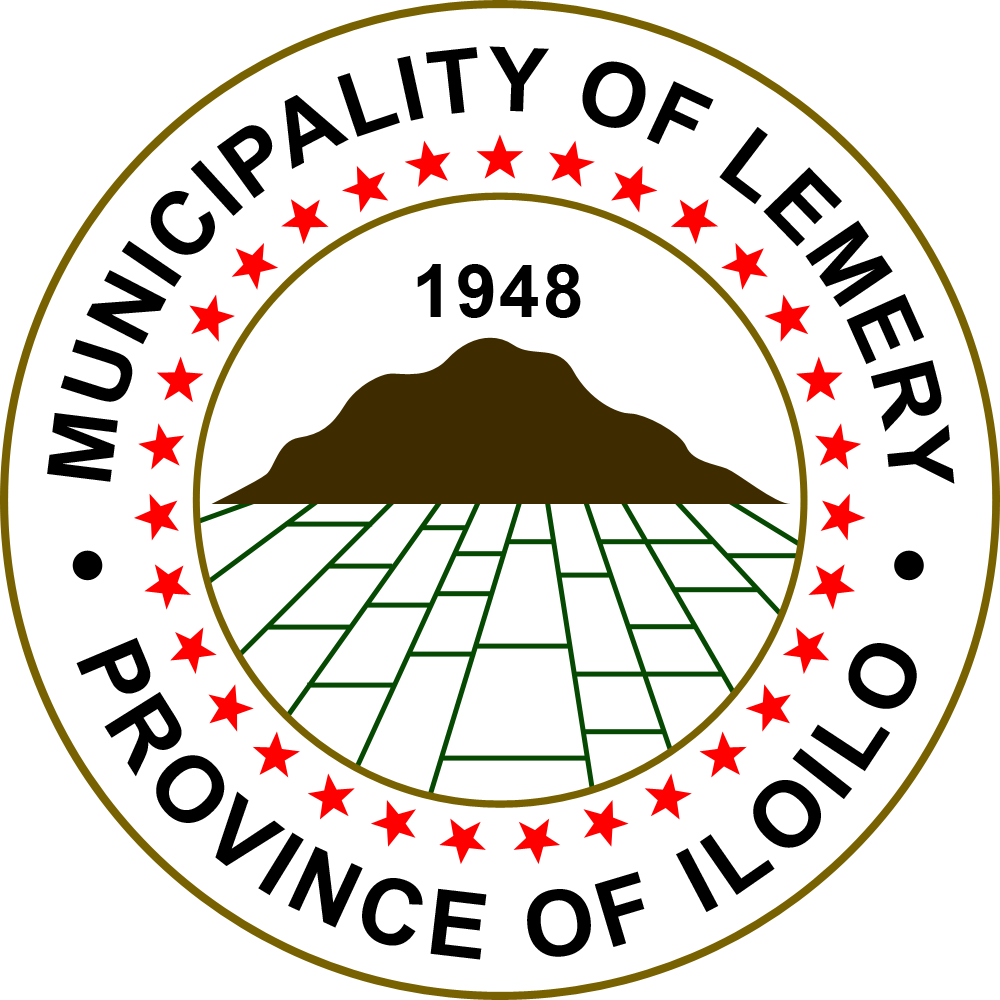
- Flag Seal

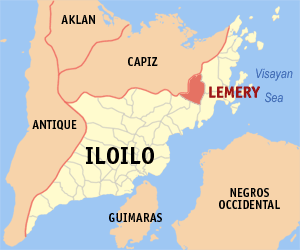
- Map of Iloilo with Lemery highlighted
- Interactive map of Lemery
- Location within the Philippines
- Coordinates: 11°14′N 122°56′E
- Country: Philippines
- Region: Western Visayas
- Province: Iloilo
- District: 5th district
- Founded: 1947
- Named for: José Lémery e Ibarrola
- Barangays: 31 (see Barangays)

Government
  - Type: Sangguniang Bayan
  - Mayor: Oscar C. Villegas Jr. (Lakas)
  - Vice Mayor: Lowel T. Arban (Lakas)
  - Representative: Binky April M. Tupas (Lakas)
  - Municipal Council: Members: Julius O. Santiago (Lakas); Remo C. Villegas (Lakas); Kristian Chif A. Ballener (Lakas); Romeo F. Teneso, Jr. (Lakas); Niel P. Almeñana (Lakas); Junmar J. Sepanton (Lakas); Nikki Anne Dominique D. Diamante (Lakas); Limwel T. Arban (Lakas); Pedro P. Suyo Jr. ^{‡}; Wilbert D. Pacificiar ^{◌}; ‡ ex officio ABC president; ◌ ex officio SK chairman
  - Electorate: 22,444 voters (2025)

Area
  - Total: 119.90 km^{2} (46.29 sq mi)
- Elevation: 121 m (397 ft)
- Highest elevation: 434 m (1,424 ft)
- Lowest elevation: 58 m (190 ft)

Population (2024 census)
  - Total: 32,836
  - Density: 273.86/km^{2} (709.30/sq mi)
  - Households: 8,718

Economy
  - Income class: 3rd municipal income class
  - Poverty incidence: 19.2% (2023)
  - Revenue: ₱ 162.6 million (2024)
  - Assets: ₱ 605.1 million (2024)
  - Expenditure: ₱ 54.39 million (2024)
  - Liabilities: ₱ 120 million (2024)

Service provider
  - Electricity: Iloilo 3 Electric Cooperative (ILECO 3)
- Time zone: UTC+8 (PST)
- ZIP code: 5043
- PSGC: 063027000
- IDD : area code: +63 (0)33
- Native languages: Hiligaynon; Capisnon; Tagalog
- Website: www.lemery.gov.ph

Lemery, officially the Municipality of Lemery (Hiligaynon: Banwa sang Lemery, Tagalog: Bayan ng Lemery), is a municipality in the province of Iloilo, Philippines. According to the 2024 census, it has a population of 32,836 people.

== History ==
Lemery was created from the barrios of Lemery, Tabunan, Tuburan, Nagsulang, Daga, Tuguis, Singcua, Agpipili, Pacuan, Milan, Alagiñgay, Tuga, Bajo, San Antonio, Capeñahan, Bankal, Geroñgan, Omio, Nasapahan, Abuac-Dalipe, San Jose, Cabantohan, Dapdapan, Butuan, Anabo, and Buenavista from the municipality of Sara by virtue of Republic Act No. 197, enacted June 22, 1947. It was named after José Lémery e Ibarrola, the 82nd Governor-General of the Philippines.

== Geography ==
Lemery is 87 kilometres (54 mi) from Iloilo City and 99 kilometres (62 mi) from Roxas City.

=== Barangays ===
Lemery is politically subdivided into 31 barangays. Each barangay consists of puroks and some have sitios.

- Agpipili
- Alcantara
- Almeñana (Tuguis)
- Anabo
- Bankal
- Buenavista
- Cabantohan
- Capiñahan
- Dalipe
- Dapdapan
- Gerongan
- Imbaulan
- Layogbato
- Marapal
- Milan
- Nagsulang
- Nasapahan
- Omio
- Pacuan
- Poblacion NW Zone
- Poblacion SE Zone
- Pontoc
- San Antonio
- San Diego
- San Jose Moto
- Sepanton
- Sincua
- Tabunan
- Tugas
- Velasco
- Yawyawan

=== Climate ===
Climate data for Lemery, Iloilo
Month	Jan	Feb	Mar	Apr	May	Jun	Jul	Aug	Sep	Oct	Nov	Dec	Year
Mean daily maximum °C (°F)	27 (81)	28 (82)	29 (84)	31 (88)	31 (88)	30 (86)	29 (84)	29 (84)	29 (84)	29 (84)	28 (82)	27 (81)	29 (84)
Mean daily minimum °C (°F)	22 (72)	22 (72)	22 (72)	23 (73)	24 (75)	24 (75)	24 (75)	24 (75)	24 (75)	24 (75)	23 (73)	23 (73)	23 (74)
Average precipitation mm (inches)	61 (2.4)	39 (1.5)	46 (1.8)	48 (1.9)	90 (3.5)	144 (5.7)	152 (6.0)	145 (5.7)	163 (6.4)	160 (6.3)	120 (4.7)	90 (3.5)	1,258 (49.4)
Average rainy days	12.3	9.0	9.9	10.0	18.5	25.0	27.4	26.0	25.9	24.9	17.9	14.2	221
Source: Meteoblue

== Demographics ==
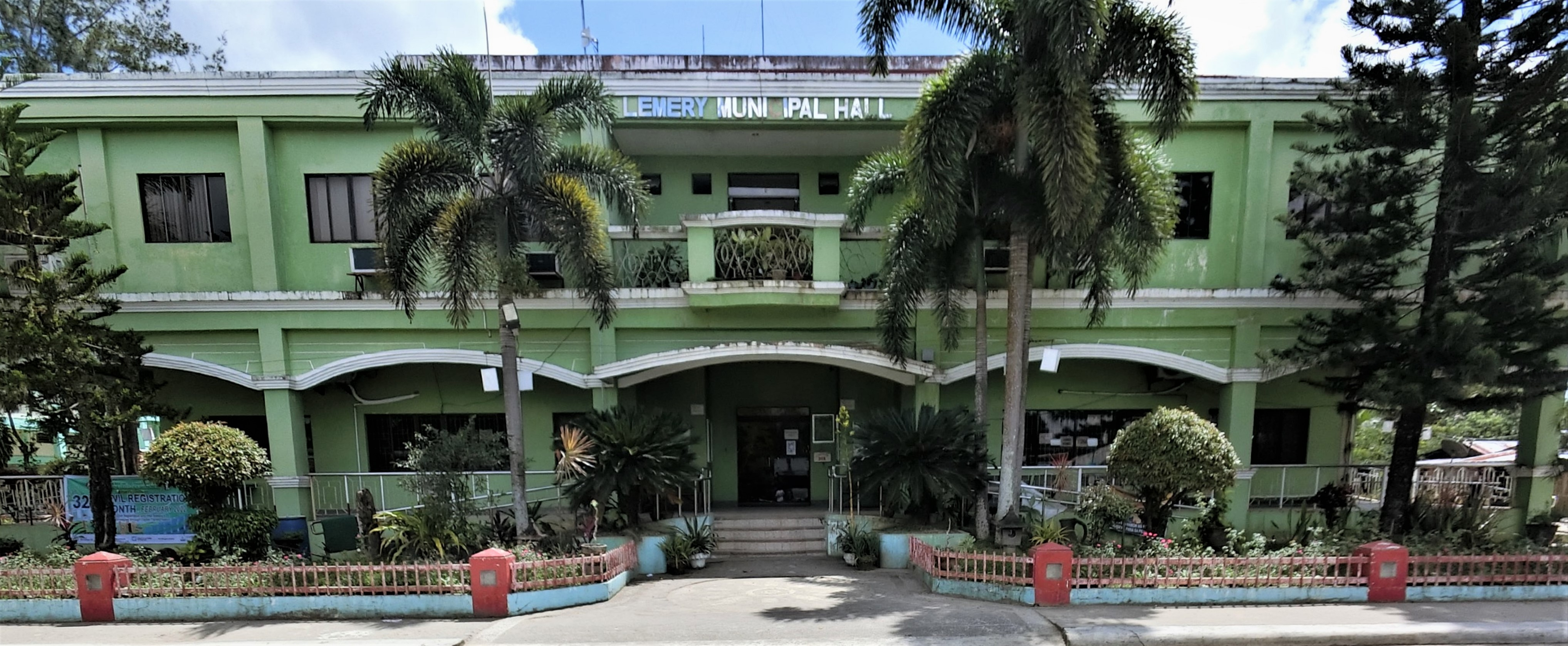
Lemery Municipal Hall

Population census of Lemery

Year	Pop.	±% p.a.
1903	2,630	—
1948	7,137	+2.24%
1960	8,017	+0.97%
1970	10,591	+2.82%
1975	13,357	+4.76%
1980	15,707	+3.29%
1990	19,900	+2.39%

Year	Pop.	±% p.a.
1995	20,863	+0.89%
2000	23,546	+2.63%
2007	25,017	+0.84%
2010	27,441	+3.42%
2015	30,851	+2.26%
2020	31,414	+0.38%
2024	32,836	+1.07%

Source: Philippine Statistics Authority

In the 2024 census, the population of Lemery was 32,836 people, with a density of 270 inhabitants per square kilometre or 700 inhabitants per square mile.

== Economy ==
Poverty incidence of Lemery (%)

Source: Philippine Statistics Authority
