= Sara, Iloilo =

Municipality in Iloilo, Philippines

Sara
- Municipality
- Municipality of Sara
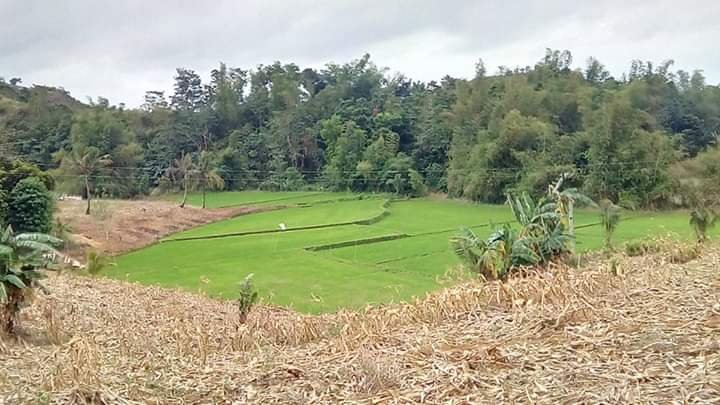
- Typical farm in Sara

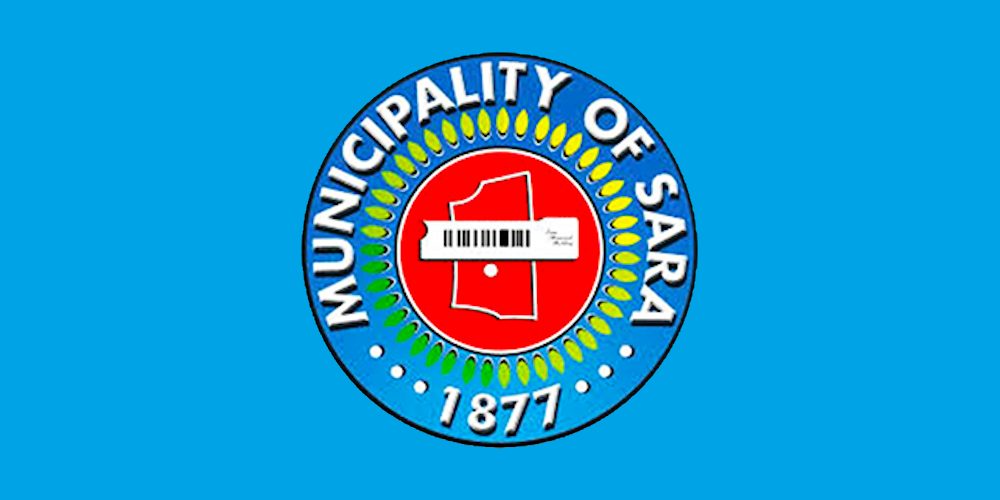
- Flag Seal

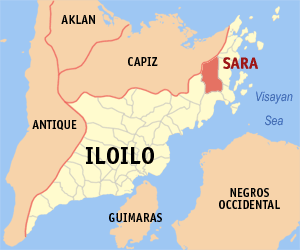
- Map of Iloilo with Sara highlighted
- Interactive map of Sara
- Location within the Philippines
- Coordinates: 11°15′22″N 123°00′50″E
- Country: Philippines
- Region: Western Visayas
- Province: Iloilo
- District: 5th district
- Barangays: 42 (see Barangays)

Government
  - Type: Sangguniang Bayan
  - Mayor: Jon N. Aying (PDP)
  - Vice Mayor: Ryan S. Zerrudo (PDP)
  - Representative: Binky April M. Tupas (Lakas)
  - Municipal Council: Members: Kristine Z. Valencia (PDP); Mychel M. Saber (Ind); Richie P. Segura (Lakas); Renato B. Pastrana (PDP); Joseph N. Aying (PDP); Rey G. Canindo (PDP); Mary Patricia B. Alcantara (Lakas); Antonio Martin S. Tedoco, III (PFP); Nilo P. Delos Santos ^{‡}; Esara Andica A. Javier ^{◌}; ‡ ex officio ABC president; ◌ ex officio SK chairman
  - Electorate: 38,464 voters (2025)

Area
  - Total: 169.02 km^{2} (65.26 sq mi)
- Elevation: 50 m (160 ft)
- Highest elevation: 245 m (804 ft)
- Lowest elevation: 9 m (30 ft)

Population (2024 census)
  - Total: 55,476
  - Density: 328.22/km^{2} (850.09/sq mi)
  - Households: 14,218

Economy
  - Income class: 1st municipal income class
  - Poverty incidence: 17.37% (2023)
  - Revenue: ₱ 273.2 million (2024)
  - Assets: ₱ 468.3 million (2024)
  - Expenditure: ₱ 258.1 million (2024)
  - Liabilities: ₱ 116.9 million (2024)

Service provider
  - Electricity: Iloilo 3 Electric Cooperative (ILECO 3)
- Time zone: UTC+8 (PST)
- ZIP code: 5014
- PSGC: 0603044000
- IDD : area code: +63 (0)33
- Native languages: Hiligaynon; Capisnon; Tagalog
- Website: sarailoilo.com

Sara, officially the Municipality of Sara (Hiligaynon: Banwa sang Sara, Tagalog: Bayan ng Sara), is a municipality in the province of Iloilo, Philippines. According to the 2024 census, it has a population of 55,476 people.

== History ==
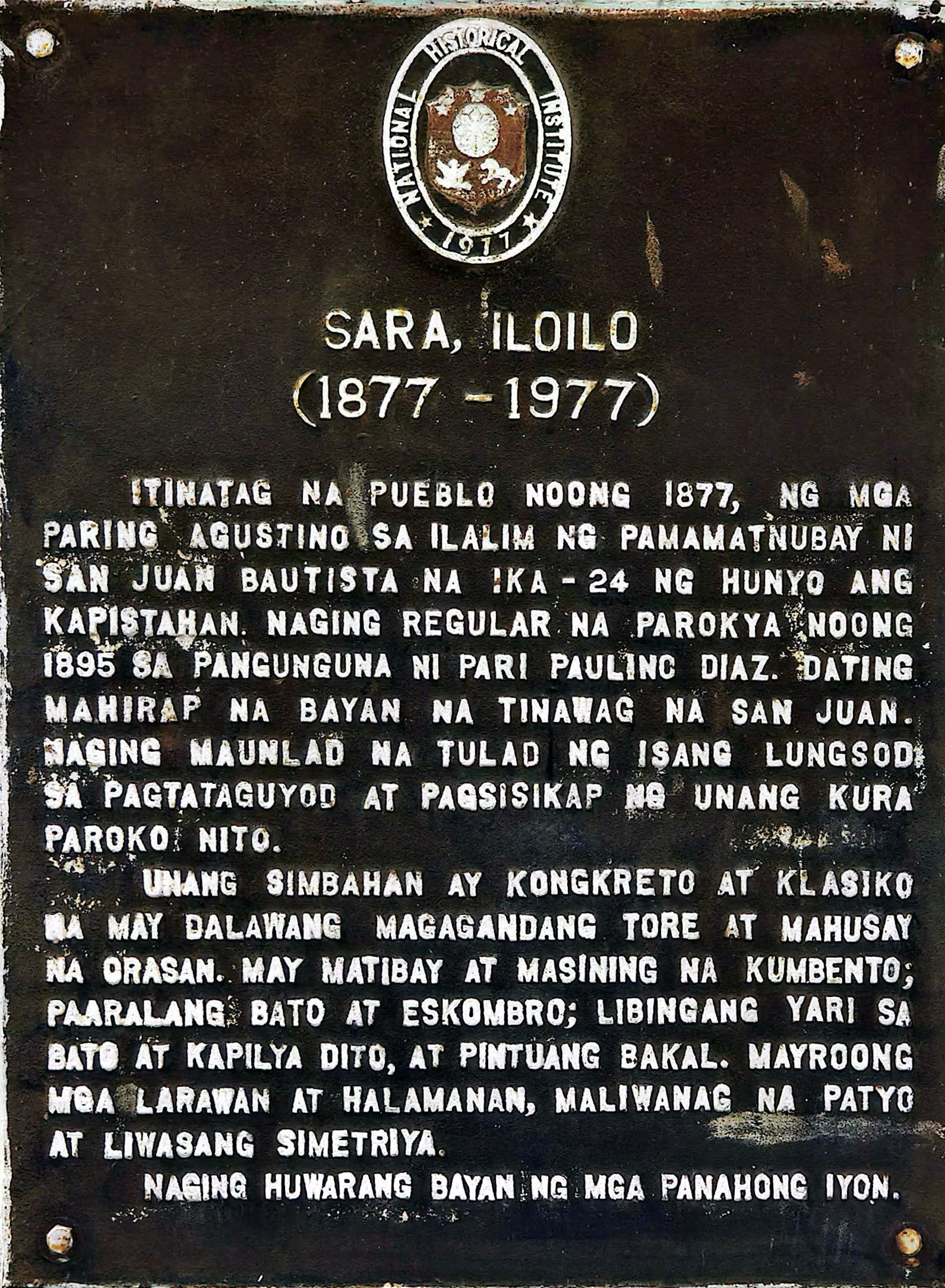
NHI marker installed on December 2, 1977 located at the present Municipal Building.

1877– the Spaniards who have travelled the northward coast of Iloilo had discovered natives who with their houses built near the seashore called this "Lakdayan". The Spaniards established a seat of government in Concepcion. Its surrounding barrios are San Dionisio, Ajuy and Sara. The head of the local government of Concepcion was called Kapitan while the subordinate leaders in San Dionisio were called Tenientes and Cabezas de Barangay.

Barangay of San Dionisio includes

1. Odiongan
2. Capinang
3. Cudionan
4. Bagacay
5. Nipa

1877 – A village of San Juan separated from Concepcion and became a town . San Dionisio and Lemery were attached to San Juan . The Augustinians Fathers founded Sara into a "pueblo" under the patronage of Saint John the Baptist, whose feast is celebrated on June 24. Formerly, it's just barrio San Juan that includes much of Ajuy. It became a regular parish in 1895 with father Paulino Diaz as curate.

Barangay of Sara Ilongbukid, Maremhon, Lawa-an, Bai-ran, Batuan, Agsinapot, Maligayligay, Samponongbolo, Alabidhan, Ambolong, Busay, Caburra, Asue Pabriaga, Balabago, Alawehao, Quinasop-an, Bolod, Aglahog, Madarag, Serruco, Salvacion, Ajuz, Talisay, Masonson, Quipot, Quipot, Damasco.

Sara and Ajuy remained the top sugar producers in Iloilo until the onset of the American colonization, followed by Balasan, Passi and Dingle (Panay Directory and Souvenir Book, 1937).

In 1928, the Central Azucarera de Sara-Ajuy was incorporated by the Ynchausti y Cia, and established a sugar mill in Ajuy (Annual Report of the Governor General of the Philippine Islands, 1929).

Sara-Ajuy sugar central's production steadily increased, starting with 1,842 tons in 1929, it climbed to 4,046 tons and 4,716 tons in 1930 and 1931, respectively (American Chamber of Commerce Journal, August 1931).

It became the top sugar producer in Iloilo by the late 1930s, followed by the Central Santos-Lopez in Barotac Nuevo, the Philippine Starch and Sugar Co. in Janiuay and the Central Lourdes in Dingle.

Before World War II broke out, the Central Azucarera de Sara-Ajuy recorded a production of 108,725.52 piculs during the crop year 1941–1942.

"However, in the course of the Japanese invasion... there came a total blackout on the sugar milling activities," wrote historian Henry Funtecha in "Iloilo in the 20th Century: An Economic History (1997)".

After the war, Central Azucarera de Sara-Ajuy briefly resumed operations but found it difficult to recover until it eventually closed.

Sara District Hospital was founded in 1960s in Anoring, Sara as co-referral hospital for Lemery, San Dionisio, Ajuy and Conception, Iloilo.

== Geography ==
Sara is 98 kilometres (61 mi) from Iloilo City and is 89 kilometres (55 mi) from Roxas City, Capiz and 639 kilometres (397 mi) from the Philippine capital of Manila.

=== Barangays ===
Sara is politically subdivided into 42 barangays. Each barangay consists of puroks and some have sitios.

- Aguirre
- Aldeguer
- Alibayog
- Anoring
- Apelo
- Apologista
- Aposaga
- Arante
- Ardemil
- Aspera
- Aswe-Pabriaga
- Bagaygay
- Bakabak
- Batitao
- Bato
- Del Castillo
- Castor
- Crespo
- Devera
- Domingo
- Ferraris
- Gildore
- Improgo
- Juaneza
- Labigan
- Lanciola
- Latawan
- Malapaya
- Muyco
- Padios
- Pasig
- Poblacion Ilawod
- Poblacion Ilaya
- Poblacion Market
- Posadas
- Preciosa
- Salcedo
- San Luis
- Tady
- Tentay
- Villahermosa
- Zerrudo

=== 1957 renaming ===
In 1957, Congress enacted Republic Act No. 1733 which renamed a lot of these barangays.

Old Name	New Name
Ilongbukid	Bagaygay
Maremhon	Villahermosa
Lawa-an	Gildore
Bai-ran	Castor
Batuan	Aldeguer
Agsinapot	Del Castillo
Maligayligay	Malapaya
Samponongbolo	Juaneza
Alabidhan	Tady
Ambolong	Lanciola
Busay	Preciosa
Caburra	Zerrudo
Asue Pabriaga	Pabriaga
Balabago	Apologista
Alawehao	Posadas
Quinasop-an	Muyco
Bolod	Padios
Aglahog	Bacabac
Madarag	Crespo
Serruco	Ferraris
Salvacion	Arante
Ajuz	Salcedo
Talisay	Apelo
Masonson	Devera
Quipot	Aguirre
Damasco	Aspera
Agkawayan	Improgo

== Demographics ==
Population census of Sara
Year	Pop.	±% p.a.
1903	11,366	—
1918	26,908	+5.91%
1939	22,419	−0.87%
1948	16,042	−3.65%
1960	17,837	+0.89%
1970	21,824	+2.04%
1975	24,892	+2.67%
1980	28,838	+2.99%
1990	36,707	+2.44%
1995	38,652	+0.97%
2000	42,363	+1.98%
2007	45,005	+0.84%
2010	46,889	+1.50%
2015	52,631	+2.22%
2020	54,637	+0.79%
2024	55,476	+0.37%
Source: Philippine Statistics Authority

In the 2024 census, the population of Sara was 55,476 people, with a density of 330 inhabitants per square kilometre or 850 inhabitants per square mile.

== Climate ==
Climate data for Sara, Iloilo
Month	Jan	Feb	Mar	Apr	May	Jun	Jul	Aug	Sep	Oct	Nov	Dec	Year
Mean daily maximum °C (°F)	27 (81)	28 (82)	29 (84)	31 (88)	32 (90)	31 (88)	30 (86)	30 (86)	29 (84)	29 (84)	28 (82)	27 (81)	29 (85)
Mean daily minimum °C (°F)	23 (73)	23 (73)	23 (73)	24 (75)	25 (77)	25 (77)	24 (75)	24 (75)	24 (75)	24 (75)	24 (75)	23 (73)	24 (75)
Average precipitation mm (inches)	61 (2.4)	39 (1.5)	46 (1.8)	48 (1.9)	90 (3.5)	144 (5.7)	152 (6.0)	145 (5.7)	163 (6.4)	160 (6.3)	120 (4.7)	90 (3.5)	1,258 (49.4)
Average rainy days	12.3	9.0	9.9	10.0	18.5	25.0	27.4	26.0	25.9	24.9	17.9	14.2	221
Source: Meteoblue

== Economy ==
Poverty incidence of Sara (%)

Source: Philippine Statistics Authority

Sara is the Banking Center in Northern Iloilo where a number of banks are located such as Land Bank of the Philippines, RCBC and one network bank. Gaisano Grand Mall – Sara was opened on July 31, 2019.

== Media ==
- 105.3 DYPT Radyo Kidlat Sara
- 107.5 Hot FM
- List of Radio & Television Station in Iloilo
