= Binky Tupas =

Filipino politician (born 1979)

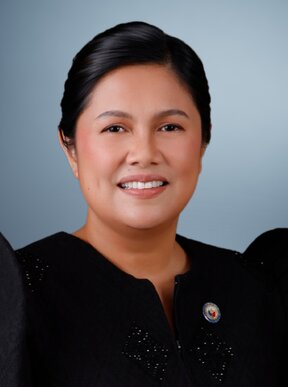
- Official portrait, 2025

Member of the House of Representatives of the Philippines from Iloilo's 5th District
- Incumbent
- Assumed office June 30, 2025
- Preceded by: Raul Tupas

Member of the Iloilo Provincial Board from the 5th district
- In office June 30, 2022 – June 30, 2025

Personal details
- Born: April 11, 1979 (age 47) Cagayan de Oro City, Misamis Oriental, Philippines
- Party: Lakas (2024–present)
- Other political affiliations: Nacionalista (2021–2024)
- Spouse: Raul Tupas

Binky April Montesclaros Tupas (born April 11, 1979) is a Filipino architect and politician who is a member of the House of Representatives.

She is the first woman to represent Iloilo's 5th congressional district having been elected in 2025. She defeated her husband's estranged elder brother Junjun Tupas.

She succeeded her husband, Raul Tupas.

== See also ==
- List of female members of the House of Representatives of the Philippines
