= Jalaur Dam =

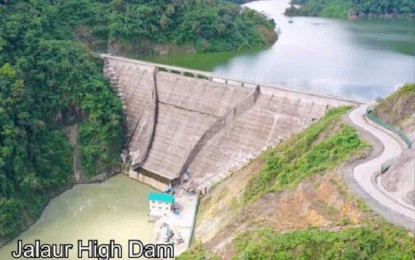

- Location in Visayas Location in the Philippines
- Official name: Jalaur River Multi-Purpose Project Stage II
- Location: Calinog, Iloilo, Philippines
- Coordinates: 11°10′23″N 122°27′38″E
- Construction began: February 2019
- Opening date: July 16, 2025
- Construction cost: Php 19,000,000,000
- Operator: National Irrigation Administration

Dam and spillways
- Impounds: Jalaur River
- Height: 109 m (358 ft)
- Length: 267 m (876 ft)
- Spillways: 1

Reservoir
- Creates: Jalaur Reservoir
- Total capacity: 250.7×10^{6} m^{3} (8.85×10^{9} cu ft) with no sedimentation
- Catchment area: 107 km^{2} (41 sq mi)

Power Station
- Installed capacity: 6.6 mW projected
- Website https://jrmp.nia.gov.ph/

The Jalaur Dam or more formally known as the Jalaur River Multi-Purpose Project Stage II (JRMP II) located in the municipality of Calinog, Iloilo, is the first major water reservoir developed in the Visayas and Mindanao. It also serves as the National Irrigation Administration's flagship initiative in Western Visayas.

The project is designed to promote inclusive growth by utilizing the Jalaur River for a range of purposes while keeping environmental and community impacts to a minimum. Its key benefits include year-round irrigation, bulk water supply, hydropower generation, and opportunities for eco-tourism, among others. The project will support several areas, including the municipalities of Calinog, Lambunao, Badiangan, Janiuay, Cabatuan, Santa Barbara, Pavia, Alimodian, Leon, San Miguel, Oton, Tigbauan, Dueñas, San Enrique, Anilao, Dingle, Barotac Nuevo, Dumangas, Mina, New Lucena, Pototan, Zarraga, Leganes, as well as Passi City and Iloilo City.

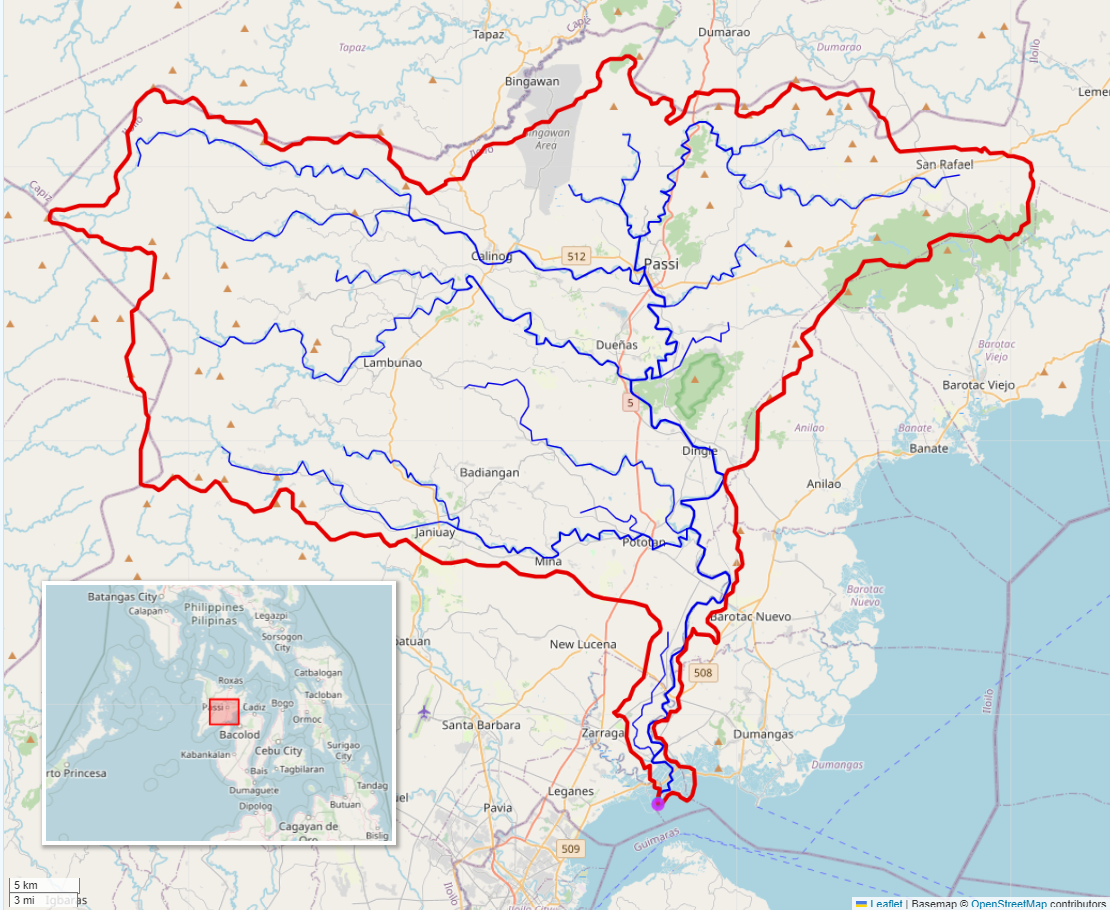
Map showing the Jalaur River basin. The Jalaur Dam is located at the most northwestern tributary of the river system.

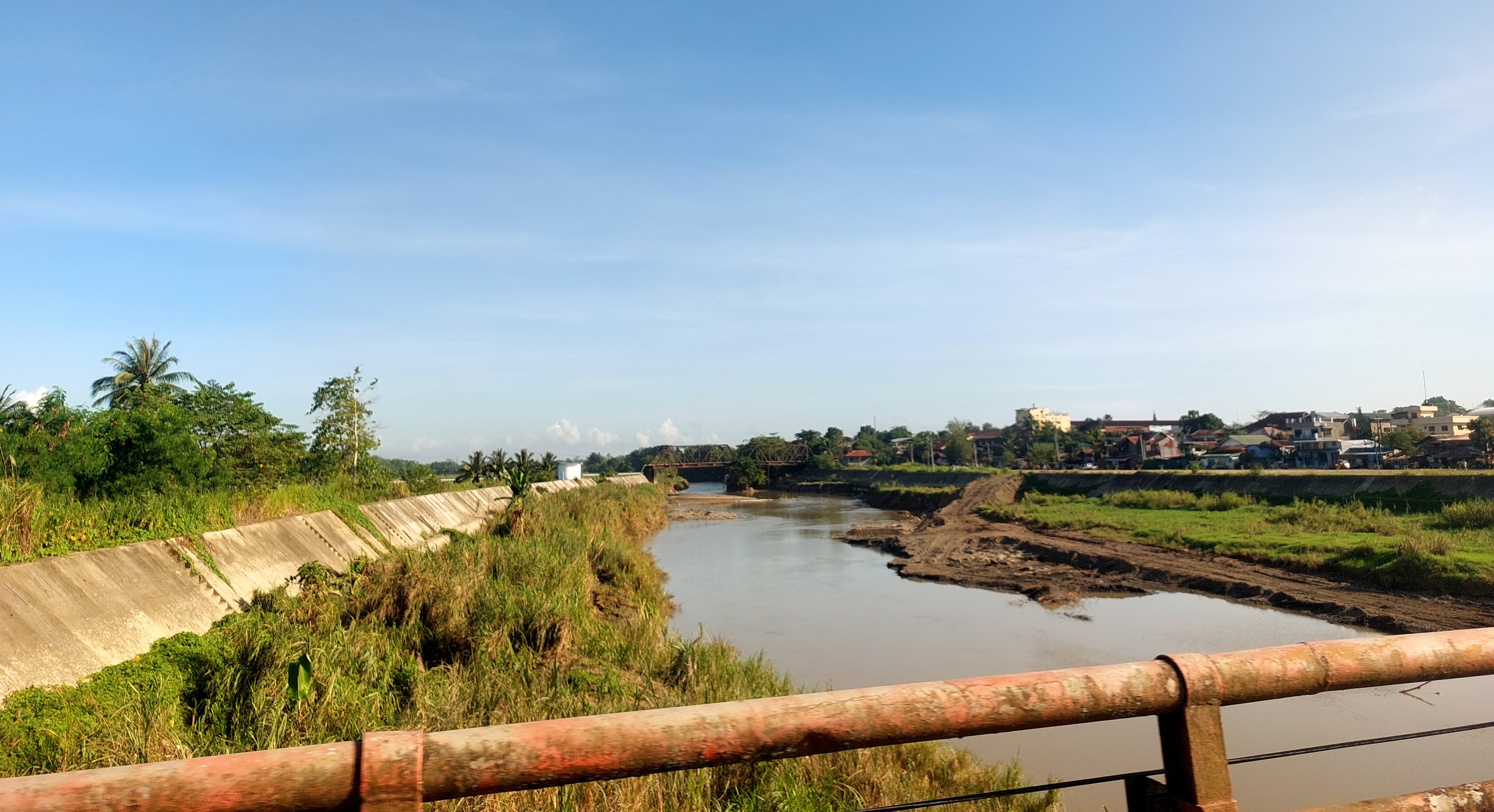
Jalaur River in Passi City, Iloilo 05-2022

== History ==
JRMP was initially carried out by the National Irrigation Administration in the 1960s following the enactment of Republic Act 2651 on June 18, 1960, which authorized the construction and future operation of the Jalaur Multi-Purpose Project in Iloilo.

The project's first phase was completed in the 1980s, and its second stage began in 2012 after gaining approval from the National Economic and Development Authority Board, backed by an Economic Internal Rate of Return of 16.26%. The second stage, built by Daewoo Engineering and Construction Co., Ltd. and partly funded by the Export–Import Bank of Korea, consists of three major components—Irrigation Development, Environmental and Watershed Management, and Institutional Development.

Under the Irrigation Development, JRMP II includes the construction of three dams in Calinog and a high line canal extending through nine municipalities from Calinog to Oton, along with the rehabilitation and modernization of the province's existing National Irrigation Systems. The dam was inaugurated by President Bongbong Marcos on July 16, 2025. From its groundbreaking ceremony in 2019 until its inauguration in 2025, it took six years for the structure to finally become operational.

== Geography ==
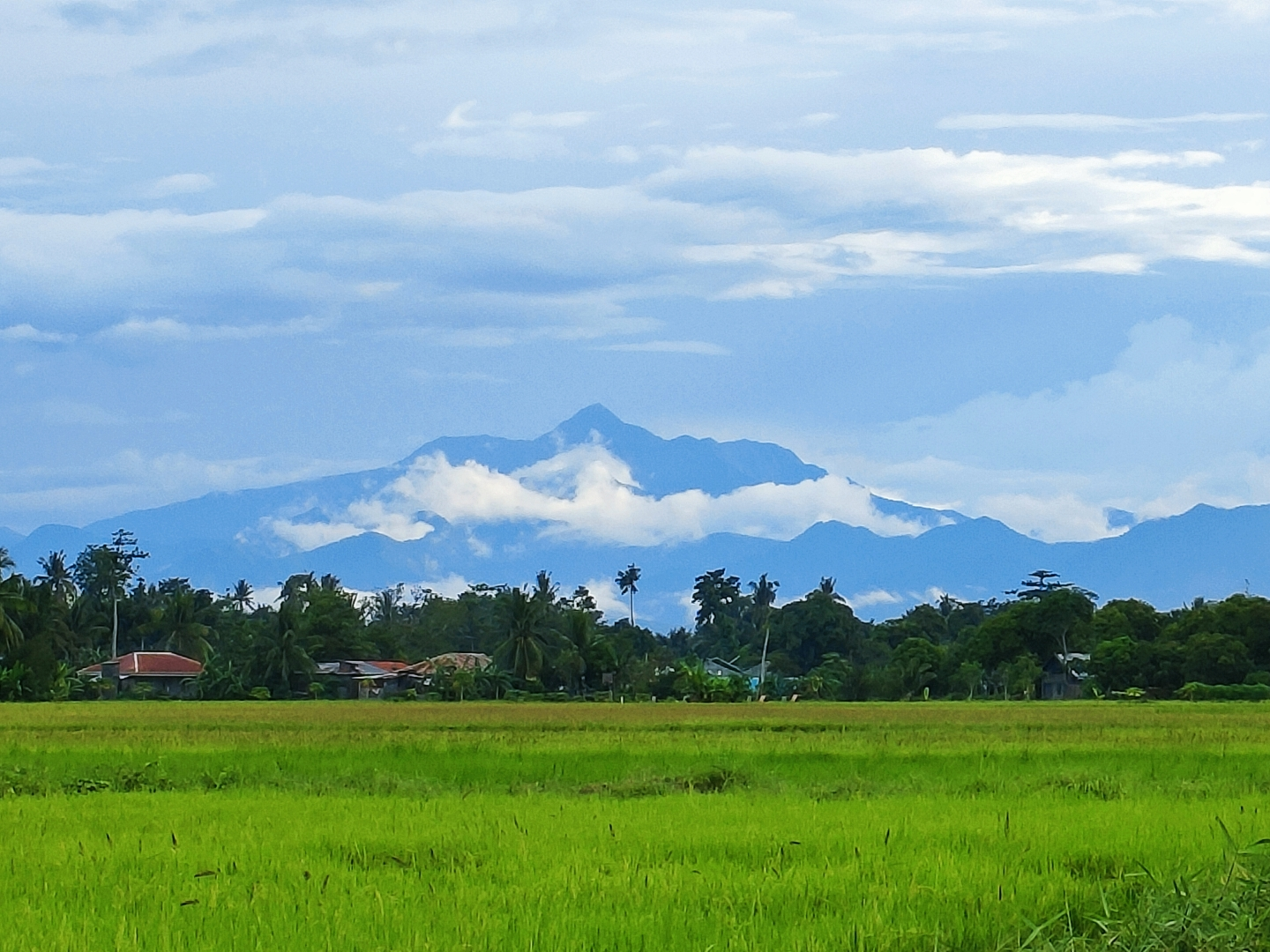
This is Mt. Madja-as, the 2nd highest mountain in the Visayas and the highest peak of the Central Panay Mountain Range with an elevation of 2,117 meters asl.

The dam is situated in one of the terminal tributaries of the Jalaur River, the second largest river in Panay Island, after the Panay River in the neighboring province of Capiz to the north. The dam is located directly to the east of the Central Panay Mountain Range, the location of its watershed.

The dam has also been a focus of concerns due to its location just 9.8 kilometers east of the West Panay Fault, the source of the destructive 1948 Lady Caycay Earthquake that destroyed many buildings, including heritage sites and churches all around Panay Island.

== Current status ==
Although the dam structure itself is already operational, the National Irrigation Administration aims to complete all remaining civil works for the Jalaur River Multipurpose Project Stage 2 (JRMP 2) in Calinog, Iloilo, by October 2027, signaling renewed momentum for one of Western Visayas' largest infrastructure undertakings. On November 4, NIA-6 reported that the Economy and Development Council, led by President Bongbong Marcos, approved the project's restructuring, which includes an additional ₱5.96 billion to finalize its irrigation component.

With its completion, the PHP19-billion Jalaur River Multipurpose Project II (JRMP II) in Calinog, Iloilo, is considered a transformative development for the region, expected to strengthen national food security efforts and help curb inflation. The dam is projected to boost rice production by more than 300 metric tons, providing year-round irrigation to 31,840 hectares of farmland and benefiting roughly 25,000 farming households. In addition, it will supply Iloilo City with an estimated 86,000 cubic meters of water daily and generate about 6.8 megawatts of electricity.

== See also ==
- Water supply and sanitation in the Philippines
- Energy in the Philippines
