= Passi, Iloilo =

Component city in Iloilo, Philippines

Passi
- Component city
- City of Passi
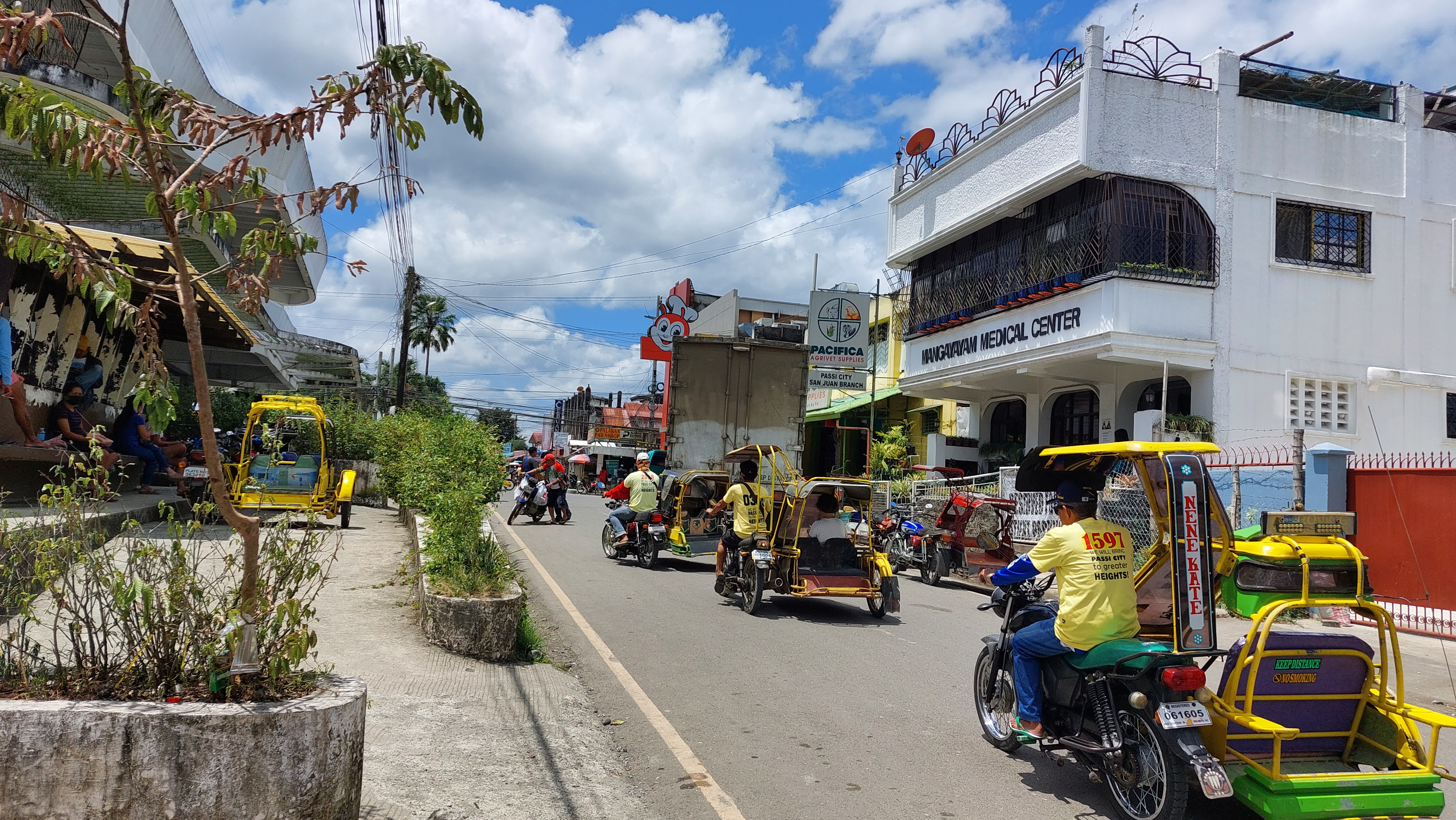
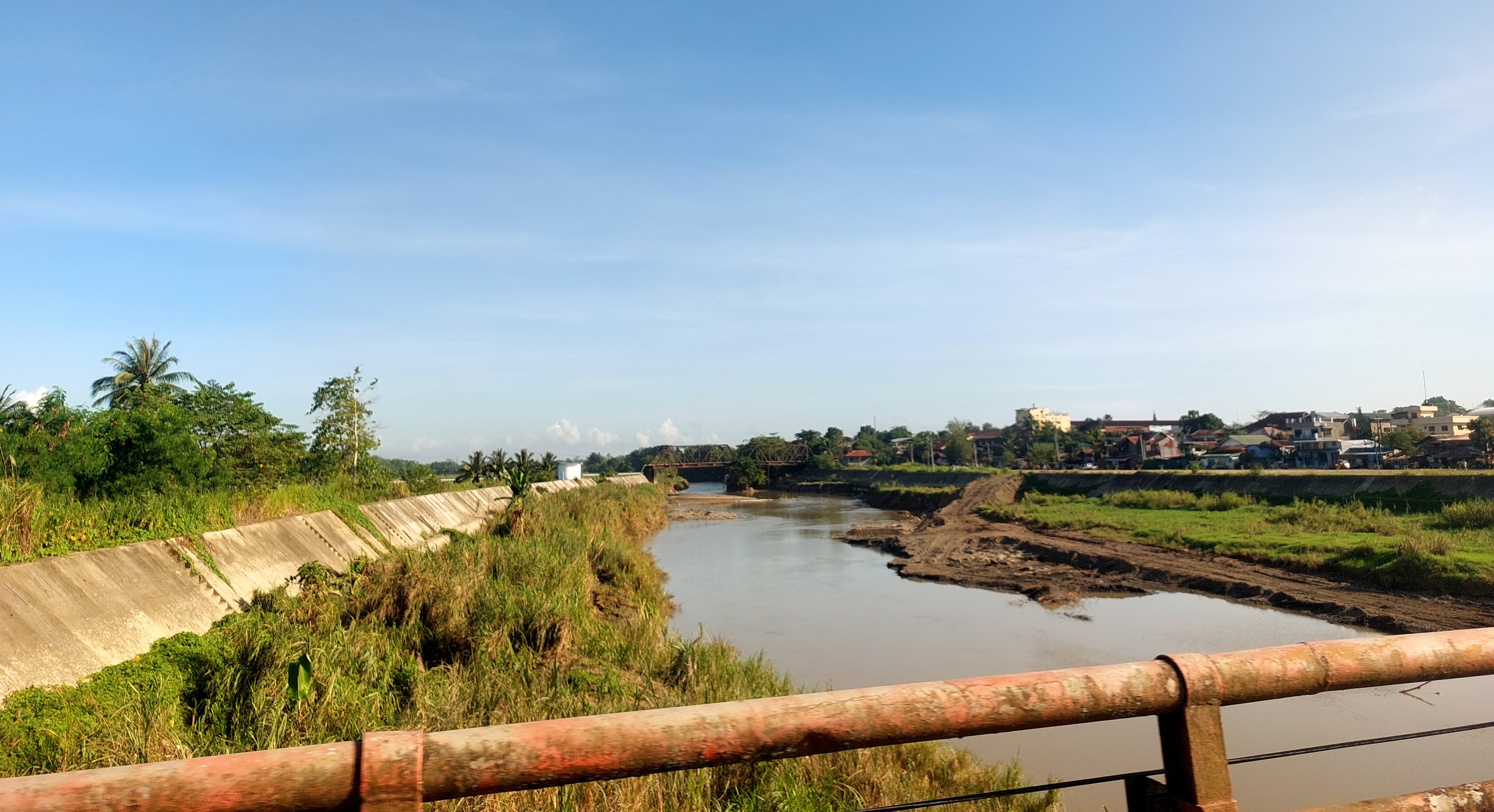
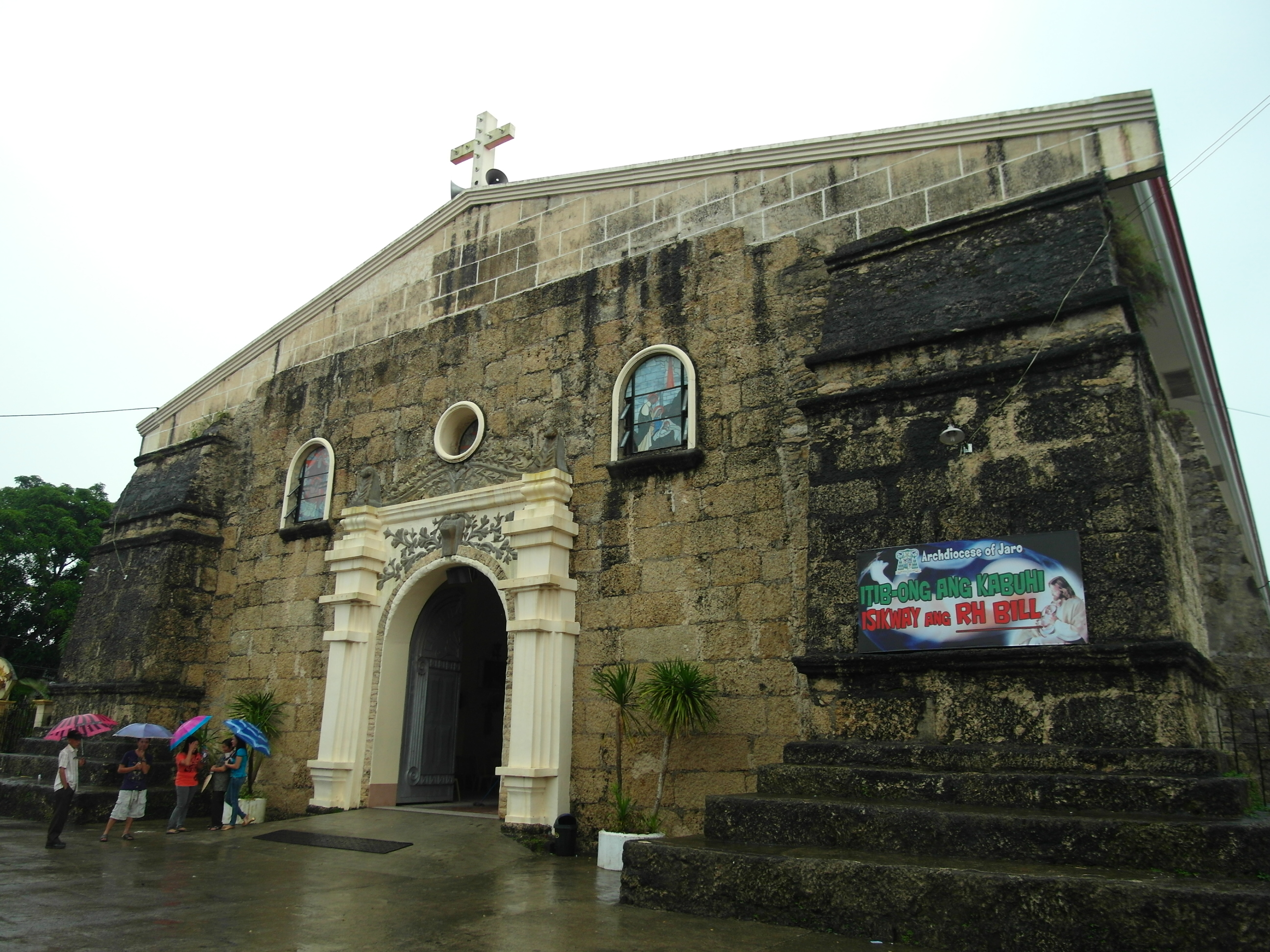
- (From top, left to right): Downtown area, Jalaur River, Passi Church

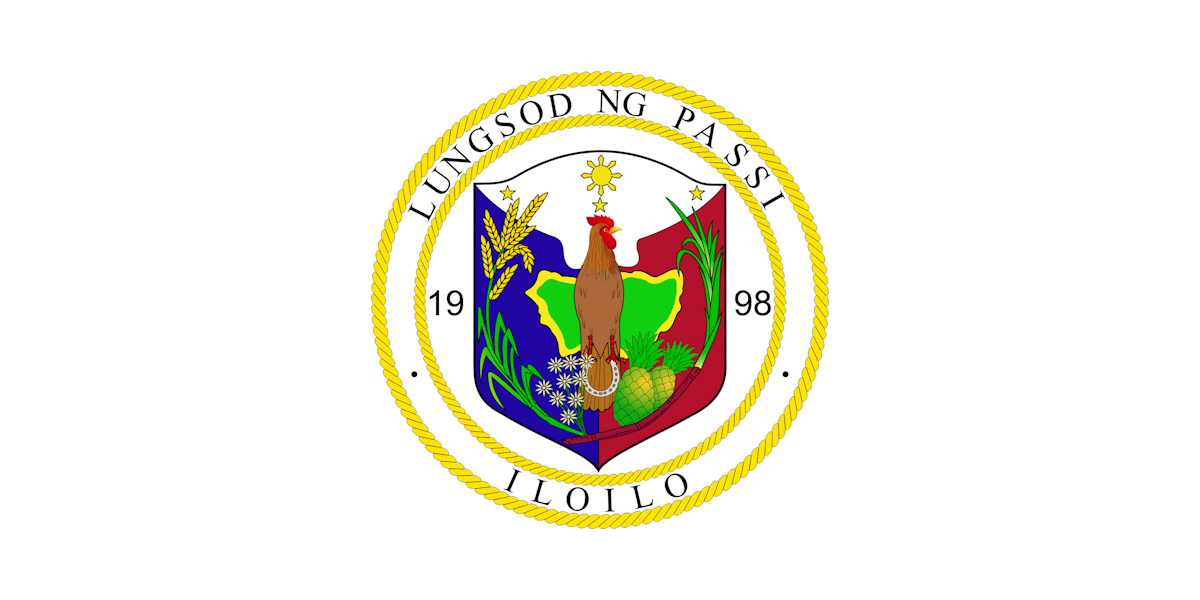
- Flag Seal
- Nickname: "The Sweet City at The Heart of Panay"
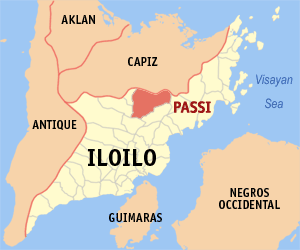
- Map of Iloilo with Passi highlighted
- Interactive map of Passi
- Location within the Philippines
- Coordinates: 11°06′N 122°38′E
- Country: Philippines
- Region: Western Visayas
- Province: Iloilo
- District: 4th district
- Founded: 1766
- Cityhood: March 14, 1999
- Barangays: 51 (see Barangays)

Government
  - Type: Sangguniang Panlungsod
  - Mayor: Stephen A. Palmares (Nacionalista)
  - Vice Mayor: Elyzer C. Chavez (Lakas)
  - Representative: Ferjenel G. Biron (Nacionalista)
  - City Council: Members: Katherine D. Palmares (Lakas); Mario A. Hidalgo, III (Lakas); Bonifacio P. Barbero (Nacionalista); Paul Girard A. Panes (Nacionalista); Jovi A. Palmares (Lakas); Renz Carlo P. Palma (Nacionalista); Cenonito S. Pama (Nacionalista); Joe Divin M. Palencia (Nacionalista); Ramon Andrei P. Pantin (Nacionalista); Pedro P. Sumagpao, Jr. (Ind); Aljoy Payas ^{‡}; Jan Brix Palmares ^{◌}; ‡ ex officio ABC president; ◌ ex officio SK chairman
  - Electorate: 58,623 voters (2025)

Area
  - Total: 251.39 km^{2} (97.06 sq mi)
- Elevation: 82 m (269 ft)
- Highest elevation: 580 m (1,900 ft)
- Lowest elevation: 0 m (0 ft)

Population (2024 census)
  - Total: 90,313
  - Density: 359.25/km^{2} (930.46/sq mi)
  - Households: 21,671
- Demonym: Passinhon

Economy
  - Income class: 3rd city income class
  - Poverty incidence: 17.76% (2023)
  - Revenue: ₱ 1,042 million (2024)
  - Assets: ₱ 2,827 million (2024)
  - Expenditure: ₱ 1,000 million (2024)

Service provider
  - Electricity: Iloilo 2 Electric Cooperative (ILECO 2)
- Time zone: UTC+8 (PST)
- ZIP code: 5037
- PSGC: 063035000
- IDD : area code: +63 (0)33
- Native languages: Karay-a; Hiligaynon; Capisnon; Ati; Tagalog
- Website: www.passicity.gov.ph

Passi, officially known as the City of Passi (Kinaray-a: Syudad kang Passi/Syudad ka Passi; Hiligaynon: Dakbanwa sang Passi; Filipino: Lungsod ng Passi), is a component city in the province of Iloilo, Philippines. According to the 2024 census, it has a population of 90,313 people.

Passi is the only component city in the province of Iloilo, and ranks as the largest in terms of land area and income, and second only to Oton in population size.

== History ==
Passi was a settlement founded by the three Malayan brothers named Dig- on, Tokiab and Umawang at the beginning of its history. This settlement (purok) was well protected from possible attack from adjacent purok.

Passi was discovered and established as a mission parish by Spanish explorers in 1584 under the patronage of St. William of Maleval. In 1593, Padre Juan Villamayor, an Augustinian friar, became its first resident priest. Initially, the mission church was constructed using lightweight materials near the Jalaur River's riverbank. However, in 1600, it was relocated to its current site and rebuilt using stones, slabs, and lime for its foundation and walls. Parishioners contributed by transporting necessary materials to the construction site during their visits to the church. Construction was completed during Padre Pedro Ceberio's tenure, with Salvador “Badong” Panes Perfecto serving as the town's Captain at the time.

Passi holds historical significance as one of the oldest Spanish settlements in Iloilo. Established as a pueblo (community settlement of natives) in 1766, it appointed Don Martin Saligumba as its inaugural gobernadorcillo.

In 1957, the sitio of Agtabo within Passi was officially recognized as a barrio, formerly part of the barrio (district) of Salngan. In the same year, the barrio of Santa Rosa was officially renamed Santo Tomas.

Passi experienced significant development during this period, becoming a center for trade and commerce due to its strategic location. This growth attracted more investment to the municipality, resulting in increased income, population, and territorial expansion. As a result, Passi was recognized as the first component city in the island of Panay. On January 30, 1998, President Fidel V. Ramos signed R.A. 8469, officially converting Passi into a city.

=== Etymology ===
According to popular legend, Spanish conquistadors stumbled on a small hut by the river's bank where an old woman was found winnowing pounded rice. One of them asked her, “¿Cómo se llama este lugar?” not speaking the native language. Misinterpreting the question, the woman responded with "Ah, pasi," which in her language meant "rice", assuming they were asking about the contents of her basket. An alternative interpretation is that "pasi" was a local Malay dialect from the word 'putih' which means "white" - possibly referring to the encounter with the Spaniards themselves. Following this encounter, the Spanish settlers adopted the name Pasi for the location, which eventually transformed into the present-day name of Passi.

== Geography ==
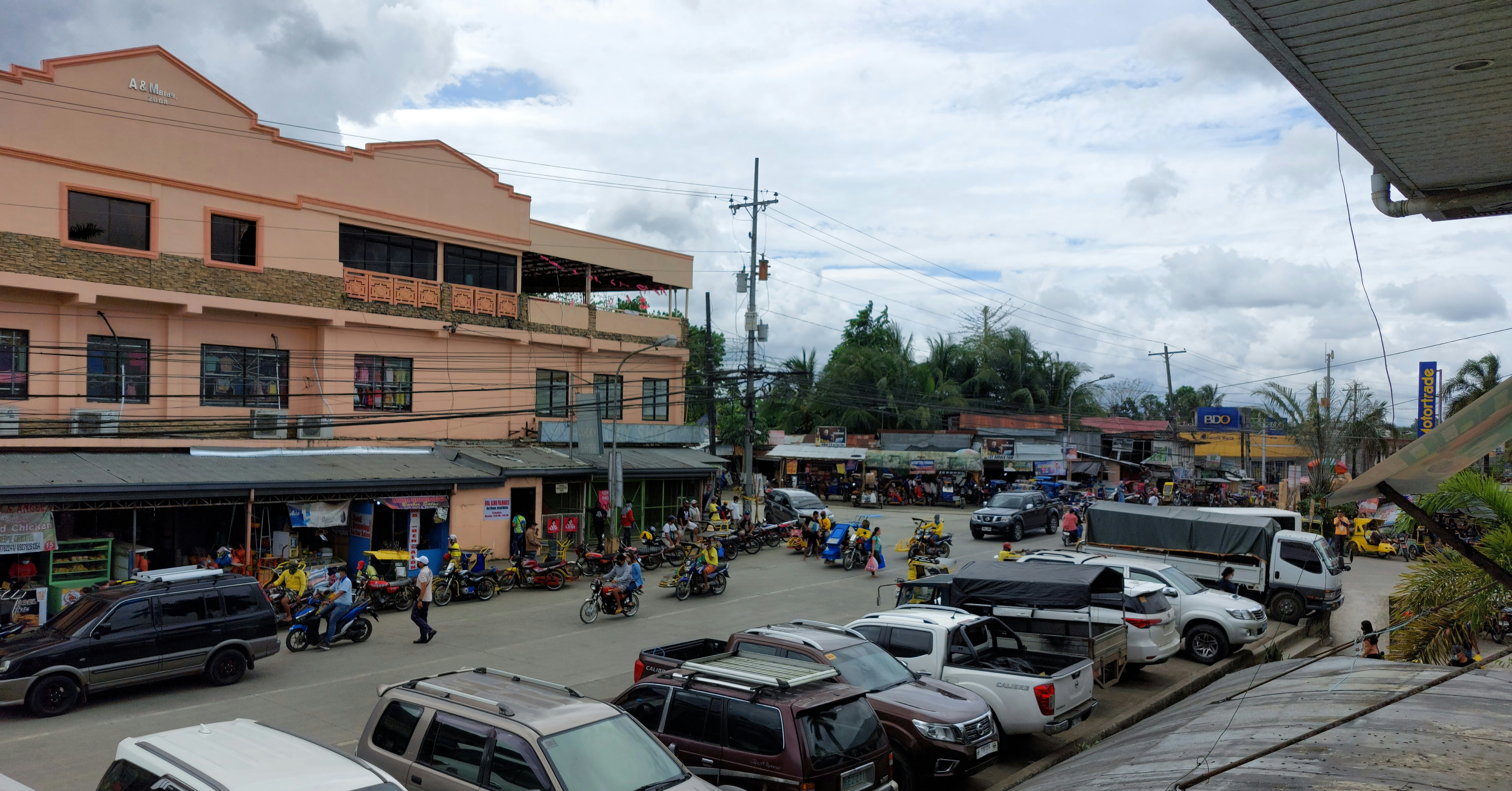
Downtown Passi City, 2022

Passi is located in the central region of Panay along the New Iloilo-Capiz Highway. It is 50 kilometres (31 mi) from Iloilo City and 66 kilometres (41 mi) from Roxas City.

Passi shares borders with Dumarao to the north, San Rafael to the east, San Enrique to the southeast, Dueñas to the south, Calinog to the west, and Bingawan to the northwest.

Passi covers a total land area of 25,139 hectares (62,120 acres), comprising 5.39% of the provincial land area of Iloilo. Its terrain is predominantly flat, extending along the Jalaur and Lamunan Rivers, with mountainous regions situated in the northern part of the city.

=== Climate ===
Climate data for Passi
Month	Jan	Feb	Mar	Apr	May	Jun	Jul	Aug	Sep	Oct	Nov	Dec	Year
Mean daily maximum °C (°F)	28 (82)	29 (84)	30 (86)	32 (90)	32 (90)	30 (86)	29 (84)	29 (84)	29 (84)	29 (84)	29 (84)	28 (82)	30 (85)
Mean daily minimum °C (°F)	23 (73)	22 (72)	23 (73)	23 (73)	25 (77)	25 (77)	24 (75)	24 (75)	24 (75)	24 (75)	23 (73)	23 (73)	24 (74)
Average precipitation mm (inches)	57 (2.2)	37 (1.5)	41 (1.6)	42 (1.7)	98 (3.9)	155 (6.1)	187 (7.4)	162 (6.4)	179 (7.0)	188 (7.4)	114 (4.5)	78 (3.1)	1,338 (52.8)
Average rainy days	12.0	7.7	9.2	10.2	19.5	24.6	26.9	25.1	25.5	25.2	18.0	13.0	216.9
Source: Meteoblue

Passi, akin to many inland areas in Iloilo, lacks a distinct rainy season or pronounced maximum rainfall period. While it does encounter typhoons occasionally, they are not prevalent phenomena in the region.

=== Rivers and mountains ===
The city is intersected by five significant rivers: the Jalaur, Lamunan, Hin-ayan, Asisig, and Maliao. Geographically, Passi is characterized by rolling hills and narrow valley plains. It is flanked by Mount Cañapasan and Mount Bayoso.

=== Barangays ===
Passi is divided into 51 barangays, each comprising puroks, with some containing sitios. Characterized by predominantly mountainous terrain, it is administratively divided into 51 barangays. Passi encompasses a land area of 25,139 hectares or 251.39 square kilometers, making it the largest city in the province in terms of land area.

Passi comprises 11 urban barangays and 38 rural barangays, with 2 located within the city proper barangays. These are organized into 4 geographical districts.

Barangays Poblacion Ilawod and Ilaya are among the most urbanized areas in Passi, constituting its city proper. The downtown area is predominantly located within Poblacion Ilawod. Dorillo Street acts as the dividing line between the two barangays, with Poblacion Ilaya occupying the western portion and Poblacion Ilawod occupying the eastern part. Historically, Barangay Poblacion Ilawod served as the political hub of Passi when it was still a municipality. However, upon Passi's cityhood proclamation in 1998, the new city hall and government center were relocated to Barangay Sablogon.

Passi is part of the 4th District of Iloilo.

Below are the population figures for each barangay as recorded in the 2010 census.

- Agdahon - 1,466
- Agdayao - 1,284
- Aglalana - 3,335
- Agtabo - 1,721
- Agtambo - 1,174
- Alimono - 2,738
- Arac - 1,429
- Ayuyan - 634
- Bacuranan - 1,101
- Bagacay - 863
- Batu - 1,328
- Bayan - 687
- Bitaogan - 2,051
- Buenavista - 530
- Buyo - 761
- Cabunga - 1,246
- Cadilang - 929
- Cairojan - 1,210
- Dalicanan - 2,039
- Gemat-y - 1,055
- Gemumua-Agahon - 3,711
- Gegacjac - 526
- Gines Viejo - 1,945
- Imbang Grande - 2,227
- Jaguimitan - 2,653
- Libo-o - 684
- Maasin - 806
- Magdungao - 2,248
- Malag-it Grande - 701
- Malag-it Pequeño - 276
- Mambiranan Grande - 576
- Mambiranan Pequeño - 580
- Man-it - 4,295
- Mantulang - 515
- Mulapula - 1,458
- Nueva Union - 2,265
- Pangi - 767
- Pagaypay - 567
- Poblacion Ilawod - 6,559
- Poblacion Ilaya - 3,473
- Punong - 374
- Quinagaringan Grande - 1,187
- Quinagaringan Pequeño - 1,011
- Sablogon - 1,849
- Salngan - 2,826
- Santo Tomas - 2,061
- Sarapan - 1,048
- Tagubong - 2,048
- Talongonan - 1,440
- Tubod - 862
- Tuburan - 544

== Demographics ==
Population census of Passi
Year	Pop.	±% p.a.
1903	7,578	—
1918	26,988	+8.84%
1939	28,060	+0.19%
1948	30,918	+1.08%
1960	26,945	−1.14%
1970	35,288	+2.73%
1975	43,755	+4.41%
1980	47,988	+1.86%
1990	57,701	+1.86%
1995	59,539	+0.59%
2000	69,601	+3.40%
2007	76,045	+1.23%
2010	79,663	+1.71%
2015	80,544	+0.21%
2020	88,873	+2.09%
2024	90,313	+0.39%
Source: Philippine Statistics Authority

=== Languages ===
Residents of Passi are commonly referred to as Passinhons. The predominant language spoken in Passi and its surrounding areas is Kinaray-a. Additionally, residents are proficient in Hiligaynon. Capiznon, Tagalog, and English are spoken as secondary languages in the city.

=== Religion ===
The majority of Passinhon people adhere to Roman Catholicism. Protestant denominations, including the Philippine Independent Church or Aglipayan Church, as well as Baptist, Presbyterian, Methodist, Adventist, and Evangelical Christian churches, are also practiced. Additionally, other Christian sects present in Passi City include the Iglesia ni Cristo, Church of Christ (Latter Day Saints), and Jehovah's Witnesses.

== Economy ==
Poverty incidence of Passi (%)

Source: Philippine Statistics Authority

=== Agriculture ===
Passi has historically served as a significant hub for agricultural and industrial activities, particularly as the District Agri-Industrial Center of Iloilo. Its strategic location in the province has contributed to its importance, boasting three sugar centrals and abundant agricultural resources. The city's economy relies heavily on agriculture, with a diverse range of crops including rice, corn, vegetables, coconut, sugarcane, and pineapple. Notably, Passi has been a major pineapple producer for years and has also been recognized for its involvement in other industries such as fruit processing, wallboard production, metalworking, and cut-flower propagation. Locally made products like pineapple wine, jam, and fruit preserves have gained recognition through participation in various trade fairs and exhibitions, including the annual Fiesta in the City celebration in May, Tumandok in September, and Wow Philippines: the Best of the Region.

Passi possesses favorable physical resources, including fertile soil along rolling hills and narrow valley plains, abundant surface and groundwater, and a climate without distinct dry and wet seasons. These conditions are conducive to cultivating various agricultural products such as rice, sugarcane, and pineapple. In response to fluctuations in the sugar industry, local farmers have diversified into other crops such as corn, pineapple, mongo, root crops, and other farm-based products. The city also presents investment opportunities for agri-industrial developments.

Industrial development is a key focus area for the local government, given Passi's designation as one of the five Agro-Industrial districts in the province. It serves as the site for the People's Industrial Enterprise (PIE's) District Agro-Industrial Center (DAIC) in the 4th District. The PIE's / DAIC's play a crucial role in providing intermediate processing of locally sourced raw materials for final processing at the DAIC. Additionally, they facilitate the manufacturing of finished goods, leveraging cooperative advantages to make manufacturing activities economically viable.

=== Banking ===
Passi serves as a significant trade and business hub outside Metro Iloilo.

=== Retail ===
As a component city of Iloilo Province, Passi serves as a significant shopping destination outside the provincial capital.

Gaisano Capital Passi is the first shopping mall established in Passi. It features a selection of stores including grocery and department stores, as well as leased spaces for other businesses.

CityMall (Philippines) Commercial Centers Inc. operates in Passi situated at the front of Passi City Bus Terminal along the Iloilo-Capiz New Route.

=== Power and energy ===
Power distribution in Passi and neighboring towns, including Dueñas, San Enrique, and Calinog, is managed by Iloilo Electric Cooperative II (ILECO II).

In August 2022, MORE Power, a power distributor serving Iloilo City, received official approval to extend its services to Passi and 16 other municipalities in the province.

=== Water supply ===
Water distribution in Passi and neighboring barangays is facilitated by Balibago Waterworks System Inc drawing water from the aquifer of Barangays Bacuranan and Sablogon.

=== Communications ===
Passi is serviced by three telephone service providers, namely the Philippine Long Distance Telephone Company (PLDT), Globe Telecom, and Panay Telephone Corporation (PANTELCO). Passi is served by two cellular companies, namely Smart Communications and Globe Telecom, providing cellular telephone facilities to residents and businesses in the area.

=== Television stations ===
Kalibo Cable TV Inc. (formerly Milkyway Cablevision Services, Inc. or MCSI) provides local cable TV services to Passi, San Enrique, Dueñas, and Dingle. It offers 74 national and international television channels, along with one local channel (Kalibo Cable) featuring local programming and talk shows. One of its notable programs is Talking Point, where individuals or organizations are interviewed on topics relevant to Passi City. This program is also broadcast live on Facebook via the page 'Good Morning Passi'.

=== Print media ===
The Passinhon Times serves as the official publication of Passi.

== Culture ==
Attractions in Passi encompass a variety of sites, including extensive pineapple plantations, cock farms, the Baroque Church of Saint William the Hermit, the historic Muscovado Chimney, the Chameleon Butterfly Garden, the Amorotic caves of Barangay Magdungao, scenic highway vistas offering captivating sunset views, and the aging Railway Bridge spanning the Jalaur River.

=== Pintados de Pasi ===
The Pintados de Pasi Festival was inaugurated in March 1998 to commemorate Passi's cityhood.

=== Christmas events ===
The city hosts Christmas events annually from the middle of December until the first Sunday of January at Plaza Paloma.

=== Kapistahan ===
Passi celebrates the feast of its patron saint, San Guillermo de Ermita (St. William the Hermit), on February 10, accompanied by the coronation of the fiesta queen.

== Landmarks and notable places ==
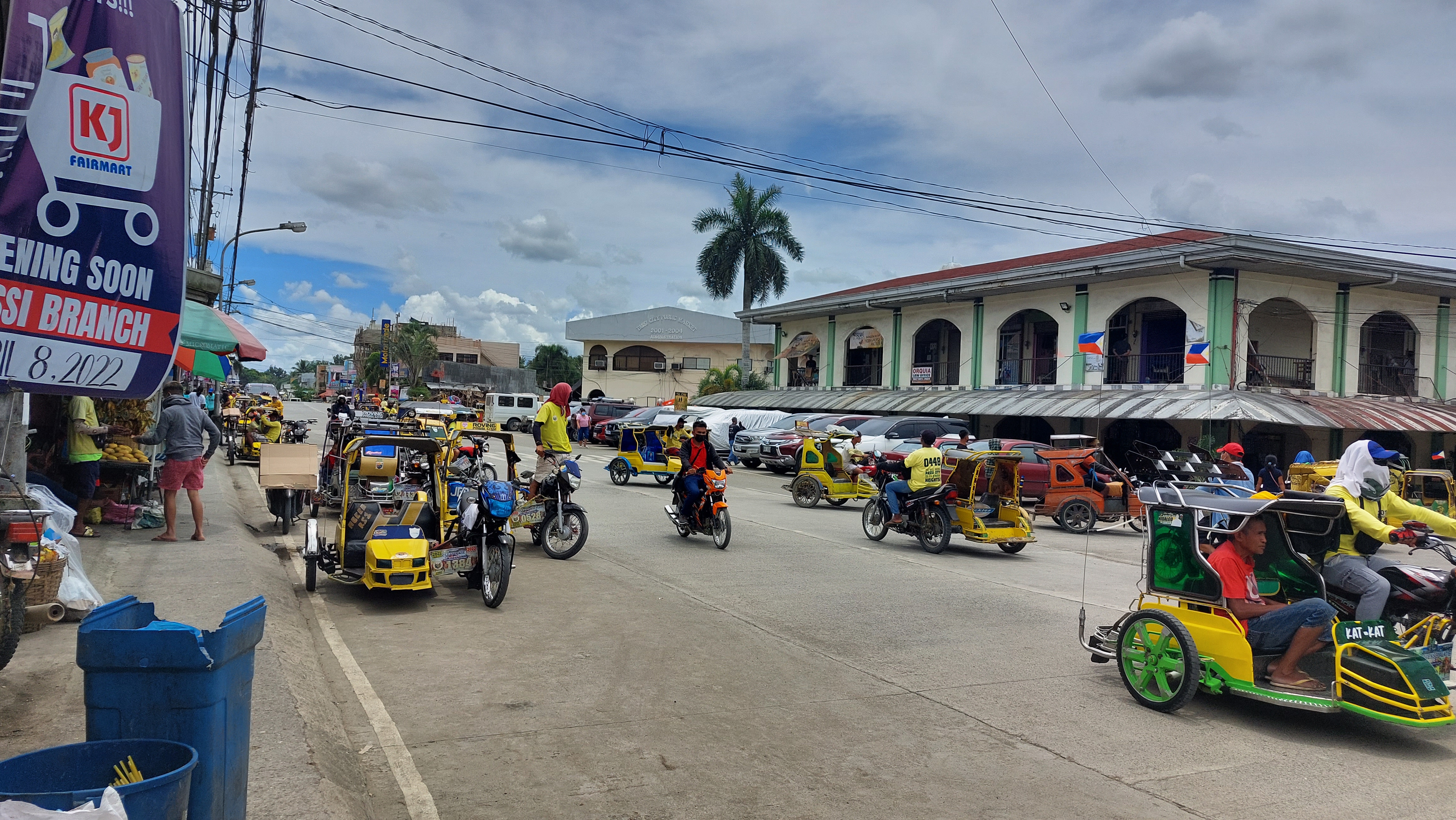
Passi City Public Market

Passi has several landmarks that reflect its rich history and culture. The city is home to mountain ranges and a network of caves including the 'Labjay' Cave, 'Cabugon', 'Tinay' and 'Bitas' Caves, the 'Agcararao' Cave, the 'Kwembani Wening of Wening's' Cave and the 'Baboy-Baboy' and Amorotik' Caves.

=== St. William the Hermit of Maleval Parish Church ===
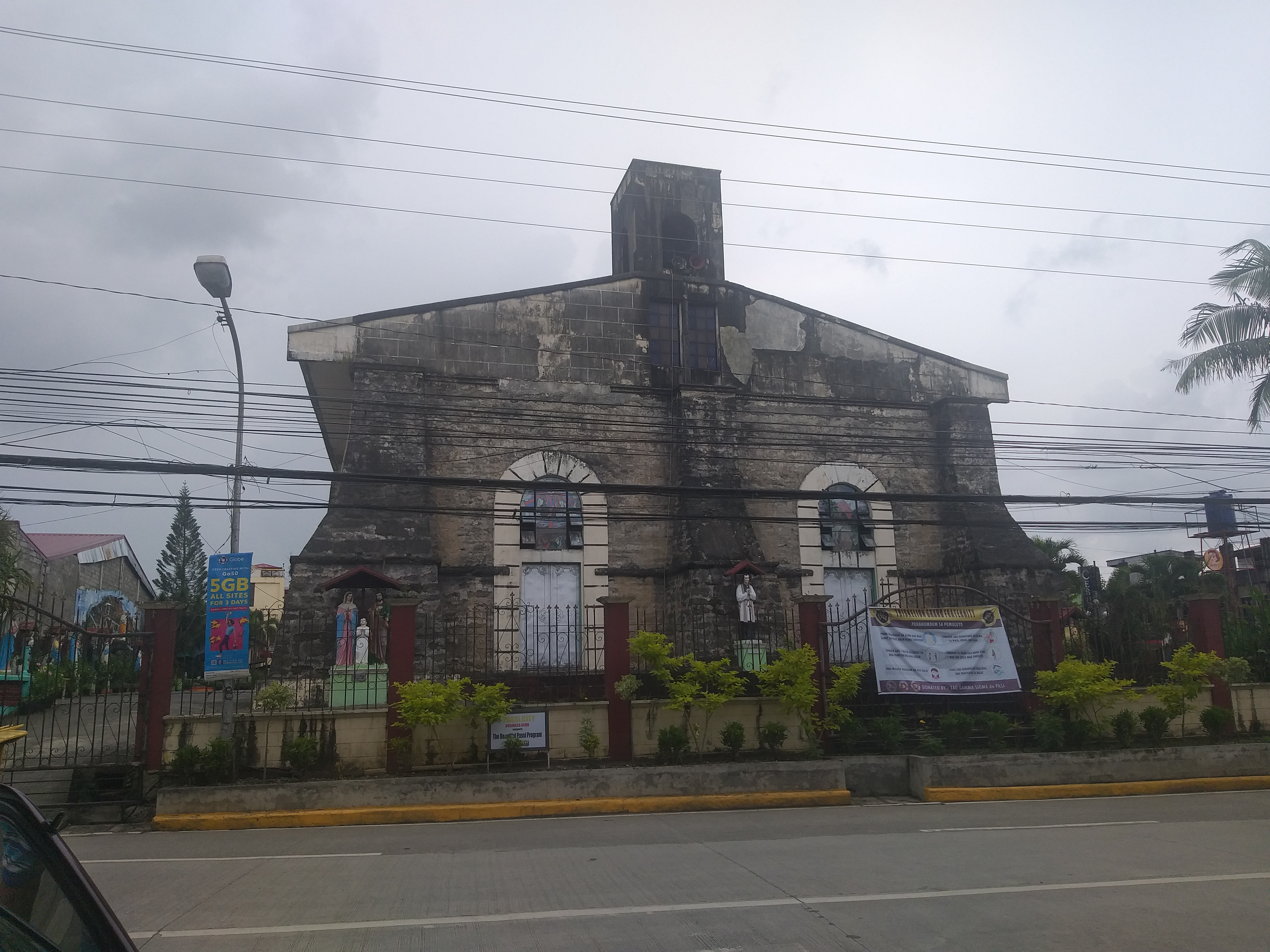
Façade of Passi Church

The church is notable for its militaristic architecture, characterized by massive buttresses supporting the front and back walls, reflecting its design as a 'fortress church'. It was constructed to replace previous churches demolished by an earthquake in 1612 and subsequent fires. In 1856, Friar Pedro Ceberio undertook the restoration of the church, which had deteriorated over time. The current structure is the outcome of his restoration efforts.

Typical of churches from this era, one can observe the Augustinian seal on the archway over one of the side entrances, suggesting their involvement in its construction. Historical records are ambiguous regarding the placement of entrances, leading historians to speculate about the location of the original main entrance. Some evidence suggests that it could have been the doorway on the southeast corner of the church, leading to the 'Garden of Saints'. The church remained intact through the Revolution and the Philippines American War, but in 1932, it suffered damage when its roof was blown away by a typhoon.

The church is encircled by a 'Garden of the Saints,' adorned with 25 to 30 statues of saints, which were contributed by parishioners over time. Inside the church's lofty belfry are three bells, two of considerable size and one smaller. To ring the larger bell, a chain connected to the clapper is stepped on to strike the sound rim, with the intensity of the step determining the volume of the sound. The other two bells are rung manually by striking their clappers against the sound rim, requiring the bell ringer to be in close proximity to the bells during ringing.

=== Other notable places ===
- F. Palmares Sr. Street, also referred to as the "Calle Real" of Passi, has historically been the bustling commercial center of the city. Originally part of the national highway leading to the provinces of Capiz or Aklan, it now serves as an alternative route to Iloilo Airport.
- The New City Hall of Passi City, initially constructed in 1995 as a municipal hall, underwent a redesign in 1998 to serve as the City Hall. It is situated at the corner of Monfort Avenue and Casamayor Street.
- The Old Municipal Hall, constructed in 1930, stands as one of the few remaining Pre-war structures in Passi. It currently accommodates various offices, including the Department of Agrarian Reform (DAR), Commission on Elections (COMELEC), Post Office, and Conference Hall. Colloquially, it is referred to as "Residencia Passi."
- The St. William of Maleval Parish Church Convent, recognized as the largest and tallest parish convent within the Archdiocese, it features two reception halls—Jubilee Hall and Lamunan Hall
- Plaza Paloma, situated opposite the old municipal hall, and recognizable by a distinctive large pineapple-shaped restroom. The park offers a multipurpose sporting court where visitors engage in various recreational activities.
- Paseo de Passi, located a short distance from Plaza Paloma used as a local meeting point
- The Passi City Public Market stands as the largest market in Iloilo Province
- The Old Jalaur Railway Bridge, also referred to as the Watanabe Terror Bridge, is among the few remaining railroad bridges in Panay. It stands as a significant landmark in Passi, warranting further preservation efforts
- The Muscovado Chimney at Passi Sugar Central stands as the largest and tallest chimney on Panay Island.

== Healthcare ==
Passi City hosts the district hospital managed by the provincial government. In 2016 it was announced the hospital would increase its capacity from 25 to 50 beds subject to the hospitals being able to attract additional nursing staff. In 2020, the hospital was included in a Panay wide allocation of 200 COVID beds across 12 district hospitals. In 2023 it was announced the hospital was allotted P13.740m from the national government for the upgrading and improvement of its services.

=== Philippine Red Cross ===
Passi serves as the Regional Operations Center of the Philippine Red Cross since 2017.

== Sports ==
A P80-million sports complex officially broke ground at Passi City College in 2024, marking a significant development for the city's educational infrastructure. The complex will feature a rubberized oval, an improved grandstand, perimeter fencing, and provisions for a future Olympic-sized swimming pool.

The Passi City Gymnasium, inaugurated in May 2018, has hosted exhibition games featuring teams from UAAP and PBA.

Passi City Center Fitness and Wellness, situated in Barangay Sablogon, serves as a gym and fitness center. Additionally, it hosts cockfighting events.

Annually since 2014, the 'Mayor Jesry T Palmares Summer Olympics' takes place during the summer season. The event features various sports including basketball, volleyball, table tennis, lawn tennis, badminton, taekwondo, soccer, chess, and fun run.

Passi City is the home location of the Iloilo United Royals, a professional basketball team. The team competes in the Maharlika Pilipinas Basketball League (MPBL) since the 2019–20 season, using the Passi City Arena as its home venue.

== Education ==
=== College ===
Passi City College - courses offered

Bachelor in Elementary Education(BEED)
Bachelor in Secondary Education(BSED)
Bachelor of Science in Information Technology(BSIT)
Bachelor of Science in Business Administration(BSBA)
Bachelor of Science in Criminology(BSCRIM)
Bachelor of Science in Hotel and Restaurant Management(BSHRM)

=== Diploma ===
Passi Trade School (Tesda)

Courses	Nos of Hours
Automotive Servicing NC II	660
Bread and Pastry Production NCI	141
Bread and Pastry Production NCII	692
Consumer Electronic Servicing NCII	558
Electrical Installation and Maintenance NCII	502
Shielded Metal Arc Welding (SMAW) NCI	268
Shielded Metal Arc Welding (SMAW) NCII	304

== Transportation infrastructure ==
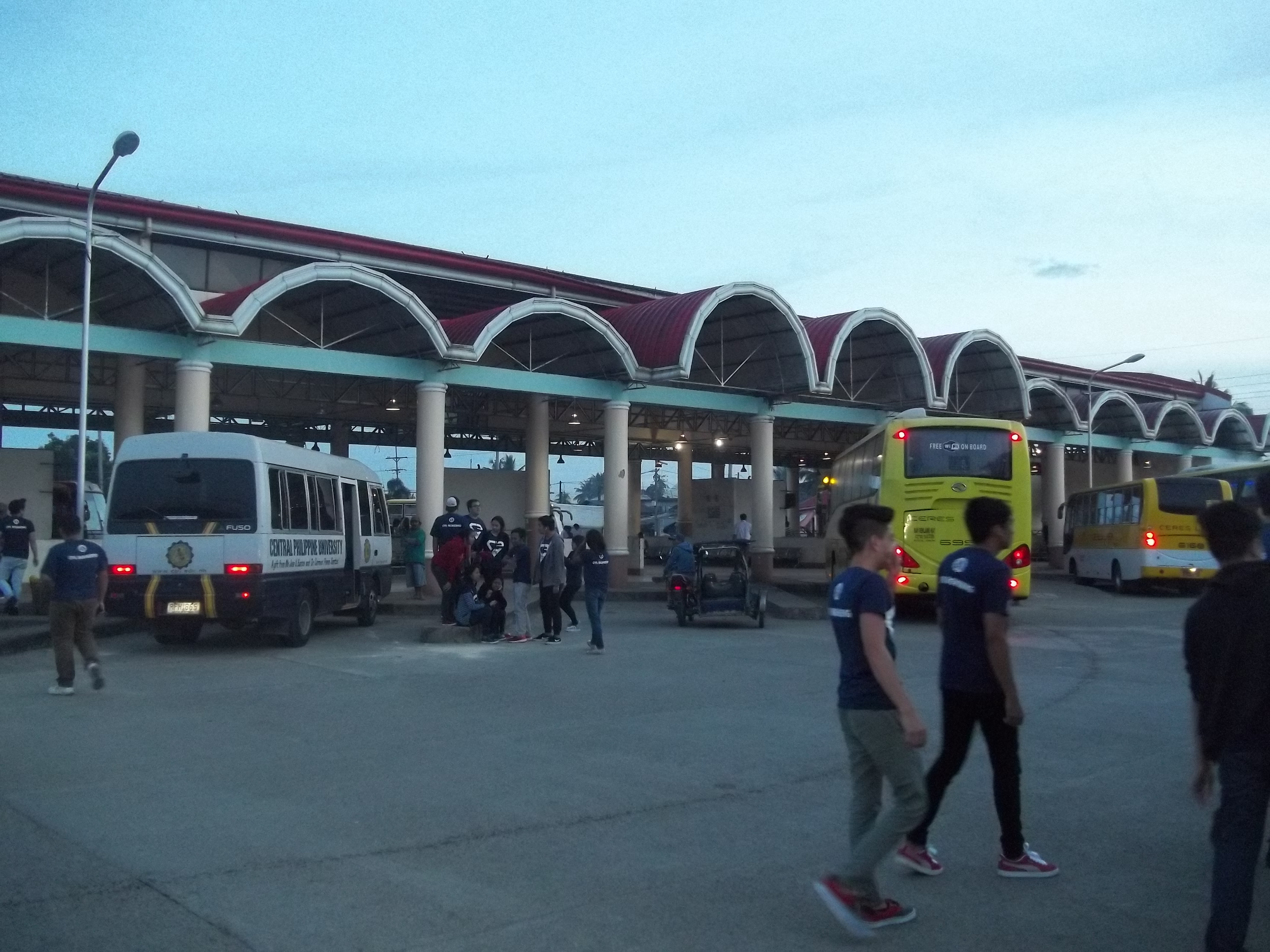
Passi Bus Terminal

Passi City is accessible by bus, with options available for those traveling from Iloilo City. Additionally, tricycles and jeepneys serve as the primary modes of transportation within Passi.

== Notable personalities ==
- Aby Marano - volleyball player

== Sister cities ==
- Jining, China
