= Jalaur River =

River in Iloilo, Philippines

Jalaur River Jalaud River
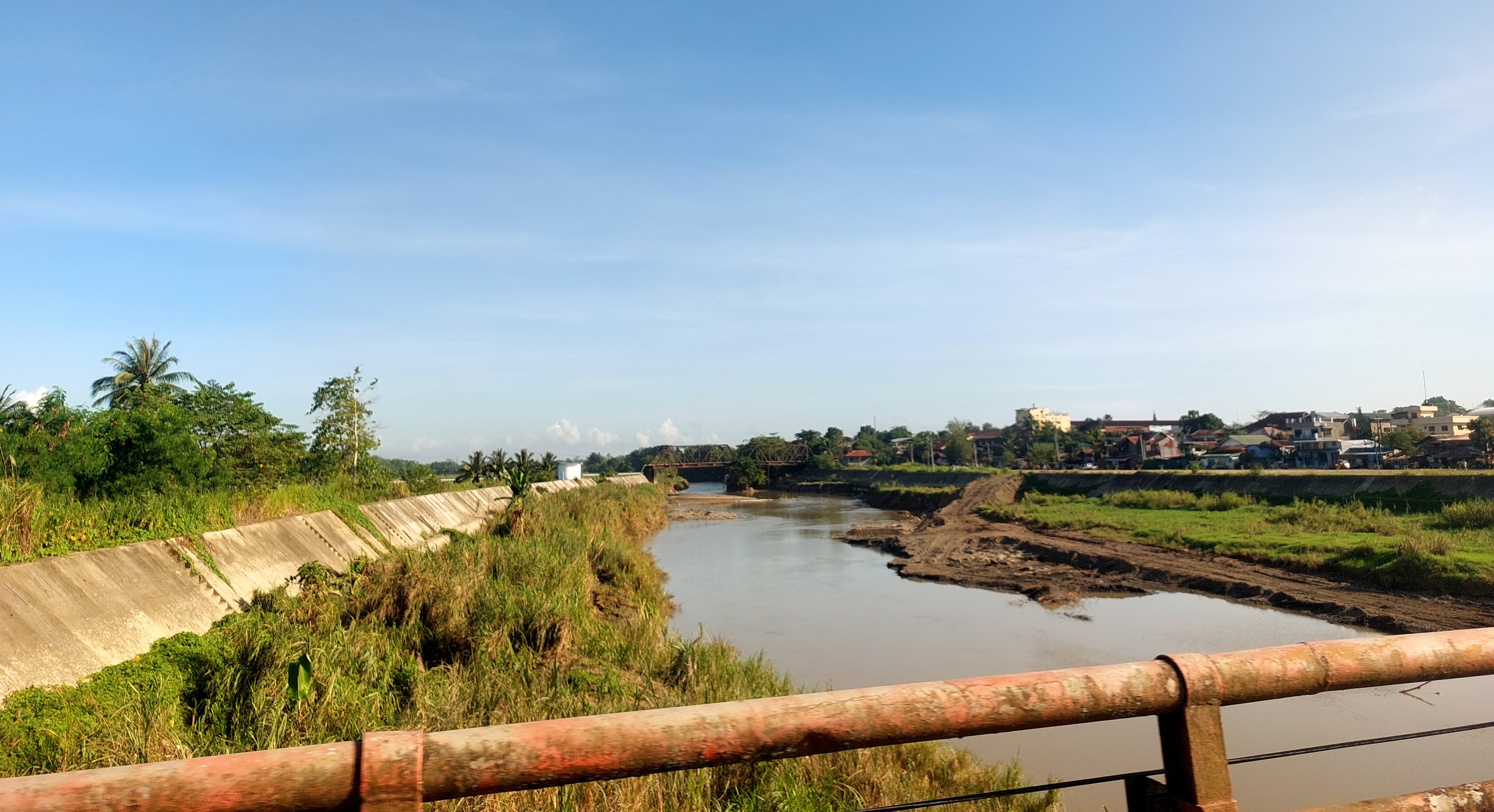
- Jalaur River in Passi, Iloilo

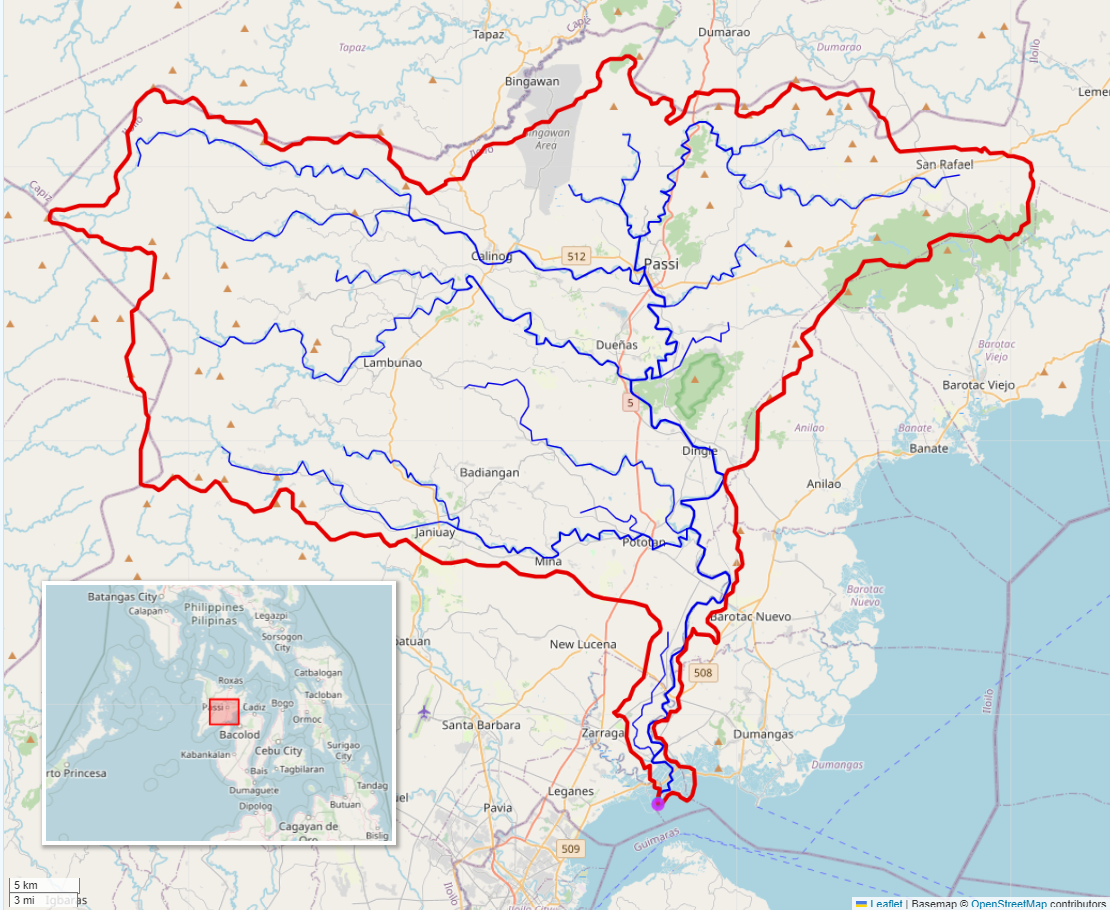
- Jalaur River basin map

- Location within Visayas Location within Philippines

Location
- Country: Philippines
- Region: Western Visayas
- Province: Iloilo
- City/municipality: Passi; Leganes; Zarraga; Dumangas; Barotac Nuevo; Pototan; Dingle; San Enrique; Dueñas; Calinog

Physical characteristics
- Source: Central Panay Mountain Range
  - location: Calinog, Iloilo
- Mouth: Guimaras Strait
  - location: Leganes, Iloilo
  - coordinates: 10°46′24″N 122°38′38″E
  - elevation: 0 m (0 ft)
- Length: 123 km (76 mi)
- Basin size: 1,503 km^{2} (580 sq mi)
- Discharge
  - location: Guimaras Strait
  - average: 40.3 m^{3}/s (1,420 cu ft/s)
  - minimum: 8 m^{3}/s (280 cu ft/s)
  - maximum: 84.5 m^{3}/s (2,980 cu ft/s)

Basin features
- Tributaries
  - left: Lamunan River; Asisig River
  - right: Alawihaw River; Ulian River (Laglag River); Suage River

The Jalaur River, also known as Jalaud River, is the second longest river on Panay island in the Philippines, with a total length of 123 km (76 mi) and the second largest by drainage basin after Panay River in Capiz. The Jalaur has a drainage area of 1,503 square kilometres (580 sq mi). Its source is in the Central Panay Mountain Range, west of Calinog, and the river traverses east to southeast before emptying into the Guimaras Strait. It drains the eastern portion of Panay and courses through Passi City and the towns of Leganes, Zarraga, Dumangas, Barotac Nuevo, Pototan, Dingle, San Enrique, Dueñas, and Calinog, all in Iloilo province.

The river provides irrigation to farmlands as well as providing a source of potable water.

The river is the site of the Jalaur Mega Dam project that begun in 2019.

== Etymology ==
Jalaur, also known by its variant form Jalaud, seems to be a Hispanicized form of Halawod, the river which serves as the core setting of Hinilawod, an epic poem from Panay.

== Geography ==
The Jalaur River has an annual average discharge of 40.3 cubic metres per second (1,420 cu ft/s).

The lower reached of the Jalaur River experiences seasonal flooding. When there is heavy downpour, during the months of June to September, the river overflows and floods the surrounding area. Panay island is also located within the typhoon belt, which experiences several typhoons annually, is also a major factor of flooding of the river.

=== Municipalities/Cities ===
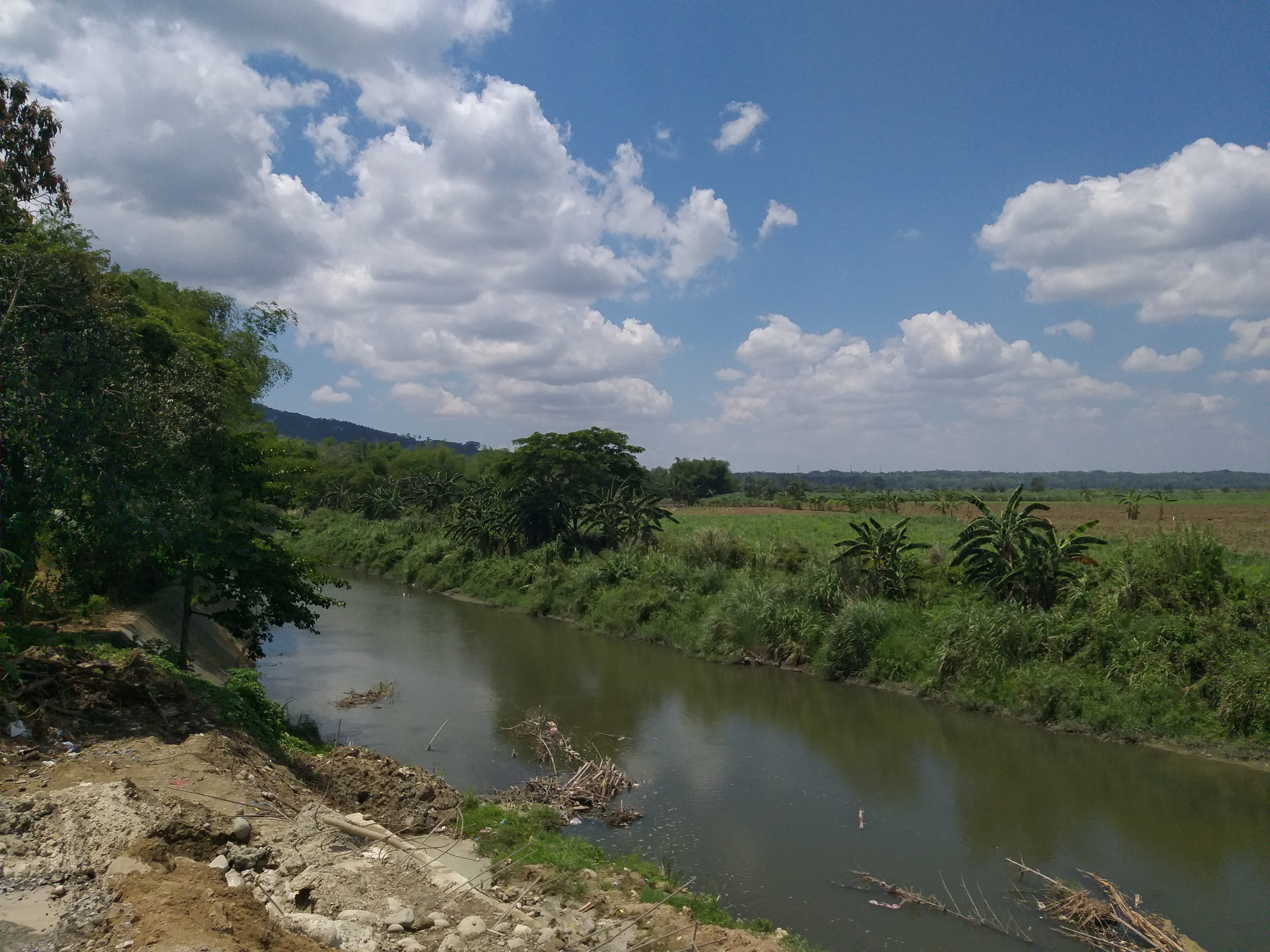
Jalaur river in San Enrique, Iloilo.

The Jalaur River passes through the following city and municipalities:

Cities:

- Passi City

Municipalities:

- Leganes, Iloilo
- Zarraga, Iloilo
- Dumangas, Iloilo
- Barotac Nuevo, Iloilo
- Pototan, Iloilo
- Dingle, Iloilo
- San Enrique, Iloilo
- Dueñas, Iloilo
- Calinog, Iloilo

== Economic importance ==
The Jalaur River is used in irrigating 15,519 hectares (38,350 acres) in the province of Iloilo through the Jalaur River Irrigation System.

The Metro Iloilo Water District, the potable water provider for Iloilo City, sources some of its water requirement from the river.

=== Jalaur River Multipurpose Project II ===
In July 2024, President Bongbong Marcos and Franklin Drilon launched the PHP19 billion Jalaur River Multipurpose Project II in Calinog. As of June 2024, the National Irrigation Administration said the entire project is 75.51% finished and will operate by mid-2025. JRMP II is composed of a 38.5-meter afterbay dam, a 109-meter high dam, a 10-meter river catch dam, and 214-kilometer irrigation canals covering 17 municipalities of Panay.
