= Passi Church =

Roman Catholic church in Iloilo, Philippines

- Saint William the Hermit of Maleval Parish Church
- Parokya ni San Guillermo Ermita ng Maleval (Filipino)
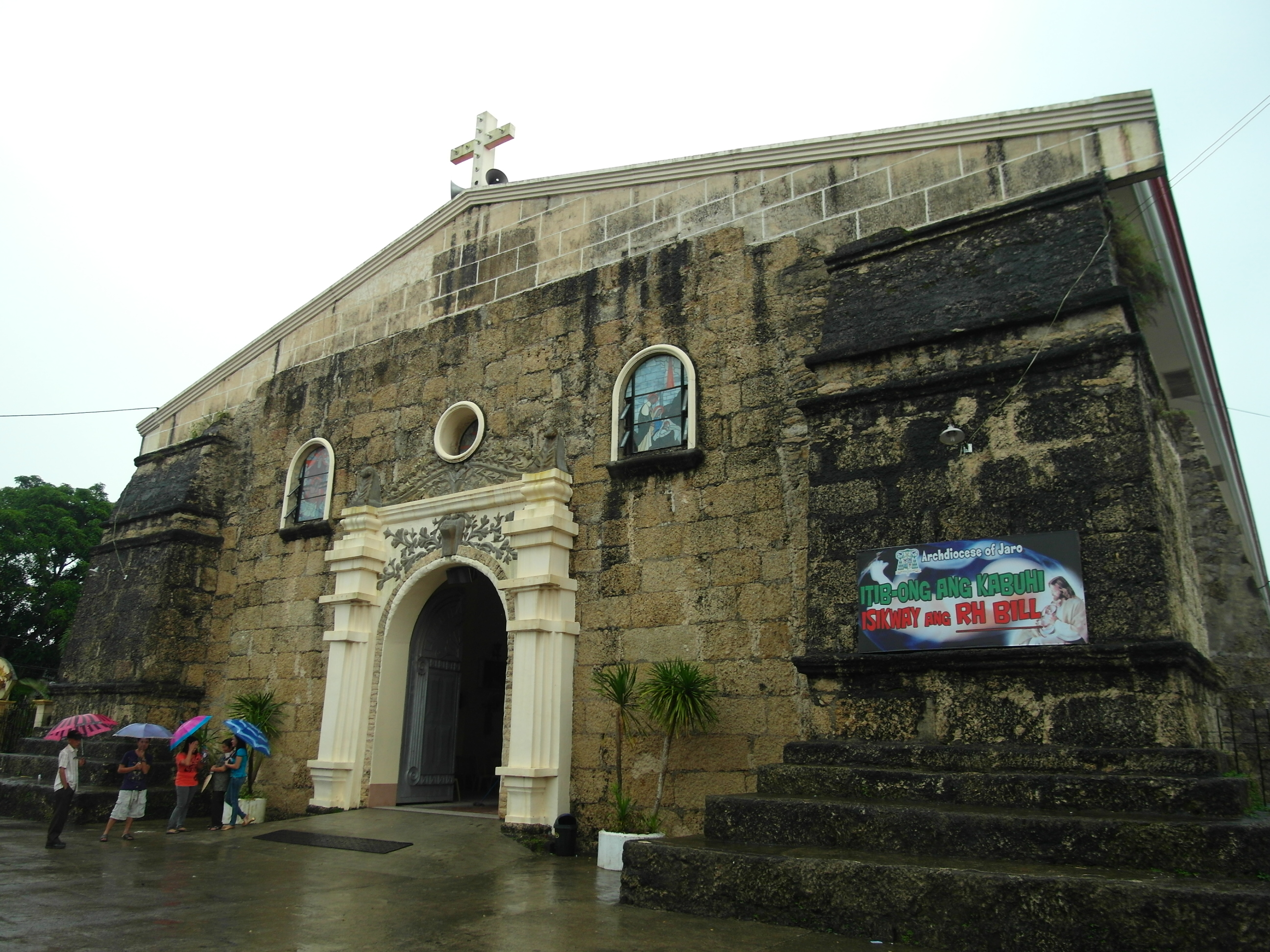
- Church façade in 2011

- Location in the Visayas Location in the Philippines
- 11°06′22″N 122°38′27″E
- Location: Passi, Iloilo
- Country: Philippines
- Denomination: Roman Catholic

History
- Status: Parish church
- Founded: 1812
- Dedication: William of Maleval

Architecture
- Functional status: Active
- Architectural type: Church building
- Style: Baroque Revival
- Completed: 1877

Specifications
- Materials: Limestone

Administration
- Archdiocese: Jaro

Saint William the Hermit of Maleval Parish Church, also known as San Guillermo Parish Church and Passi Church, is Roman Catholic parish church located in Passi in the province of Iloilo, Philippines. It is under the Archdiocese of Jaro.

== History ==
Saint William Church was originally constructed in 1812 as one of 72 different Augustinian churches on Panay Island. The church's original structure was destroyed by a lightning-induced fire in its early years and was later reconstructed to its present form. The church was reconstructed between 1856 and 1877 under the direction of Fr. Pedro Ceberio. The adjoining convent was built by Fr. Crescencio Bravo.

== Architecture ==
The church is built in a Baroque style using limestone, with massive boulders serving as buttresses along the front and nave walls. The facade is simple, with minimal decoration, featuring an arched portal flanked by pilasters and scroll work, as well as arch and round windows. The pediment is topped with a cross, and the apse wall includes arched windows. A bell tower is located at the top of the pediment.

Inside, the church boasts a main retablo, side retablos, and pulpit, all heavily gilded with gold leaf. These rich decorations, along with the centuries-old statues displayed in the retablo niches, reflect the Baroque style. On the gospel side of the church is the Jardin de los Santos, a garden dedicated to saints.
