= West Visayas State University, Calinog =

Public university in Iloilo, Philippines

West Visayas State University
- Other name: Taga-West
- Motto: "Service, Harmony, Excellence"
- Type: State University
- Established: 1902 (system); 1947 (campus)
- President: Pablo E. Subong, Jr.
- Administrator: Rosario Clarabel C. Contreras
- Location: Calinog, Iloilo, Philippines; 11°07′00″N 122°32′24″E
- Campus: Suburban
- Colors: Blue & gold
- Sporting affiliations: SCUAA

- Location in the Visayas Location in the Philippines

West Visayas State University, Calinog is a university in Calinog, Iloilo, Philippines. It is one of the four West Visayas State University's (WVSU) satellite campuses in the Third Congressional District of Iloilo.

== History ==
The West Visayas State University in Calinog started as Calinog High School in 1947 with the help of (then) Provincial Board Member and Mayor of Calinog, Atty. Jose M. Celo and Colonel Julian Chavez, (Congressman of the fourth District of Iloilo). Congressman Ricardo Ladrido sponsored Republic Act No. 2399 converting the Calinog High School to Calinog Agricultural and Industrial School. Its first Vocational School Administrator is Dr. Ernesto V. Botin, who was succeeded by Mr. Daniel Delariarte, Jr. and later by Mr. Ernesto A. Rapista.

Calinog Agricultural and Industrial School was elevated as a tertiary educational institution on July 15, 1977, and was renamed Calinog Agricultural and Industrial College (CAIC) and started to offer a Two-Year Post Secondary Course – AAT (Associate in Agricultural Technology). Batas Pambansa Blg. 879, through the Hon. Assemblyman Narciso Monfort, officially made CAIC as full tertiary education institution (January 1, 1986).

Republic Act No. 7722, an Act creating the Commission on Higher Education approved by President Fidel V. Ramos placed CAIC under the direct supervision of the Commission on Higher Education. CAIC in consortium with Aklan State College of Agriculture started to offer graduate programs (MPA, MAEd and MA Agri. Productivity). In 1997, CHED authorized CAIC to offer additional programs in its academic offerings - BS in Hotel and Restaurant Management, BS in Information Technology, BS in Secondary Education major in English and BS Elementary Education major in English.

Mrs. Corabella S. Castro, Vocational Instruction Supervisor III of the college was designated by CHED as officer-in-Charge from February to November 5, 1999, and on November 6, 1999, she was appointment as Vocational School Superintendent. Under her administration, Science and Math majors were added to the teacher education program and Food Technology was offered as a four-year degree program (ladderized scheme).

With the enactment of the Higher Education Act of 1994 and the Higher Education Modernization Act of 1997, Calinog Agricultural and Industrial College was integrated into the West Visayas State University System and was renamed as the West Visayas State University - Calinog Campus. The memorandum sets the implementing guidelines in the integration of CHED-Supervised Institutions (CSI's) to State Universities and Colleges (SUC's).
