= Calinog =

Municipality in Iloilo, Philippines

- Municipality
- Municipality of Calinog
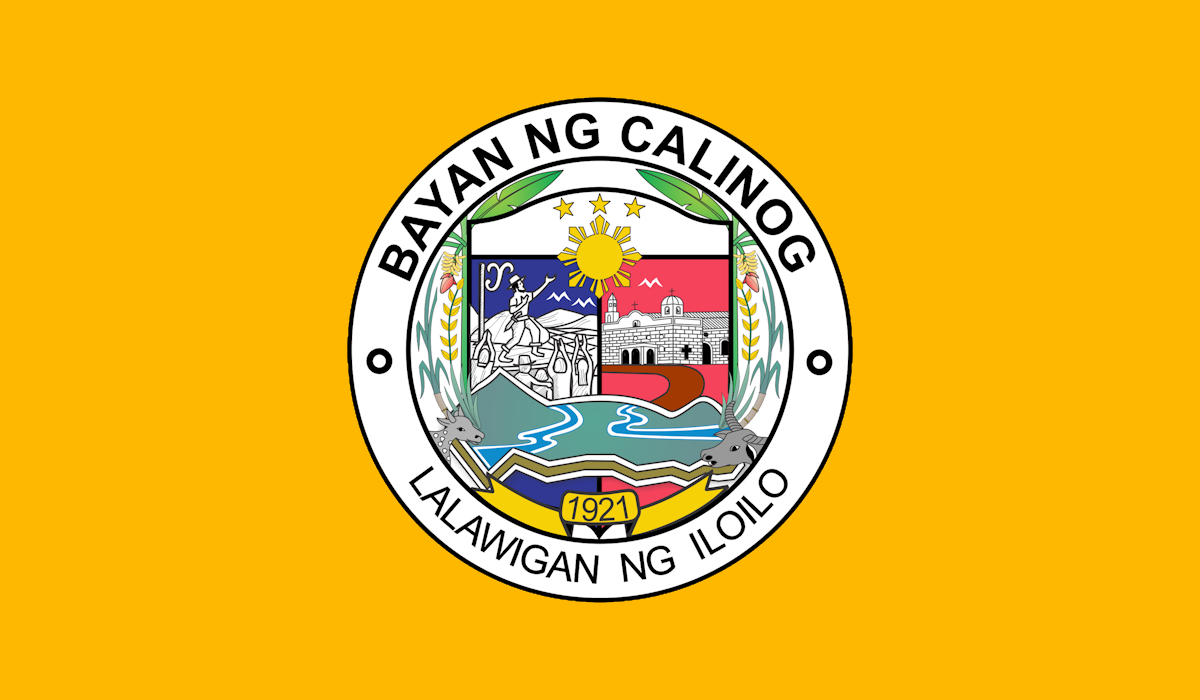
- Flag Seal

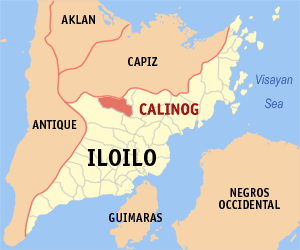
- Map of Iloilo with Calinog highlighted
- Interactive map of Calinog
- Location within the Philippines
- Coordinates: 11°07′21″N 122°32′17″E
- Country: Philippines
- Region: Western Visayas
- Province: Iloilo
- District: 3rd district
- Founded: 1763
- Barangays: 59 (see Barangays)

Government
  - Type: Sangguniang Bayan
  - Mayor: Francisco L. Calvo (PFP)
  - Vice Mayor: Julius Anthony L. Castaños (PFP)
  - Representative: Lorenz R. Defensor (NUP)
  - Municipal Council: Members: Ruel P. Centina (PFP); Anthony Andrew C. Gustilo (PFP); Charles Alex B. Centena (PFP); MC John M. Fernandez (Ind); Renato B. Magpantay (PFP); Mayjan Paul C. Hurtada (PFP); Rayni C. Manejable (PFP); Teodoro Y. Lao, II (Ind); Leo Andy E. Panes ^{‡}; Patrick A. Luceño ^{◌}; ‡ ex officio ABC president; ◌ ex officio SK chairman
  - Electorate: 40,270 voters (2025)

Area
  - Total: 274.55 km^{2} (106.00 sq mi)
- Elevation: 78 m (256 ft)
- Highest elevation: 153 m (502 ft)
- Lowest elevation: 44 m (144 ft)

Population (= 2024)
  - Total: 63,896
  - Density: 232.73/km^{2} (602.77/sq mi)
  - Households: 15,413

Economy
  - Income class: 1st municipal income class
  - Poverty incidence: 21.06% (2023)
  - Revenue: ₱ 310.9 million (2024)
  - Assets: ₱ 998.4 million (2024)
  - Expenditure: ₱ 283.5 million (2024)
  - Liabilities: ₱ 346.6 million (2024)

Service provider
  - Electricity: Iloilo 2 Electric Cooperative (ILECO 2)
- Time zone: UTC+8 (PST)
- ZIP code: 5040
- PSGC: 063013000
- IDD : area code: +63 (0)33
- Native languages: Karay-a; Hiligaynon; Capisnon; Ati; Tagalog

Calinog, officially known as the Municipality of Calinog (Kinaray-a: Banwa kang Calinog, Hiligaynon: Banwa sang Calinog, Tagalog: Bayan ng Calinog [pronounced Bayan nang Kah-lee-nog]), is a municipality in the province of Iloilo, Philippines. According to the 2024 census, it has a population of 63,896 people.

== History ==
Calinog is situated in the central part of Panay Island in the Philippines. By one local account, it was one of the areas where Datu Marikudo, the Ati chieftain, chose to settle after ceding the lowland regions of Panay to the Malay settlers in exchange for gold and other goods. This event, often dated to around the 13th century, is rooted in oral tradition and is referenced in the Maragtas, a semi-legendary account of the early history of Panay.

=== Pre-colonial era ===
The early inhabitants of Calinog are believed to have been members of the indigenous Ati community, led by Datu Marikudo. Following a trade with the Malays, Marikudo and his people gradually retreated inland and eventually settled between the Jalaur and Ulian rivers around the 13th century. According to oral tradition, Marikudo later established his final settlement atop a series of hills that now overlook the present-day poblacion (town center), and are locally referred to as the Marikudo Hills.

After the Ati retreated inland, Malay groups under the direction of Datu Sumakwel, one of the ten Bornean datus, moved into the area. To manage settlement among his people, Sumakwel reportedly delegated territories to his men: Lumakad was given land along the Jalaur River, and Dumara-ug was given the area along the Ulian River. Over time, conflicts arose between their descendants, but were later resolved through intermarriage, reuniting the groups before Spanish arrival.

=== Spanish colonial period ===
The Spanish colonization of Panay began during the latter half of the 16th century. In 1569, Miguel López de Legazpi was encouraged by his men to establish a Spanish settlement in Panay because of the island's rich resources and strategic location. Legazpi arrived in 1570 and began organizing settlements and encomiendas under Spanish colonial administration, thereby integrating the existing barangay-based governance structure into the Spanish colonial system.

Calinog was one of the settlements that came under Spanish control. According to local tradition, the Spaniards asked the locals for the native word for “peaceful,” to which they replied, “Calinong.” The Spaniards, finding it difficult to pronounce, used “Calinog” instead, which became the town's official name.

In the early 18th century, Calinog was developed into a permanent town using the urban planning model prescribed by the Spanish colonial Laws of the Indies. This model mandated a central plaza surrounded by key structures such as a church, municipal hall (tribunal), school, and public market—a layout that continues to define Calinog's town center today. In 1763, Calinog was officially declared a pueblo (town) by the Spanish colonial government.

=== Contemporary ===
In a speech on August 7, 2016, President Rodrigo Duterte named then-Mayor Alex Centena in a speech as allegedly involved in the illegal drug trade.

== Geography ==
Calinog is a landlocked region that is 58 kilometres (36 mi) from Iloilo City and 75 kilometres (47 mi) from Roxas City.

=== Barangays ===
Calinog is politically subdivided into 59 barangays. Each barangay consists of puroks, and some have sitios.

The central region, known as the "poblacion area," is composed of 4 barangays, namely: Poblacion Centro, Poblacion Ilaya, Poblacion Delgado, and Poblacion Rizal Ilaud. A proposal exists to add five more barangays to the urban land area. They are Barangays Carvasana, Dalid, Simsiman, Bo. Calinog, and Libot. The following constitute the greater Poblacion area.

- Agcalaga
- Aglibacao
- Aglonok
- Alibunan
- Badlan Grande
- Badlan Pequeño
- Badu
- Balaticon
- Banban Grande
- Banban Pequeño
- Binolosan Grande
- Binolosan Pequeño
- Cabagiao
- Cabugao
- Cahigon
- Barrio Calinog
- Camalongo
- Canabajan
- Caratagan
- Carvasana
- Dalid
- Datagan
- Gama Grande
- Gama Pequeño
- Garangan
- Guinbonyugan
- Guiso
- Hilwan
- Impalidan
- Ipil
- Jamin-ay
- Lampaya
- Libot
- Lonoy
- Malaguinabot
- Malag-It
- Malapawe
- Malitbog Centro
- Mambiranan
- Manaripay
- Marandig
- Masaroy
- Maspasan
- Nalbugan
- Owak
- Poblacion Centro
- Poblacion Delgado
- Poblacion Rizal Ilaud
- Poblacion Ilaya
- Baje San Julian
- San Nicolas
- Simsiman
- Tabucan
- Tahing
- Tibiao
- Tigbayog
- Toyungan
- Ulayan
- Supanga

=== Climate ===
Climate data for Calinog, Iloilo
Month	Jan	Feb	Mar	Apr	May	Jun	Jul	Aug	Sep	Oct	Nov	Dec	Year
Mean daily maximum °C (°F)	29 (84)	31 (88)	32 (90)	33 (91)	31 (88)	30 (86)	29 (84)	29 (84)	29 (84)	29 (84)	29 (84)	29 (84)	30 (86)
Mean daily minimum °C (°F)	22 (72)	22 (72)	22 (72)	23 (73)	25 (77)	25 (77)	24 (75)	24 (75)	24 (75)	24 (75)	23 (73)	22 (72)	23 (74)
Average precipitation mm (inches)	48 (1.9)	41 (1.6)	58 (2.3)	82 (3.2)	223 (8.8)	300 (11.8)	346 (13.6)	307 (12.1)	311 (12.2)	292 (11.5)	167 (6.6)	81 (3.2)	2,256 (88.8)
Average rainy days	11.4	7.7	11.3	15.4	25.7	28.5	29.5	28.7	28.3	28.7	21.8	15.2	252.2
Source: Meteoblue (Use with caution: this is modeled/calculated data, not measured locally.)

Calinog, as well as the rest of Iloilo, is characterized by a tropical wet and dry climate. The wet season typically runs from May to November, and the dry season from December to April. July is the wettest month on average. Temperatures are consistent year-round in the region.

=== Mountains ===
Some of Calinog's notable mountain features include Mount Iglawlaw in Barangay Manaripay. The municipality is situated on the eastern side of the Central Panay Mountain Range, which serves as a natural boundary between Iloilo and Antique provinces.

=== Topography ===
The landscape of Calinog varies from flat, low-lying areas to rolling hills and mountain ranges. The recorded elevation for Calinog is 55 meters, though this likely refers to the town proper and does not reflect the higher mountain ranges.

== Demographics ==
Population census of Calinog
Year	Pop.	±% p.a.
1903	4,194	—
1939	22,175	+4.73%
1948	25,484	+1.56%
1960	29,913	+1.34%
1970	25,996	−1.39%
1975	30,074	+2.97%
1980	32,897	+1.81%
1990	41,113	+2.25%
1995	45,452	+1.90%
2000	48,454	+1.38%
2007	51,018	+0.71%
2010	54,430	+2.38%
2015	60,413	+2.01%
2020	62,853	+0.84%
2024	63,896	+0.40%
Source: Philippine Statistics Authority

In the 2024 census, the population of Calinog was 63,896 people, with a density of 230 inhabitants per square kilometre or 600 inhabitants per square mile.

=== Ethnic groups ===
There are two ethnic groups within Calinog, the Suludnon or Bukidnon tribe, and the Aeta. The Suludnon or Bukidnon tribe comprises the thirteen (13) mountain barangays. The Aeta group resides in the other barangays of the municipality.

=== Languages ===
The main local languages are Hiligaynon, Capiznon and Kinaray-a. Though Filipino and English are understood by the residents, they are seldom used in daily life.

== Economy ==
Poverty incidence of Calinog (%)

Source: Philippine Statistics Authority

== Infrastructure ==
=== Jalaur River Multipurpose Project II ===
In July 2024, the Jalaur Dam was completed on the Jalaur River in Calinog. The dam is part of the Jalaur River Multi-Purpose Project Stage II (JRMP II), supported by Philippine President Bongbong Marcos and former Philippine Senator Franklin Drilon. The dam was originally expected to boost the annual rice production in the area to about 320,000 metric tons.

== Education ==
Two school district offices govern all educational institutions within the municipality. They oversee the management and operations of all private and public schools, from primary to secondary schools. These are the:

- Calinog I Schools District
- Calinog II Schools District

=== Primary and elementary schools ===
- Agcalaga Elementary School
- Aglibacao Elementary School
- Alibunan Elementary School
- Aglonok Primary School
- Badlan Central School
- Badu Elementary School
- Banban Elementary School
- Binolusan Grande Elementary School
- Binolusan Pequeño Elementary School
- Brain Quest Scholastic Academy
- Cabagiao Elementary School
- Cahigon Elementary School
- Calinog Convention Baptist Church Learning Center
- Calinog Elementary School
- Calinog Faith Christian Learning Center
- Caratagan Primary School
- Carvasana Elementary School
- Consolacion Celo - Palmares Elementary School
- Datagan Elementary School
- Guinbunyogan Primary School
- Guiso Elementary School
- Hilwan Primary School
- Intapian Elementary School
- Ipil Elementary School
- Ivesa Primary School
- Jamin-ay Elementary School
- Jaycon Elementary School
- Malag-it Elementary School
- Malanginabot Primary School
- Malitbog Elementary School
- Mambiranan Elementary School
- Marandig Primary School
- Marinas Primary School
- Mary Immaculate Academy
- Masaroy Primary School
- Maspasan Elementary School
- Mt. Baloy II Primary School
- Nalbugan Elementary School
- Oxmont Memorial Academy
- San Julian Elementary School
- San Nicolas Elementary School
- Sparklers School of Communication and Arts
- Supanga Elementary School
- Tabucan Elementary School
- Tahing Elementary School
- Tibiao Elementary School
- Tigbayog Primary School
- Ulayan Elementary School

=== Secondary schools ===
- Alcarde Gustilo Mem. National High School
- Badlan National High School
- Binolusan Pequeño National High School
- Calinog National Comprehensive High School
- Carvasana National High School
- Esteban S. Javellana Memorial High School
- Fernandez Perez Memorial National High School
- Gama Integrated School
- Malitbog National High School
- Tuyongan Integrated School

=== Higher educational institution ===
- West Visayas State University

== Media ==
- 94.7 MHz Spirit FM Calinog (DYMI)
- 98.7 MHz Hot FM Calinog (DYCL)
- 100.1 MHz K3 FM Calinog

== Notable personalities ==
- Federico Caballero – Chanter of epic poetry
- Shirmar Felongco – Professional footballer
- Antonio Nafarrete – Philippine army general
- Emmanuel Trance – Prelate of the Catholic Church

== See also ==
- Jalaur River
