= San Enrique, Iloilo =

Municipality in Iloilo, Philippines

San Enrique
- Municipality
- Municipality of San Enrique
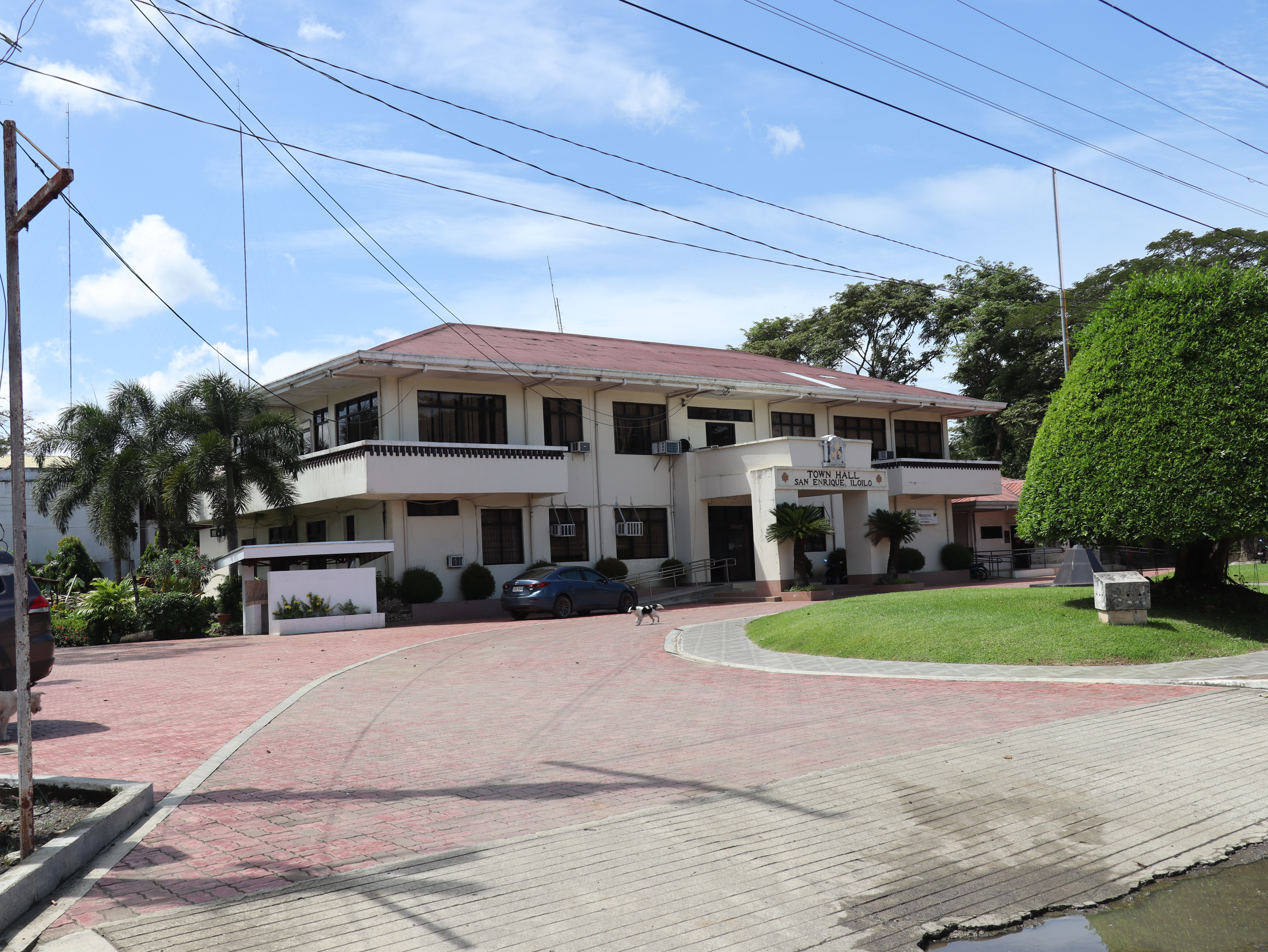
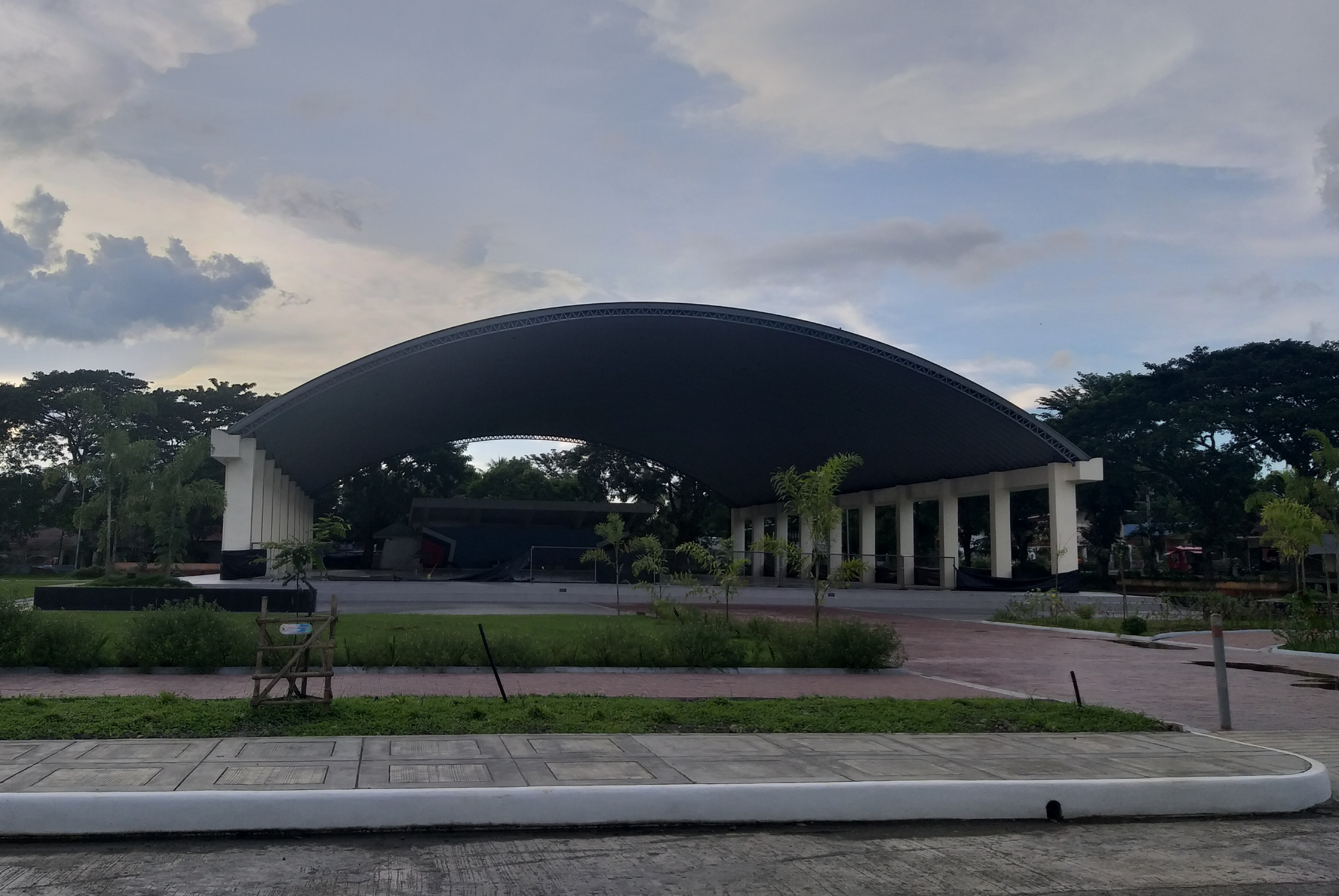
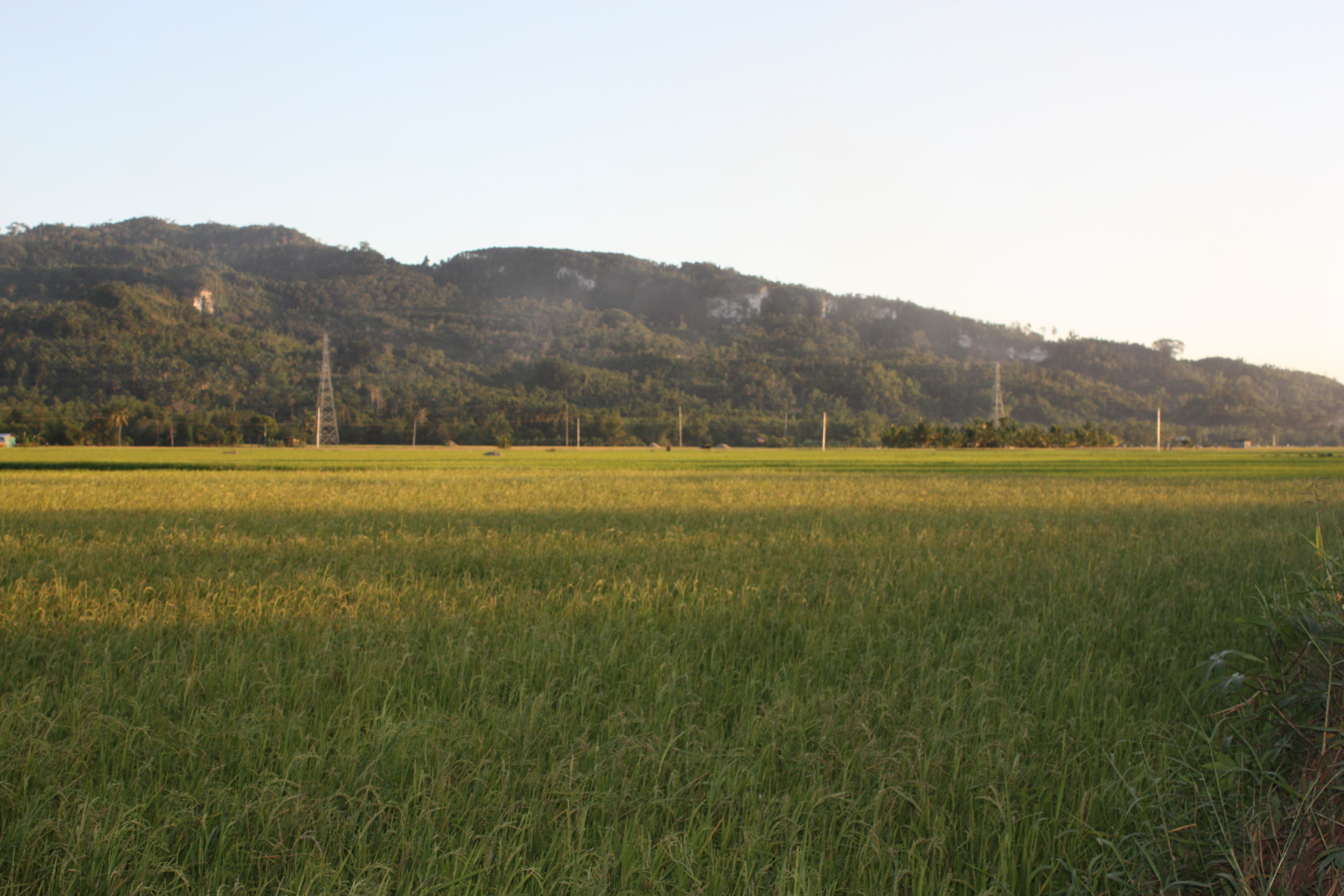
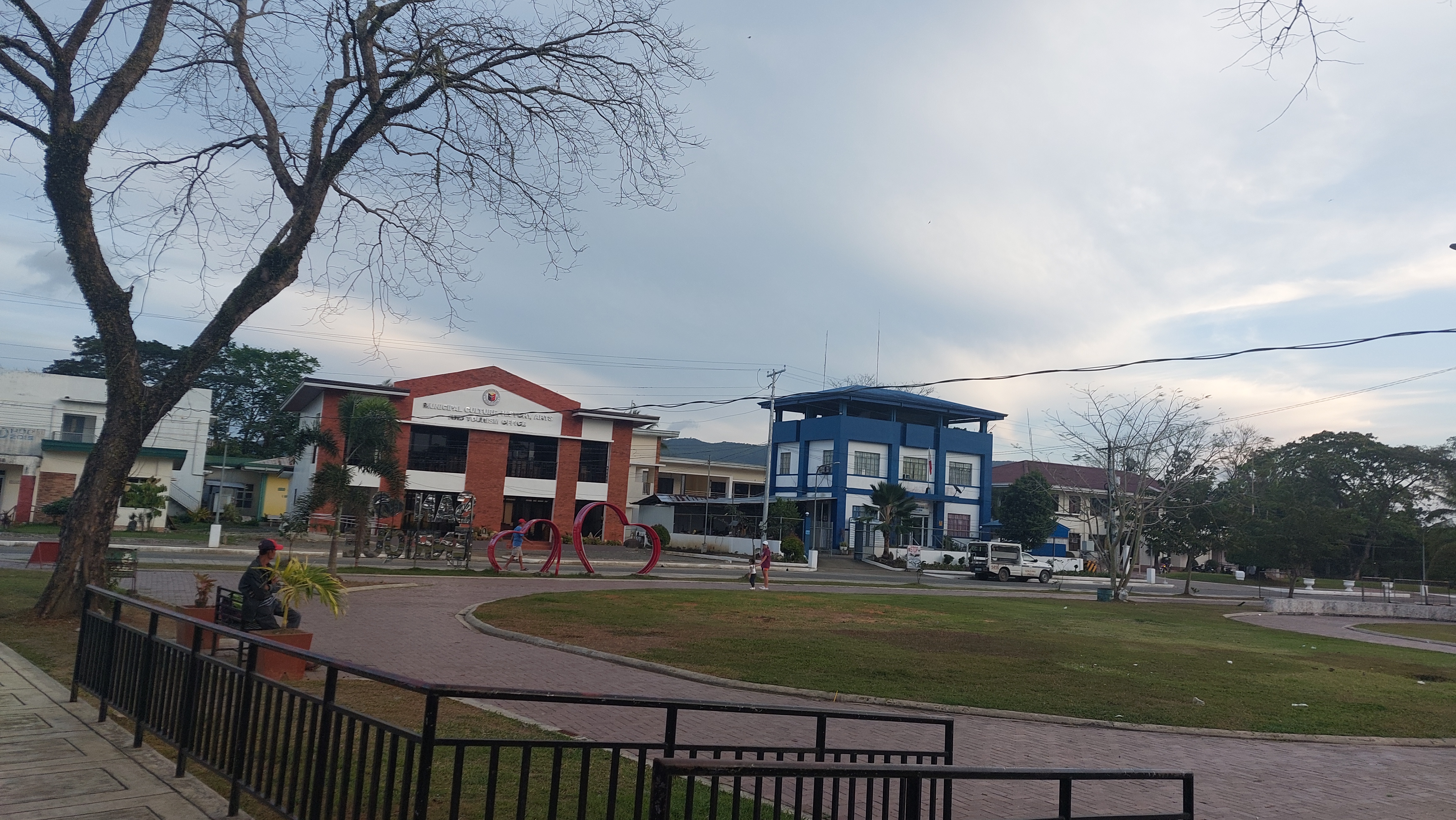
- (From top, left to right): San Enrique Municipal Hall, Covered Court, Bulabog Putian Mountain, Public Plaza

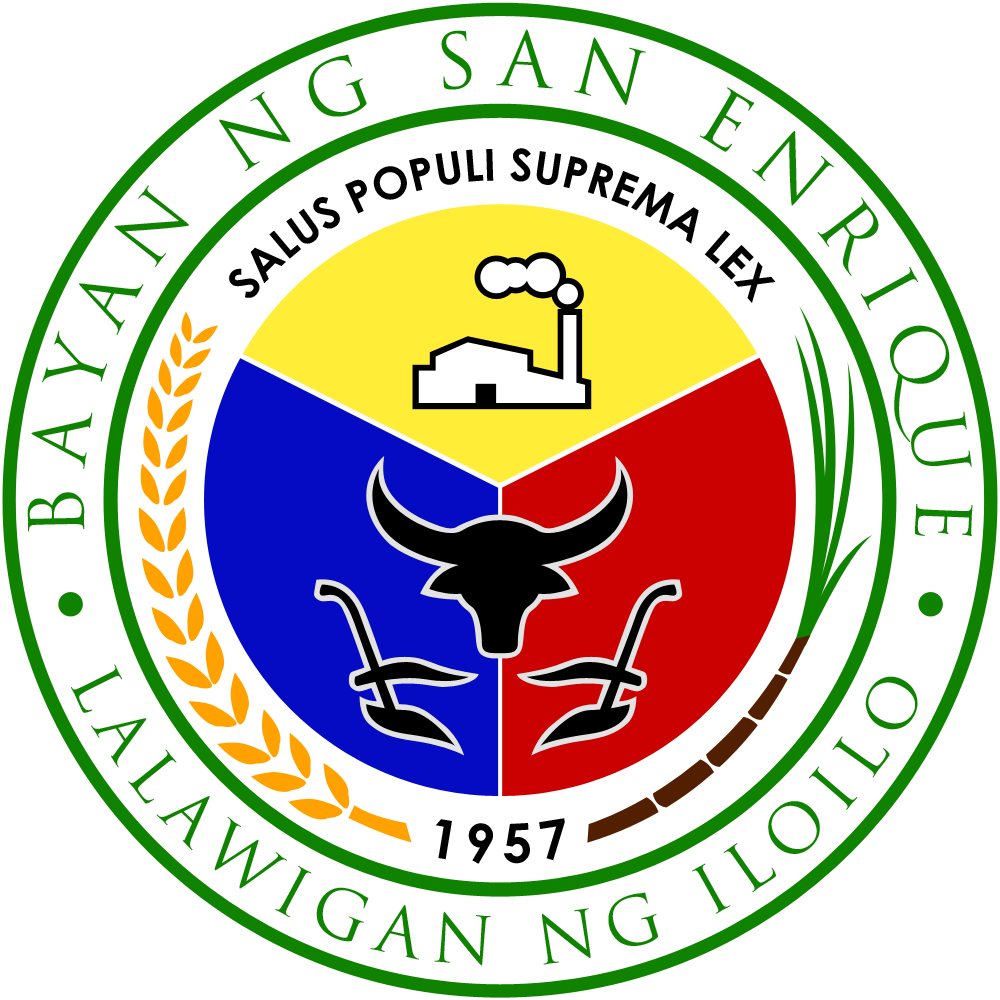
- Flag Seal
- Motto: Salus Populi Est Suprema Lex
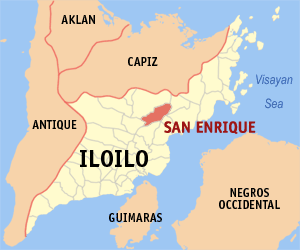
- Map of Iloilo with San Enrique highlighted
- Interactive map of San Enrique
- Location within the Philippines
- Coordinates: 11°04′11″N 122°39′24″E
- Country: Philippines
- Region: Western Visayas
- Province: Iloilo
- District: 4th district
- Founded: July 12, 1975
- Barangays: 28 (see Barangays)

Government
  - Type: Sangguniang Bayan
  - Mayor: Gian Carlo Niño P. Fernandez (Nacionalista)
  - Vice Mayor: Rosario Mediatrix P. Fernandez (Nacionalista)
  - Representative: Ferjenel G. Biron (Nacionalista)
  - Municipal Council: Members: Deza P. Pamposa (Nacionalista); Susan A. Villalobos (Nacionalista); Rhaylan U. Cordero (RP); Jose P. Fernandez (Nacionalista); Julius D. Paclibar (Nacionalista); Laila P. Deasis (Nacionalista); Julius P. Paclibar (Nacionalista); Margie S. Enriquez (RP); Vicente Pablico, Jr. ^{‡}; Lissca J. Padernal ^{◌}; ‡ ex officio ABC president; ◌ ex officio SK chairman
  - Electorate: 23,393 voters (2025)

Area
  - Total: 110.28 km^{2} (42.58 sq mi)
- Elevation: 61 m (200 ft)
- Highest elevation: 318 m (1,043 ft)
- Lowest elevation: 26 m (85 ft)

Population (2024 census)
  - Total: 37,381
  - Density: 338.96/km^{2} (877.91/sq mi)
  - Households: 9,622

Economy
  - Income class: 2nd municipal income class
  - Poverty incidence: 18.79% (2023)
  - Revenue: ₱ 181.2 million (2024)
  - Assets: ₱ 323.7 million (2024)
  - Expenditure: ₱ 70.38 million (2024)
  - Liabilities: ₱ 54.89 million (2024)

Service provider
  - Electricity: Iloilo 2 Electric Cooperative (ILECO 2)
- Time zone: UTC+8 (PST)
- ZIP code: 5036
- PSGC: 063039000
- IDD : area code: +63 (0)33
- Native languages: Karay-a; Hiligaynon; Capisnon; Tagalog
- Website: www.sanenrique-iloilo.gov.ph

San Enrique, officially the Municipality of San Enrique (Hiligaynon: Banwa sang San Enrique, Tagalog: Bayan ng San Enrique), is a municipality in the province of Iloilo, Philippines. According to the 2024 census, it has a population of 37,381 people.

== Geography ==
San Enrique is 54 kilometres (34 mi) from the provincial capital, Iloilo City.

=== Barangays ===
San Enrique is politically subdivdied into 28 barangays. Each barangay consists of puroks and some have sitios.

- Abaca
- Asisig
- Bantayan
- Braulan
- Cabugao Nuevo
- Cabugao Viejo
- Camiri
- Compo
- Catan-Agan
- Cubay
- Dacal
- Dumiles
- Garita
- Gines Nuevo
- Imbang Pequeño
- Imbesad-an
- Iprog
- Lip-ac
- Madarag
- Mapili
- Paga
- Palje
- Poblacion Ilawod
- Poblacion Ilaya
- Quinolpan
- Rumagayray
- San Antonio
- Tambunac

== History ==
=== The Early San Enriquenhons ===
The earliest inhabitants of San Enrique may be traced back to the tribes of the great Datus who had moved up the river Jalaud and settled on a promontory they called “Bontoc” near the eastern banks where they tilled land and practiced farming and animal husbandry for a self-sustaining economy. Following their customs and united by the bonds of kinship they built a community.

Out of that flourishing settlement later rose great men like Manuel Paez, Modesto Palabrica and Apolinario Palabrica, who had earlier become Capitanes of the mother town of Passi. The names of Santiago Pama, Augusto Palencia, Gregorio Aguilar, Bartolo Garrido, Cipriano Gonzales, Vicente Quinzon, and others surnamed Palabrica and Paez, had been elected to the position of Capitanes or Tenientes. Other men Simon Padios and Florencio Villalobos emerged as leaders and followed the footstep of their forebears in the long journey to progress.

=== Founding the Pueblo and Ecclesia ===
The history of San Enrique had been largely set up by geography. High-rise mountains gave origins to the river Asisig and Agutayan whose water meet and collide in confluence with the water of powerful Jala-ud which marks the south eastern boundaries of the town. Torrential rains in the past brought about by erratic atmospheric changes caused heavy flooding that rendered roads impassable. Often it leaves Bontoc isolated for days, even weeks from the Pueblo of Passi, depriving the inhabitants of the much needed civil and ecclesiastical services. The situation prompted the leaders of Bontoc to send a seven-page petition. Expediente de 1877, urging the politico- military governor, Don Enrique Fajardo y Garcia to support their bid to establish an independent pueblo from the mother town. After twenty-two endorsements from several colonial offices the petition was approved by the Ministro de Ultramar and later confirmed by a Royal Order from the Spanish King. In recognition of the patronizing efforts of the Governor, a grateful people named the town after him and further added a celestial fervour to this act of gratitude by putting the halo of a saint before the name of a benefactor.

The founding of the parish was surrounded and shrouded with the aura of conflict and drama. Unlike the pueblo, the parish was born out of protest against the creeping anti-clericalism of liberal Spaniards coming from Spain who were pestering the parishes like flies during the summer months. To defend his flock an equally zealous friar curate rallied them under the protective mantle of catholic tradition and moved his church to Abaca, one and a half league away from the town of Passi.

With reconciliation coming after, the church in Abaca, remained as a chaplaincy of the mother parish of Passi. But when the pueblo de San Enrique was established by virtue of a Real Orden from the King Alfonso XII (1874-1885) in 1879, the church at Abaca was fused with the town in pursuance to the requisite of one town and one church policy during the colonial times. Thus, the parish of Auxilium Christianorum can tell of its unique origin as an ecclesia that had antedated by more than half a century the founding of its counterpart, the pueblo.

=== Pre-dominant Religion ===
To this day, Catholicism implanted by the early Spanish missionaries remains as the dominant religion of San Enriquenhons. More than ninety percent of the populations are Catholics and there are no reliable statistical indications that their number would lessen in the future.

Their faith went through difficult and trying times. After the war there was a revival and renewal of commitment to the faith of their forebears as shown by the emergence of different organizations and councils that like in the past combined the zeal of worship with the energies of civility.

Modern evangelizing techniques have largely superseded the role of Catechism in strengthening the faith of the people. Whether it is the imposing majority of Catholic rituals or then real inspiration of its doctrine that drives throngs of church goers during Sunday masses and Lenten services, the high place of Catholicism in their hearts and mind can be safely assured.

=== The American Era ===
The American occupation of the islands brought numerous changes in the course of the history of San Enrique. The title of Capitan was changed to Presidente, to suggest a civilian tone to marshal government. The first elected Presidente in 1902 was Quiterio Paez, whose term was cut short when he died a year after. But the growing clamour among Filipino national leaders for immediate independence forced the American civil administration to fuse towns into municipal districts in preparation for the election of deputies to the Philippine Assembly in 1907. San Enrique was fused with Passi along with Dueñas and Calinog. However, the creation of an all Filipino legislature as provided by the Jones Law of 1916, gave way for individual towns, to break away from the fusion and regain their original townhood. Dueñas regained her independence in 1916 and Calinog followed in 1921. San Enrique, whether for lack of hindsight or mere complacency, remained contented with the status of arrabal or suburb of Passi for more than five decades in anticipation of a new leader who would provide the impetus for writing another chapter of its contemporary history.

=== The Restoration ===
Half century was a long interlude for the next act in the dramatic history of San Enrique. Five decades had created a leadership vacuum calling for someone with a crusading spirit to spearhead a movement for a second emancipation. The need for a leader as well as the rising expectations ushered by the post war years brought to the political scene the person of Jesus P. Prudente, a charismatic leader who provided the vision towards the historic restoration of the original independent townhood of San Enrique.

When news about the plan to bring San Enrique back to its original independence reached the population they were overjoyed. Prudente was looked up to by the people as a modern Messiah who would lead them to freedom.

During an exploratory talk held at the house of his aunt, Maura Ponte in Barangay Camiri, Prudente and his closest friends stressed the need to launch a movement aimed at separating San Enrique from Passi. This was followed by a core group meeting at the old municipal building.in the presence of Ernesto Palabrica, Jose Lacsao, Crispin Lademora and Rodrigo Ponte, he laid down the mechanics for the reconstitution of the town into a separate political entity. At the Assembly Meeting called on November 25, 1956, a big crowd clustered in the market place at the corner of Palabrica and Manolo Paez Streets. In his stirring speech, Dr. Zosimo Palencia, then number one Councilor of Passi assured them of his wholehearted support. Other impassioned speakers were Exequiel Garrido, Jesus Paclibar, Juan Ayupan, Ernesto Palabrica, Genaro Aguilar and Manuel P. Pama. Also noteworthy was the participation of the San Enrique Youth Association (SEYA), which intensified the fervour of the movement.

Convinced that the great gathering was a reflection of the real sentiments of the people, Mayor Filoteo Palmares, Sr. listened to Councilors Prudente and Palencia and gave the movement its desired momentum.

The young professionals of San Enrique also got down to work. Joining Prudente’s crusade, was a young and energetic Engr. Romulo Von Lallab, Judge Mariano Basa and Luis Barrido. They prepared the documents and other requirements for the formal launching of the movement. The older San Enriquenhons did not lack enthusiasm as well. Drawing inspiration from Exequiel Garrido, Jesus Paclibar, Atty. Manual A. Pama, his younger brother Rafael and Pedro Fernandez, Rodrigo Ponte did research for the needed data to complete the reconstitution documents. The papers were hand carried by Congressman Jose Aldeguer to Malacañan. On July 12, 1957 President Carlos P. Garcia signed Executive Order No. 259-S-1957 “Creating the Municipality of San Enrique in the Province of Iloilo.”

The first set of municipal officials were appointed, with Jesus Prudente as Mayor and Manuel P. Pama as Vice-Mayor. Appointed councilors were Vicente Lallen, Concepcion L. Fernandez, Olando L. Pama and Genaro Aguilar. The latter resigned, however, and was succeeded by Carlos Poblador. Salvador Garrido was the Municipal Secretary, Jose Lacsao, Treasurer and Perfecto Lademora, Chief of Police. In the first election of municipal official in November, 1959, Jesus P. Prudente was elected Mayor with Carlos Poblador as Vice Mayor. The first elected councilors in the rank order were Rodrigo Ponte, Francisco Oro, Erlinda Garrido, Clemente Palmes, Melecio Aricaya and Luis Barrido.

=== Contemporary San Enrique ===
San Enrique today may have little likeness with the distant past. Although the landforms, rich natural resources, and the spirit of its people remain similar, progress has carried the town with its modern ways and lifestyles. The transformation of the town into a functional community has been aided by the institutions of education, religion, and industry that had taken roots in the town. These institutions have a large share in the empowerment of the people, particularly the youth sector and have propelled them to work and seek opportunities where they are at hand. But the goals that will move the new generation to act in the line set by their predecessors will largely be determined by the dynamics of change.

=== Climate ===
Climate data for San Enrique, Iloilo
| Month | Jan | Feb | Mar | Apr | May | Jun | Jul | Aug | Sep | Oct | Nov | Dec | Year |
|---|---|---|---|---|---|---|---|---|---|---|---|---|---|
| Mean daily maximum °C (°F) | 28 (82) | 29 (84) | 30 (86) | 32 (90) | 32 (90) | 30 (86) | 29 (84) | 29 (84) | 29 (84) | 29 (84) | 29 (84) | 28 (82) | 30 (85) |
| Mean daily minimum °C (°F) | 23 (73) | 22 (72) | 23 (73) | 23 (73) | 25 (77) | 25 (77) | 24 (75) | 24 (75) | 24 (75) | 24 (75) | 24 (75) | 23 (73) | 24 (74) |
| Average precipitation mm (inches) | 57 (2.2) | 37 (1.5) | 41 (1.6) | 42 (1.7) | 98 (3.9) | 155 (6.1) | 187 (7.4) | 162 (6.4) | 179 (7.0) | 188 (7.4) | 114 (4.5) | 78 (3.1) | 1,338 (52.8) |
| Average rainy days | 12.0 | 7.7 | 9.2 | 10.2 | 19.5 | 24.6 | 26.9 | 25.1 | 25.5 | 25.2 | 18.0 | 13.0 | 216.9 |
Source: Meteoblue

== Demographics ==
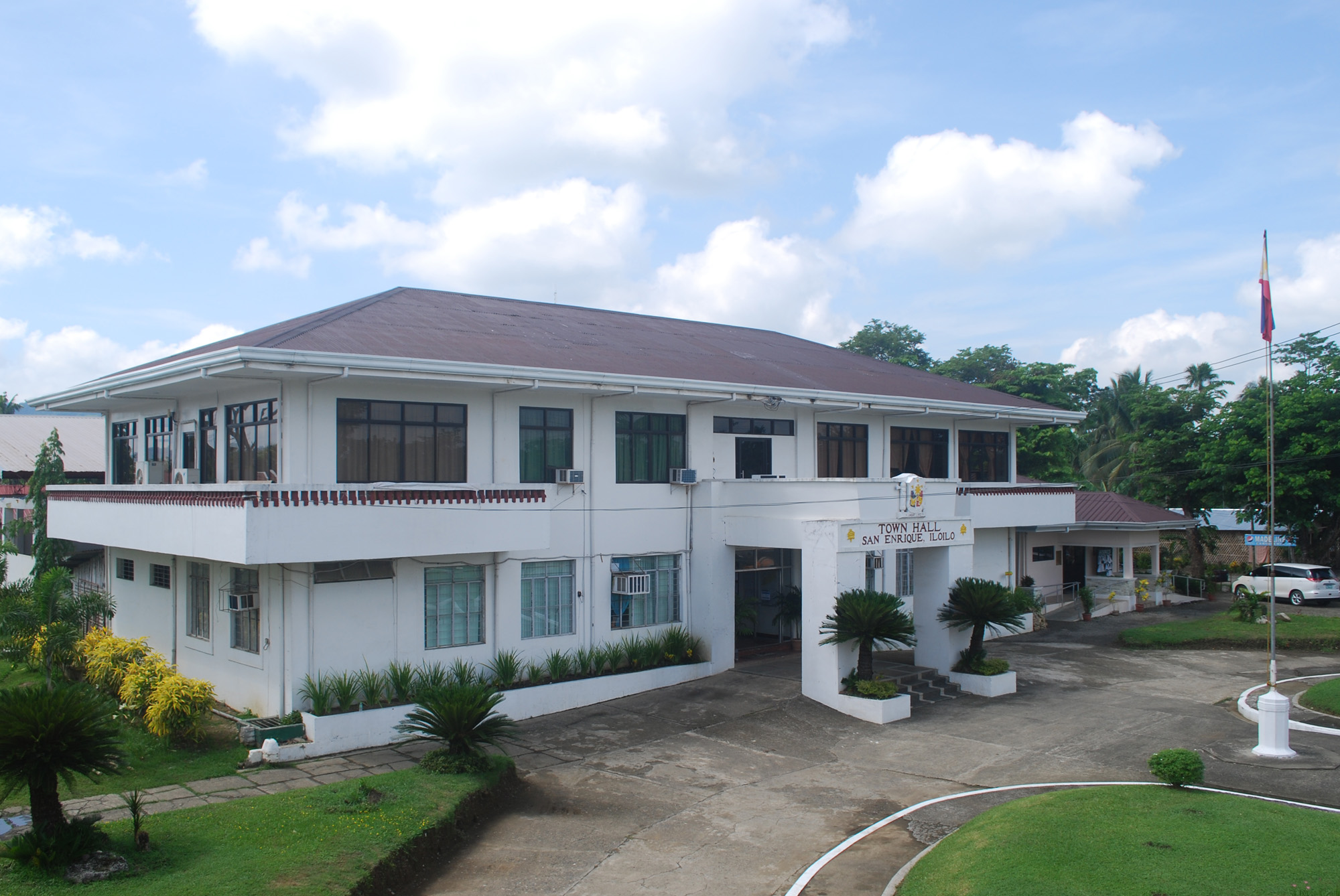
San Enrique Municipal Hall

Population census of San Enrique
| Year | Pop. | ±% p.a. |
|---|---|---|
| 1903 | 2,596 | — |
| 1960 | 11,109 | +2.58% |
| 1970 | 13,104 | +1.66% |
| 1975 | 17,270 | +5.69% |
| 1980 | 19,663 | +2.63% |
| 1990 | 24,730 | +2.32% |
| 1995 | 25,576 | +0.63% |
| 2000 | 28,655 | +2.47% |
| 2007 | 30,006 | +0.64% |
| 2010 | 32,422 | +2.86% |
| 2015 | 33,911 | +0.86% |
| 2020 | 36,911 | +1.80% |
| 2024 | 37,381 | +0.30% |
Source: Philippine Statistics Authority

In the 2024 census, the population of San Enrique was 37,381 people, with a density of 340 inhabitants per square kilometre or 880 inhabitants per square mile.

In the 1995 National Census, it had a registered total household population of 25,572, an increase of 875 over the 1990 total population of 24,697.

Aside from the prevailing inhabitants of this municipality, the transient ethnic groups that frequent this place belongs to the cultural minority, the Aetas or Negriteos. They are seasonally around during the planting and harvesting of sugarcane.

== Economy ==
Poverty incidence of San Enrique (%)

Source: Philippine Statistics Authority
