= List of islands of the Philippines =

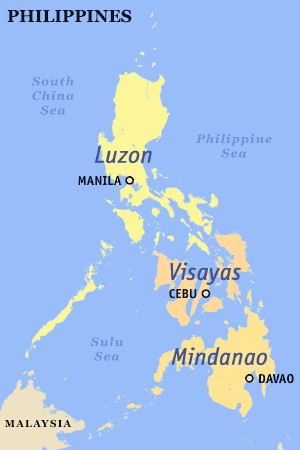
- Map of the Philippines showing the three major island groups of Luzon, Visayas, and Mindanao
- Etymology: See also: Names of the Philippines

Geography
- Location: Southeast Asia
- Adjacent to: Pacific Ocean
- Total islands: 7,641 islands
- Major islands: Luzon; Visayas; Mindanao
- Area: +300,000 km^{2} (120,000 sq mi) (Note: Includes inland bodies of water.) (Note: The actual area of the Philippines is 343,448 km^{2} (132,606 sq mi) according to some sources.)
- Area rank: 72nd
- Length: 1,850 km (1150 mi) (Note: From the South China Sea to the Celebes Sea.)
- Coastline: 36,289 km (22548.9 mi)
- Highest elevation: 2,954 m (9692 ft)
- Highest point: Mount Apo

Administration
- Philippines
- Capital city: Manila
- Largest settlement: Quezon City (pop. 3,084,270)
- President: Bongbong Marcos

Demographics
- Demonym: Filipino (neutral); Pinoy (colloquial neutral)
- Population: 112,729,484 (2024)
- Population rank: 13
- Pop. density: 363.45/km^{2} (941.33/sq mi)
- Pop. density rank: 34th
- Languages: See Languages of the Philippines
- Ethnic groups: See Ethnic groups in the Philippines

As an archipelago, the Philippines comprises 7,641 islands clustered into three major island groups: Luzon, the Visayas, and Mindanao. Only about 2,000 islands are inhabited, and more than 5,000 are yet to be officially named.

The following list breaks the islands down by region and smaller island group for easier reference.

== Largest islands of the Philippines ==
Below is a list of the largest Philippine islands. There are discrepancies in the area estimates across various sources, which would change the rankings of some smaller islands. The areas given may not be definitive.

The 50 largest islands have a combined area of around 321,000 square kilometers (124,000 sq mi) and a combined population of about 100.9 million (2015); thus they contain about 99% of the Philippines' total land area and total population (2015). The combined population of Luzon and Mindanao accounts for 80% of total population of the Philippines.

# ^{[A]}	Name of island	Area	Population	Coordinates	Notes
1	Luzon	109,965 km^{2} (42,458 sq mi)	64,260,312	15°59′59″N 121°00′00″E	15th largest island and 4th most populated island in the world
2	Mindanao	97,530 km^{2} (37,657 sq mi)	25,537,691	7°41′42″N 124°15′04″E	19th largest island in the world
3	Samar	13,429 km^{2} (5,185 sq mi)	1,880,020	11°48′00″N 125°00′43″E	Largest island entirely within one region
4	Negros	13,310 km^{2} (5,139 sq mi)	4,414,131	10°01′34″N 122°58′01″E	
5	Palawan	12,189 km^{2} (4,706 sq mi)	886,308	9°30′00″N 118°30′00″E	Largest island entirely within one province
6	Panay	12,011 km^{2} (4,637 sq mi)	4,477,247	11°10′26″N 122°30′14″E	
7	Mindoro	10,572 km^{2} (4,082 sq mi)	1,331,473	12°52′15″N 120°55′40″E	
8	Leyte	7,368 km^{2} (2,845 sq mi)	2,388,518	10°50′01″N 124°50′00″E	
9	Cebu	4,468 km^{2} (1,725 sq mi)	3,917,423	10°19′42″N 123°48′22″E	Island province
10	Bohol	3,821 km^{2} (1,475 sq mi)	1,313,560	9°50′41″N 124°12′49″E	Island province
11	Masbate	3,268 km^{2} (1,262 sq mi)	706,897	12°15′01″N 123°30′00″E	Largest of island in Masbate province
12	Catanduanes	1,523 km^{2} (588 sq mi)	260,964	13°48′31″N 124°13′24″E	Island province
13	Basilan	1,265 km^{2} (488 sq mi)	459,367	6°35′28″N 121°59′19″E	Island province; largest island of the Sulu Archipelago
14	Marinduque	952 km^{2} (368 sq mi)	234,521	13°23′06″N 121°58′52″E	Island province
15	Busuanga	890 km^{2} (344 sq mi)	73,849	12°08′42″N 120°05′41″E	Largest of the Calamian Islands
16	Jolo	869 km^{2} (336 sq mi)	530,000	5°58′24″N 121°09′00″E	Part of the Sulu Archipelago
17	Tablas	839 km^{2} (324 sq mi)	164,012	12°24′20″N 122°03′51″E	
18	Dinagat	802 km^{2} (310 sq mi)	106,951	10°13′30″N 125°35′41″E	Island province
19	Polillo	629 km^{2} (243 sq mi)	64,802	14°50′34″N 121°55′45″E	
20	Guimaras	605 km^{2} (234 sq mi)	174,613	10°34′47″N 122°36′03″E	Island province
21	Tawitawi	581 km^{2} (224 sq mi)	82,582	5°11′52″N 120°02′00″E	Island province; part of the Sulu Archipelago
22	Biliran	536 km^{2} (207 sq mi)	171,612	11°35′01″N 124°28′00″E	Island province
23	Sibuyan	465 km^{2} (180 sq mi)	59,274	12°23′10″N 122°33′40″E	
24	Siargao	437 km^{2} (169 sq mi)	94,273	9°54′19″N 126°04′00″E	
25	Burias	424 km^{2} (164 sq mi)	90,300	12°52′54″N 123°12′28″E	
26	Culion	389 km^{2} (150 sq mi)	20,139	11°49′09″N 119°57′38″E	2nd largest of the Calamian Islands
27	Siquijor	337 km^{2} (130 sq mi)	95,984	9°11′51″N 123°35′47″E	Island province
28	Ticao	334 km^{2} (129 sq mi)	95,129	12°30′58″N 123°41′41″E	
29	Dumaran	322 km^{2} (124 sq mi)		10°32′50″N 119°52′23″E	
30	Balabac	319 km^{2} (123 sq mi)		7°56′32″N 117°00′30″E	
31	Samal	301 km^{2} (116 sq mi)	104,123	7°02′52″N 125°44′39″E	
32	Sibutu	285 km^{2} (110 sq mi)	30,387	4°46′40″N 119°28′35″E	
33	Camiguin	255 km^{2} (98 sq mi)	88,478	9°10′26″N 124°42′34″E	Island province
34	Calayan	196 km^{2} (76 sq mi)	8,919	19°16′N 121°29′E	Largest of the Babuyan Islands
35	Olutanga	194 km^{2} (75 sq mi)	87,078	7°22′00″N 122°52′54″E	
36	Alabat	192 km^{2} (74 sq mi)	41,822	14°07′06″N 122°03′05″E	
37	Panaon	191 km^{2} (74 sq mi)	57,703	10°03′05″N 125°12′45″E	
38	Mapun	181 km^{2} (70 sq mi)	26,597	7°00′N 118°30′E	Formerly known as Cagayan de Tawi-tawi
39	Camiguin	166 km^{2} (64 sq mi)		18°50′00″N 121°51′36″E	Part of the Babuyan Islands in Luzon, and distinct from Camiguin in Mindanao
40	Bucas Grande	128 km^{2} (49 sq mi)	22,314	9°40′26″N 125°56′55″E	
	Lubang	125 km^{2} (48 sq mi)	28,922	13°46′03″N 120°11′10″E	
	Linapacan	120 km^{2} (46 sq mi)	15,668	11°30′N 119°54′E	Largest island in the group of islands in Linapacan Strait.
	Bugsuk	119 km^{2} (46 sq mi)		8°15′15″N 117°18′29″E	
	Bantayan	108 km^{2} (42 sq mi)	120,447	11°13′07″N 123°44′55″E	
	Pacijan	106 km^{2} (41 sq mi)		10°40′N 124°20′E	Part of Camotes Islands group
	Homonhon	105 km^{2} (41 sq mi)	4,211	10°45′21″N 125°44′21″E	
	Babuyan Claro	100 km^{2} (39 sq mi)	1,423	19°31′20″N 121°57′13″E	Part of the Babuyan Islands
	Poro	96 km^{2} (37 sq mi)	36,508	10°40′20″N 124°27′22″E	Part of Camotes Islands group
	Patnanongan	92 km^{2} (36 sq mi)	14,606	14°47′01″N 122°10′40″E	
	Panglao	91 km^{2} (35 sq mi)	79,216	9°36′N 123°49′E	
	Pangutaran	90 km^{2} (35 sq mi)	30,613	6°16′41″N 120°32′52″E	

A. Rankings only provided for the first 40 largest islands. The list is incomplete, missing some islands with unknown or unreliable areas, making the rankings for smaller islands uncertain.

=== Map ===
Major islands of the Philippines (clickable map)

== Luzon ==
=== Babuyan group ===
- Babuyan Island
- Balintang Islands
- Barit Island
- Calayan Island
- Camiguin Island
- Dalupiri Island
- Didicas Island
- Fuga Island
- Iroo Island
- Maybag Island
- Pamoctan Island
- Pan de Azucar Island
- Panuitan Island
- Pinon Island

=== Bacuit group ===
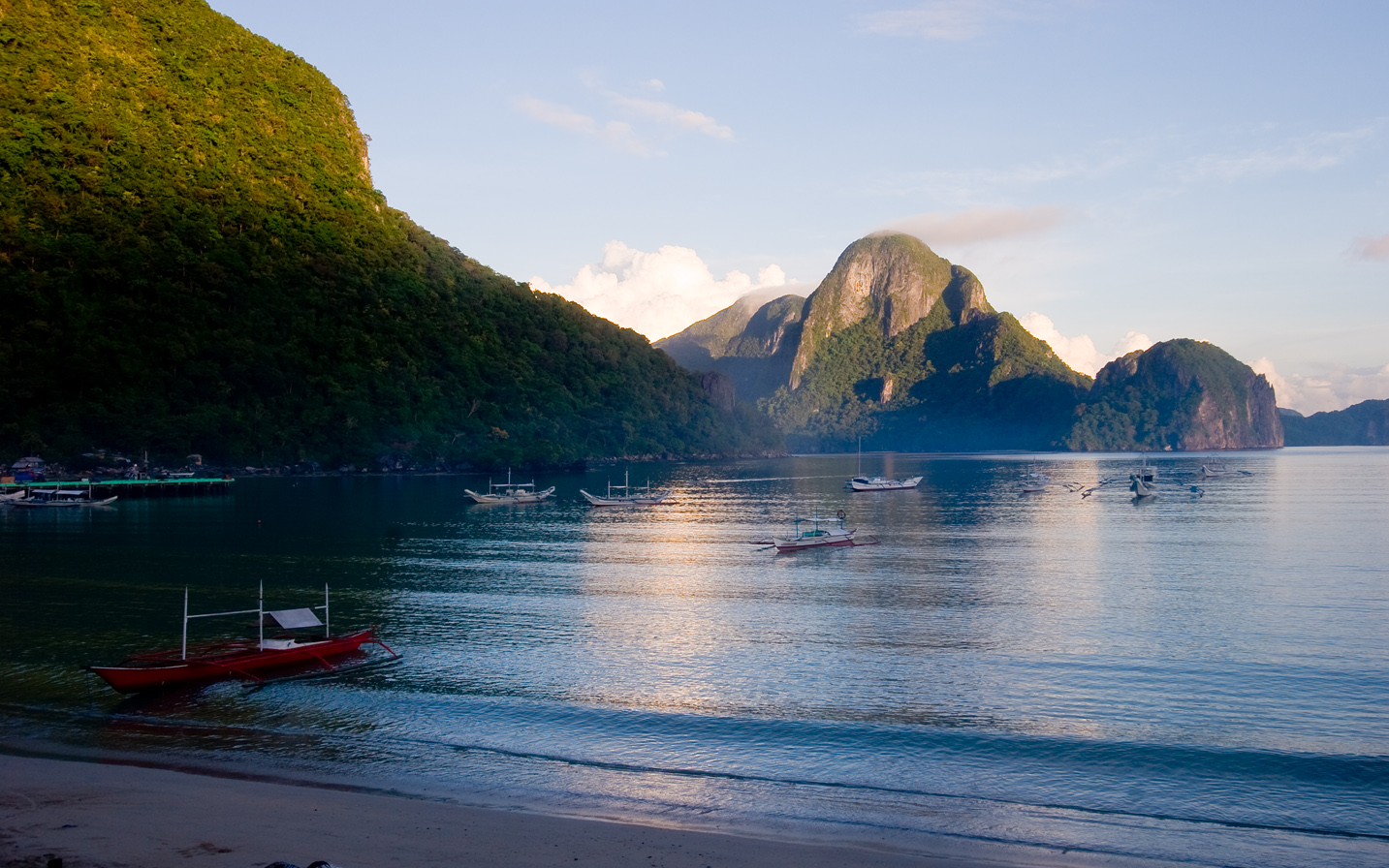
Boats at Cadlao Island

- Bury Island
- Cadlao Island
- Calitang Island
- Camago Island
- Cavayan Island
- Caverna Island
- Commando Island
- Depeldet Island
- Diapila Island
- Dibuluan Island
- Dilumacad Island
- Dolarog Island
- Emmit Island
- Entalula Island
- Guintungauan Island
- Inambuyod Island
- Lagen Island
- Lalutaya Island
- Malapacao Island
- Matinloc Island
- Miniloc Island
- Mitre Island
- Nacpan Island
- North Guntao Island
- Paglugaban Island
- Pangalusian Island
- Peaked Island
- Pinagbuyatan Island
- Pinasil Island
- Saddle Island
- Shimizu Island
- South Guntao Island
- Tapiutan Island
- Tent Islands
- Vigan Island

=== Batanes group ===
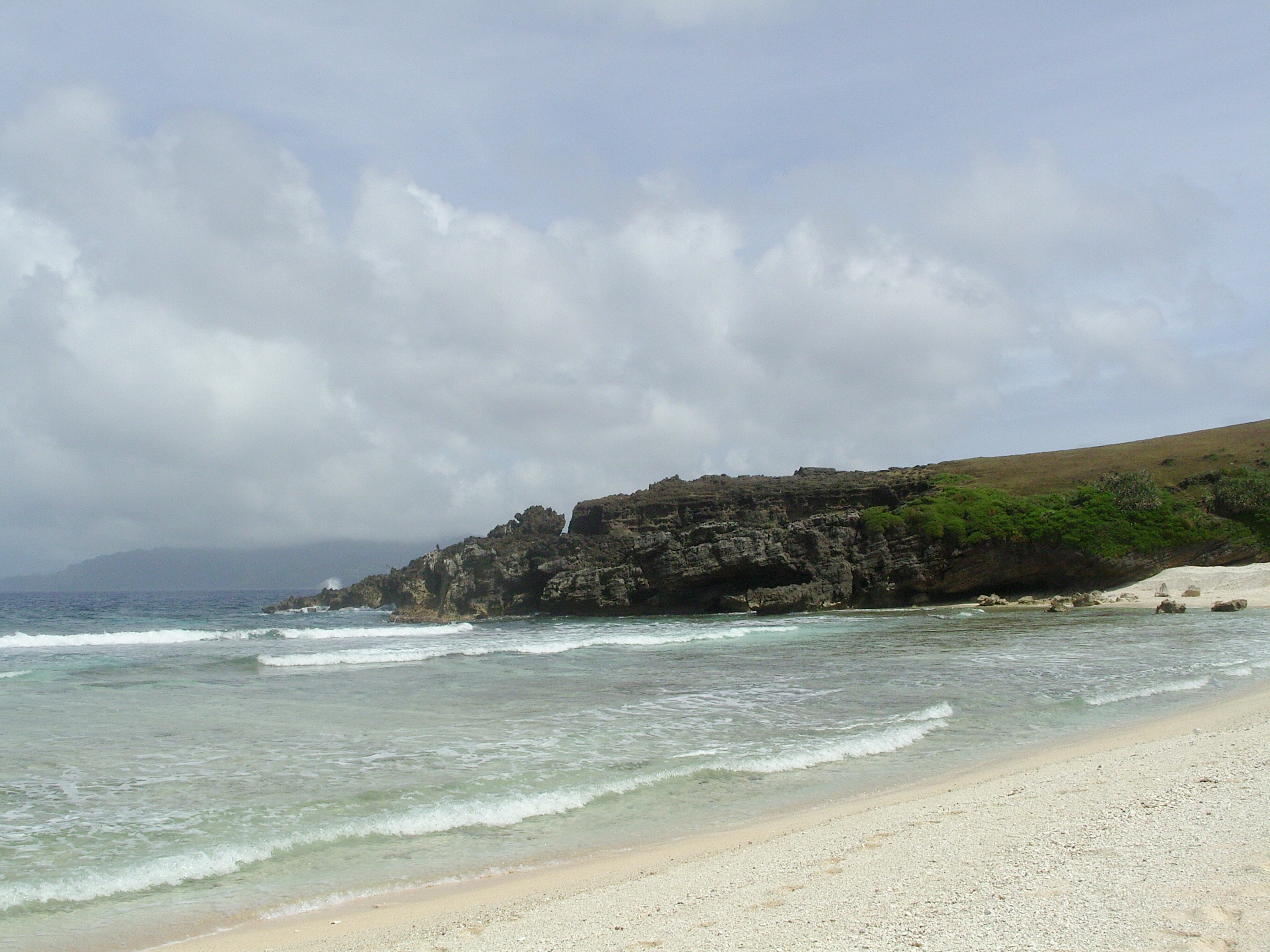
White sand beach at Sabtang island

- A'li Islet
- Batan Island
- Dequey Island
- Di'nem Island (Diogo)
- Ditarem Island (Mavudis)
- Itbayat Island
- Ivuhos Island
- Mavulis Island (Y'ami)
- Misanga Island (North Island)
- Sabtang Island
- Siayan Island

=== Bicol Region ===
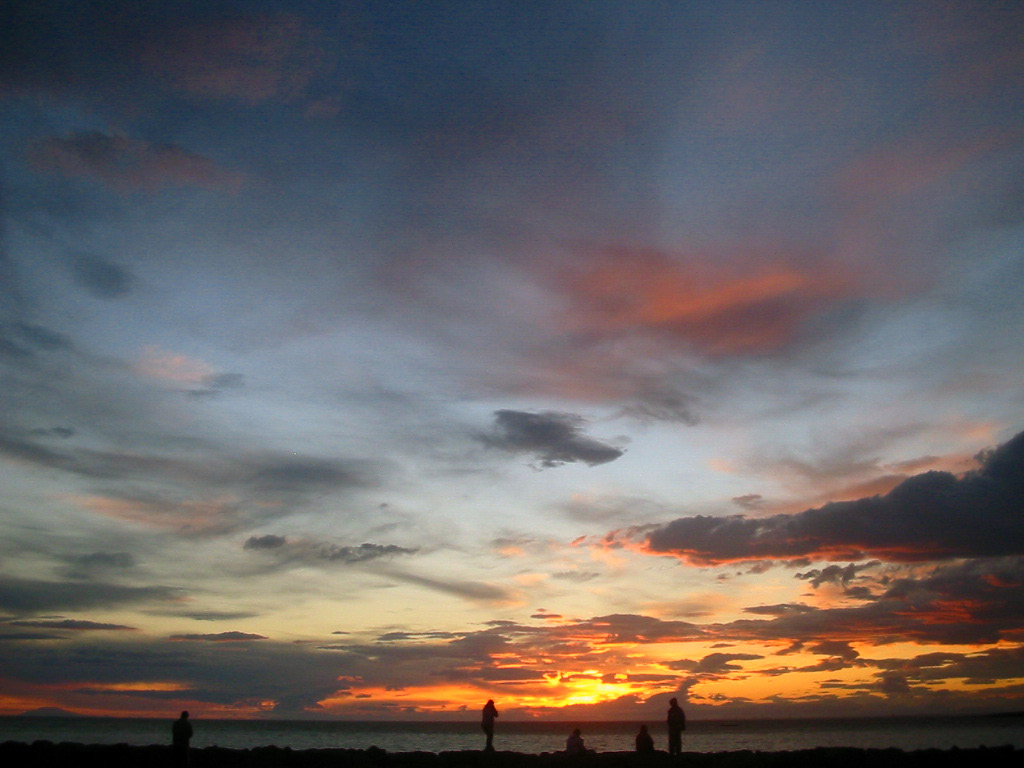
A view from Tinaga beach in Tinaga at sunset

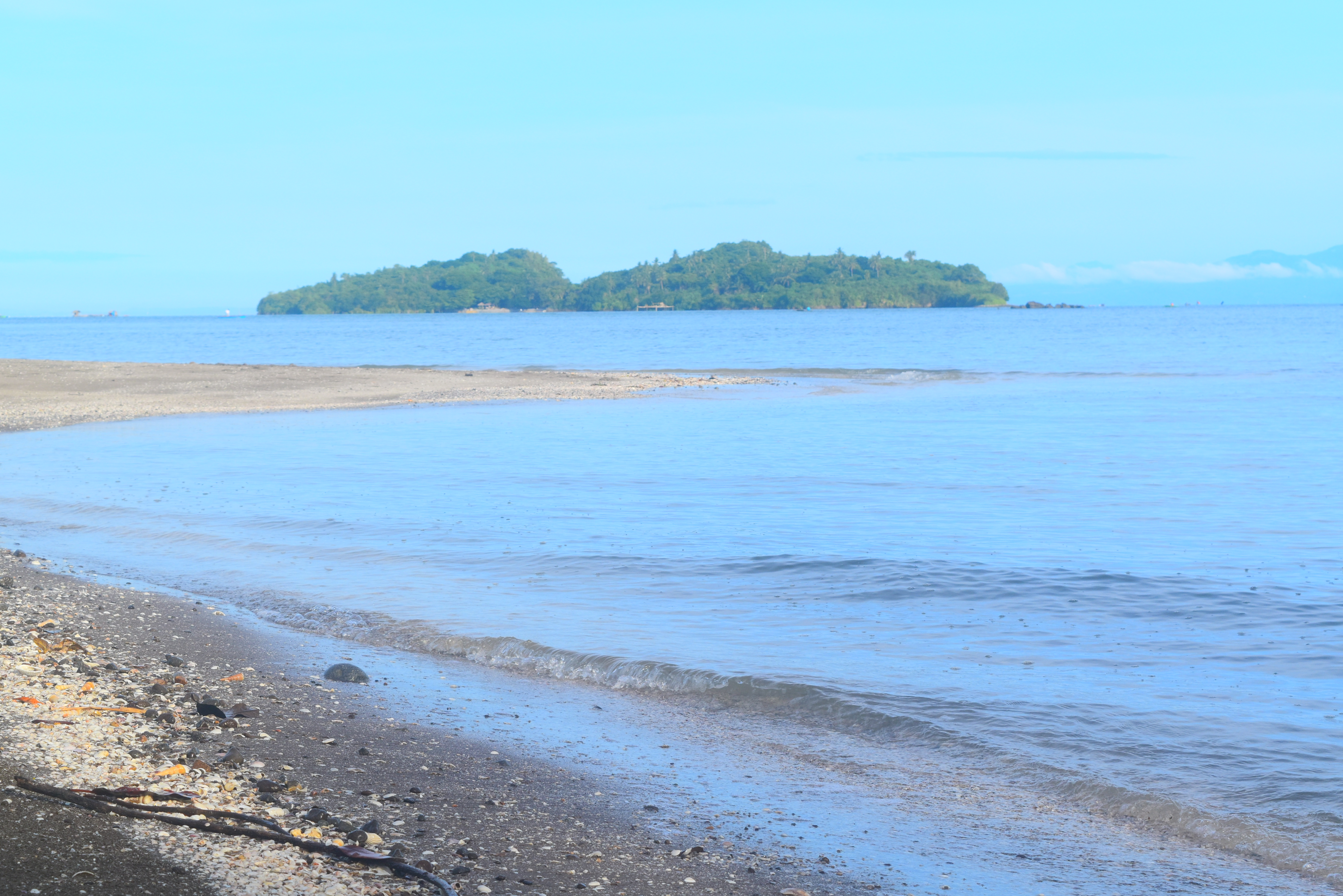
Cauit Island overlooking from Cagsao, Calabanga, Camarines Sur

- Aguirangan Island
- Anahau Island
- Anchor Island
- Animasola Island
- Apuao Grande Island
- Apuao Island
- Atulayan Island
- Bagacay Island
- Bagatao Island
- Bagieng Island
- Balagbag Islands
- Bani Island
- Basot Island
- Batan Island (Albay)
- Batan Island (Sorsogon)
- Buguias Island
- Butauanan Island
- Cagbalisay Island
- Cabgan Island
- Cagbinunga Island
- Cagbulauan Island
- Cagraray Island
- Calabagio Island
- Calaguas Islands
- Calalanag Island
- Calambayanga Island
- Calintaan Island
- Canimo Island
- Canton Island
- Capugdan Island
- Caringo Island
- Catanduanes Island
- Cauit Island
- Cimarron Islets
- Cotivas Island
- Daruanac Island
- Dehanlo Island
- Entrance Island
- Etinas Island
- Gota Island
- Guihinyan Island
- Guinabugan Island
- Guinanayan Island
- Guintinua Island
- Haponan Island
- Huag Island
- Hunongan Island
- Ingalan Island
- Juag Island
- Laja Island
- Lahos Island
- Lahuy Island
- Lamit Islands
- Lato Islet
- MacArthur Island
- Maculabo Island
- Mahadi Island
- Malarad Islands
- Malasugue Island
- Malaumauan Island
- Manito Island
- Masnou Island
- Matanga Island
- Matukad Island
- Minalahos Island
- Monteverde Island
- Ocata Island
- Pagbocayan Island
- Paguriran Island
- Palompon Islands
- Palita Island
- Palumbato Island
- Panay Island
- Parayan Island
- Pimacuapan Islands
- Pinaglukaban Island
- Pitogo Island
- Porongpong Island
- Puling Island
- Quinalasag Islands
- Quinamanuca Island
- Quinapagyan Island
- Rapu-rapu Island
- Refugio Island
- Rosa Islet
- Sabitang Laya Island
- Saboon Island
- Samur Island
- San Miguel Island (Albay)
- San Miguel Island (Camarines Sur)
- Siapa Island
- Sibauan Island
- Siruma Island
- Sombrero Island
- Subic Island
- Sula Island
- Tabusao Island
- Tag Island
- Tailon Island
- Tanao Islands
- Tanglar Island
- Ticlin Island
- Tignob Island
- Tinaga Island
- Tinago Island

=== Cagayan Valley ===
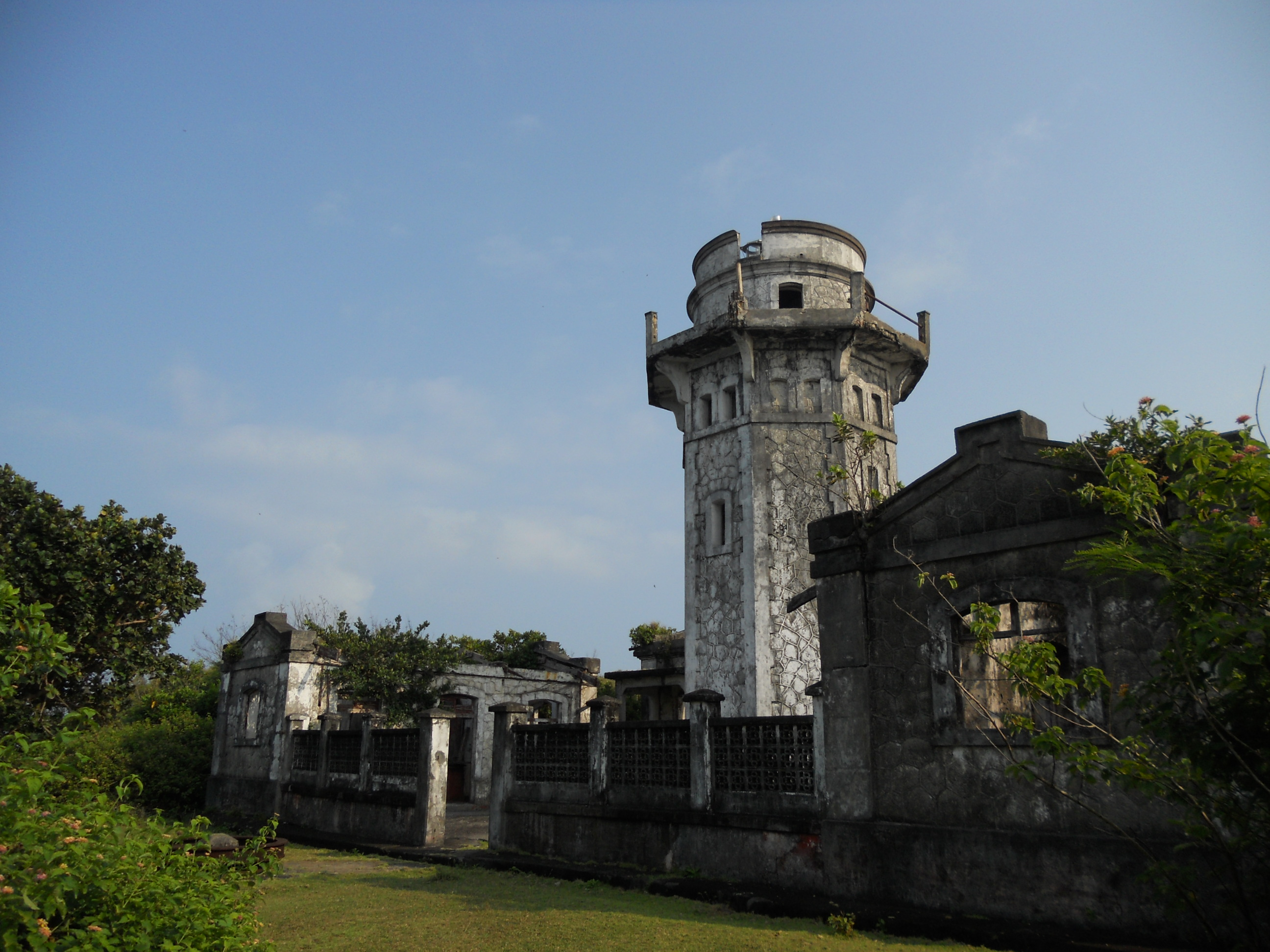
The Cape Engaño Lighthouse at Cape Engaño, Palaui Island

- Apulagan Island
- Ati Island
- Catali Island
- Cent Island
- Dipodo Island
- Disumangit Island
- Escucha Island
- Estagno Island
- Dos Hermanos Islands (Cagayan)
- Bayot Island
- Gran Laja Island
- Lafu Island
- Maloncon Island
- Manidad Island
- Masalansan Island
- Palaui Island
- Rona Island
- San Vicente Island
- Sibato Island
- Sinago Island
- Spires Island

=== Calamian Islands ===
- Alava Island
- Apo Island
- Ariara Island
- Bacbac Island
- Bakbak Island
- Bantac Island
- Barselisa Island
- Bayaca Island
- Binalabag Island
- Black Island
- Bolinah Island
- Bugur Island
- Bulalacao Island
- Bunaun Island
- Busuanga Island
- Cabilauan Island
- Cabulauan Island
- Cacayatan Island
- Cagbatan Island
- Cagdanao Island
- Calanhayaun Island
- Calauit Island
- Calibang Island
- Calipipit Island
- Calumbagan Island
- Camanga Island
- Canaron Island
- Canipo Island
- Cheron Island
- Chindonan Island
- Compare Island
- Condut Island
- Coron Island
- Culion Island
- Debogso Island
- Delian Island
- Demelias Island
- Depagal Island
- Dibanca Islands
- Dibatoc Island
- Diboyoyan Island
- Dibutonay Island
- Dicabaito Island
- Dicalubuan Island
- Dicapadiac Island
- Dicapululan Island
- Dicoyan Island
- Dimakya Island
- Dimancal Island
- Dimanglet Island
- Dimansig Island
- Dimipac Island
- Dinanglet Island
- Dinaran Island
- Dipalian Island
- Ditaytayan Island
- Diwaran Island
- Dumunpalit Island
- East Malcatop Island
- East Nalaut Island
- Elet Island
- Galoc Island
- Gintu Island
- Gued Island
- Guinlep Island
- Guintungauan Island
- Hadyibulao Island
- Hidong Island
- Horse Island
- Ile Island
- Inapupan Island
- Kalampisauan Island
- Lagat Island
- Lajo Island
- Lamud Island
- Lanit Island
- Lauauan Island
- Liatui Island
- Linapacan Island
- Lubutglubut Island
- Lusong Island
- Maapdit Island
- Magranting Island
- Malajon Island
- Malaposo Island
- Malaroyroy Island
- Malbatan Island
- Malcapuya Island
- Malcatop Island
- Malpagalen Island
- Maltatayoc Island
- Malubutglubut Island
- Manglet Island
- Manlegad Island
- Manolaba Island
- Manolebeng Island
- Marily Island
- Mayokok Island
- Mininlay Island
- Naglayan Island
- Nanga Island
- Nanga Island
- Nangalao Island
- Napula Island
- Napuscud Island
- Nici Island
- North Cay Island
- North Malbinchilao Island
- Octon Island
- Pangaldavan Island
- Pangititan Island
- Pass Island
- Patoyo Island
- Pingkitinan Island
- Popototan Island
- Rat Island
- Rhodes Island
- Salimbubuc Island
- Salung Island
- Salvacion Island
- Sangat Island
- Santa Monica Island
- South Cay Island
- Talampulan Island
- Talanpetan Island
- Tambon Island
- Tampel Island
- Tangat Island
- Tanoban Island
- Tantangon Island
- Tara Island
- Teardrop Island
- Titangcob Island
- Uson Island
- Vanguardia Island
- West Nalaut Island

=== Catanduanes ===
- Balacay Island
- Calabagio Island
- Jumbit Islets
- Lete Island
- Macalanhag Island
- Maguinling Island
- Tignob Island
- Panay Island
- Porongpong Island
- Pinohagan Island
- Pondanan Island
- Virac Island

=== Central Luzon ===
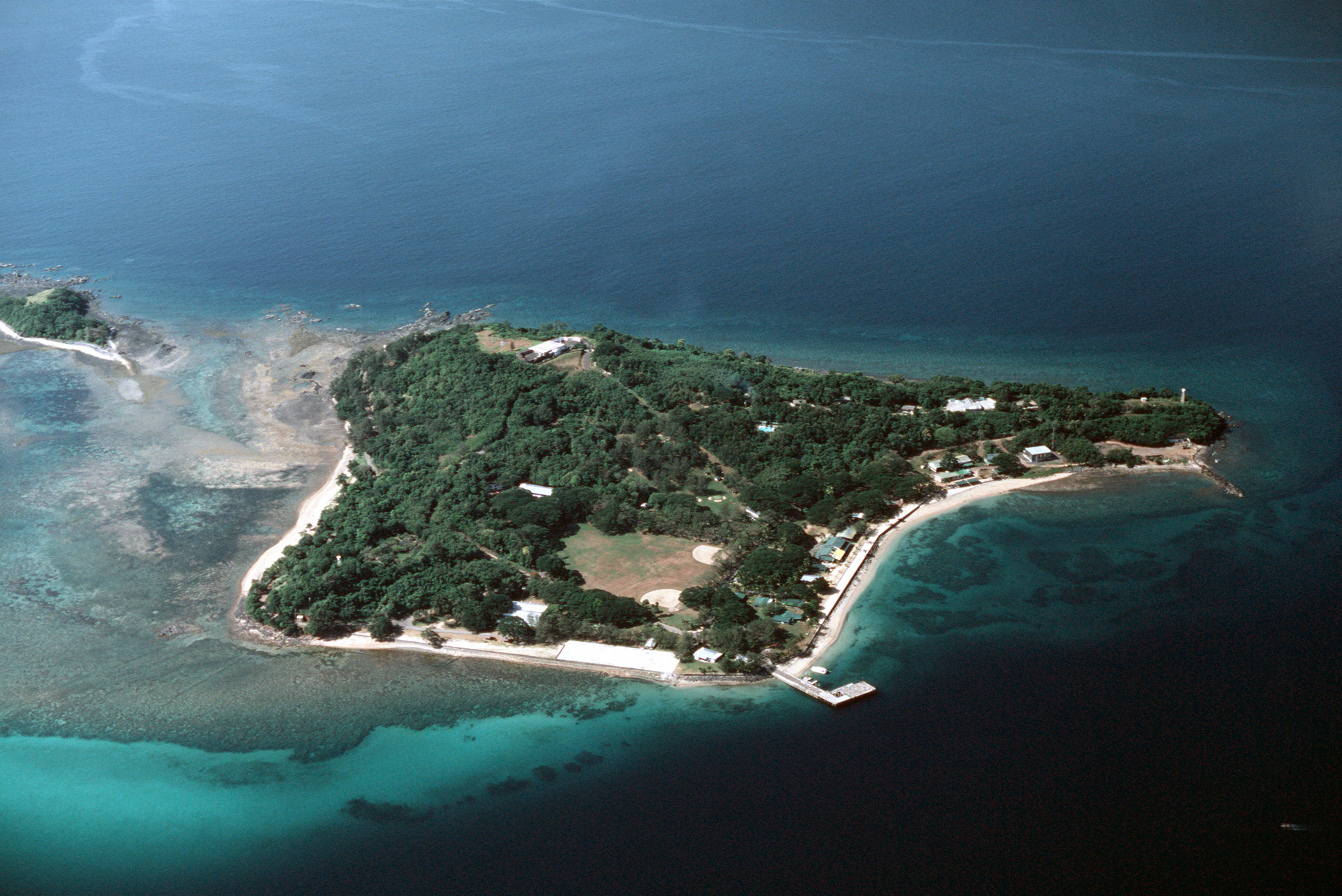
Grande Island

- Camara Island
- Capones Island
- Egg Islands
- Hermana Mayor Island
- Hermana Menor Island
- Los Frailes Islands
- Magalawa Island
- Matalvi Island
- Pamana (Pequeña) Island
- Potipot Island
- Salvador Island
- Scarborough Shoal (disputed island between China and Philippines)
- Silanguin Island
- Subic Chiquita Island
- Grande Island
- Tabones Island

=== Cuyo Archipelago ===
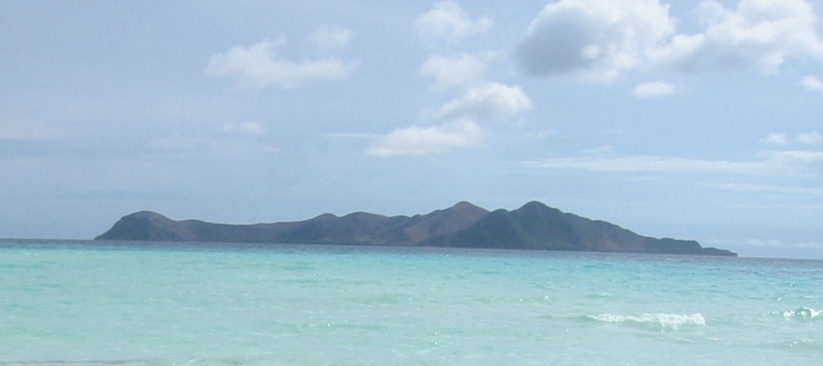
Manamoc Island as seen from the north

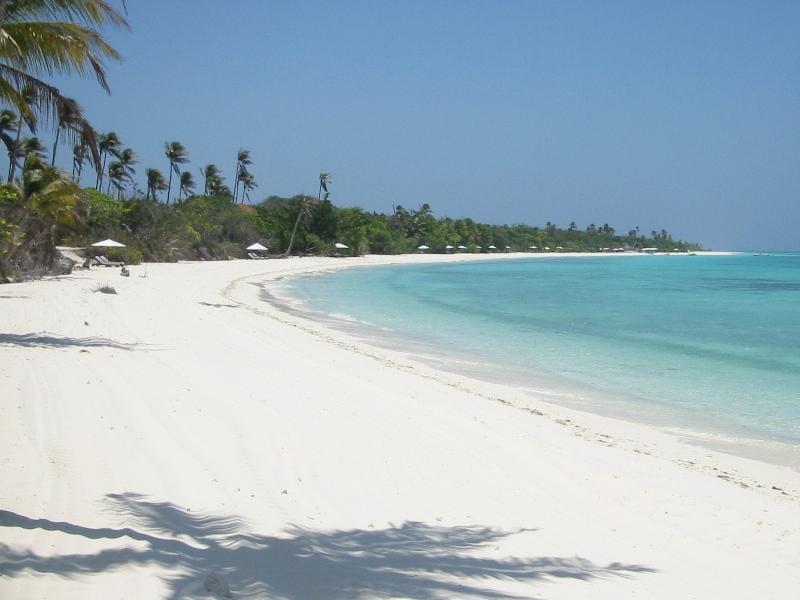
The main beach on the southern shore of Pamalican

- Adunbrat Island
- Agutaya Island
- Algeciras Island
- Bararin Island
- Bisucay Island
- Canipo Island
- Caponyan Island
- Cauayan Island
- Cocoro Island
- Cuyo Island
- Dit Island
- Eke Island
- Guinlabo Island
- Halog Island
- Imalaguan Island
- Imaruan Island
- Indagamy Island
- Lean Island
- Lubid Island
- Malcatop Island
- Maligun Island
- Manamoc Island
- Mandit Island
- Maracañao Island
- Matarabis Island
- Oco Island
- Pamalican Island
- Pamitinan Island
- Pandan Island
- Pangatatan Island
- Patunga Island
- Paya Island
- Payo Island
- Putic Island
- Quiniluban Island
- Quinimatin Island
- Quinimatin Chico Islands
- Round Island
- Silad Island
- Silat Island
- Siparay Island
- Tacbubuc Island
- Tagauayan Island
- Tatay Island
- Tinituan Island

=== Ilocos Region ===
- Alo Island
- Badoc Island
- Balaqui Island
- Cabalitian Island
- Cabarruyan Island
- Cangaluyan Island
- Comas Island
- Culebra Island
- Dos Hermanos Islands
- Hundred Islands
- Lagtaras Island
- Monroe Island
- Narra Island
- Pinget Island
- Poro Island
- Salomague Island
- Santiago Island
- Siapar Island
- Silaqui Island
- Tagaporo Island
- Tambac Island
- Tanduyong Island

=== Manila Bay islands ===
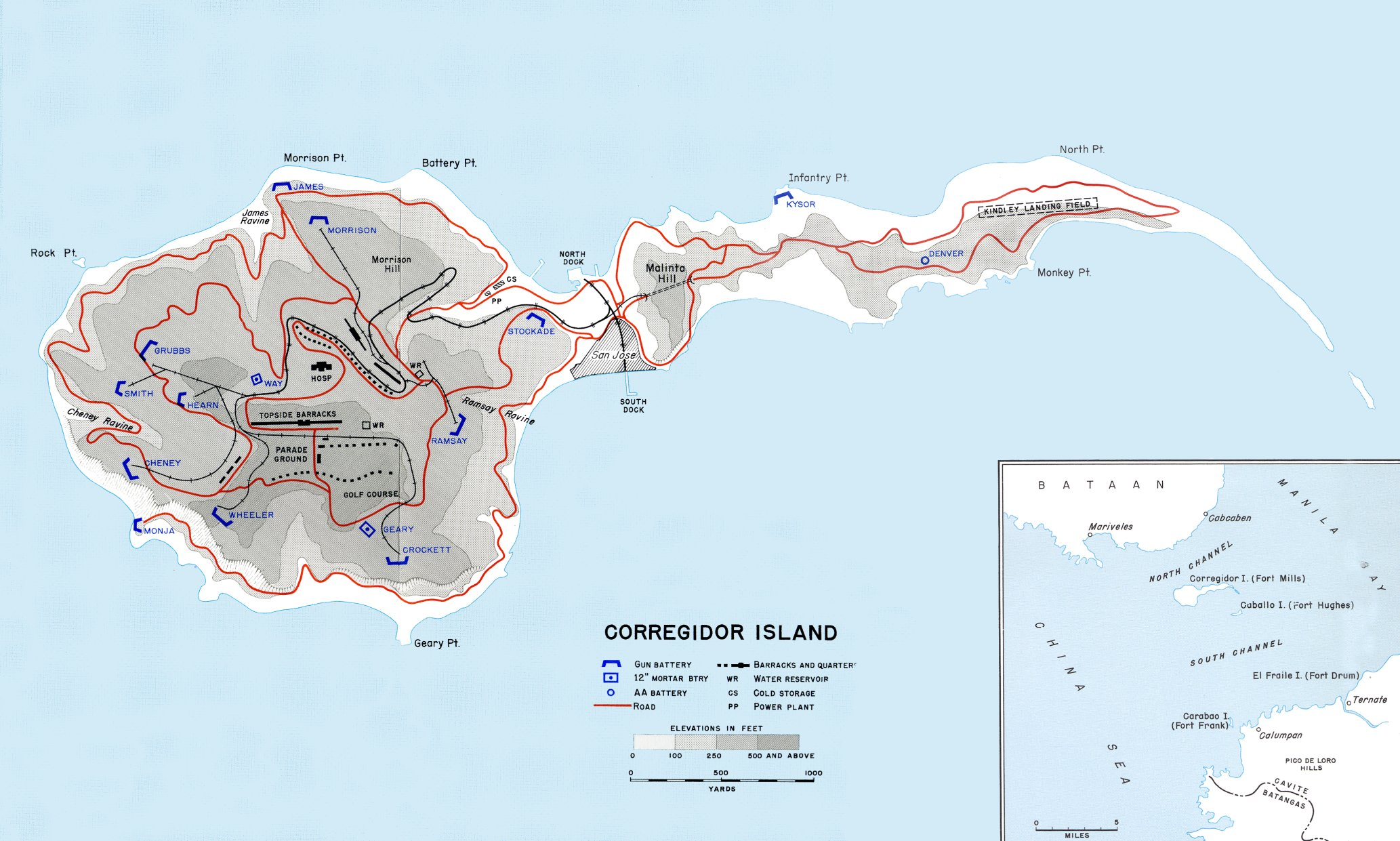
A 1941 map of Corregidor Island

- Binuangan Island
- Caballo Island
- Carabao Island
- Corregidor Island
- El Fraile Island
- La Monja Island
- Los Cochinos Islands
- Pugad Island
- Tubutubu Island

=== Marinduque ===
- Banot Island
- Elefante Island
- Hakupan Island
- Maniuaya Island
- Marinduque Island
- Mompog Island
- Salomaque Island
- San Andres Island
- Santa Cruz Island
- Tres Reyes Islands
  - Baltazar Island
  - Gaspar Island
  - Melchor Island

=== Masbate ===
- Arena Island
- Bagababoy Island
- Bagumbanua Island
- Balanguingue Island
- Bugtung Island
- Burias Island
- Busing Island
- Cagpating Island
- Camasusu Island
- Carogo Island
- Chico Island
- Daquit-Daquit Island
- Deagan Island
- Guilutugan Island
- Guinauayan Island
- Guinlabagan Island
- Guinluthagan Island
- Hamoraon Island
- Jintotolo Island
- Magcaraguet Island
- Majaba Island
- Manoc Island
- Masbate Island
- Matabao Island
- Naboctot Island
- Nabugtu Island
- Nagarao Island
- Nagurang Island
- Namatian Island
- Napayauan Island
- Naro Island
- Paltaban Island
- Peña Island
- Pobre Island
- Puting Island
- Sablayan Island
- San Miguel Island (Masbate)
- Sombreno Island
- Tanguingui Island
- Templo Island
- Ticao Island
- Tinalisayan Islets
- Tumalaytay Island
- Veagan Island

=== Metro Manila ===
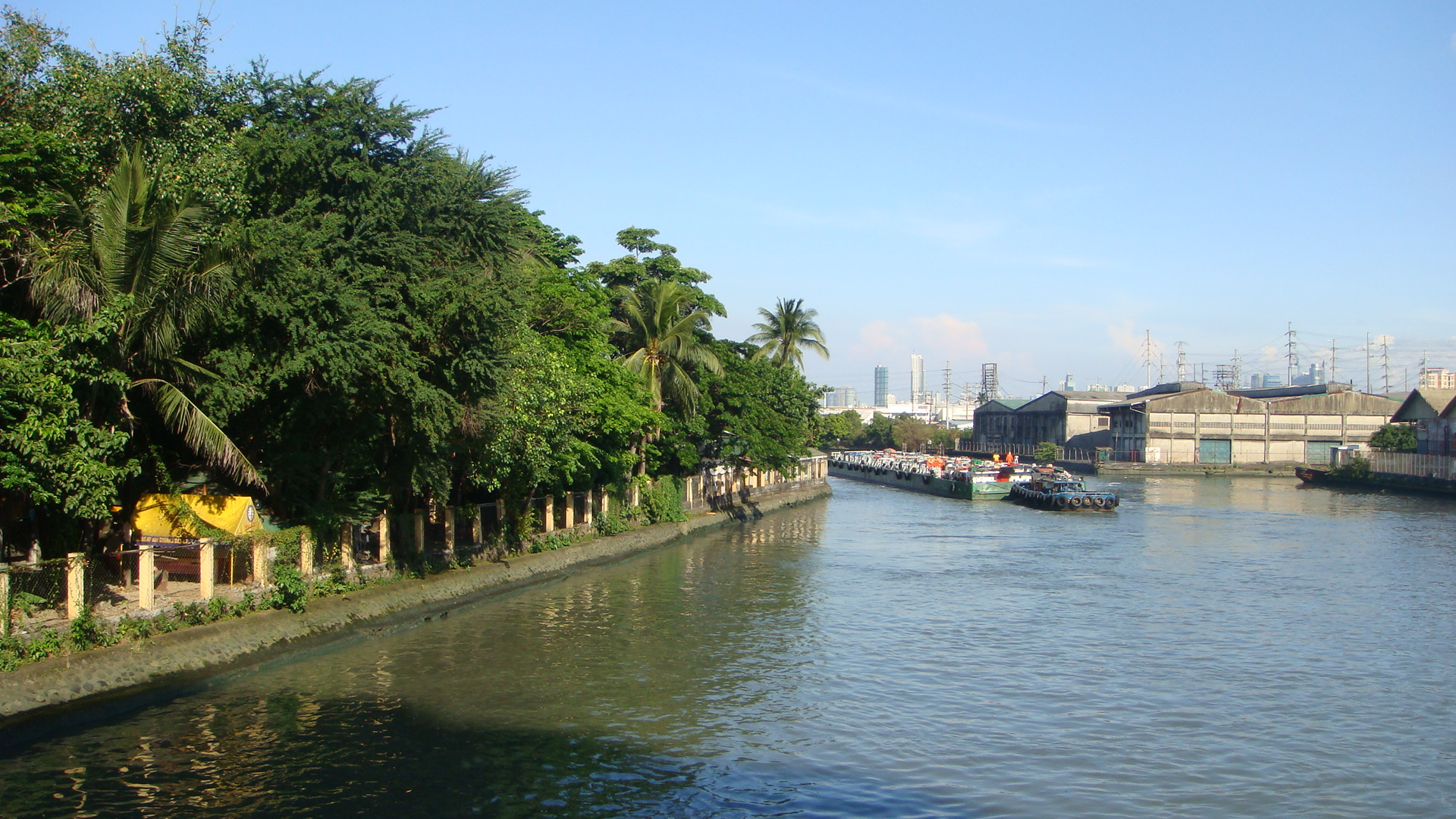
A view of the southern side of Isla de Convalecencia from the Ayala Bridge over the Pasig River

- Isla de Balut (Tondo)
- Isla de Convalecencia (San Miguel)
- Freedom Island (Parañaque) – man-made island
- Isla de Provisor (Paco)
- Isla Pulo (Navotas)
- Former islands
  - Isla de Binondo
  - Isla de Romero (Quiapo)
  - Isla de Tanduay (San Miguel)
  - Isla de Tanque (Paco)

=== Mindoro ===
- Ambil Island
- Ambulong Island
- Anaganahao Island
- Apo Island (Mindoro)
- Alibatan Island
- Aslom Island
- Baco Islands
  - Baco Grande Island
  - Baco Chico Island
- Binantgaan Island
- Boquete Island
- Buyayao Island
- Cabra Island
- Cayos del Bajo Island
- Garza Island
- Golo Island
- Ilin Island
- Libago Island
- Lubang Island
- Maasim Island
- Malavatuan Island
- Malaylay Island
- Manadi Island
- Mandaui Island
- Masin Island
- Medio Island (Mindoro)
- Menor Island (Mindoro)
- Mindoro Island
- North Pandan Island
- Opao Island
- Pambaron Island
- Paniguian Island
- Pocanol Island
- San Antonio Island
- Sibalat Island
- Silonay Island
- South Pandan Island
- Suguicay Island
- Tajud Island
- Talinas Island
- Tambaron Island
- White Island

=== Palawan ===
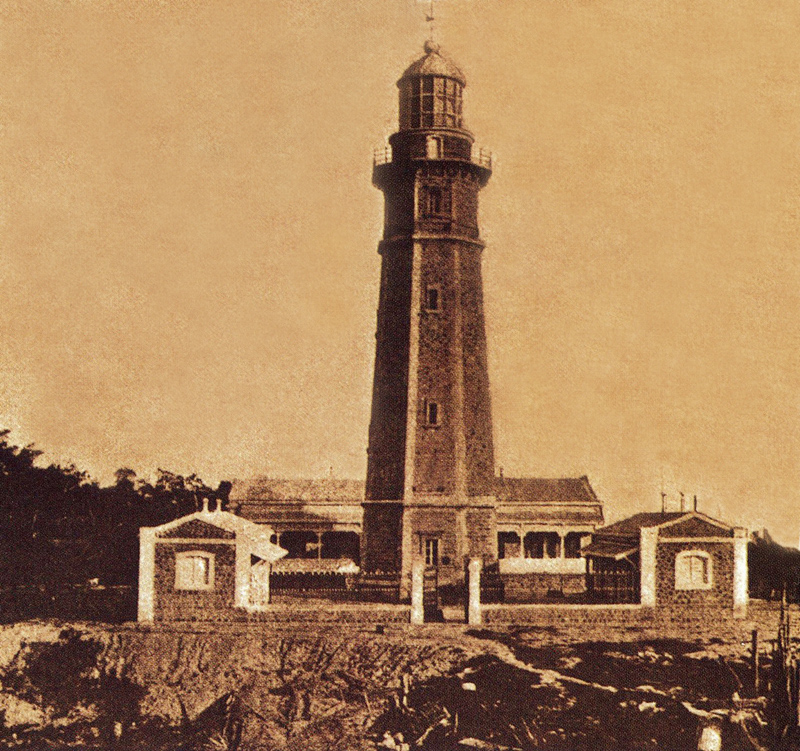
Cape Melville Lighthouse on the southern point of Balabac Island, circa 1892

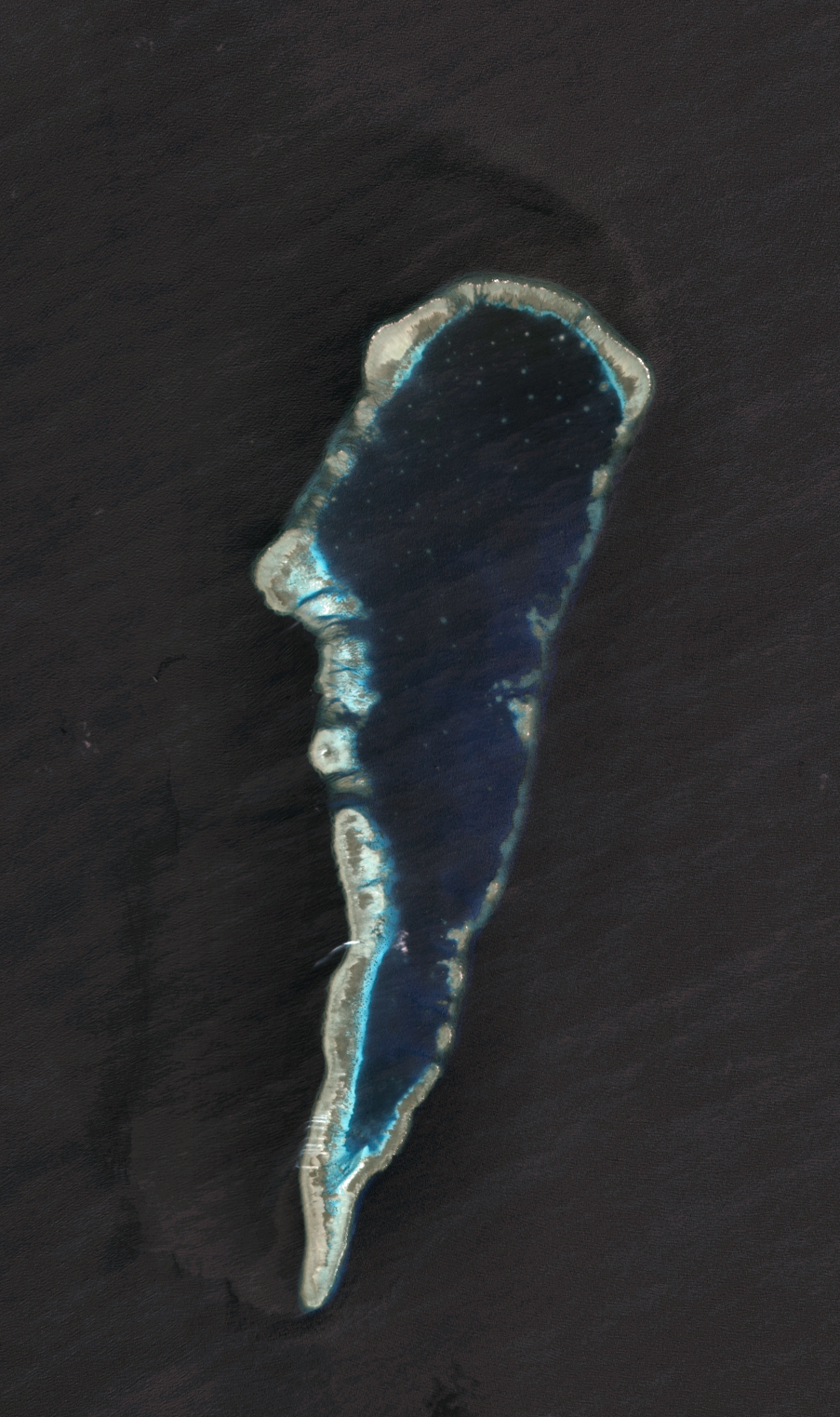
Satellite image of Second Thomas Shoal (Ayungin Shoal), an island of the Spratly Islands group in the South China Sea

- Albaguen Island
- Albay Island
- Anas Island
- Apo Island
- Apulit Island
- Arena Island
- Arrecife Island (Bataraza)
- Arrecife Island (Honda Bay)
- Bagambangan Island
- Baja Hanura Island
- Balabac Island
- Bancalan Island
- Bancauan Island
- Bancoran Island
- Bangawan Island
- Bangiluan Island
- Barangonan Island
- Batas Island
- Bessie Island
- Bibangan Island
- Binatican Island
- Binga Island
- Bintaugan Island
- Binulbulan Island
- Bird's Island
- Bivouac Island
- Boayan Island
- Bongot Island
- Boombong Island
- Bowen Island
- Bucid Island
- Bugsuk Island
- Buquias Island
- Bush Island (Palawan)
- Butacan Island
- Byan Island
- Cabugan Islands
- Cabuli Island
- Cacbolo Island
- Cacbucao Island
- Cacnipa Island
- Cagayancillo Island
- Cagdanao Island
- Cagsalay Island
- Cakisigan Island
- Calabadian Island
- Calabatuan Island
- Calabucay Island
- Calabugdong Island
- Calalong Island
- Calampuan Island
- Calandagan Island
- Cambari Island
- Canabungan Island
- Candaraman Island
- Canimeran Island
- Cañon Island
- Capsalon Island
- Capyas Island
- Casian Island
- Casirahan Island
- Castle Island
- Catalat Island
- Cauayan Island
- Cavili Island
- Cayoya Island
- Central Island
- Comiran Island
- Coral Island
- Cotad Island
- Dadaliten Island
- Dalahican Island
- Damad Island
- Daracotan Island
- Datag Islands
- Debangan Island
- Denanayan Island
- Deribongan Island
- Dinif Island
- Dinisonan Island
- Ditadita Island
- Ditnot Island
- Dondonay Island
- Double Island
- Dry Island
- Dumaran Island
- Elephant Island
- Emelina Island
- Flower Island
- Fondeado Island
- Fraser Island
- Gabung Island
- Gardiner Island
- Green Island
- Guindabdaban Island
- Hen and Chickens Island
- Howley Island
- Ibalaton Island
- Ibohor Island
- Ibulbol Island
- Icadambanauan Island
- Iloc Island
- Imorigue Island
- Imuruan Island
- Inamukan Island
- Inobian Island
- Inoladoan Island
- Johnson Island
- Josefa Island
- Kalayaan Islands or Spratly Islands (claimed by China, Taiwan, Malaysia, Brunei and Vietnam)
  - Bailan Island
  - Binago Island
  - Kota Island
  - Lagos Island
  - Lawak Island
  - Ligao Island
  - Likas Island
  - Pag-asa Island
  - Panata Island
  - Parola Island
  - Patag Island
  - Pugad Island
  - Rurok Island
- Kalungpang Island
- Kaoya Island
- Lampiligan Island
- Langisan Island
- Langoy Island
- Liabdan Island
- Linda Island
- Little Maosanon Island
- Lomalayang Island
- Luli Island
- Lumbucan Island
- Lump Island
- Maalaquequen Island
- Macuao Island
- Maducang Island
- Makesi Island
- Malaibo Island
- Malanao Island
- Malapackun Island
- Malapnia Island
- Malauton Island
- Malcorot Island
- Malinsono Island
- Malotamban Island
- Mangsee Island
- Mantangule Island
- Manuc Manucan Island
- Manucan Island
- Manulali Island
- Maobanen Island
- Maosanon Island
- Maqueriben Island
- Marantao Island
- Maraquit Island
- Maricaban Island
- Mariquit Island
- Maroday Island
- Mayabacan Island
- Mayakli Island
- Maybara Island
- Maylakan Island
- Maytiguid Island
- Meara Island
- Mialbok Island
- Nabat Island
- Nagulon Island
- Nasalet Island
- Nasubata Island
- Niaporay Island
- Nokoda Island
- North Channel Island
- North Islet (Tubbataha Reef)
- North Mangsee Island
- North Verde Island
- Notch Island
- Pabellon Islands
- Palawan Island
- Palm Island
- Paly Island
- Pamalatan Island
- Pandan Island
- Pandanan Island
- Pangisian Island
- Papagapa Island
- Parunponon Island
- Passage Island
- Patawan Island
- Patetan Island
- Patongong Island
- Peaked Island
- Pez Island
- Pirate Island
- Puerco Island
- Pulaw Talam Island
- Puntog Islands
- Quimbaludan Island
- Ramesamey Island
- Ramos Island
- Rangod Island
- Rasa Island
- Reinard Island
- Rinambacan Island
- Rita Island
- Rizal Pongtog Island
- Roughton Island
- Salingsingan Island
- San Miguel Islands
- Sanz Island
- Secam Island
- Segyam Islands
- Señorita Island
- Shell Island
- Silanga Islands
- Simizu Island
- Small Pagbo Island
- Sombrero Island
- South Island
- South Islet (Tubbataha Reef)
- South Mangsee Island
- South Verde Island
- Stanlake Island
- Suotiv Island
- Tagalinong Island
- Tagbulo Island
- Talacanen Island
- Tanusa Island
- Tarusan Islands
- Temple Island
- Tidepole Island
- Tomandang Island
- Tres Marias Islands
- Triple Cima Island
- Tubbataha Reef
- Tuluran Island
- Ursula Island
- Wedge Island
- White Island
- White Round Island

=== Polillo Islands ===
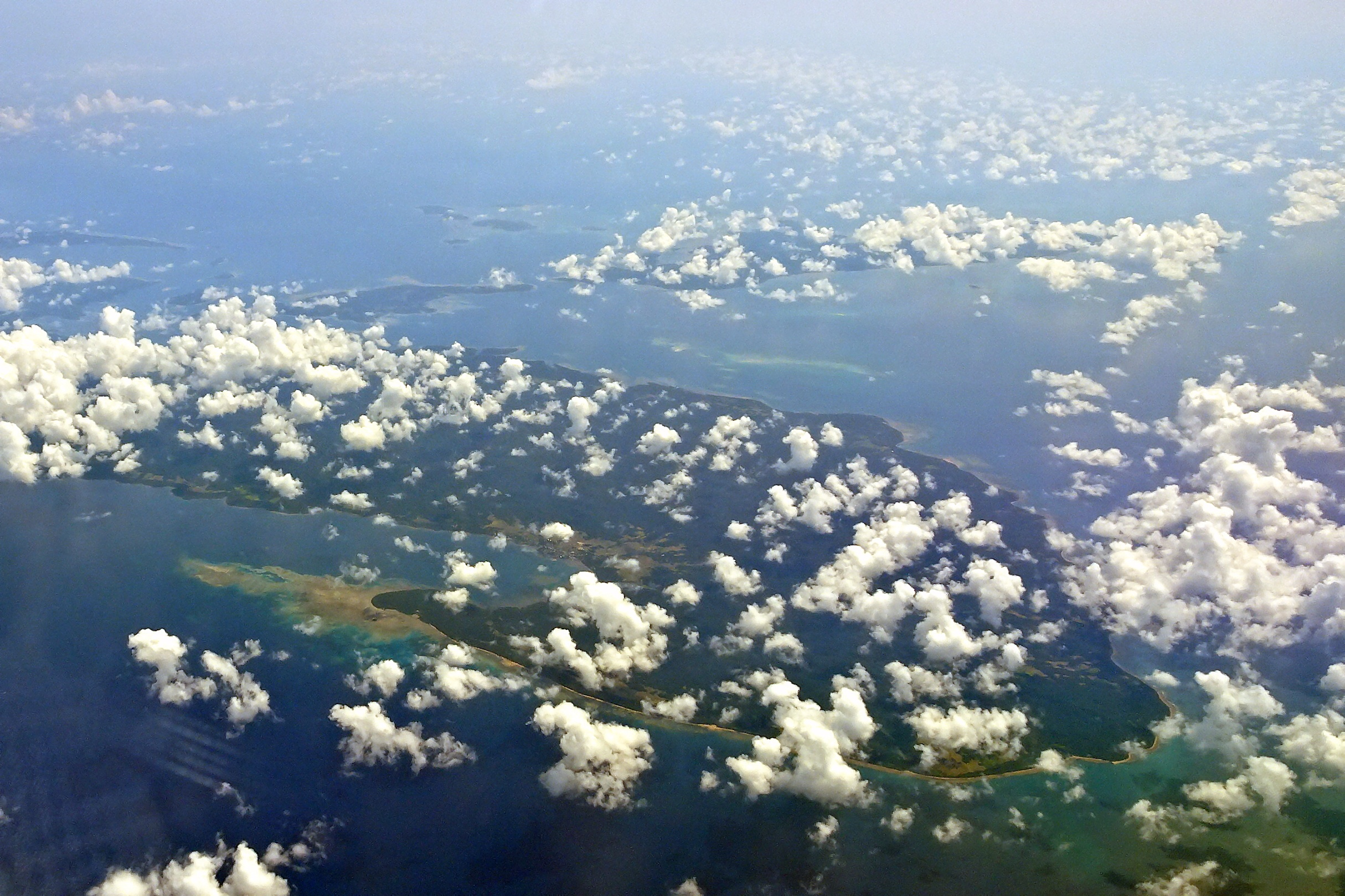
An aerial view of Polillo Island

- Anawan Island
- Anirong Island
- Balesin Island
- Buguitay Island
- Cabaloa Island
- Diligin Island
- East Ikikon Island
- Icol Island
- Ikikon Island
- Jomalig Island
- Kalongkooan Island
- Kalotkot Island
- Karlagan Island
- Katabunan Island
- Katakian Chica Island
- Katakian Grande Island
- Lantao Island
- Lumaya Island
- Malaguinoan Island
- Minamata Island
- Palasan Island
- Pandanan Island
- Patnanungan Island
- Pinaglonglogan Island
- Polillo Island
- San Rafael Island
- Uala Islands
- Usok Island

=== Romblon ===
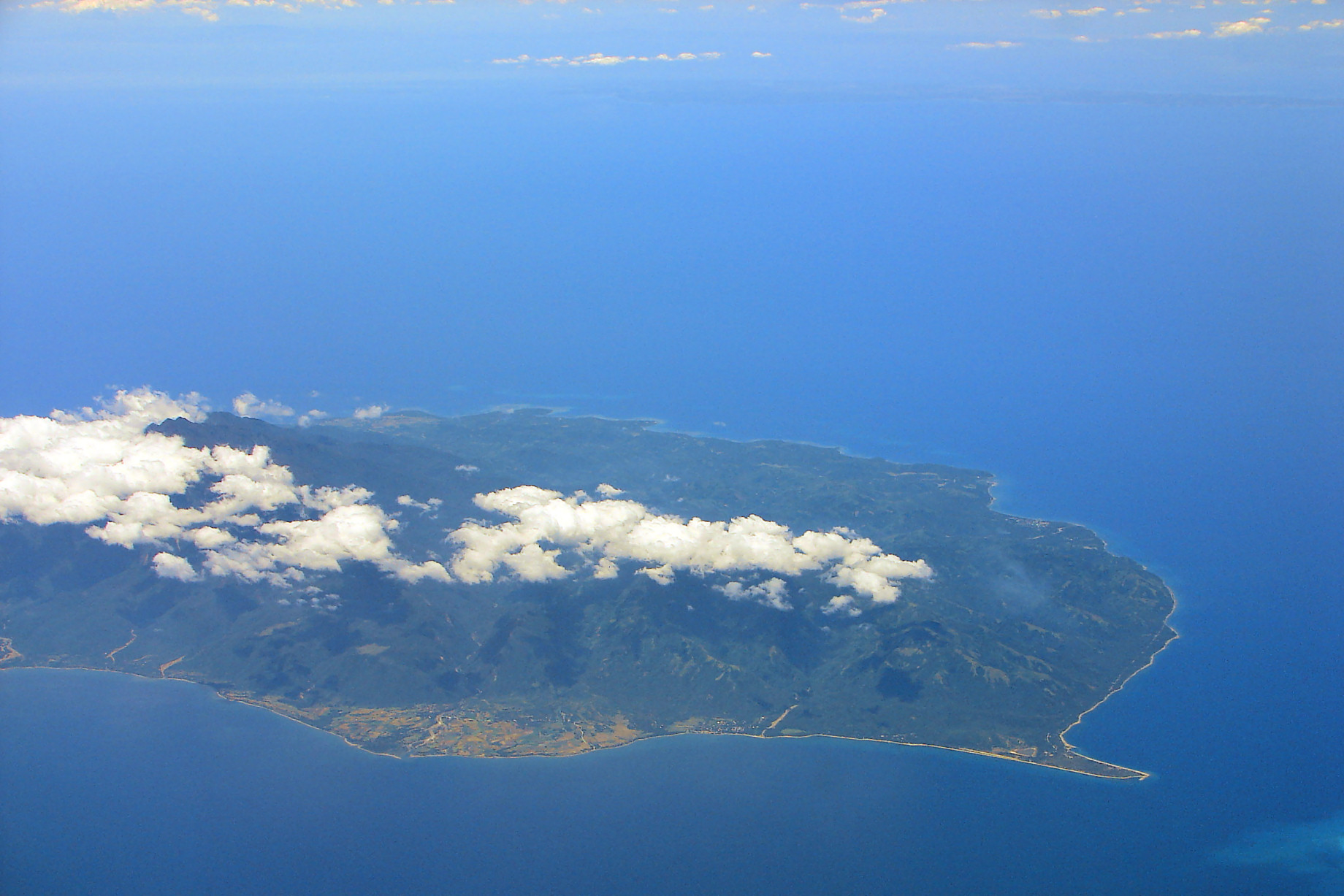
An aerial view of Sibuyan Island

- Agdapdap Islet
- Aguada Islet
- Alad Island
- Alfonso XIII (Molo) Island
- Aregita Islets
- Baboy-baboy Islets
- Bang-og Island
- Banton Island
- Bantoncillo Island
- Batacan Islet
- Biaringan Island
- Binucot Islet
- Cabahan Island
- Cabugaan Islets
- Carabao Island
- Carlota Island
- Cascaro Islets
- Cobrador Island
- Cresta de Gallo Island
- Gakot Island
- Guimpasilan Island
- Guindauahan ni Bendoy Island
- Guinhoan Islet
- Hinaguman Islet
- Inanayan Islet
- Isabel Island
- Lapus-lapus Islet
- Lictinon Island
- Loboton Islet
- Logbon Island
- Maestre de Campo (Sibale) Island
- Manamoc (Japar) Island
- Nabagbagan Islets
- Nilintian Islet
- Origon Islets
- Otod Islet
- Paksi Islet
- Pez Islet
- Polloc Island
- Prat Islets
- Puro Islet
- Ramiligan Island
- Romblon Island
- Sibuyan Island
- San Pedro Island
- Simara Island
- Tablas Island
- Tinang Islets
- Tinigban Islet
- Uyangon Islet

=== Southern Tagalog ===
- Alabat Island
- Alibijaban Island
- Anilon Island
- Apat Island
- Bakaw-Bakaw Island
- Balot Island
- Baluti Island
- Binombonan Island
- Bird Island
- Bonga Island
- Bonito Island
- Bubuin Island
- Burunggoy Island
- Caban Island
- Cagbalete Island
- Calamba Island
- Culebra Island
- Dalig Island
- Dampalitan Island
- Fortune Island
- Ikulong Island
- Isla Puting Bato Island
- Lagdauin Island
- Lambauing Island
- Ligpo Island
- Limbones Island
- Malahi Island
- Malajibomanoc Island
- Mangayao Island
- Manlanat Island
- Maricaban Island
- Napayong Island
- Pagbilao Chica Island
- Pagbilao Grande Island
- Palasan Island
- Patayan Island
- Santa Amalia Island
- Sombrero Island
- Talabaan Islands
- Talim Island
- Tingloy Island
- Twin Island
- Verde Island
- Volcano Island

== Mindanao ==
=== Caraga ===
- Agony Island (Surigao del Sur)
- Aling Island
- Amaga Island
- Arangasa Islands
- Ayninan Island
- Ayoki Island
- Bagasinan Island
- Banga Island
- Bayagnan Island
- Britania Island
- Cabgan Island (Surigao del Sur)
- Condona Island
- Gabao Islet
- General Island (Surigao del Norte)
- Hamuan Island
- Haycock Islands
- Hinatuan Island
- Jobo Island
- Kabo Island
- Lamagon Island
- Lapinigan Island
- Lenungao Islands
- Load Island
- Ludguran Island
- Maanoc Island
- Mahaba Island (Surigao del Norte)
- Mahaba Island (Surigao del Sur)
- Majangit Island
- Mancahoram Island
- Mancangangi Island
- Maopia Island
- Maowa Island
- Masapelid Island
- Mawes Island
- Nagubat Island
- Panirongan Island
- Puyo Island
- Singag Island
- Sugbu Island
- Taganongan Island
- Talavera Island
- Tigdos Island
- Tinago Island (Surigao del Norte)
- Unamao Island

=== Central Mindanao ===
- Alidama Island
- Balot Island
- Balutmato Island
- Bongo Island
- Donayang Island
- East Balut Island
- Ibus Island
- Limbayan Island
- Sarampungan Island
- Tagatungan Island
- Taytayan Island
- West Balut Island
- Balaysan Island

=== Davao Region ===
- Balut Island
- Big Cruz Island
- Buenavista Island
- Bugoso Island
- Cabugao Island
- Dumalag Island
- Ivy Island
- Kopia Island
- Little Cruz Island
- Luban Island
- Malipano Island
- Manamil Island
- Mangrove Island
- Oak Island
- Olanivan Island
- Pandasan Island
- Pujada Island
- Quinablongan Island
- Samal Island
- San Victor Island
- Sarangani Island
- Sigaboy Island
- Talicud Island
- Uanivan Island

=== Dinagat Islands ===
- Awasan Island
- Capiquian Island
- Danaon Island
- Dinagat Island
- Doot Island
- East Caliban Island
- Hagaknab Island
- Hanigad Island
- Hibuson Island
- Hikdop Island
- Kanhanusa Island
- Kanihaan Island
- Kayabangan Island
- Kayosa Island
- Kotkot Island
- Little Hibuson Island
- Nonoc Island
- Pangabangan Island
- Puyo Island (Dinagat)
- Rasa Island
- Sayao Island
- Sibale Island (Dinagat)
- Sibanac Island
- Sibanoc Island
- Sumilon Island (Dinagat)
- Tabuk Island
- Unib Island
- West Caliban Island

=== Northern Mindanao ===
- Agutayan Island
- Bao-Baon Islands
- Cabgan Island
- Camiguin Island
- Capayas Island
- Dolphin Island
- Maburos Island
- Mantigue Island
- Naputhaw Island
- Silanga Island
- White Island

=== Siargao ===
- Abanay Island
- Anahawan Island
- Antokon Island
- Bancuyo Island
- Bucas Grande Island
- Cambiling Island
- Casalian Island
- Cawhagan Island
- Corregidor Island
- Daku Island
- East Bucas Island
- Guyam Island
- Halian Island
- Kangbangio Island
- Kangnun Island
- Kaob Island
- Lajanosa Island
- Laonan Island
- Mamon Island
- Megancub Island
- Middle Bucas Island
- Pagbasoyan Island
- Pansukian Island
- Poneas Island
- Siargao Island
- Tona Island

=== Sulu Archipelago ===
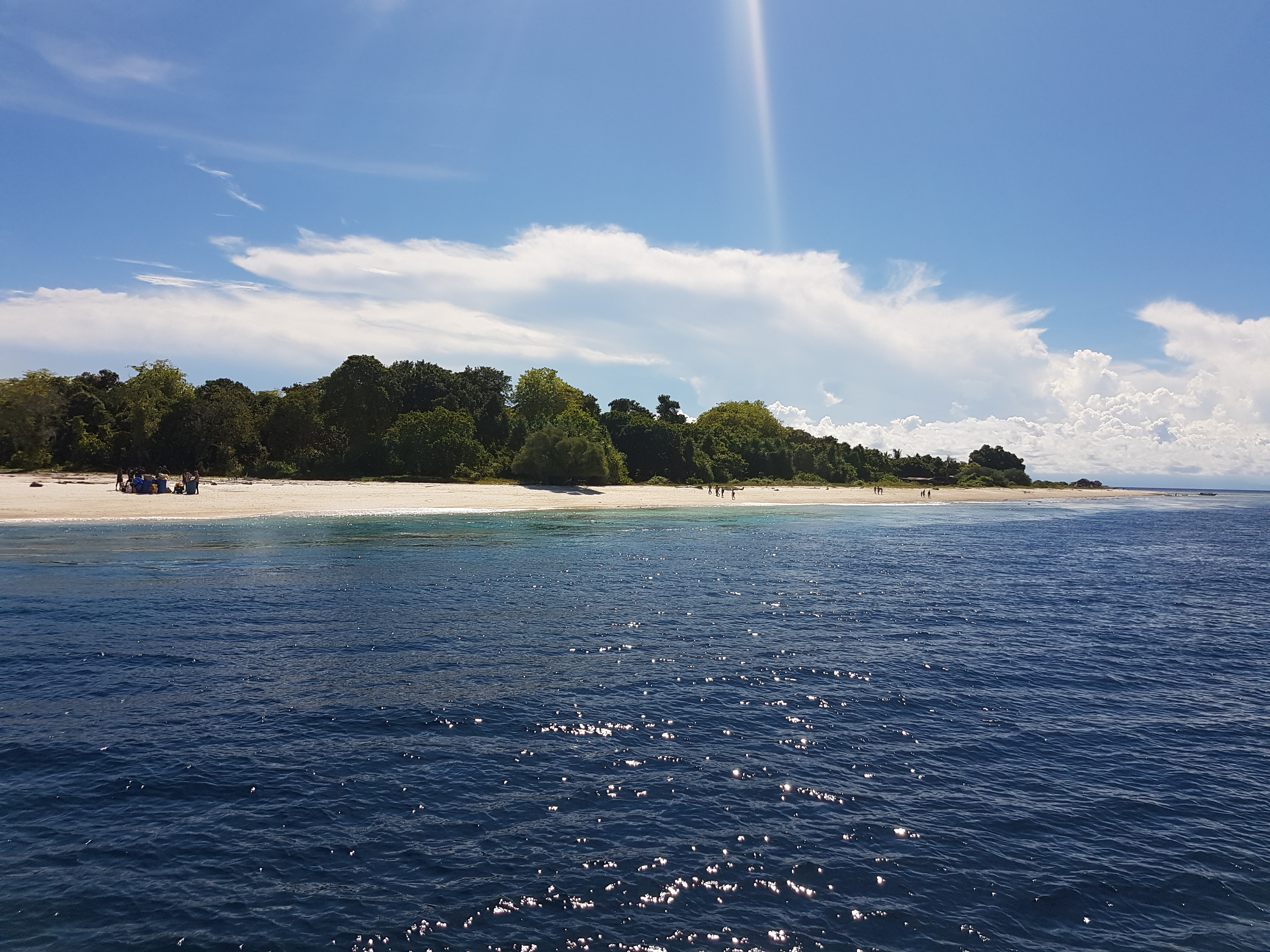
Panguan Island, The last island of the Sulu Archipelago nearest the Philippine-Malaysian border

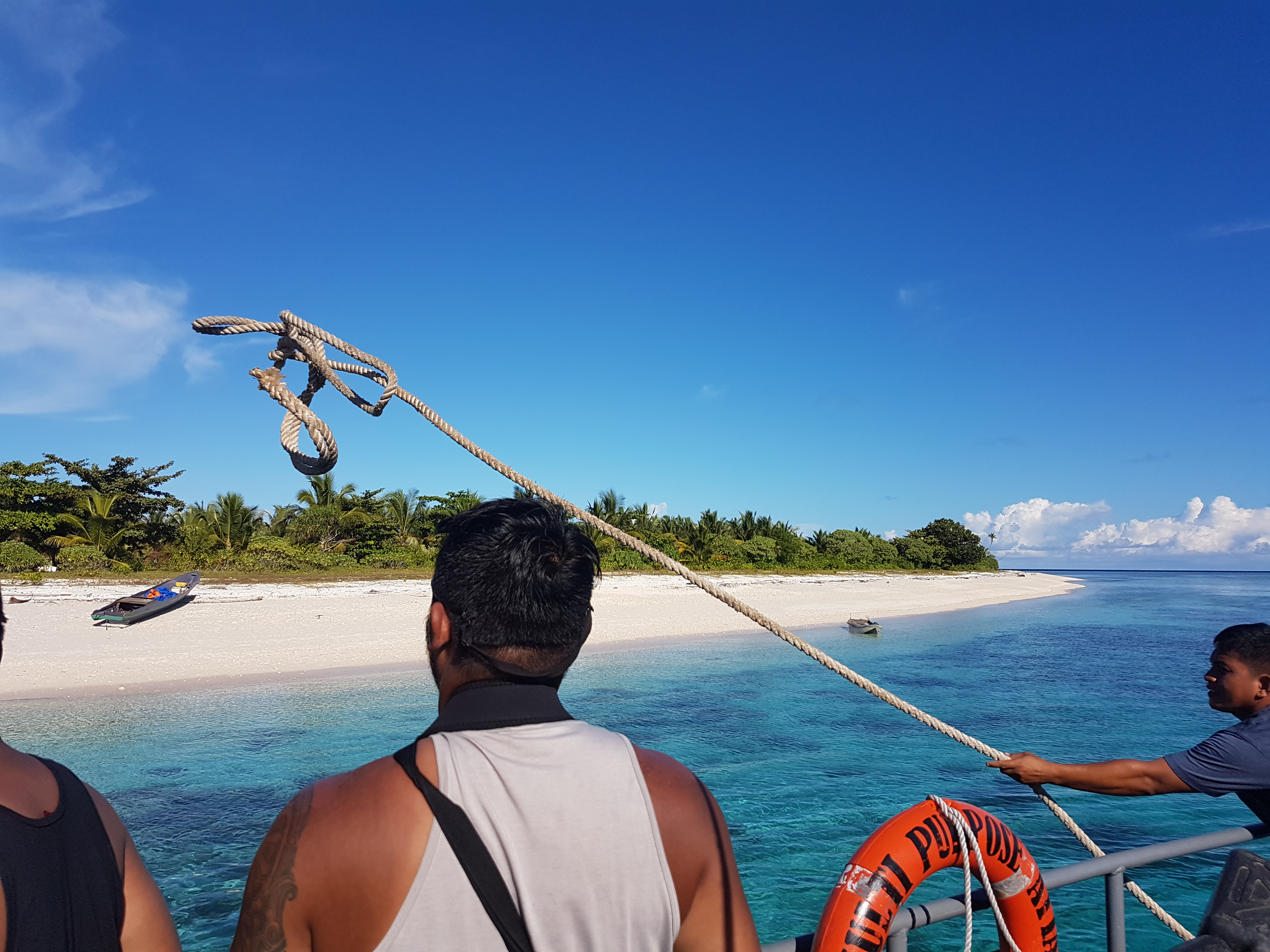
Mardanas Island, officially known as Siluag

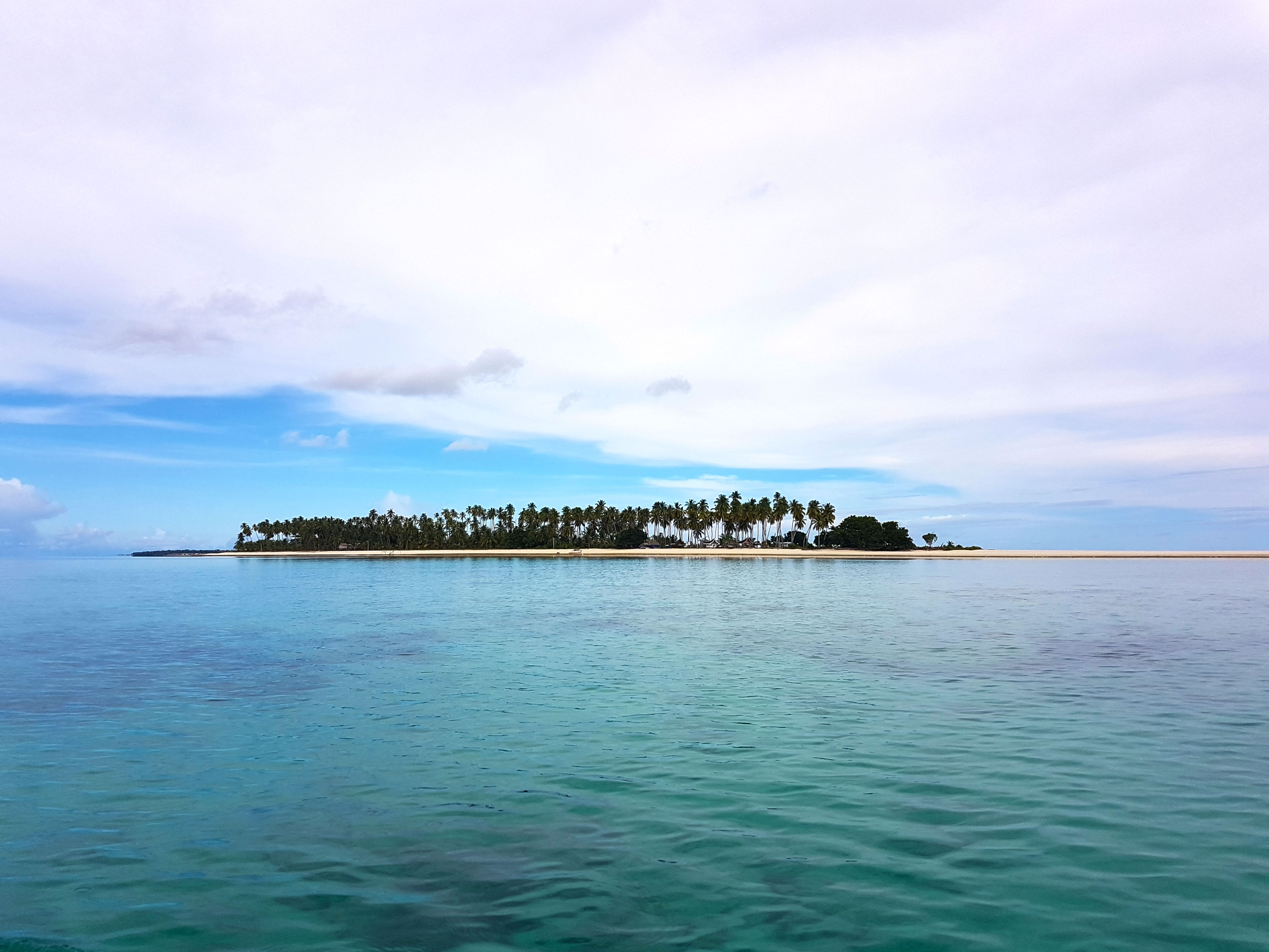
Panampangan Island, The island with the longest sandbar in the Philippines

- Andulinang Island
- Babuan Island
- Baguan Island
- Balanguingui
- Baliungan Island
- Balukbaluk Island
- Bambanan Island
- Banaran Island
- Bangalao Island
- Bankungan Island
- Basbas Island
- Basibuli Islands
- Basilan Island
- Batalinos Islands
- Baturapac Island
- Bauang Diki Island
- Bihintinusa Island
- Bilangan Island
- Bilatan Island
- Bintoulan Island
- Bintut Island
- Bitinan Island
- Boaan Island
- Bohan Island
- Bongao Island
- Buan Island
- Bubuan Island
- Bucutua Island
- Bulan Island
- Buli Nusa Islet
- Buliculul Island
- Bulicutin Island
- Bulisuan Island
- Buluan Island
- Bulubulu Islet
- Bunabunaan Island
- Bungbunan Island
- Bunotpasil Island
- Cabingaan Island
- Cabucan Island
- Cacatan Island
- Cagayan de Sulu Island
- Calaitan Islets
- Calupag Island
- Camabalan Island
- Canas Island
- Cancuman Island
- Cap Island
- Capual Island
- Celandat Islets
- Coco Island
- Cujangan Island
- Cunilan Island
- Dakule Island
- Dalauan
- Dammai Island
- Dasaan Islands
- Dasalan Island
- Datubato Islands
- Dawata Island
- Dawildawil Island
- Deatobato Island
- Dipolod Island
- Doc Can Island
- Dongdong Island
- Dundangon Island
- East Bolod Island
- Gaiya Island
- Gal-loman Island
- Gondra Island
- Goreno Island
- Great Bakungaan Island
- Great Gounan Island
- Guimba Island
- Gujangan Island
- Haluluko Island
- Hegad Island
- Hole Island
- Jinhling Island
- Jolo Island
- Kabancauan Island
- Kaludlud Island
- Kaluitan Island
- Kamawi Island
- Kang Tipayan Dakula Island
- Kang Tipayan Diki Island
- Kauluan Island
- Kinapusan Island
- Kulassein Island
- Laa Island
- Lahangon Island
- Lahatlahat Island
- Lahatlahat Islands
- Lakit Island
- Laminusa Island
- Lampinigan Island
- Langaan Island
- Langas Island
- Lanhil Island
- Lapac Island
- Laparan Island
- Latuan Island
- Lawayan Island
- Lemondo Island
- Liaburan Island
- Lihiman Island
- Linawan Island
- Little Coco Island
- Little Dipolod Island
- Loran Island
- Lubucan Island
- Lugus Island
- Lumbian Island
- Lupa Island
- Magados Island
- Magpeos Island
- Malamawi Island
- Malicut Island
- Mamad Island
- Mamanak Island
- Mamanoc Island
- Mamanuc Island
- Mambahenauhan Island
- Manangal Island
- Manate Island
- Mandah Island
- Maniacolat Island
- Mantabuan Island
- Manubul Island
- Manuk Manka Island
- Manungut Island
- Maranas Island
- Marungas Island
- Mataja Island
- Minis Island
- Muligi Islands
- Nancan Island
- North Ubian Island
- Nusa Buani Island
- Nusa Islands
- Omapoy Island
- Orell Island
- Pahumaan Island
- Palajangan Island
- Pamelican Island
- Pamisaan Island
- Panampangan Island
- Pandak Island
- Pandalan Island
- Pandanan Island
- Pandami Island
- Pandugas Island
- Pangana Paturuan Island
- Panganap Island
- Pangas Island
- Pangasahan Island
- Pangasinan Island
- Pangutaran Islet
- Pantocunan Island
- Papahag Island
- Paquia Island
- Parangan Island
- Paral Island
- Pasigpasilan Island
- Pata Island
- Patian Island
- Perangan Island
- Pilas Island
- Pintado Island
- Pulau Billean Island
- Pulau Lankayan Island
- Punungan Islet
- Salaro Island
- Saluag Island
- Salkulakit Island
- Saluping Island
- Sanga-Sanga Island
- Sangasiapu Island
- Sangboy Islands
- Sarucsarucan Island
- Sasa Island
- Secubun Island
- Siasi Island
- Sibago Island
- Sibakel Island
- Sibijindacula Island
- Sibutu Island
- Sicagot Island
- Sicalangcalong Island
- Sicolan Islet
- Silumisan Island
- Siluag Island
- Simanayo Island
- Simbay Island
- Simisa Island
- Simunul Island
- Singaan Island
- Sipangkot Island
- Sipayu Island
- Sipungot Island
- Siringo Island
- Sirun Island
- Sitangkai Island
- Situgal Hea Island
- South Ubian Island
- Sucoligao Island
- Sugbai Island
- Suka Suka Dakula Islet
- Sulade Island
- Sumbasumba Island
- Suucan Island
- Taala Island
- Tabawan Island
- Tabolongan Island
- Tabuan Islands
- Taganak Island
- Tagao Island
- Tagutu Island
- Taitagan Island
- Taja Island
- Takela Island
- Takipamasilaan Island
- Talonpisa Island
- Taluc Island
- Talungan Island
- Tambilunay Island
- Tambulian Island
- Tamuk Island
- Tancan Island
- Tancolaluan Island
- Tandubas Island
- Tandubatu Island
- Tandungan Island
- Tanduowak Island
- Tapaan Island
- Tapiantana Island
- Tapul Island
- Tara Island
- Tataan Islands
- Tatalan Island
- Tatik Island
- Tauitaui Island
- Tawitawi Island
- Teinga Island
- Tengolan Island
- Teomabal Island
- Ticul Island
- Tiguilabun Island
- Tihik Tihik Island
- Tijitiji Islands
- Tinundukan Island
- Tinutungan Island
- Tongquil Island
- Tonkian Islands
- Tubalubac Island
- Tubigan Island
- Tulayan Island
- Tulian Island
- Tumbagaan Island
- Tumindao Island
- Tunbaunan Island
- Tungbukan Island
- Turtle Islands
- Tusan Bongao Island
- Tutu Kipa Island
- Ultra Island
- Usada Island
- West Bolod Island
- Zau Island

=== Zamboanga Peninsula ===
- Aliguay Island
- Bagiyas Island
- Balabac Island
- Bangaan Island
- Baong Island
- Bayangan Island
- Bibaya Island
- Bobo Island
- Buguias Island
- Buloan Island
- Caboc Island
- Cabog Island
- Cabut Island
- Cambugan Island
- Condulingan Island
- Dao-Dao Islands
- Gatusan Island
- Great Santa Cruz Island
- Igat Island
- Kabungan Island
- Lambang Island
- Lampinigan Island
- Lamuyong Island
- Lapinigan Islands
- Latas Island
- Letayon Island
- Lipari Island
- Little Malanipa Island
- Little Santa Cruz Island
- Lungui Island
- Lutangan Island
- Maculay Island
- Malanipa Island
- Murcielagos Island
- Nipa Nipa Islands
- Olutanga Island
- Pandalusan Island
- Panikian Island
- Paraitan Island
- Pina Island
- Pinya Island
- Piñahun Island
- Pisan Island
- Pitas Island
- Puli Puli Island
- Putili Island
- Sacol Island
- Sagayaran Island
- Salangan Island
- Selinog Island
- Sibulan Islands
- Simoadang Island
- Sirumon Island
- Ticala Islands
- Tictauan Island
- Tigabon Island
- Tigbauan Island
- Tigburacao Island
- Triton Island - Zamboanga
- Tugsocan Island
- Tumalutab Island
- Visa Island
- Vitali Island

== Visayas ==
=== Biliran ===
- Calutan Island
- Capiñahan Island
- Caygan Island
- Dalutan Island
- Ginuroan Island
- Higatangan Island
- Maripipi Island
- Sambawan Island
- Tagampol Islet
- Tingkasan Islet

=== Bohol ===
- Bagongbanwa Island
- Balicasag Island
- Banacon Island
- Banbanon Island
- Bansalan Island
- Bantigue Island
- Batasan Island
- Bilangbilangan Island
- Bonoon Island
- Budlaan Island
- Butan Island
- Bugatusan Island
- Cabantulan Island
- Cabgan Island (Bohol)
- Cabilao Island
- Cabul-an Big Island
- Cabul-an Small Island
- Cabasihan Small Island
- Calituban Island
- Calanggaman Island
- Cancostino Island
- Cataban Island
- Catang Island
- Catiil Island
- Cauayan Island
- Cuaming Island
- Cuaming II Island
- Del Mar Island
- Gak-ang Island
- Gaus Island
- Guindacpan Island
- Handayan Island
- Hambongan Big Island
- Hayaan Island
- Hingotanan Island
- Inanoran Island
- Jao Island
- Juagdan Island
- Lapinig Island
- Lapinig Chico Island
- Lumayag Island
- Lumislis Island
- Ma-agpit Island
- Mahaba Island
- Mahanay Island
- Malingin Island
- Mantatao Island
- Maumauan Island
- Mocaboc Island
- Nasingin Island
- Nocnocan Island
- Pandanon Island
- Pamasalon Island
- Pamasaun Island
- Pamilacan Island
- Panga Island
- Pangangan Island
- Pangapasan Island
- Panglao Island
- Puntod Island
- Puntod Guindacpan Island
- Saae Island
- Sag Island
- Sagasa Island
- Sandingan Island
- Sib Island
- Silo Island
- Tabangdio Island
- Tabaon Island
- Tambu Island
- Tangaon Island
- Tilmubo Island
- Tintiman Island
- Tres Reyes Island
- Ubay Island
- Villalimpia Island
- Virgin Island

=== Cebu ===
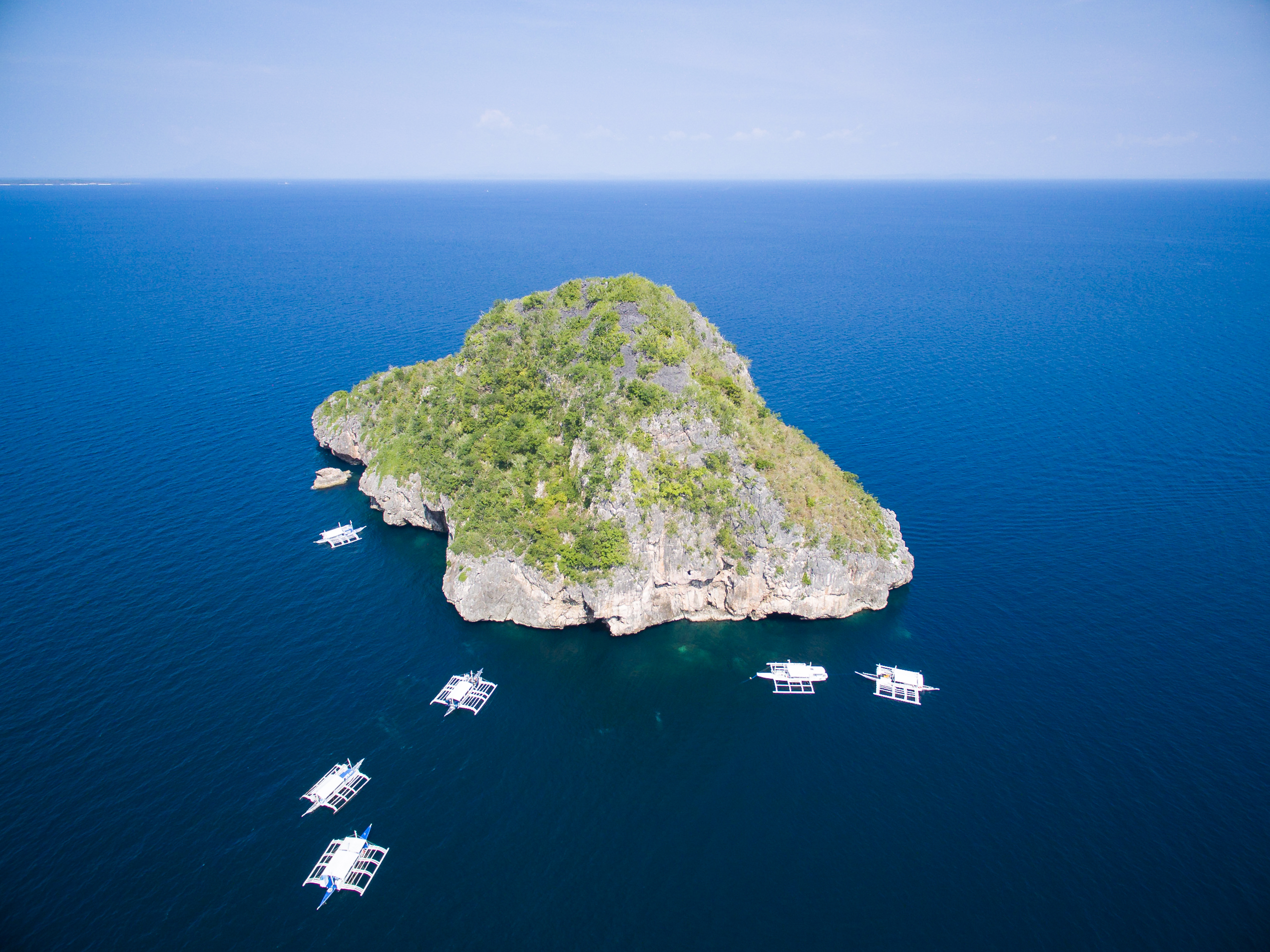
An aerial view of Gato Island

- Bantayan Island

- Biyagayag Islands (Daku and Diot)
- Botique Island (or Botigues, Batquis)
- Botong Island
- Doong Island
- Hilutungan Island (or Hilotongan, Lutungan)
- Hilantagaan Island (or Jicantangan, Cabalauan)
- Lipayran Island
- Moambuc Island (or Maamboc, Moamboc, Kangka Abong, Cangcabong)
- Mambacayao Island (or Mambacayao Daku)
- Mambacayao Gamay Island
- Panitugan Island (or Banitugan)
- Patao Island (or Polopolo)
- Panangatang Island (or Pintagan)
- Sagasay Islands (or Sagasa, Tagasa)
- Silagon Island
- Hilantagaan Diot (or Silion, Pulo Diyot (little island))
- Yao Islet (or Mambacayao Diot)

- Calamangan Island
- Camotes Islands
  - Pacijan Island
  - Ponson Island
  - Poro Island
  - Tulang Island
- Capitancillo Island
- Carnaza Island
- Chocolate Island (Cebu)
- Dakit-Dakit Island
- Gapas-Gapas Island
- Gato Island
- Guintacan Island
- Jibitnil Island
- Mactan Island
- Malapascua Island
- Maria Island (Cebu)
- Olango Island
  - Camungi Island
  - Caohagan Island
  - Caubian Daku Island
  - Caubian Gamay Island
  - Gilutongan Island
  - Nalusuan Island
  - Pangan-an Island
  - Sulpa Island
- Pescador Island
- Sumilon Island
- Zaragoza Island

Former islands

- Cauit Island

=== Guimaras ===
- Ave Maria Island
- Guiuanon Island
- Inampulugan Island
- Malingin Island
- Nabural Island
- Naburot Island
- Nadulao Island
- Nagarao Island
- Nalibas Island
- Natunga Island
- Nauai Island
- Panubulon Island
- Seraray Island
- Taklong Island
- Tandog Island
- Unisan Island
- Yeto Island

=== Leyte ===
- Bacol Island
- Badian Island
- Cabgan Island (Leyte)
- Calaguan Island
- Kalanggaman Island
- Caltagan Island
- Calumpijan Island
- Canigao Island
- Cuatro Islas
  - Apid Island
  - Digyo Island
  - Himokilan Island
  - Mahaba Island
- Cumaiac Island
- Dabun Island
- Danajon Islet
- Gatighan Island
- Gigatangan Island
- Gumalac Island
- Limasawa Island
- Nabubuy Island
- Panaon Island
- San Pablo Island (Leyte)
- San Pedro Island (Leyte)
- Taboc Island
- Zapatos Island

=== Negros Island ===
- Agutayan Island
- Anajauan Island
- Apo Island
- Bulata Island
- Danjugan Island
- Diutay Island
- Jomabo Island
- Lakawon Island
- Molocaboc Island
- Olympia Island
- Sipaway (Refugio) Island
- Siquijor Island
- Suyaan Island
- Talabong Island

=== Panay ===
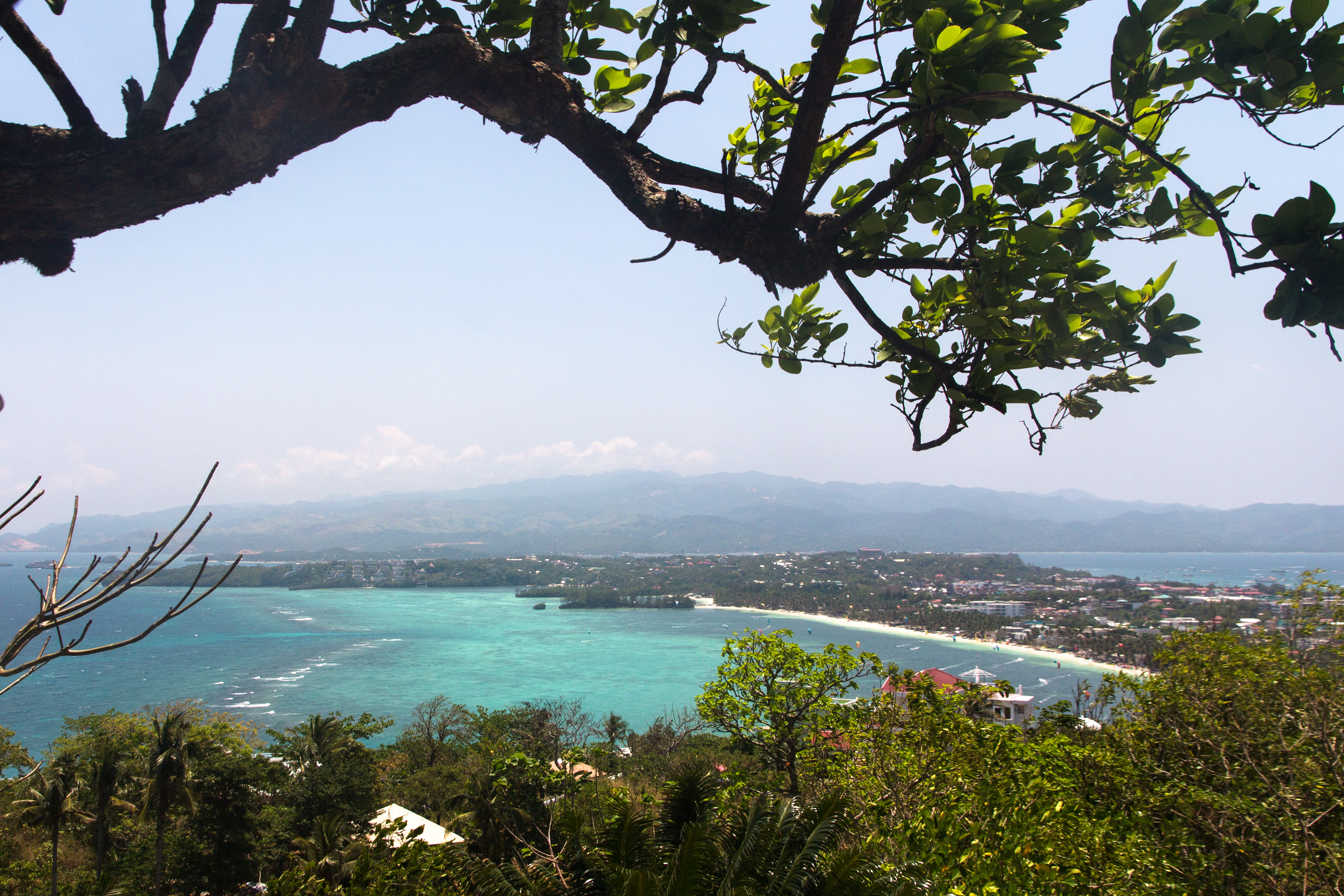
Panoramic view of Boracay

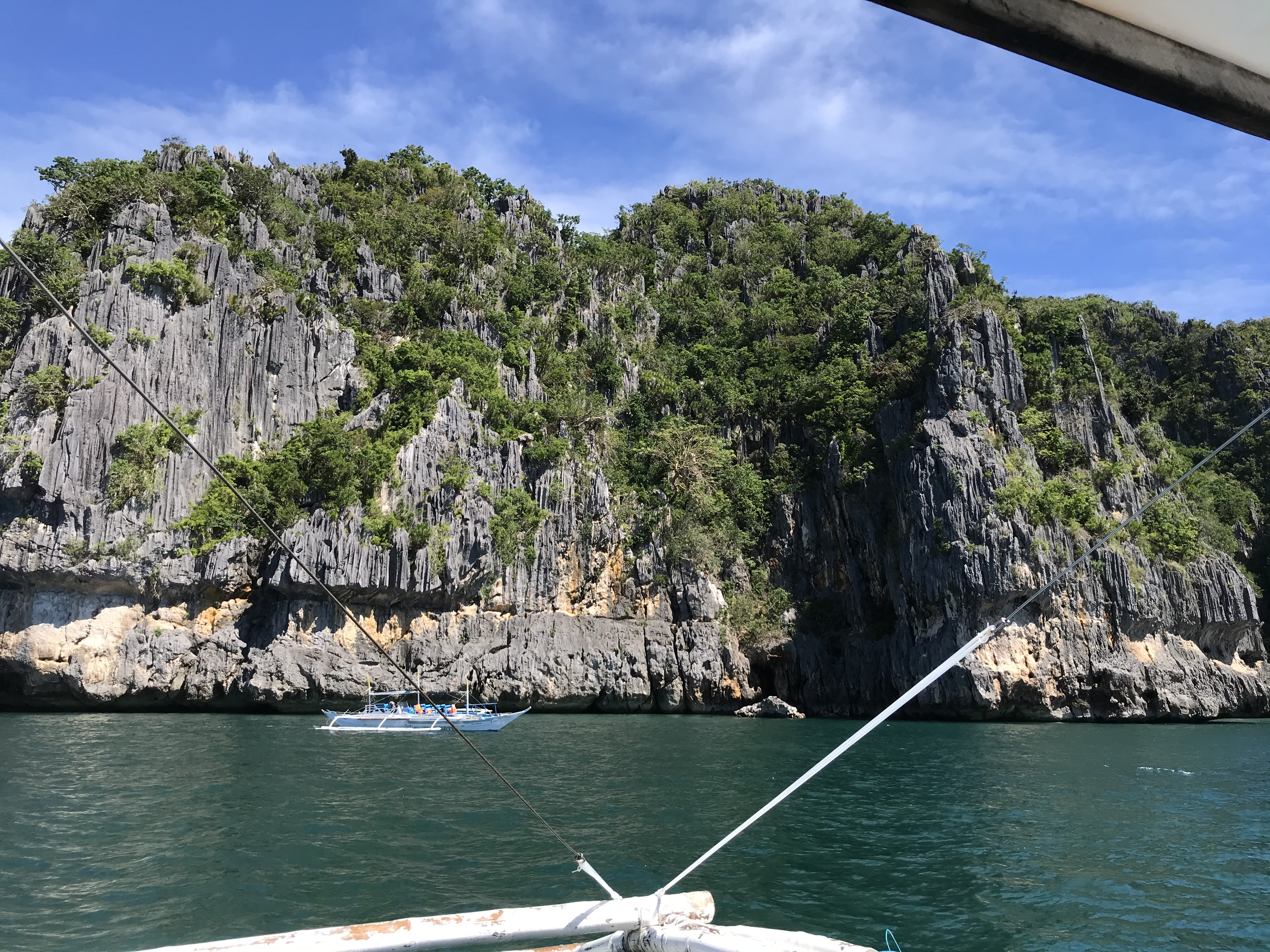
Gigantes Sur Island, part of the Gigantes Islands

- Adcalayo Island
- Balbagon Island
- Batbatan Island
- Bayas Islets
  - Bayas Island
  - Manipulon Islet
  - Magosipal Islet
  - Pangalan Islet
- Binuluangan Island
- Bogtongan Islands
- Boracay Island
- Buri Island
- Calabazas Island
- Calagnaan Island
- Caluya Island
- Canas Island
- Chinela Island
- Concepcion Islands
  - Agho Island
  - Anauayan Island
  - Bag-o Abo Island
  - Bag-o Isi Island
  - Baliguian Island
  - Bocot Island
  - Botlog Island
  - Bulubadiangan Island
  - Chico Island
  - Colebra Island
  - Danao-Danao Island
  - Igbon Island
  - Malangabang Island
  - Pan de Azucar Island
  - Sombrero Island
  - Tago Island
  - Tagubanhan Island
- Crocodile Island
- Dunao Island
- Gigantes Islands
  - Antonia Island
  - Bantigui Island
  - Bulubadiang Islet
  - Cabugao Island
  - Gigantes Norte
  - Gigantes Sur
  - Gigantillo Islet
  - Gigantuna Islet
  - Tanguingui Island
  - Turnina Islet
- Himamylan Island
- Juraojurao Island
- Lacdian Island
- Laurel Island
- Libagao Island
- Loguingot Island
- Mabay Island
- Magaisi Island
- Magalumbi Island
- Maliaya Island
- Manigonigo Island
- Maniguin Island
- Manlot Island
- Mararison Island
- Marbuena Island
- Matagda Island
- Nagarao Island
- Naburot Island
- Nagubat Island
- Nasidman Island
- Natig Island
- Nilidlaran Island
- Nogas Island
- Ojastras Island
- Olotayan Island
- Panagatan Malaqui Island
- Pandan Island
- Pinamucan Island
- Pulo Piña Island
- Salog Island
- Semirara Island
- Sibalon Island
- Sibato Island
- Sibay Island
- Sibolon Island
- Sicogon Island
- Seco Island
- Tabon Island
- Tabugon Island
- Tabugon Chico Islet
- Tinguiban Islet
- Tulunanaun Island
- Tumaguin Island
- Zapato Island
- Zapato Menor Island

=== Samar ===
- Aguada Island
- Almagro Island
- Anahao Island
- Anajao Island
- Andis Island
- Aocon Island
- Apiton Island
- Badian Island
- Balinatio Island
- Bangon Island
- Bani Island
- Bar Islet (Samar)
- Bascal Island
- Bascal-Agotay Island
- Basiao Island
- Batag Island
- Batgongon Island
- Baul Island
- Binaliw Islet
- Binay Island
- Biri Island
- Boloan Island
- Botig Island
- Buad Island
- Buri Island
- Cabaongon Island
- Cagduyong Island
- Cahayagan Island
- Calapan Island
- Calicoan Island
- Camandag Island
- Cambaye Island
- Canahauan Dacu Island
- Canahauan Guti Island
- Candule Island
- Caparangasan Island
- Capogpocanan Island
- Capul Island
- Catalaban Island
- Cauhagan Island
- Coconut Island
- Dabong Island
- Dalupiri Island
- Danaodanauan Island
- Darahuay Islands
- Daram Island
- Darsena Island
- Divinubo Island
- Escarpada Island
- Fulin Island
- Goyam Island
- Guimtim Island
- Guintarcan Island
- Hilabaan Island
- Hirapsan Island
- Hiuinatungan Island
- Homangad Island
- Homonhon Island
- Inatunglan Island
- Iniyao Island
- Jinamoc Island
- Kantican Island
- Kapuroan Islets
- Karikiki Island
- Kaybani Island
- Laguinit Island
- Lalawigan Island
- Lamingao Island
- Leleboon Island
- Libucan Island
- Libucan Gutiay Island
- Linao Island
- Little Karikiki Island
- Macalayo Island
- Macarite Island
- Macton Island
- Magesang Island
- Makate Island
- Malatugawi Island
- Manicani Island
- Marapilit Island
- Maravilla Island (Samar)
- Masigni Island
- Medio Island
- Minanut Island
- Minasangan Island
- Montoconan Island
- Monbon Island
- Napalisan Island
- Naranjo Islands
  - Destacado Island
  - Majaba Island
  - Maragat Island
  - Panganoron Island
  - Sila Island
  - Sangputan Island
  - Tarnate Island
- Palihon Island
- Pamuloton Island (Tabunan)
- Parasan Island
- Pasig Island
- Pilar Island
- Poro Island
- Porogot Daco Island
- Punubulu Island
- Rosa Island
- Samar Island
- San Andres Island
- San Bernardino Island
- San Juan Island
- Santa Rita Island
- Santo Niño Island
- Sibay Island
- Sibugay Island (Samar)
- Sisi Island
- Sulangan Island
- Suluan Island
- Tagapul-an Island
- Tagdaranao Islands
- Tangad Island
- Tadtad Island
- Timpasan Island
- Tinau Island
- Tubabao Island
- Uacuac Islands
- Uguis Island
- Victory Island

== See also ==
- Island groups of the Philippines
- List of island cities and municipalities in the Philippines
- List of islands in the Greater Manila Area
- Lists of islands
