= Masin (island) =

Island in the Philippines

Coordinates: 12.257°N 121.386°E

Masin is an island located in the Oriental Mindoro province of the Philippines.

== See also ==
- List of islands of the Philippines
