= Nagubat =

Island in Antique, Philippines

Nagubat is an island located in the Antique province of the Philippines. In 1978 its elevation was recorded at 172 feet (52 m).

== See also ==
- List of islands of the Philippines
