= Sibolon =

Island in Antique, Philippines

Coordinates: 12°06′07″N 121°34′41″E

Sibolon is an island in the Philippines. In 1848, its elevation was recorded at 148 feet (45 m), and it was noted as being unsafe for ships, and boats to approach at that time.

== See also ==
- List of islands of the Philippines
