= Nauai Island =

Island in the Philippines

- Location within Philippines

Geography
- Coordinates: 10°25′49″N 122°39′51″E
- Adjacent to: Guimaras Strait

Administration
- Philippines
- Region: Western Visayas
- Province: Guimaras
- Municipality: Sibunag

Nauai Island (or Nauway Island) is an island located several hundreds of meters southeast of Inampulugan Island. It is located in Sibunag, Guimaras in the Philippines.

== See also ==
- List of islands of the Philippines
