= Tajud =

Island in the Philippines

Tajud is a small island in the Philippines located on the north coast of Mindoro island. It is located in the Occidental Mindoro province of the Philippines. Its elevation was recorded at 150 feet (46 m) in 1919.

== See also ==
- List of islands of the Philippines
