= Diwaran =

Island in the Philippines

Coordinates: 12°2′16.22″N 120°21′23.37″E

Diwaran is a 55-hectare (140-acre) island in Coron municipality in Palawan, Philippines. It has fine white sand.

Banyan Tree Resort Holdings, a Singapore based firm, was scheduled to have their 240 million dollar resort's first phase completed in the island by 2012. However, the project did not push through.

== See also ==
- List of islands of the Philippines
