= Dos Hermanos Islands =

Island group in Ilocos Norte, Philippines

Coordinates: 18°38′12″N 120°51′44″E

The Dos Hermanos Islands are two rock formations located off the northern coast of Maira-ira Point in Pagudpud, Ilocos Norte, the Philippines. The twin islands are often visited by tourists, and are a natural landmark of Pagudpud.

== See also ==
- List of islands of the Philippines
- List of islands
- Desert island
