= Cagpating =

Island in Masbate province, Philippines

Coordinates: 12°39′32″N 123°35′01″E

Cagpating is an island located in the Philippine island Province of Masbate. It is a very steep island that was denoted in 1919 as being heavily wooded, and the west side of the island has prominent cliffs that are around 150 feet (46 m) in height.

== See also ==
- List of islands of the Philippines
