= Bagumbanua =

Island in Philippines

Coordinates: 12.3898°N 123.2427°E

Bagumbanua is an island located in the Philippine Province of Masbate. In 1919, it was reported to have mangrove trees.

== See also ==
- List of islands of the Philippines
