= Boayan Island =

Island in Philippines

- Location within Philippines

Geography
- Coordinates: 10°34′15″N 119°9′32″E
- Adjacent to: South China Sea

Administration
- Philippines
- Region: Mimaropa
- Province: Palawan
- Municipality: San Vicente

Boayan Island is the largest island in San Vicente, Palawan, Philippines. The island is not alienable nor disposable, categorized as timberland, and therefore remains government property belonging to the public.

== See also ==
- List of islands of the Philippines
