= Bagababoy =

Island in Masbate province, Philippines

Coordinates: 12°41′57″N 123°36′28″E

Bagababoy is an island located in the Philippine island Province of Masbate. In 1919 it was described as wooded and "steep-to." The western side of the island has high cliffs.

== See also ==
- List of islands of the Philippines
