= Delian Island =

Island in the Philippines

- Location within Palawan

Geography
- Coordinates: 11°50′25″N 120°18′47″E
- Archipelago: Calamian Group of Islands

Administration
- Philippines
- Region: Mimaropa
- Province: Palawan
- Municipality: Coron, Palawan

Demographics
- Pop. density: 45/km^{2} (117/sq mi)

Delian Island is an island located in the Calamian Islands.

== Geography ==
The average elevation of the island is 76 m above sea level.

== Weather ==
April is the warmest month with an average temperature of 32.3 °C at noon while January is the coldest month with an average temperature of 22.6 °C at night. The island has no distinct temperature seasons, the temperature is relatively constant during the year. The temperatures do not differ much between day and night. September is on average the month with most sunshine. The wet season has a rainfall peak around October, the dry season is around the month of March.

== Natural Disasters ==
There is a medium-high occurrence of periods of extreme drought. There is an extremely high chance of cyclones hitting the island.

== See also ==
- List of islands of the Philippines
