= Tumalaytay =

Islet in Masbate, Philippines

Coordinates: 12°17′01″N 123°13′00″E

Tumalaytay is an island located in the Philippine island Province of Masbate. Its elevation was recorded at 214 feet (65 m) in 1919. The island's population as determined by the 2015 Census was 2,498.

== See also ==
- List of islands of the Philippines
