= Paltaban =

Island in Masbate province, Philippines

Coordinates: 12°40′55″N 123°35′40″E

Paltaban, also called Faltaban, is an island located in the Philippine island Province of Masbate. The northwest side of the island has a rock cliff.

== See also ==
- List of islands of the Philippines
