= Munroe Island (Philippines) =

Coordinates: 18°11′N 120°31′E

Monroe Island is a small uninhabited island located at the mouth of the Padsan River in Laoag, Ilocos Norte, Philippines. It is a sand bar island which splits the river's entrance into two small channels. The island lies south of the barangays of La Paz and north of the barangays of Gabu in Laoag. It is administratively part of the city's Barangay 34-A of Gabu Norte West which lies just south of the island on the south bank of the Padsan River. Though uninhabited, it is currently owned by a family residing in the Philippines.

== See also ==
- List of islands of the Philippines
- List of islands
- Desert island
