= Badoc Island =

Island in the Philippines

- Location within Philippines

Geography
- Coordinates: 17°55′10″N 120°24′51″E
- Adjacent to: South China Sea

Administration
- Philippines
- Region: Ilocos Region
- Province: Ilocos Norte
- Municipality: Badoc

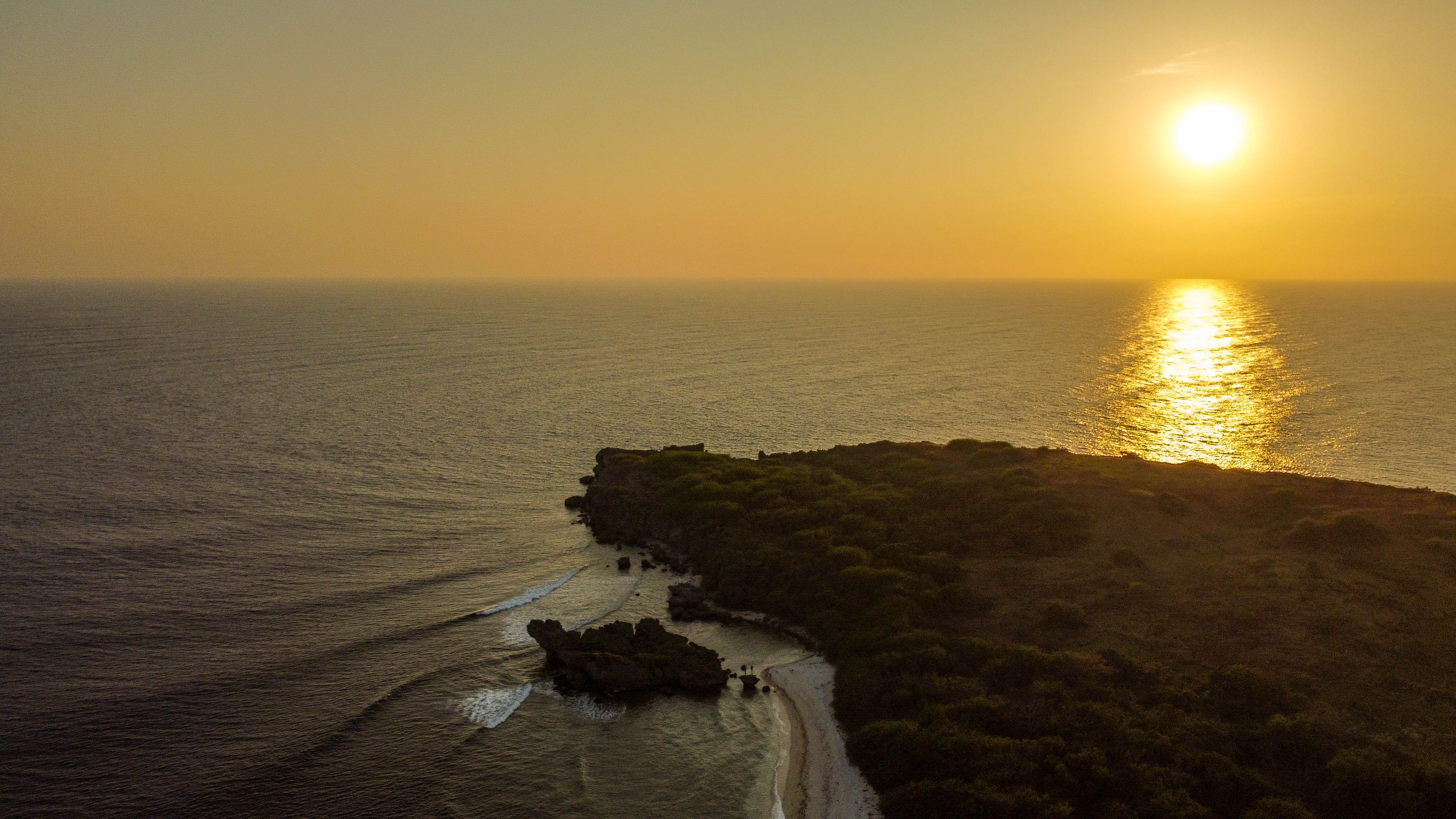
Aerial view of Badoc Island's southern tip

Badoc Island is a private island in Brgy. 5-A Pagsanahan Sur (formerly San Arisada-ad), Badoc, Ilocos Norte.

Located about 1 kilometre from the mainland, the island has a long stretch of beach with white sand, natural rock and cliff formations on the south, and a natural platform on the north. The whole island measures around 36.256 hectares.

The island was opened for investors by the provincial government of Ilocos Norte government in February 2021.

== See also ==
- List of islands of the Philippines
- List of islands
- Desert island

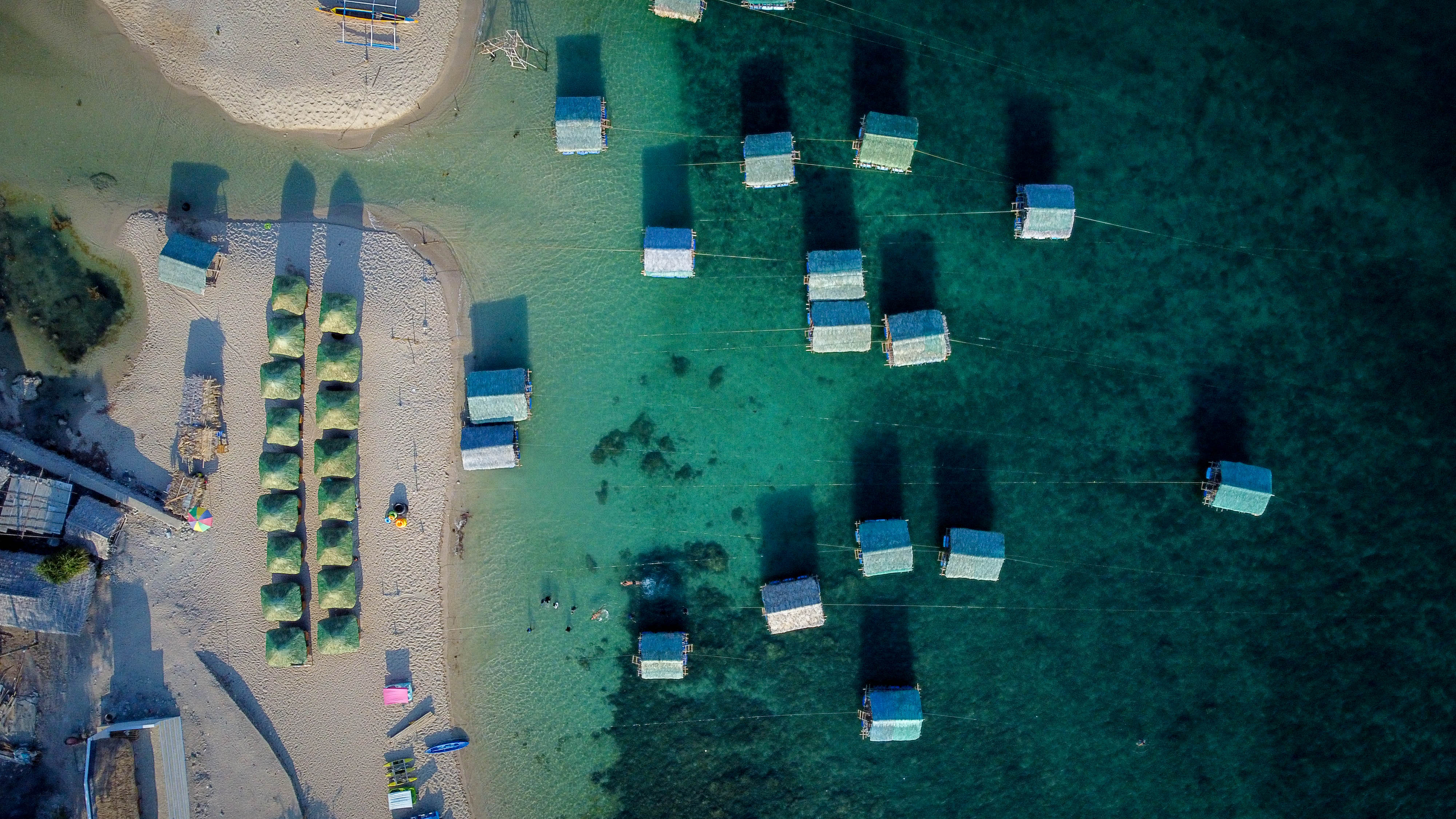
An aerial view of Badoc Island and its floating cottages

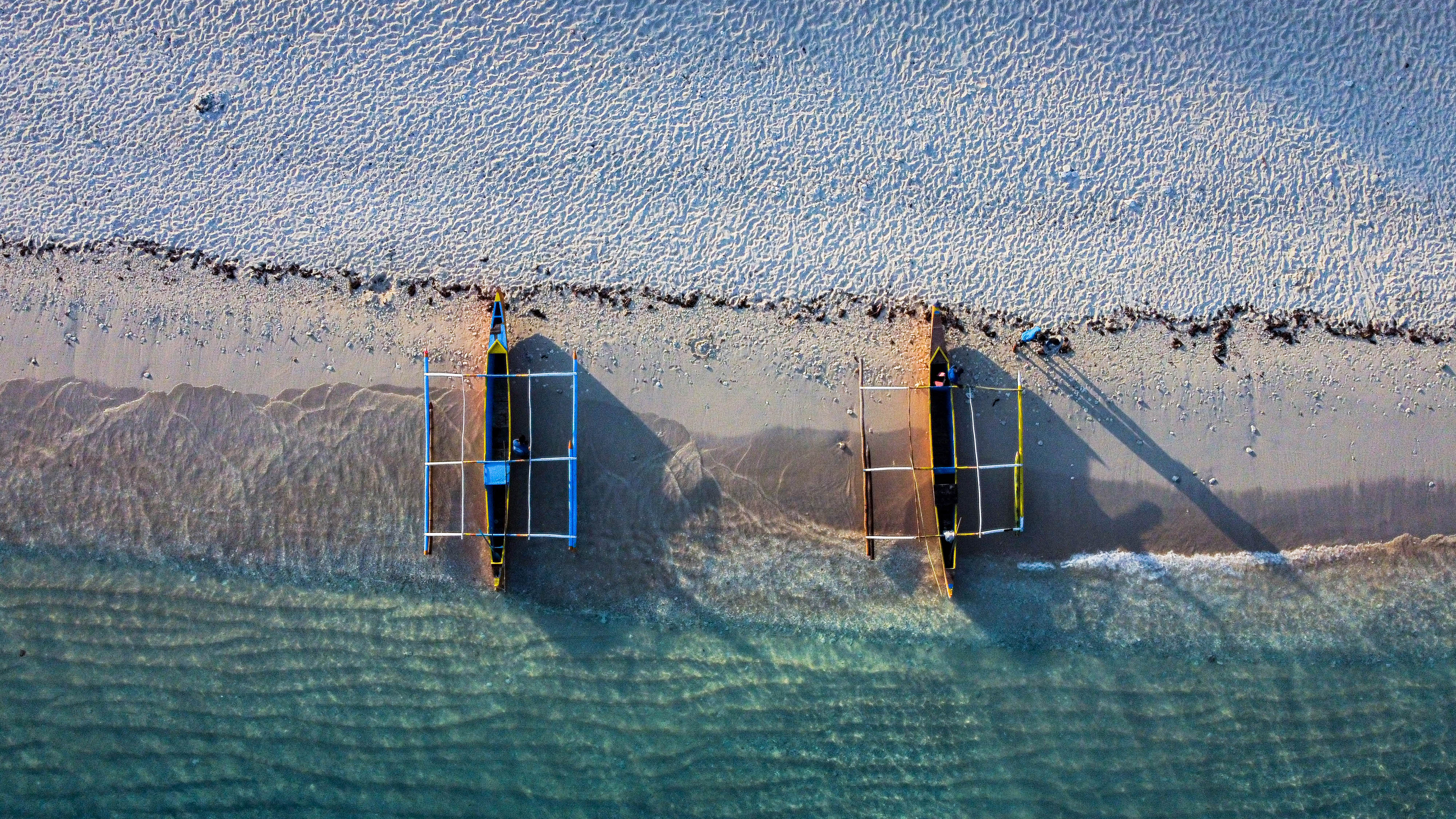
Boats on the Badoc Island's shore
