= Nici Island =

Island in the Philippines

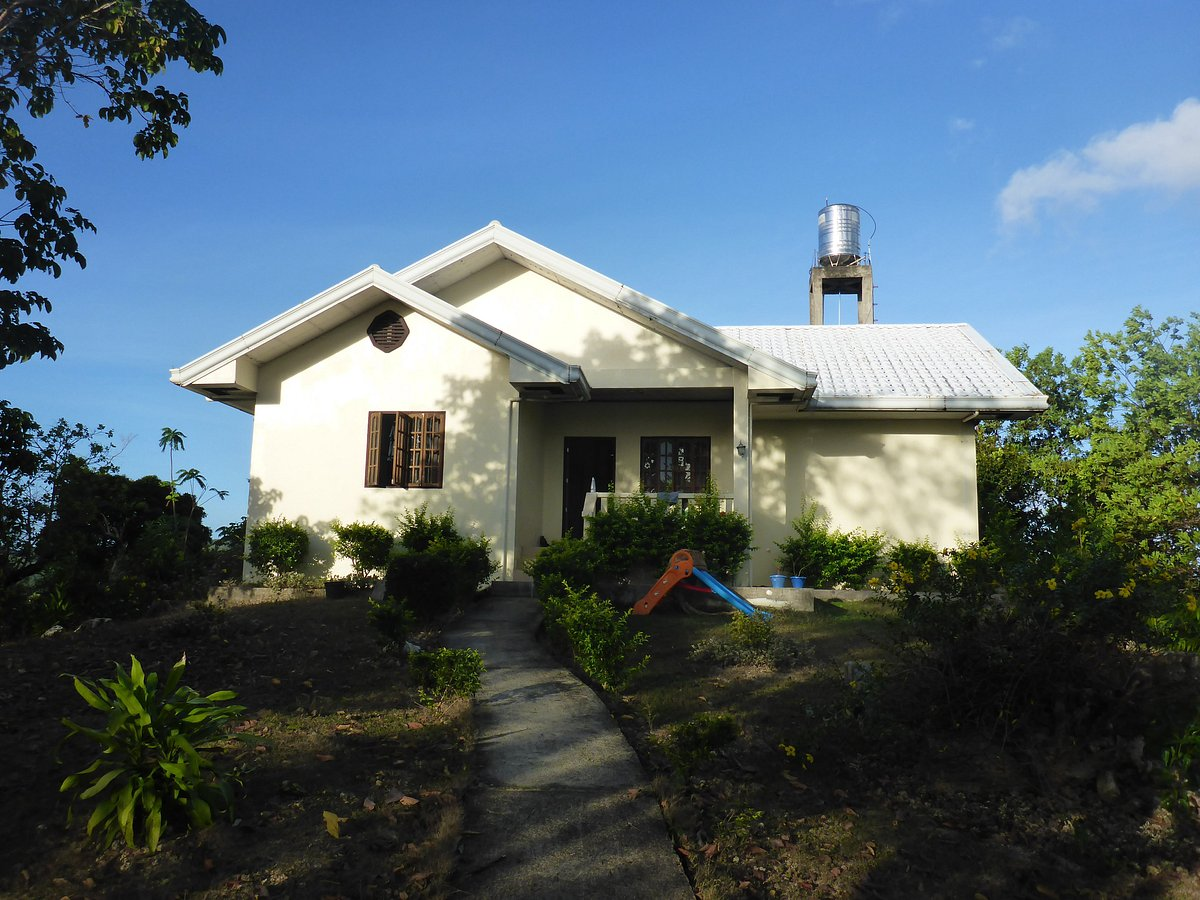
- Main house in Nici Island

- Location within Philippines

Geography
- Coordinates: 11°57′21″N 119°58′10″E
- Archipelago: Calamian Group of Islands
- Adjacent to: Sulu Sea

Administration
- Philippines
- Region: Mimaropa
- Province: Palawan

Nici Island is an island in the Philippines situated 12 kilometres (7.5 mi) from the main town of Culion in the central part of the Calamian Islands in the province of Palawan in the Philippines. The Calamian Islands are known for their many natural attractions, being a popular attraction for tourists and cruise lines.

The island has a house on top of the hill and is near the location of a SpongeBob SquarePants-themed underwater resort that was planned to be built by Nickelodeon. The project was eventually cancelled due to environmental concerns.

== See also ==
- List of islands of the Philippines
