= Animasola Island =

Islet in the Philippines

Coordinates: 13°13′12″N 123°02′48″E

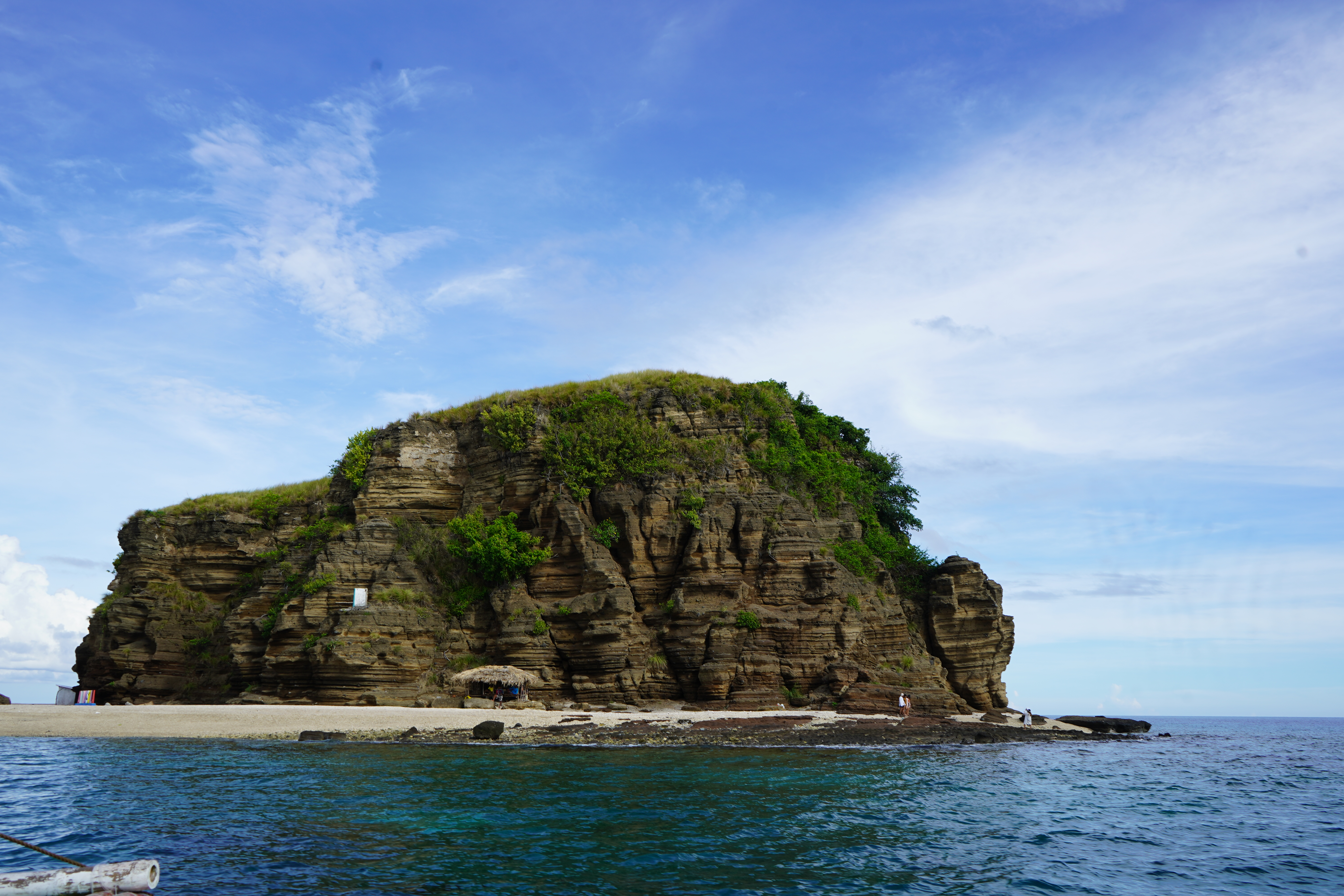
Animasola Island

Animasola Island is at San Pascual, Masbate, Philippines.
