= Chindonan Island =

Island in Coron Bay, Palawan, Philippines

- Location within Philippines

Geography
- Location: Coron Bay
- Coordinates: 11°55′27″N 120°3′5″E
- Archipelago: Calamian Group of Islands

Administration
- Philippines
- Region: Mimaropa
- Province: Palawan
- Municipality: Culion

Chindonan Island is located in Coron Bay, in Culion, province of Palawan, Philippines, part of the Calamianes Group of Islands. The island has tropical forest with springs with drinkable freshwater, making it habitable. Surrounded by more than 15 kilometres (9.3 mi) of coral reefs and several World War II shipwrecks, it is attractive to scuba divers.

== Fauna ==
The island has parrots, kingfishers, eagles and many other birds. Asian water monitors are found in the dense mangroves that surrounds parts of the island.
