= Naburot Island =

Coordinates: 10°34′3.83″N 122°30′38.41″E

Naburot Island (Locally known as Isla Naburot) is an island located in Brgy. Sinapsapan, Jordan, Guimaras in the Philippines. The island can be also seen from Alubihod Beach resort in Nueva Valencia, Guimaras. It has a size of around 39.500 square meters or around 425.000 square feet.
