= Macalayo =

Island in the Philippines

- Location within Philippines

Geography
- Coordinates: 11°51′57″N 125°27′20″E
- Adjacent to: Philippine Sea

Administration
- Philippines
- Region: Eastern Visayas
- Province: Eastern Samar
- Municipalities: Sulat; Taft

Macalayo is an island located near the east coast of the island of Samar. It is located between the towns of Taft and Sulat in Eastern Samar, Philippines. The island is situated at the entrance of Sulat Bay. Macalayo makes narrow and shallow passages together with the nearby islands of Anajao and Catalban.
