= Hilotongan =

Barangay in the Philippines

Hilotongan: Hilutungan
- barangay
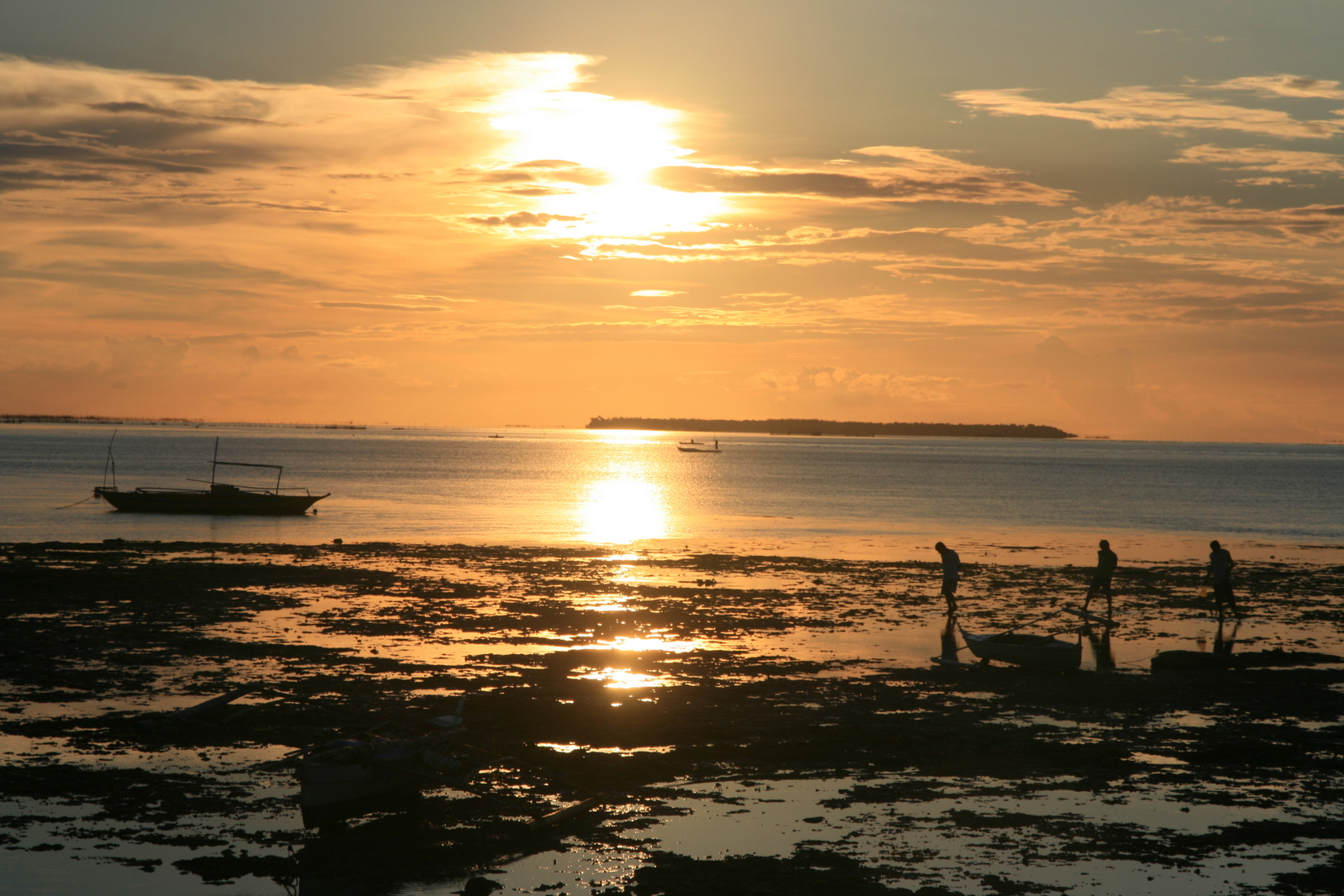
- View looking west, sunset behind Hilotongan
- Interactive map of Hilotongan
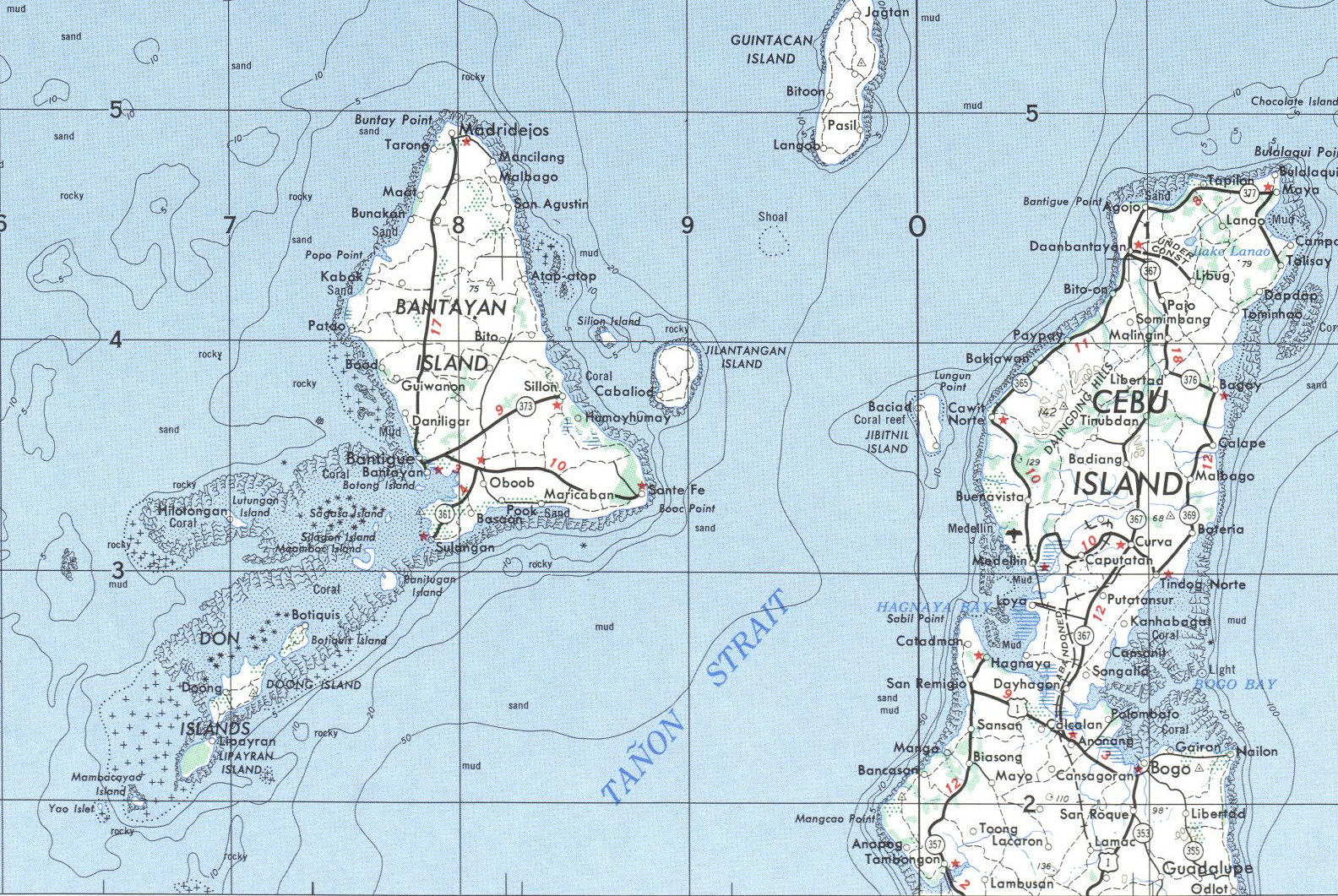
- Location within Bantayan Island
- Coordinates: 11°8′45″N 123°38′40″E

Area
  - Estimate: 50 ha (120 acres)
- Area estimated from satellite photograph

Population (2010)
  - Total: 2,060
  - Density: 4,120/km^{2} (10,700/sq mi)

Hilotongan is a small island barangay to the west of Bantayan Island in the Philippines.
