= Calibang =

Island in the Philippines

Calibang Island
- Location within Philippines

Geography
- Coordinates: 11°24′56″N 119°39′1″E
- Archipelago: Calamian Group of Islands
- Adjacent to: South China Sea; Sulu Sea

Administration
- Philippines
- Region: Mimaropa
- Province: Palawan

Additional information

Calibang is an island located west of Linapacan in northern Palawan in the Philippines. The island is a Tagbanwa Tribal Sanctuary consisting of less than a thousand native inhabitants. Visitors need approval by the Barangay Captain and/or tribal counsel prior to landfall.
