= Pamoctan Island =

Island in the Philippines

Geography
- Coordinates: 18°54′07″N 121°50′06″E
- Highest elevation: 168 m (551 ft)

Demographics
- Languages: Ibatan
- Ethnic groups: Ivatan people

Additional information

Pamoctan Island is an island in the Philippines. It is situated to the north of Pinon Island and Siship Lake. The estimate terrain elevation above sea level is 168 metres. It is one of the islands on Babuyan Islands.
