= Lipayran =

- isle
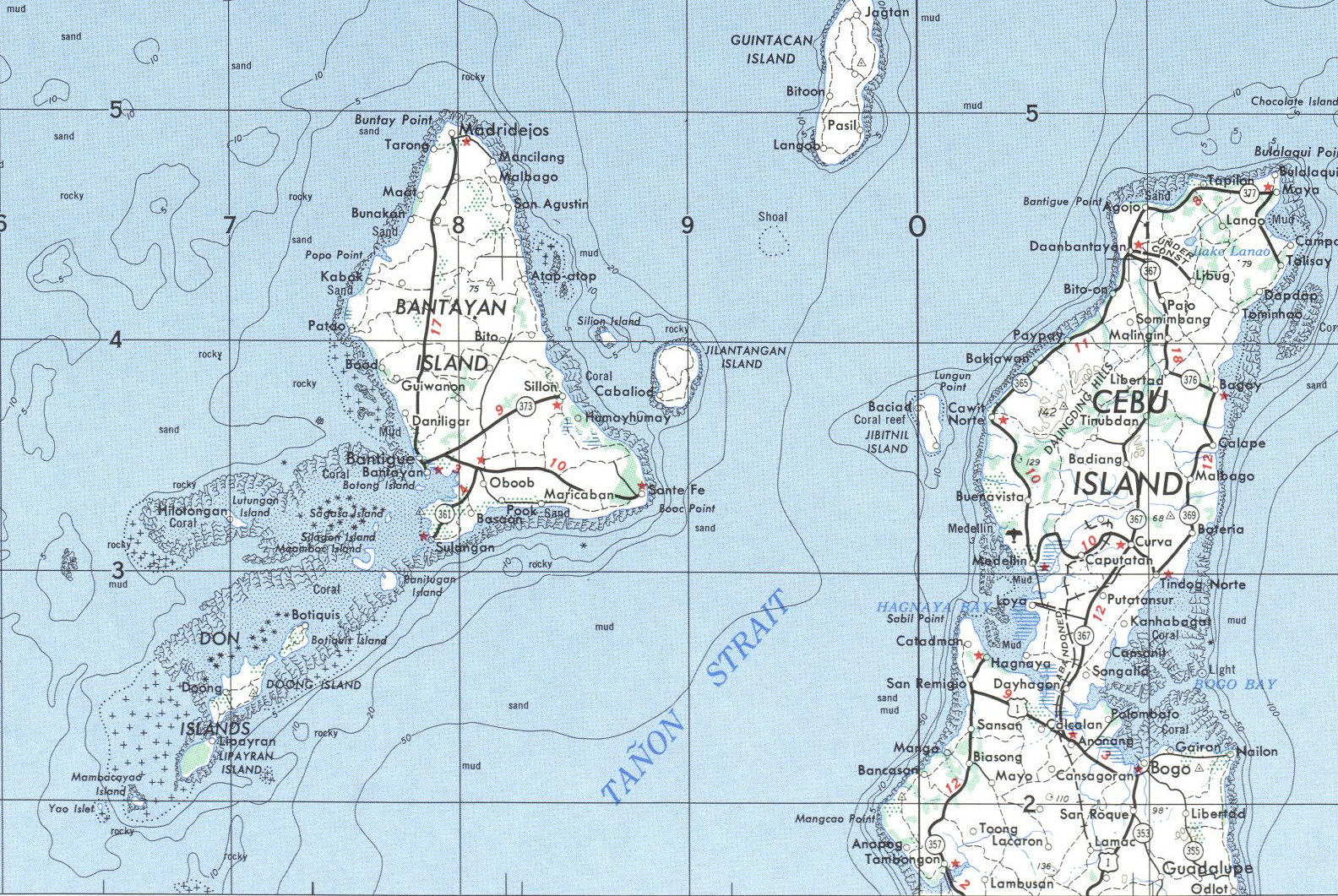
- Location within Bantayan Island
- Coordinates: 11°3′05″N 123°36′10″E

Area
  - Estimate: 150 ha (370 acres)
- Area estimated from satellite photograph

Population (2010)
  - Total: 3,067
  - Density: 2,040/km^{2} (5,300/sq mi)

Lipayran is a small inhabited island in the Don group, to the south west of Bantayan Island in the Philippines.
