= Botigues =

Small island barangay in Cebu

Botigues: Botique; Batquis; Botquis
- Barangay
- Interactive map of Botigues
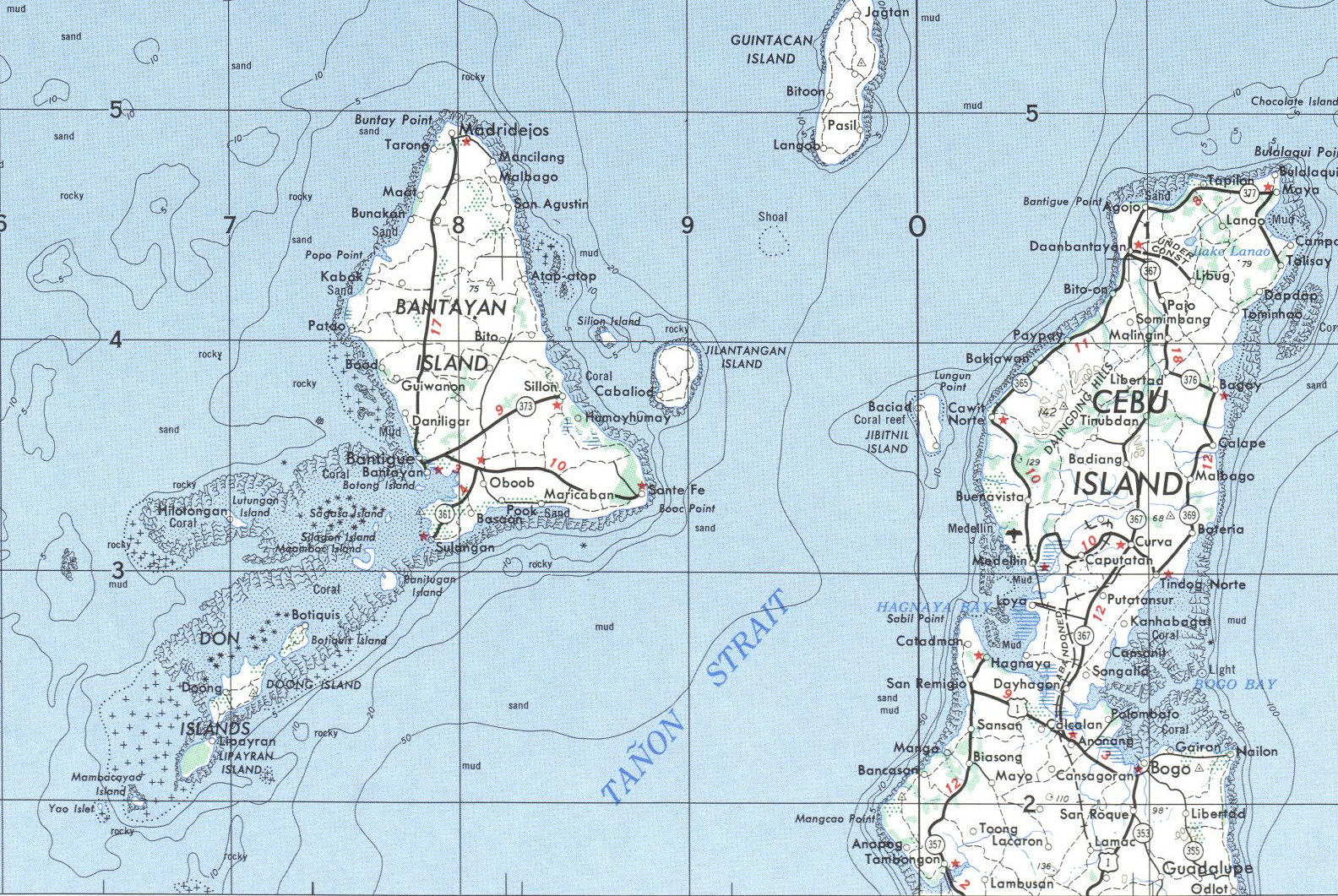
- Location within Bantayan Island
- Coordinates: 11°6′00″N 123°40′00″E
- Country: Philippines
- Region: Central Visayas
- Province: Cebu
- Municipality: Bantayan

Area
  - Total: 1.0 km^{2} (0.39 sq mi)
- Area estimated from satellite photograph

Population (2010)
  - Total: 2,704
  - Density: 2,700/km^{2} (7,000/sq mi)

Botigues is a small island barangay in the Don group occupying the whole of Botique Island. The barangay is located to the southwest of Bantayan Island and is part of the municipality of Bantayan, Cebu.
