= Mambacayao Daku =

Mambacayao Daku: Mambacayao Island; Mambacao Island
- island
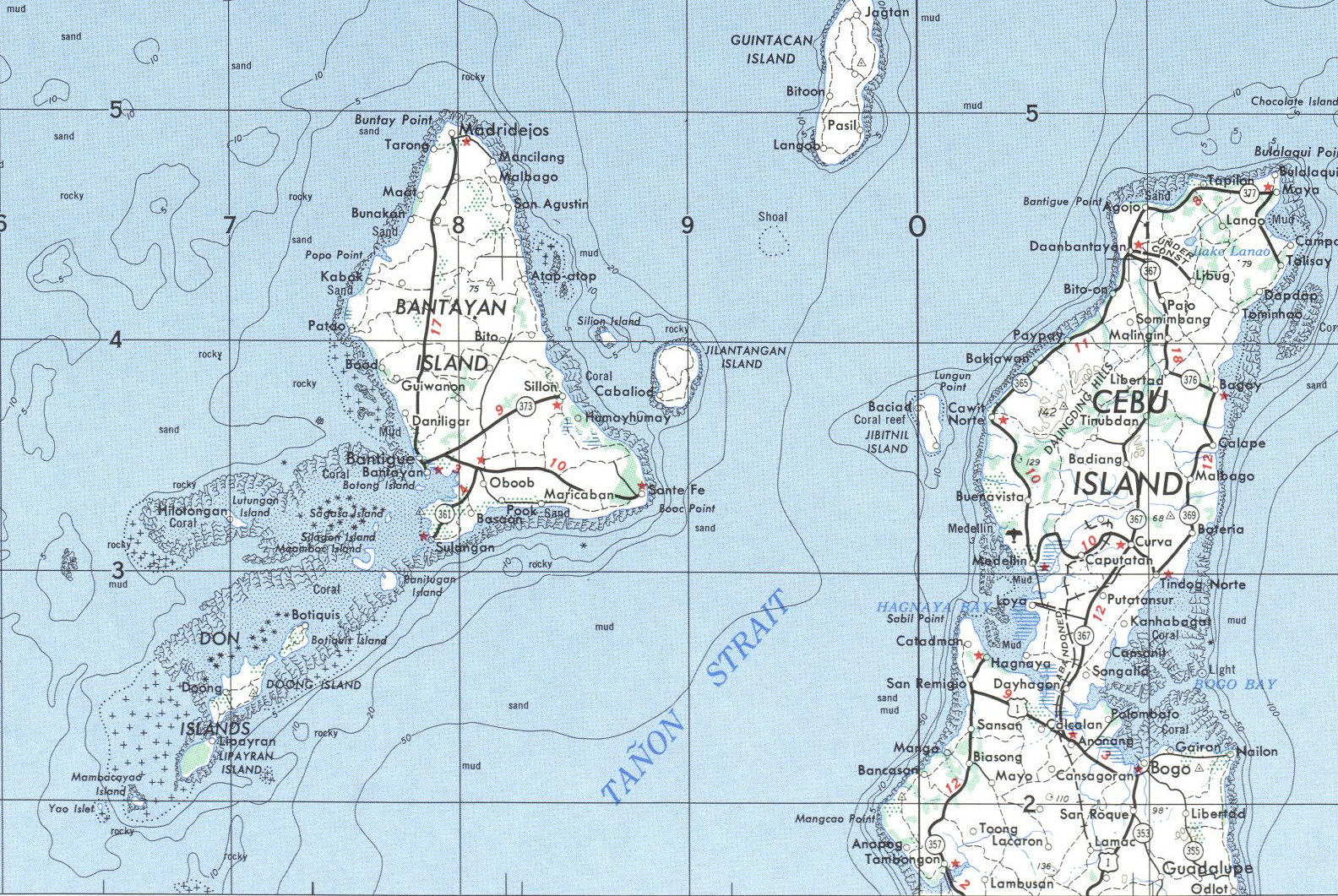
- Location within Bantayan Island
- Coordinates: 11°2′10″N 123°36′10″E

Area
  - Estimate: 18.33 ha (45.3 acres)
- Area estimated from satellite photograph

Population
  - Estimate (2012): <100

Mambacayao Daku, also known as Mambacao Island, is a small island in the Doong group, southwest of Bantayan Island in the Philippines. The island is administered under Barangay Lipayran of the municipality of Bantayan.

The island is owned by the Mabugat family of Bantayan, Cebu. A famous member of the Mabugat Family is the Filipina jazz singer and actress Ms. Vernie Varga (Ignacia Mabugat).
