= Jilantagaan =

Jilantagaan: Hilantagaan; Jicantagan; Cabalauan
- Isle
- Interactive map of Jilantagaan
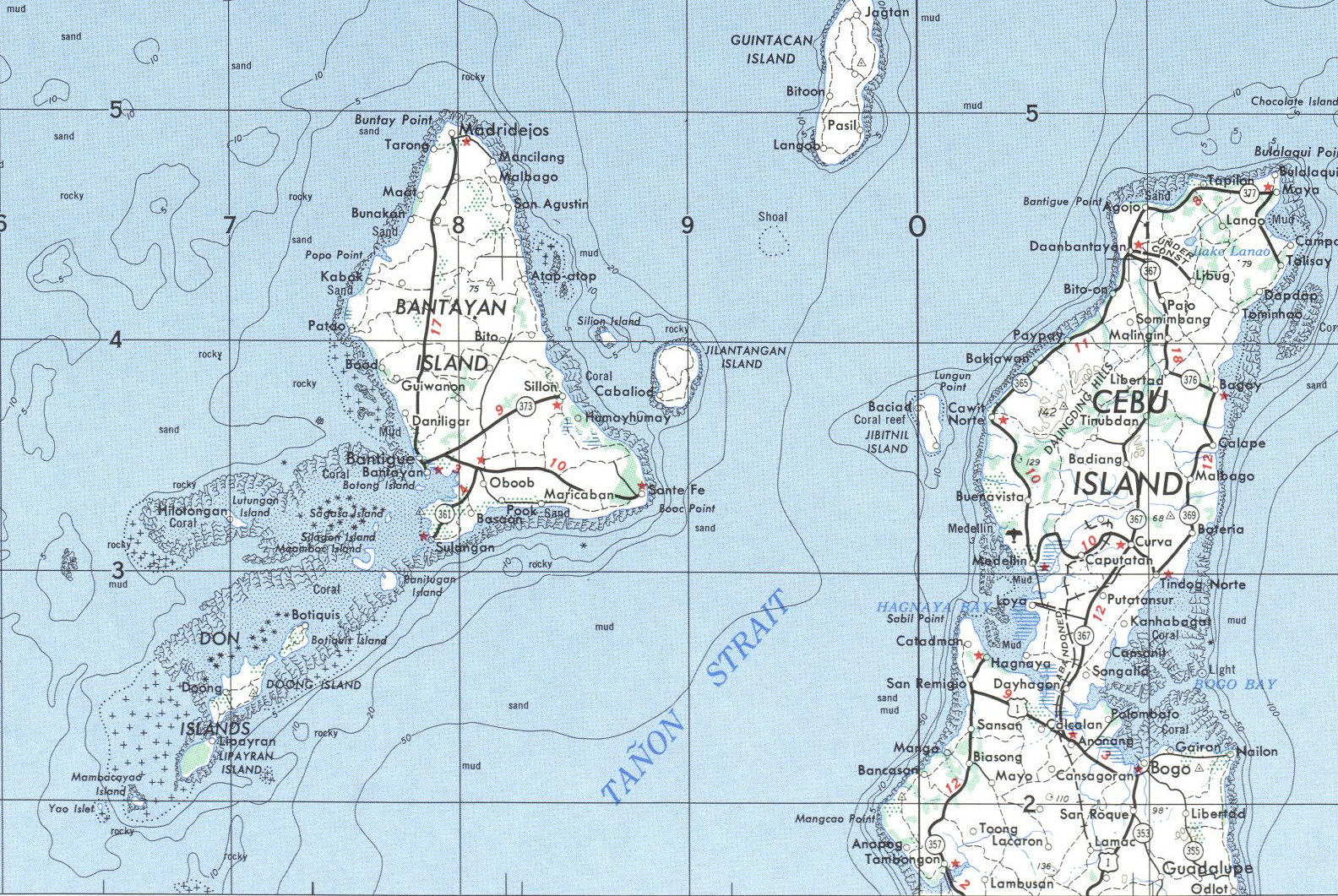
- Location within Bantayan Island
- Coordinates: 11°12′00″N 123°49′15″E

Area
  - Total: 4.25 km^{2} (1.64 sq mi)
- Area estimated from satellite photograph

Population (2010)
  - Total: 3,651
  - Density: 859/km^{2} (2,220/sq mi)

Jilantagaan is a small island to the east of Bantayan Island in the Philippines. The entire island forms a single barangay (Hilantagaan) of Santa Fe.
