= Bantayan Southern Institute =

Private school in Cebu, Philippines

Location
- Bantayan, Cebu; Philippines
- Coordinates: 11°10′17″N 123°42′59″E

Bantayan Southern Institute (BSI) is a non sectarian, co-educational institution in the island of Bantayan, Cebu, Philippines. It is the island's oldest educational institution. The institution is a part of the University of Southern Philippines Foundation. Bantayan Southern Institute was established in 1945. Upon the evacuation of Escolastico S. Duerte to the island group in northern Cebu, the constituents of Bantayan asked for an academic institution on the island. In July 1945, Engr and Agustin Jereza founded.

The director, principal (elementary and highschool) and dean of the College of Commerce, Education and Information Technology, is Joselyn S. J. Dulap. The dean of the Hotel and Restaurant Management program is Estrelleta Diongzon.

The Bantayan Southern Institute offers the following programs:

- Elementary
- Highschool
- College Degrees
  - Bachelor in Elementary Education
  - Bachelor in Information Technology
  - Associate in Hotel and Restaurant Management
  - Associate in Computer Technology
  - Bachelor of Science in Business Administration with majors in:
    - Management Finance
    - Management Accounting
