= Juan de Medina =

Spanish theologian

Juan de Medina (1490–1547) was a Spanish theologian and Spain's ambassador to Rome. Although he is repeatedly quoted and praised by several theologians of his time, little was written about his life.

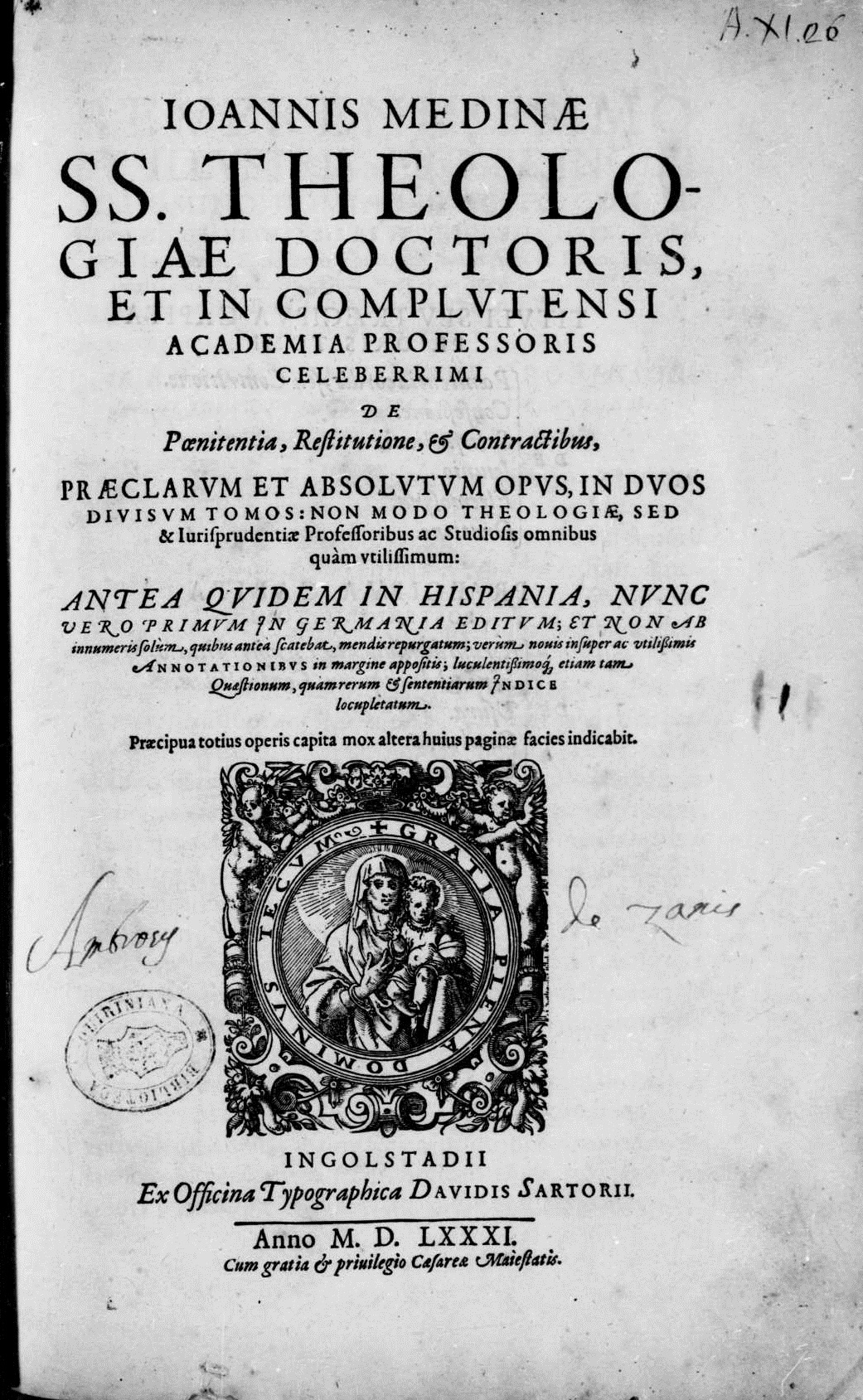
De poenitentia, restitutione et contractibus, 1581

== Life ==
He was born at Medina de Pomar in the Province of Burgos (rather than Alcalá, as some writers state).

He entered the College of St. Ildefonsus at Alcalá, on 20 May 1516, took doctor's degrees in philosophy and theology, and soon after was made canon and master of theology at the university. He was selected as primary professor of theology in the College of St. Ildefonsus in succession to Michael Carasco, whom Cardinal Ximenes wished to be made perpetual Rector of the College. From about 1526 and for the space of twenty years, Medina filled this position.

Alvarez Gomez and Andrea Schott state that Medina was buried in the church of St. Ildefonsus. The first lines of the epitaph on his tomb are:

Complutense decus jacet hic, attente viator
Ter tumultum lustra, ter pia thura crema
Hoc moriente silet vox, qua non clarior unquam
Compluti fulsit, nec fuit illa.

== Works ==
Medina's works are principally on moral theology and ethics. Some of his opinions were not in accordance with the doctrine propounded at the Council of Trent. The "Diccionario Enciclop. Hispano Americano" says that his treatise "de Poenitientia" was put on the Index published in 1707; the edition of the Index printed in 1711 does not give Medina's work, nor does any of the subsequent editions. The Council of Trent declares that at the hour of death there is no "reservatio" and that all priests can absolve "in articulo mortis". Medina says "that absolution given by an excommunicated priest is invalid"; and again, "at a time of necessity (arliculo necessitatis) any priest, not suspended or excommunicated, can absolve any person". His opinions on the "materia" for sacramental absolution, and on the "Copia confessariorum" seem opposed to the teaching of the council on these points.

Many editions of Medina's works were printed in the fifteenth and sixteenth centuries. His brother John de Medina brought out the theological books at Alcalá in 1544 and sqq.; Salamanca, 1555; Ingolstadt, 1581; Brescia, 1590–1606; Cologne, 1607 etc.

- De poenitentia, restitutione et contractibus (in Latin). Vol. 1. Ingolstadt: David Sartorius. 1581.
- De poenitentia, restitutione et contractibus (in Latin). Vol. 2. Ingolstadt: David Sartorius. 1581.
