= Thomas Cooke Middleton =

American Roman Catholic educator (1842–1923)

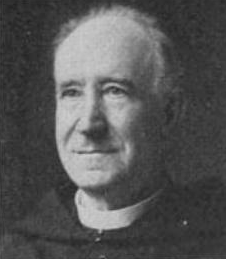
Photo of Thomas Cooke Middleton (1842–1923) from The Catholic Encyclopedia and its Makers, 1917, pages 114–115

Thomas Cooke Middleton (March 30, 1842 – November 19, 1923) was born into a Quaker family on March 30, 1842, in Chestnut Hill, Pennsylvania. At the age of twelve, he was baptized into the Roman Catholic faith with his mother and five sisters. He became a novice in the Order of St. Augustine in Tolentine, Italy in 1858 and was ordained to the priesthood in 1864.

In 1865, he returned to the United States and served Villanova College as a teacher, prefect of studies, archivist, Secretary and Socius of the Province, and, from 1865 to 1923, the college's first librarian. He was the tenth president of Villanova College, from 1876 to 1878, as well as first president of the American Catholic Historical Society of Philadelphia, an organization he helped to found in 1884.

Fr. Middleton wrote many essays on local Catholic history and the Order of Saint Augustine, including his Historical Sketch of the Augustinian Monastery, College, and Mission of St. Thomas of Villanova, Delaware County, PA: During the first half century of their existence, 1842-1892, which was published on the college's fiftieth anniversary in 1893. Other documents by Father Middleton are viewable in Villanova University's Digital Library, including an article in the Catholica Collection on Keating Rawson, entitled “An Old-Time Catholic Pioneer of Lansingburgh, N.Y." Correspondence with Maria Daly Shea, who contributed many historical records to the American Catholic Historical Society of Philadelphia, is viewable in the library's Lloyd Collection.

Fr. Middleton died at Villanova, Pennsylvania on November 19, 1923, at the age of eighty-one. He is buried in the Augustinian Community Cemetery on the grounds of Villanova University. Today, Middleton Hall, on Villanova's campus is named in his honor.
