= Sicogon =

Island in Northern Iloilo, Philippines

Sicogón
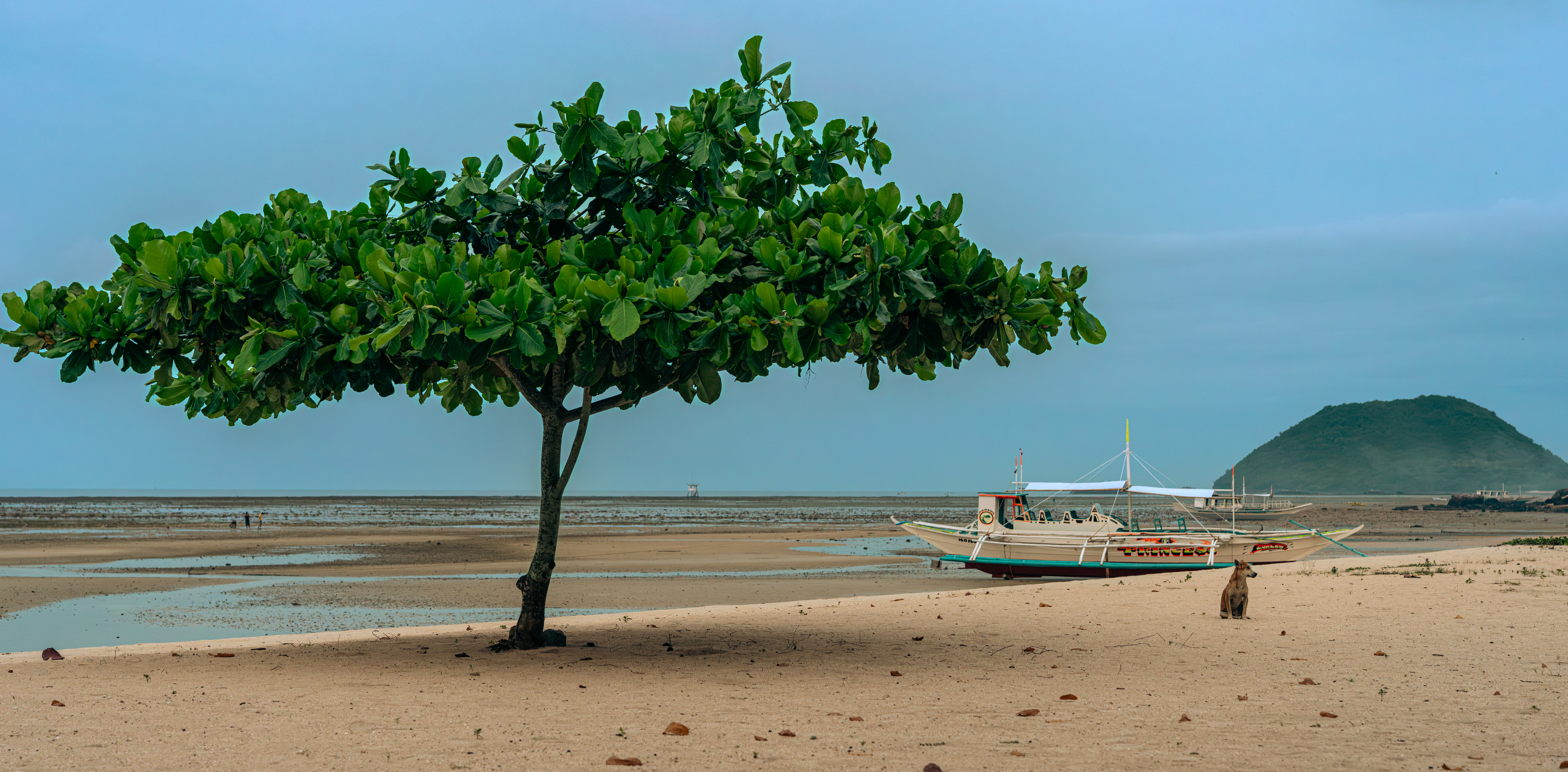
- Buaya Beach with Tumaguin Island in the background

- Location within Philippines

Geography
- Coordinates: 11°26′54″N 123°15′37″E
- Adjacent to: Visayan Sea
- Area: 1,160 ha (2,900 acres)
- Highest elevation: 214 m (702 ft)

Administration
- Philippines
- Region: Western Visayas
- Province: Iloilo
- Municipality: Carles
- Barangays: Alipata; Buaya; San Fernando

Demographics
- Population: 4,275 (2020)

Additional information
- Official website: www.sicogon.ph

Sicogón is a resort island in northern Iloilo, Western Visayas, Philippines, situated 9.95 kilometers (6.18 mi) off the northeast coast of Panay Island. It is composed of three barangays and falls under the jurisdiction of the municipality of Carles, Iloilo. According to the 2020 census, Sicogon has a population of 4,275 residents.

Sigocon logo since 2016

The island has a total land area of 11.6 square kilometers (4.5 sq mi) and is managed by Sicogon Island Tourism Estate Corp. (SITEC), a joint venture company of Ayala Land, Inc. and Sicogon Development Corp. (SIDECO). It currently operates three high-end hotels and resorts on the island: Balay Kogon, Huni Sicogon, and Hatch Sicogon.

Sicogon also offers various activities such as island hopping to nearby Islas de Gigantes, island tour, kayaking, paddleboarding, snorkeling, pontoon, hiking, etc.

== Etymology ==
The word Sicogón comes from the word cogon, which is a type of grass found abundantly on the island.

== History ==
=== Early history (1890s to 1919) ===
In the late 19th century, Sicogon Island was granted to Ynchausti & Co. by the Spanish government through a composition title, which asserted their ownership. In the 1890s, Ynchausti & Co. sold the island to Ramon Fontanet, who later ceded it to Gen. Aniceto Lacson in payment for a debt of P3,000. Lacson's acquisition was formalized through a sale document, despite the absence of key documentation due to the destruction of records during the Philippine Revolution in 1898, when insurgents burned Fontanet's residence along with important legal documents.

Lacson’s claim to the island was contested in court but ultimately upheld after evidence of over thirty years of continuous, peaceful, and adverse possession by Ynchausti & Co. and Fontanet. The possession of the island, both agricultural and non-forest areas, by Lacson and his predecessors was recognized as valid under Philippine law, despite the lack of the original title from the Spanish government. The legal dispute concluded with the inscription of the agricultural portions of the island in Lacson’s name, while the forested areas remained excluded from private ownership.

=== Tourism boom and decline (1970s to 1980s) ===
Sicogon Island was once one of the most popular tourist destinations in the Philippines during the 1970s, known for its crystal clear waters and long stretch of white sand beach lined with coconut trees. It gained further renown as a filming location for notable movies such as Ang Pinakamagandang Hayop sa Balat ng Lupa (1974). In 1976, Sicogon Island was designated as a tourist destination zone by former President Ferdinand Marcos.

However, by the 1980s, Sicogon's development has stalled and its popularity faded in favor of the nearby Boracay and other islands in the Philippines.

=== 2013 Typhoon Haiyan ===
Typhoon Haiyan passed over Sicogon Island (along with the rest of Panay) on November 8, 2013, damaging fishing boats and nets. Canadian Air Force troops arrived on Sicogon on November 26, bringing medical supplies to the islanders, many of whom were suffering from coughs and colds.

=== Modern development (2010s to present) ===
In June 2012, the Sangguniang Panlalawigan (SP) of Iloilo Province recognized a municipal ordinance declaring Sicogon Island as a tourist destination. This initiative aimed to revive the island's appeal for tourism and facilitate commercial development.

On May 9, 2013, the Sicogon Development Corporation (SIDECO), in partnership with Ayala Land, launched a ₱10-billion development project to transform Sicogon into a world-class tourist destination. The project includes plans for high-end hotels and resorts, a town center, upscale residential developments, an agricultural and resettlement area, a seaport, and the redevelopment of an existing airstrip into an airport.

The development plan faced challenges and controversy, as local residents opposed aspects of the project. This led to conflicts, prompting the town of Carles to deploy an eight-member police force to mediate between developers and residents. Disputes arose particularly over claims of forced relocation from public lands, countered by the developers' assertion of voluntary agreements with residents.

On November 8, 2014, a pact was signed between SIDECO, Ayala Land, and local residents to move forward with development, emphasizing the goal of establishing Sicogon as an ecotourism destination. In December 2016, Ayala Land opened Balay Kogon, the first luxury accommodation on the island, with hilltop villas and beachfront huts. Two years later, in May 2018, a larger accommodation was opened, located near the airport. Huni Sicogon, a two-story, 52-room boutique resort with an infinity pool and a bar. In 2023, Hatch Sicogon, a resort consisting of bungalows, was opened.

In June 2026, Ayala Land formalized a 63-hectare (160-acre) land donation to resolve agrarian disputes, legally recognizing residential and agricultural zones where local farming and fishing communities can co-exist with the modern developments.

== Geography ==
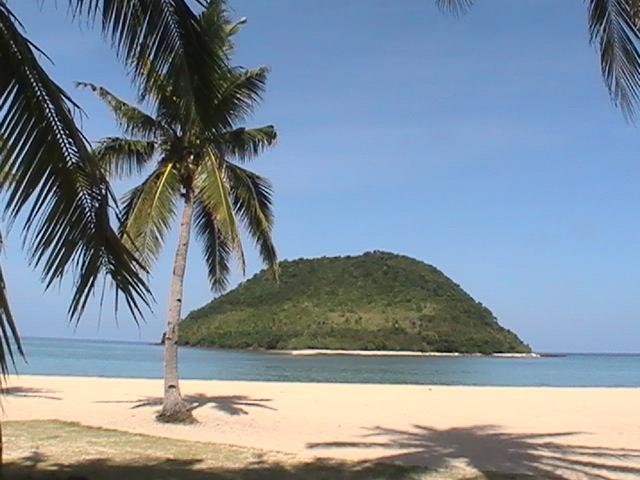
Tumaguin Island, offshore of Buaya Beach

Sicogon is 146 kilometres (91 mi) from Iloilo City. It is 0.8 kilometres (0.50 mi) southeast from Calagna-an Island. Other nearby islands include Canas Island in the north, Balbagon Island in the east and Panay mainland in the west. Tumaguin Island is accessible by foot from Sicogon during low tide. East of the islands is the Visayan Sea, which is a rich fishing ground and source of livelihood for people living in the region. Sicogon's highest point is Mt. Opao, north-east of barangay Buaya, at 214 metres (702 ft). The summit is accessible by trekking and on the summit the entire coastline that surrounds the island can be seen.

=== Barangays ===
Sicogon consists of the following three barangays:

- Alipata
- Buaya
- San Fernando

== Transportation ==
=== Air ===
The Sicogon Airport (IATA: ICO, ICAO: RPSG) is a redeveloped former airstrip that reopened in 2018. AirSWIFT began operating charter flights between Sicogon and Manila in 2018. The airport is situated in Barangay San Fernando.

=== Sea ===
Public passenger boats operate daily from Estancia port to the island. The travel typically takes about 45 minutes.

== See also ==
- List of islands in the Philippines
