= Manlot =

- Location within Philippines

Geography
- Coordinates: 11°28′59″N 123°11′10″E
- Adjacent to: Nilidlaran Pass; Visayan Sea
- Area: 6.31 km^{2} (2.44 sq mi)

Administration
- Philippines
- Region: Western Visayas
- Province: Iloilo
- Municipality: Carles
- Barangay: Manlot

Demographics
- Population: 726 (2020)

Manlot (historically Labno Islet) is an island-barangay in northeastern Iloilo, Philippines. It is one of fourteen islands politically administered by the municipality of Carles.

== Location and geography ==
Manlot is a small wooded island northeast of the Panay Island coast in the Visayan Sea. It is 370 metres (400 yd) southeast of Himamylan Island and directly west of Calagnaan Island. The body of water between Calagnaan and nearby Binuluangan Island is known as the Nilidlaran Pass, which is divided into two narrow channels by Manlot. Although a part of Carles, Manlot is a quick 15 minute pumpboat ride from Estancia.

While the island belongs to the Manlot barangay, which is politically administered by Carles, Manlot island is privately owned by the Matta family.

== Economy ==
Fishing is economically important.

== Natural disasters ==
=== Typhoon Haiyan ===
Typhoon Haiyan (locally known as Yolanda) passed over Manlot, along with the rest of Panay, on November 8, 2013. The typhoon beached a ship on the island.

== See also ==
- List of islands in the Philippines
- List of islands
- Desert island
