= Himamylan Island =

Philippine island

Himamylan
- Location within Philippines

Geography
- Coordinates: 11°29′40″N 123°10′35″E
- Archipelago: Islas de Gigantes
- Adjacent to: Nilidlaran Pass; Visayan Sea

Administration
- Philippines
- Region: Western Visayas
- Province: Iloilo
- Municipality: Carles

Demographics
- Population: uninhabited

Himamylan (historically Himamylan Islet) is an uninhabited island in northeastern Iloilo, Philippines. It is one of fourteen islands politically administered by the municipality of Carles.

== Location and geography ==
Himamylan is a small island northeast of the Panay Island coast in the Visayan Sea. It is 370 metres (400 yd) from Manlot Island and east of Binuluangan Island. Himamylan sits in the Nilidlaran Pass, which is the body of water between Binuluangan and nearby Calagnaan Island.

== See also ==
- List of islands in the Philippines
- List of islands
- Desert island
