= Talunan-an Island =

Island in the Philippines

Talunan-an
- Location within Philippines

Geography
- Coordinates: 11°33′17″N 123°13′56″E
- Adjacent to: Jintotolo Channel; Visayan Sea
- Highest elevation: 40 m (130 ft)

Administration
- Philippines
- Region: Western Visayas
- Province: Iloilo
- Municipality: Carles
- Barangay: Buenavista

Talunan-an (variously Tulunaun, Talunanaun, or Tulunanaun) is a small island in northeastern Iloilo, Philippines. It is one of fourteen islands politically administered by the municipality of Carles.

== Location and geography ==
Talunan-an is a narrow island northeast of the Panay Island coast in the Visayan Sea. It is 2 kilometres (1.2 mi) southwest of Nabunot Island and connected to that island by a coastal bank.

== See also ==
- List of islands in the Philippines
