= Balbagon Island =

Philippine island in Iloilo

Balbagon
- Location within Philippines

Geography
- Coordinates: 11°34′59″N 123°16′48″E
- Archipelago: Islas de Gigantes
- Adjacent to: Jintotolo Channel; Visayan Sea
- Area: 42 ha (100 acres)
- Length: 1.5 km (0.93 mi)
- Highest elevation: 3 m (10 ft)

Administration
- Philippines
- Region: Western Visayas
- Province: Iloilo
- Municipality: Carles
- Barangay: Lantangan

Balbagon is a teardrop-shaped island in northeastern Iloilo, Philippines. It is one of fourteen islands politically administered by the municipality of Carles. There is a small beach resort on the island.

== Location and geography ==
Balbagon is a narrow, low-lying wooded island northeast of the Panay Island coast in the Visayan Sea. It is 6 kilometres (3.7 mi) west of Gigantes Sur and directly west of Nabunot Island. Balbagon is part of barangay Lantangan, on Gigantes Sur. The Coral Cay Beach Resort is on Balbagon and is accessible from Gigantes Sur.

Two minor islands lie east and south of Balbagon. Ojastras Islet is a small cay 0.5 miles (0.80 km) south of Balbagon, while Turnina Islet is 0.75 miles (1.21 km) to the east. Shoal spits connect both islets to Balbagon.

== See also ==
- List of islands in the Philippines
