= Manigonigo Island =

Island in the Philippines

Manigonigo
- Location within Philippines

Geography
- Coordinates: 11°36′12″N 123°10′41″E
- Adjacent to: Jintotolo Channel; Visayan Sea

Administration
- Philippines
- Region: Western Visayas
- Province: Iloilo
- Municipality: Carles

Manigonigo Island (variously Manigonigo Islet and called Islote de Manigonigo during Spanish rule) is an island in northeastern Iloilo, Philippines. It is one of fourteen islands politically administered by the municipality of Carles. The island's lighthouse was built by the Spanish during Spanish rule.

== Location and geography ==
Manigonigo Island is located 6.4 kilometres (4 mi) northeast of Panay Island coast in the Visayan Sea, 2.6 kilometres (1.6 mi) east of Panay and 3.2 kilometres (2 mi) west of Nabunot Island. The island is characterized by its small and flat topography. Two minor rock formations, known as the Anegada Rocks, are 1.21 kilometres (.75 mi) southwest of Manigonigo.

== Lighthouse ==
During the Spanish rule of the Philippines, the Spanish built 27 major and 33 minor lighthouses throughout the Philippines, including one on Manigonigo Island. On 6 November 1894, the Spanish government gave notice of their intent to erect a lighthouse on Manigonigo on 15 November that same year. The original tower was a steel tourelleprefabricated in France. While the original tower was 34 feet (10 m) high, the current tower is only 29 feet (8.8 m) high; however, the lighthouse's focal point is still 68 feet (21 m) high, flashing once every seven seconds.

== See also ==
- List of islands in the Philippines
- Lighthouses in the Philippines
