= AirSWIFT =

Boutique airline of the Philippines (2002–2026)

Island Transvoyager Inc. AirSWIFT Transport Inc.
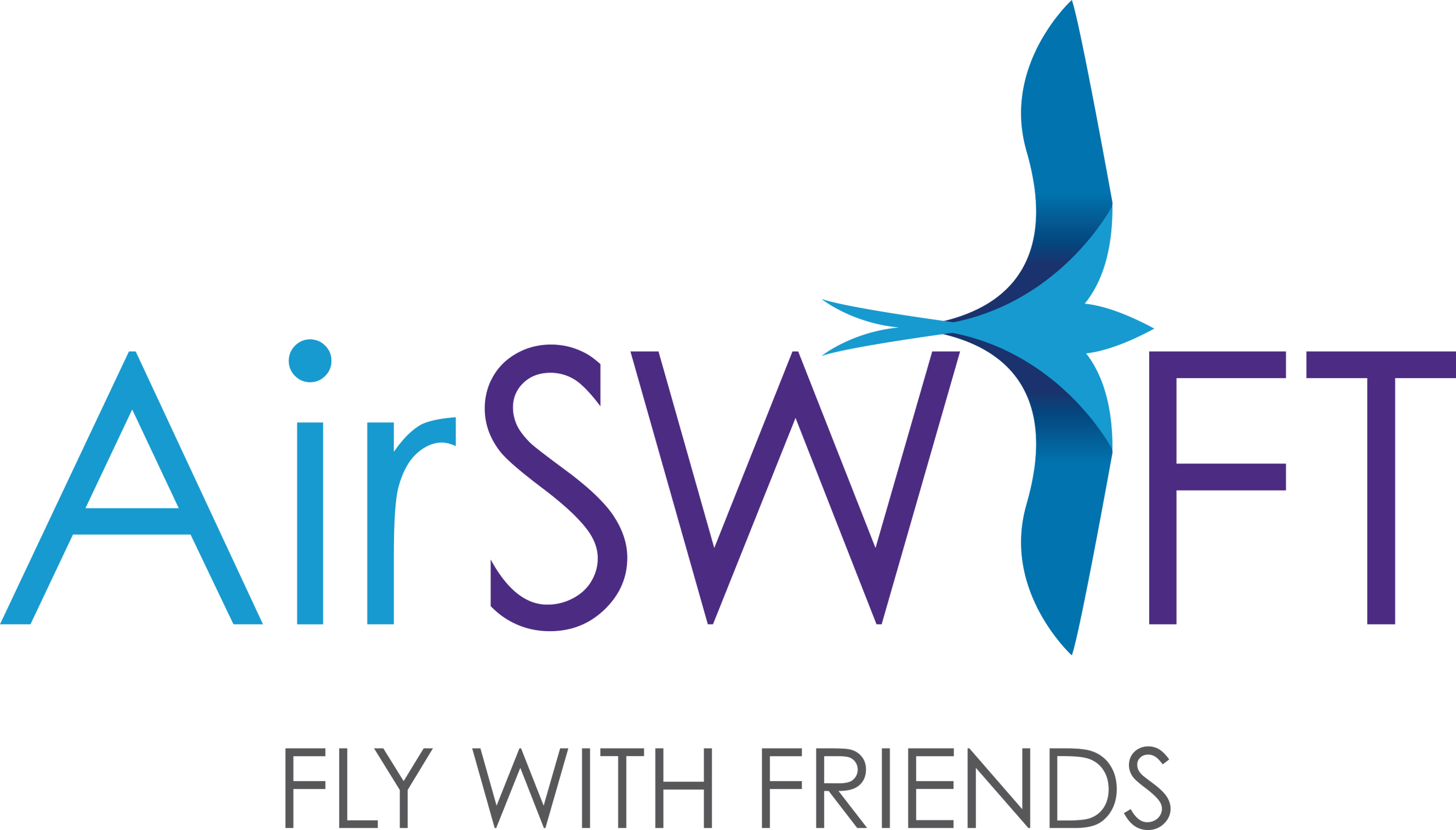
IATA	ICAO	Call sign
T6 (2002–2026)	ITI (2002–2015); ATX (2015–2026)	TRANS VOYAGER (2002–2015); AIRSWIFT (2015–2026)
- Founded: October 2, 2002 (as Island Transvoyager)
- Commenced operations: November 2015 (as AirSWIFT)
- Ceased operations: November 2015 (as Island Transvoyager); July 1, 2026 (as AirSWIFT; merged into Cebgo)
- AOC #: 2010022
- Operating bases: El Nido; Manila
- Fleet size: 5
- Destinations: 9
- Parent company: ALI Capital Corpotation (2012–2024); Cebu Pacific (2024–2026)
- Headquarters: Pasay, Metro Manila, Philippines
- Website: www.air-swift.com

AirSWIFT (formerly Island Transvoyager) was a boutique airline in the Philippines with a permit to operate domestic scheduled and non-scheduled air transportation services. It also served the aircraft transportation requirements of its affiliated company, El Nido Resorts. In October 2024, Cebu Pacific acquired AirSWIFT at a cost of P1.75 billion from ALI Capital Corporation of Ayala Corporation.

== History ==
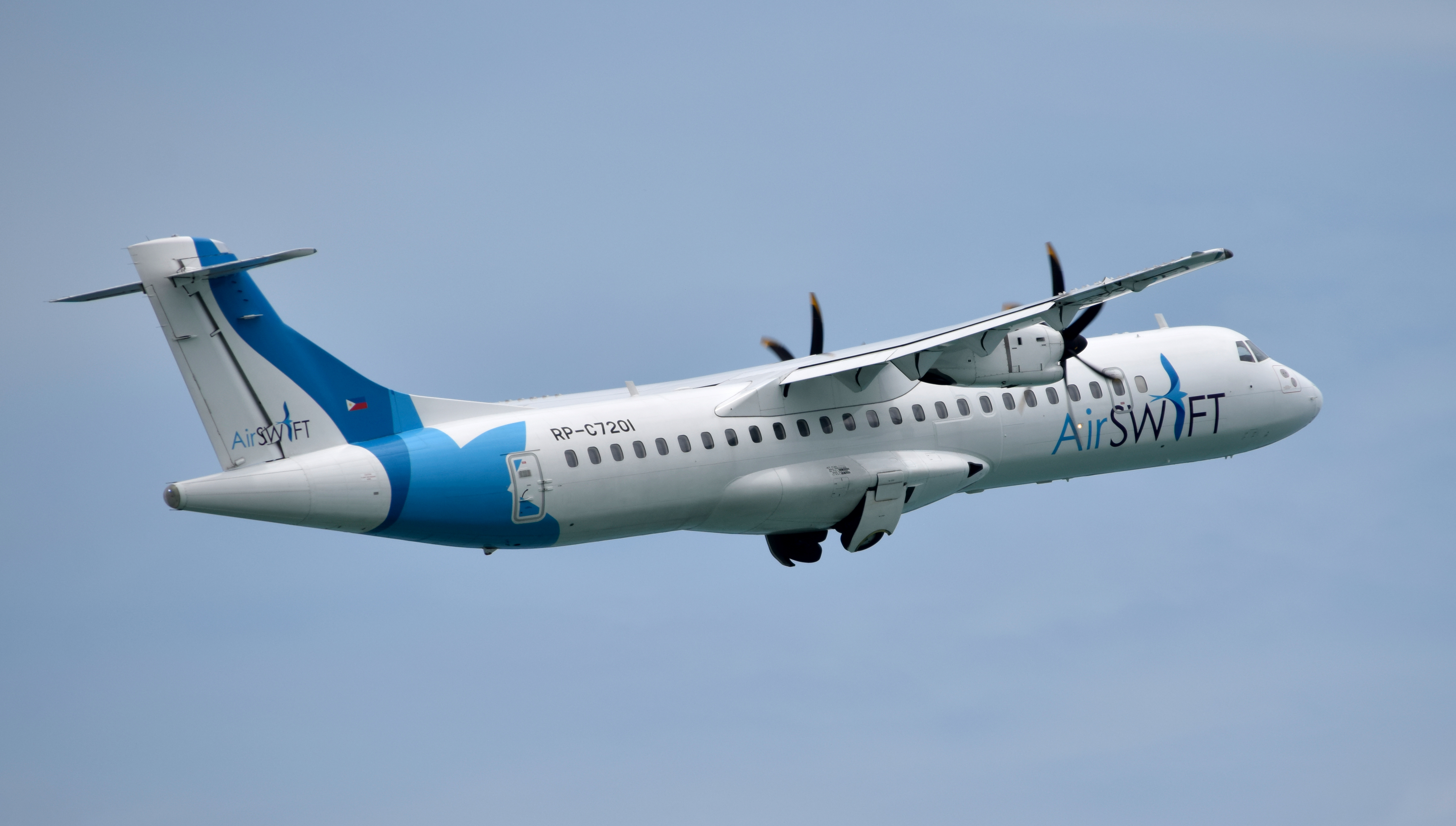
AirSWIFT ATR 72-600

Founded in 2002 as Island Transvoyager, the company had three Dornier 228 aircraft. All of these were retired by early 2013 and replaced by ATR 42-600s. Ayala Capital Corporation acquired ownership of ITI in 2012. In October 2015, Island Transvoyager rebranded as AirSWIFT. On October 7, 2024, Cebu Pacific announced the acquisition of AirSWIFT from ALI Capital Corporation at a cost of P1.75 billion, while retaining flight schedule and services.

On June 15, 2026 Cebu Pacific announced regional subsidiary Cebgo will assume operation of all AirSWIFT flights from July 1, effectively retiring the AirSwift brand.

== Destinations ==
The company operated El Nido Airport, a private airport in El Nido, Palawan which serves as its operating base.

As of June 2026 (at the time of merger), AirSWIFT flew to the following domestic destinations within the Philippines:

Region	City	Airport	Notes	References
Cagayan Valley	Basco	Basco Airport	Terminated	
Central Luzon	Angeles City	Clark International Airport		
Central Visayas	Cebu	Mactan–Cebu International Airport		
Central Visayas	Tagbilaran	Bohol–Panglao International Airport		
Mimaropa	Alcantara	Tugdan Airport	Terminated	
Mimaropa	Busuanga	Francisco B. Reyes Airport		
Mimaropa	El Nido	El Nido Airport	Base	
National Capital Region	Manila	Ninoy Aquino International Airport	Terminated	
Western Visayas	Caticlan	Godofredo P. Ramos Airport		
Western Visayas	Sicogon	Sicogon Airport	Terminated	

== Fleet ==
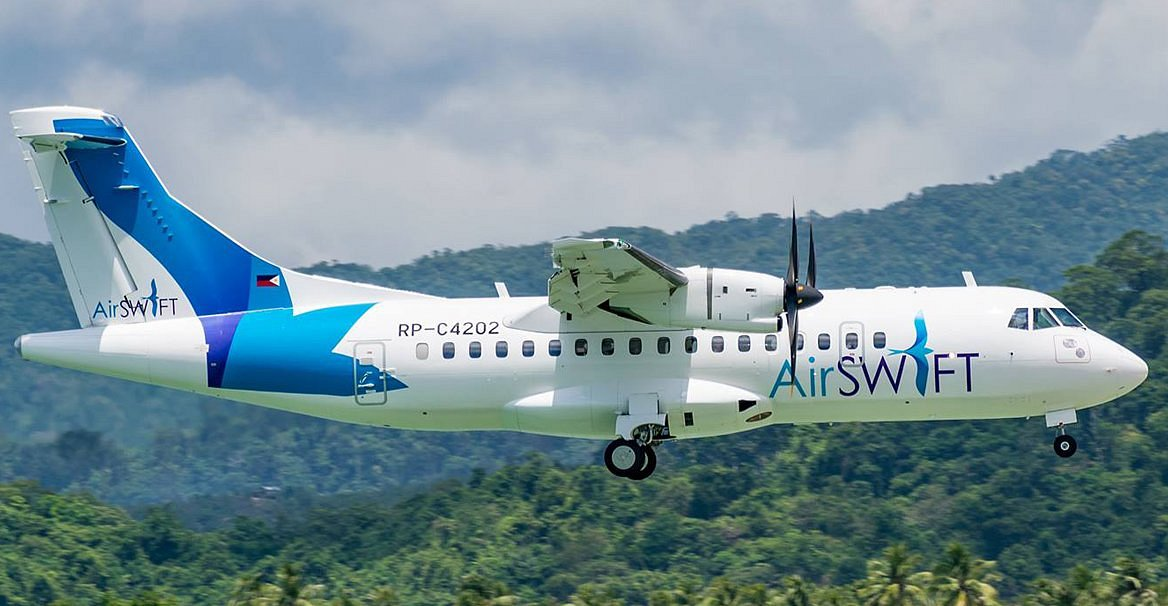
AirSWIFT ATR 42-600

As of June 2026 (at the time of merger), AirSWIFT operated the following aircraft:

AirSWIFT fleet
Aircraft	Total	Orders	Notes
ATR 42-600	2	—	
ATR 72-600	3	—	
Total	5		

== Airports owned ==
AirSWIFT was one of the two known charter airlines in the Philippines which own and operate a private airport. The other is Sky Pasada.

In Palawan, it operated El Nido Airport while it operated Sicogon Airport in Sicogon Island, Carles, Iloilo.
