= Sicogon Airport =

Airport in Sicogon, Philippines

Sicogon Airport Hulugpaan sang Sicogon Paliparan ng Sicogon
- IATA: ICO; ICAO: RPSG

Summary
- Airport type: Private
- Owner/Operator: AirSWIFT
- Serves: Sicogon
- Location: Sicogon, Carles, Iloilo, Philippines
- Elevation AMSL: 8 m (26 ft)
- Coordinates: 11°26′59″N 123°16′0″E

Map
- Location in the Philippines

Runways
Direction	Length		Surface
Direction	m	ft	Surface
06/24	1,300	4,265	Concrete
- Sources: at WikiMapia

Sicogon Airport (Note: Hiligaynon: Hulugpaan sang Sicogon, Filipino: Paliparan ng Sicogon) (IATA: ICO, ICAO: RPSG) is an airport serving the general area of Sicogon Island, located in the municipality of Carles, in the province of Iloilo, in the Philippines. It is located in Barangay San Fernando. The airstrip is owned and operated by AirSWIFT, opened in 2018.
