= Antonia Island =

Island in Iloilo, Philippines

Native name: Cabugao Gamay
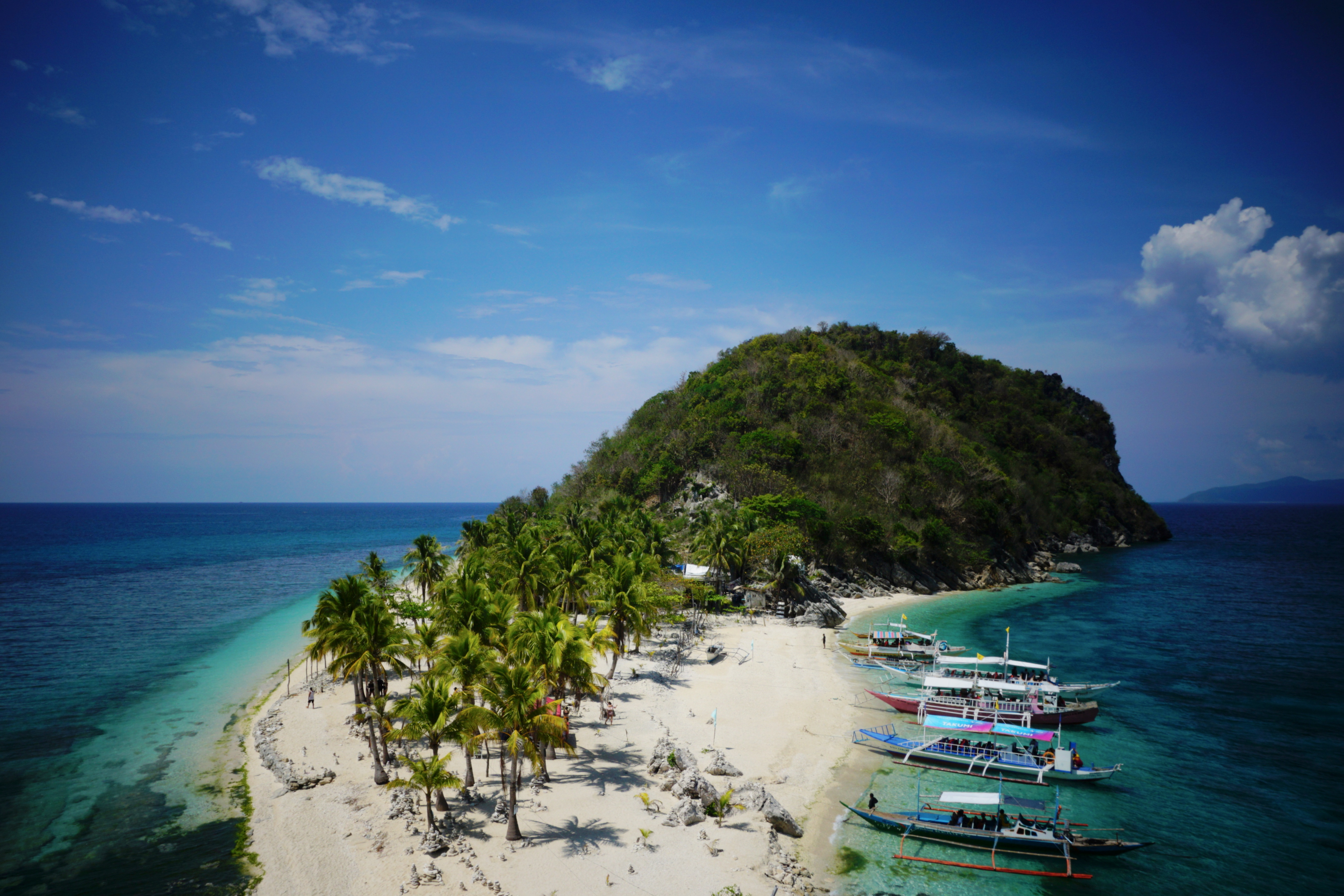

- Location within Philippines

Geography
- Location: Visayan Sea
- Coordinates: 11°33′26″N 123°20′45″E
- Archipelago: Islas de Gigantes
- Highest elevation: 357 ft (108.8 m)

Administration
- Philippines
- Region: Western Visayas
- Province: Iloilo
- Municipality: Carles

Demographics
- Population: uninhabited

Antonia Island, locally known as Cabugao Gamay [lit. 'Little Cabugao'] because of the bigger island north of it named Cabugao that locals refer to as Cabugao Daku [lit. 'Big Cabugao'], is a small, uninhabited island in northeastern Iloilo, Philippines. It is one of fourteen islands politically administered by the municipality of Carles. Along with Bantigui Island and Cabugao Island, it is one of three minor southern islets in the Islas de Gigantes archipelago.

The island is a well-known location in the archipelago, referred to as "selfie island" because of its viewpoint overlooking the island's center beaches and the hill with vegetation at its southern end.

== Location and geography ==
Cabugao Gamay is a small island northeast of the Panay Island coast in the Visayan Sea. It is 0.5 kilometres (0.31 mi) south of Gigantes Sur and is part of the Islas de Gigantes island group. Cabugao Gamay is a widely photographed island in Islas de Gigantes and is often part of island-hopping tours of the archipelago. It features two white sand beaches that form like a sandbar connecting two islets.

== See also ==
- List of islands in the Philippines
- List of islands
- Desert island
