= Bantigue Island =

Island in the Philippines

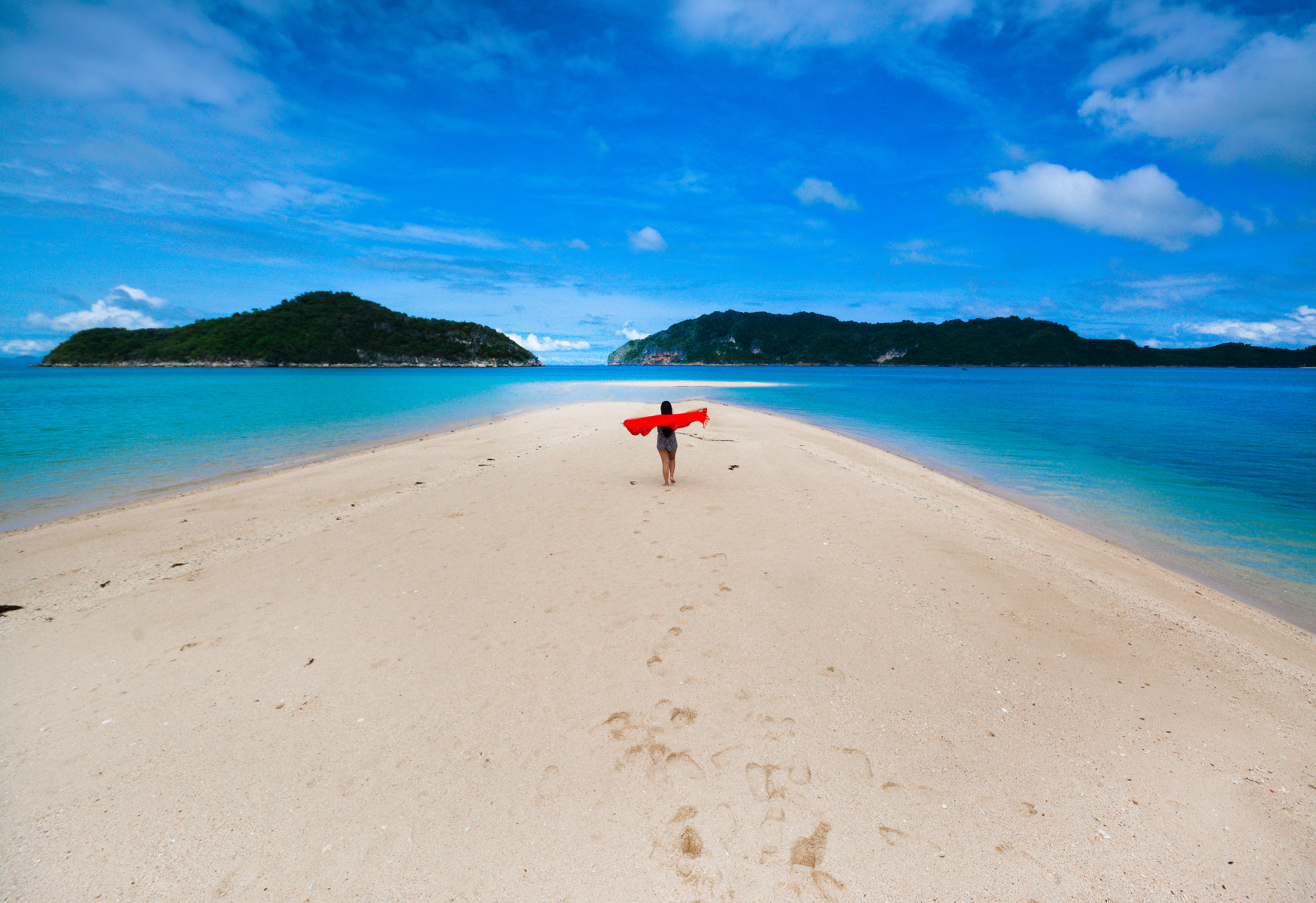

- Location within Philippines
- Other names: Bantigui Island

Geography
- Coordinates: 11°34′17.59″N 123°21′30.49″E
- Archipelago: Islas de Gigantes
- Adjacent to: Visayan Sea

Administration
- Philippines
- Region: Western Visayas
- Province: Iloilo
- Municipality: Carles

Bantigue Island, also known as Bantigui Island, is a small uninhabited island in the Islas de Gigantes archipelago in northeastern Iloilo, Philippines. It is one of fourteen islands under the jurisdiction of the municipality of Carles. The island is known for its long sandbar and is part of the Islas de Gigantes island-hopping tours.

== Location and geography ==
Bantigue Island is located 21 kilometres (13 mi) east of Panay Island in the Visayan Sea and 1.2 kilometres (0.75 mi) southeast of Gigantes Sur. It is part of the Islas de Gigantes island group and is commonly included in island-hopping tours of the archipelago. The island features a long white sandbar and connecting three islets.

== See also ==
- List of islands in the Philippines
