= Jintotolo =

Island in the Philippines

Coordinates: 11°51′00″N 123°07′40″E

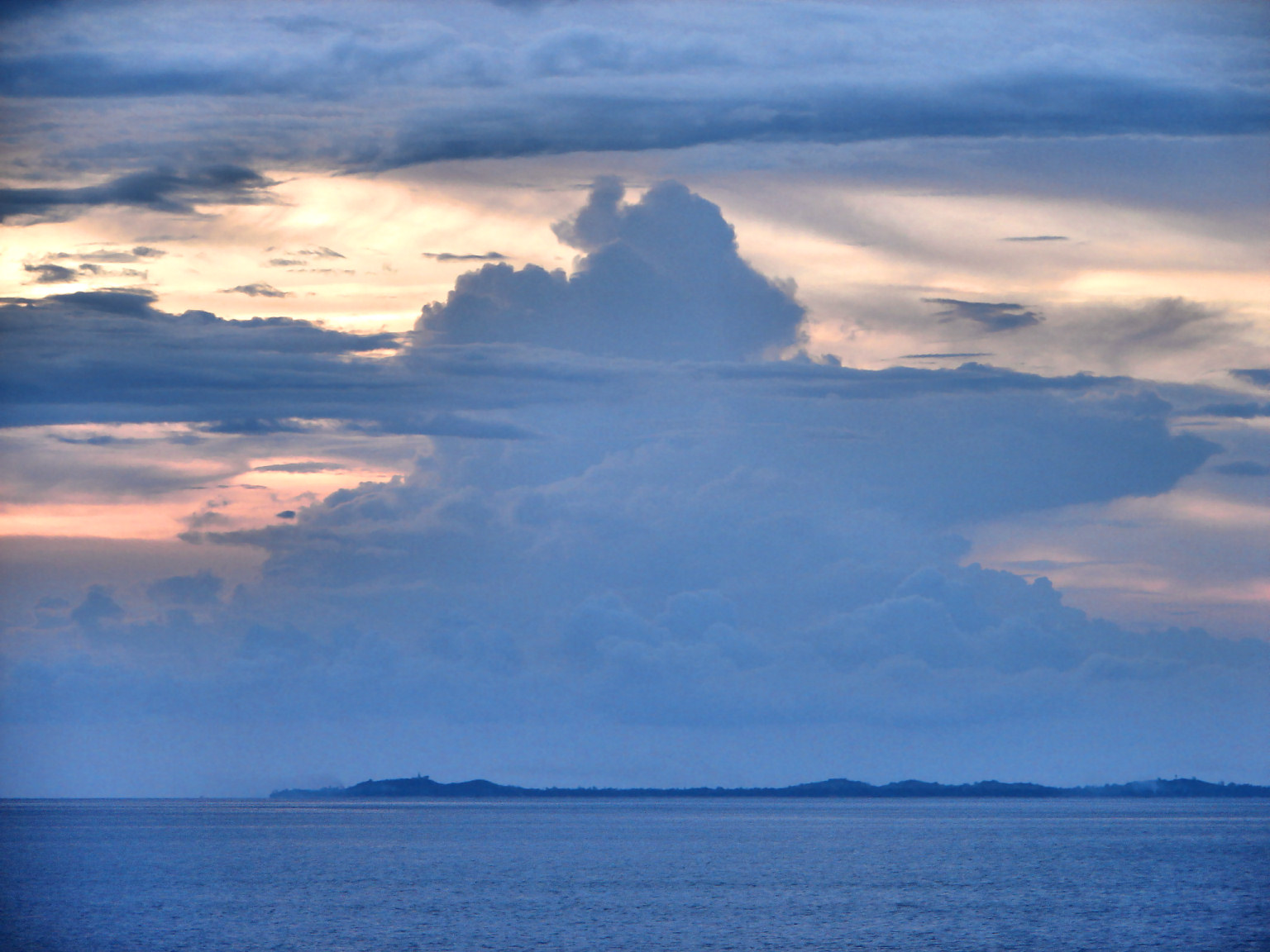
- Silhouette of Jintotolo Island as seen from the Jintotolo Channel
- Interactive map of Jintotolo

Geography
- Location: Jintotolo Channel

Administration
- Philippines
- Region: Bicol Region
- Province: Masbate

Jintotolo is an island within the Jintotolo Channel, part of the Province of Masbate, Philippines. It constitutes two barangays of the Municipality of Balud (Barangays Cantil and Jintotolo) and has a population of 3,687 persons in the 2020 census.

Its elevation was recorded at around 120 feet (37 m) in 1919. A lighthouse with a tower at 51 feet (16 m) in height exists on Jintotolo island.

== See also ==
- List of islands of the Philippines
