= Binuluangan =

Philippines island

- Location within Philippines

Geography
- Location: Bancal Bay
- Coordinates: 11°31′N 123°11′E
- Adjacent to: Jintotolo Channel; Visayan Sea
- Length: 8 km (5 mi)
- Width: 4 km (2.5 mi)
- Highest elevation: 198 ft (60.4 m)

Administration
- Philippines
- Region: Western Visayas
- Province: Iloilo
- Municipality: Carles
- Barangay: Binuluangan

Demographics
- Population: 1,682 (2010)

Binuluangan (historically Balin) is an inhabited island-barangay in northeastern Iloilo, Philippines. It is one of fourteen islands politically administered by the municipality of Carles. In 2010 it had a population of 1,682. There is an elementary school on the island.

== Location and geography ==
Binuluangan is a wooded island northeast of the Panay Island coast in the Visayan Sea. It is 2 kilometres (1.2 mi) west of Calagnaan Island and separated from that island by the Nilidlaran Pass. Binuluangan is surrounded by several small islands and islets, including Tabugon and Tabugon Chico to the north, Himamylan and Adcalayo to the south, and Nilidlaran (variously Linadlaran) to the southeast.

== Natural disasters ==
=== Typhoon Haiyan ===
Binuluangan was one of several islands to receive aid from HMS Daring in the aftermath of Typhoon Haiyan.

== See also ==
- List of islands in the Philippines
