= Tumaguin =

Uninhabited island in the Philippines

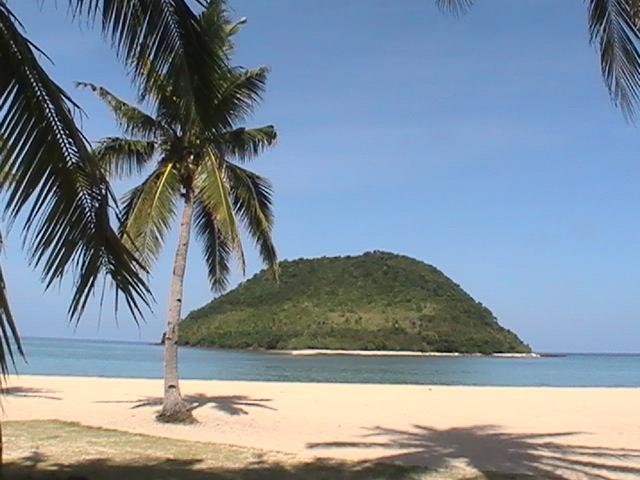
- Tumaguin Island, as seen from Sicogon Island. 2009.

- Location within Philippines

Geography
- Coordinates: 11°27′23″N 123°16′56″E
- Adjacent to: Visayan Sea
- Area: 2.09 km^{2} (0.81 sq mi)
- Highest elevation: 369 ft (112.5 m)

Administration
- Philippines
- Region: Western Visayas
- Province: Iloilo
- Municipality: Carles
- Barangay: Buaya

Demographics
- Population: uninhabited

Tumaguin (variously Tamaguin, Tomaquin, or Tumaguin Islet) is a small, uninhabited island in the Visayan Sea. Along with nearby Sicogon Island, it is part of Carles, Iloilo.

== Location and geography ==
Tumaguin Island is located 0.40 kilometres (0.25 mi) due east of Sicogon Island. The island is 52 metres (171 ft) above sea level. There is a four fathom patch of deep water a little over 4 kilometres (2.5 mi) from the island.

== Transport ==
Tumaguin Island is accessible from barangay Buaya in Sicogon by boat, or by foot during low tide.

== See also ==
- List of islands in the Philippines
- List of islands
- Desert island
