= Carles, Iloilo =

Municipality in Iloilo, Philippines

Carles Banwa sang Carles Badiang
- Municipality
- Municipality of Carles
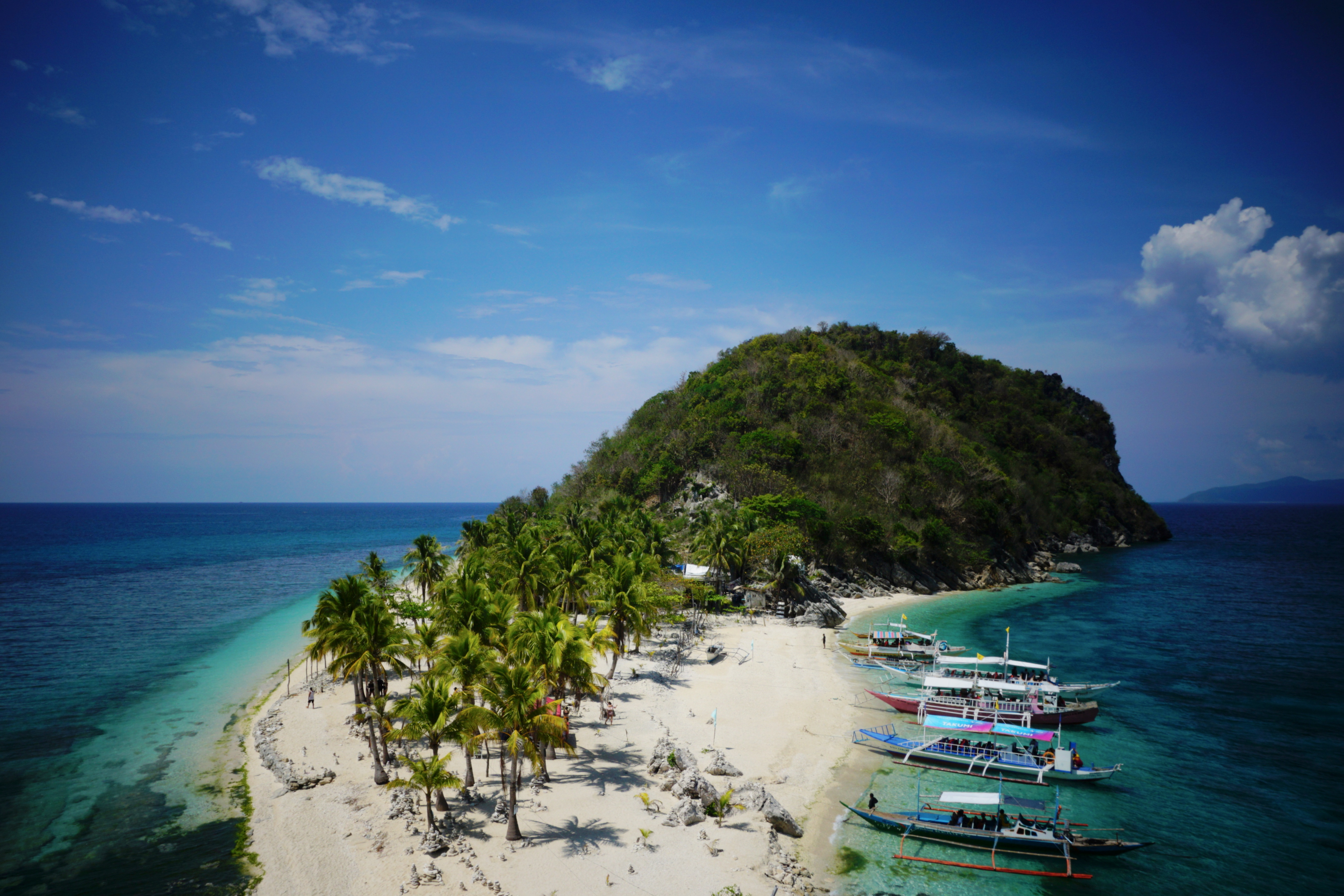
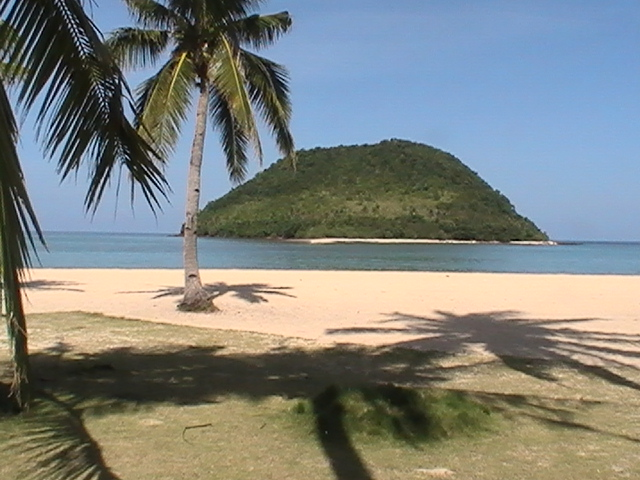
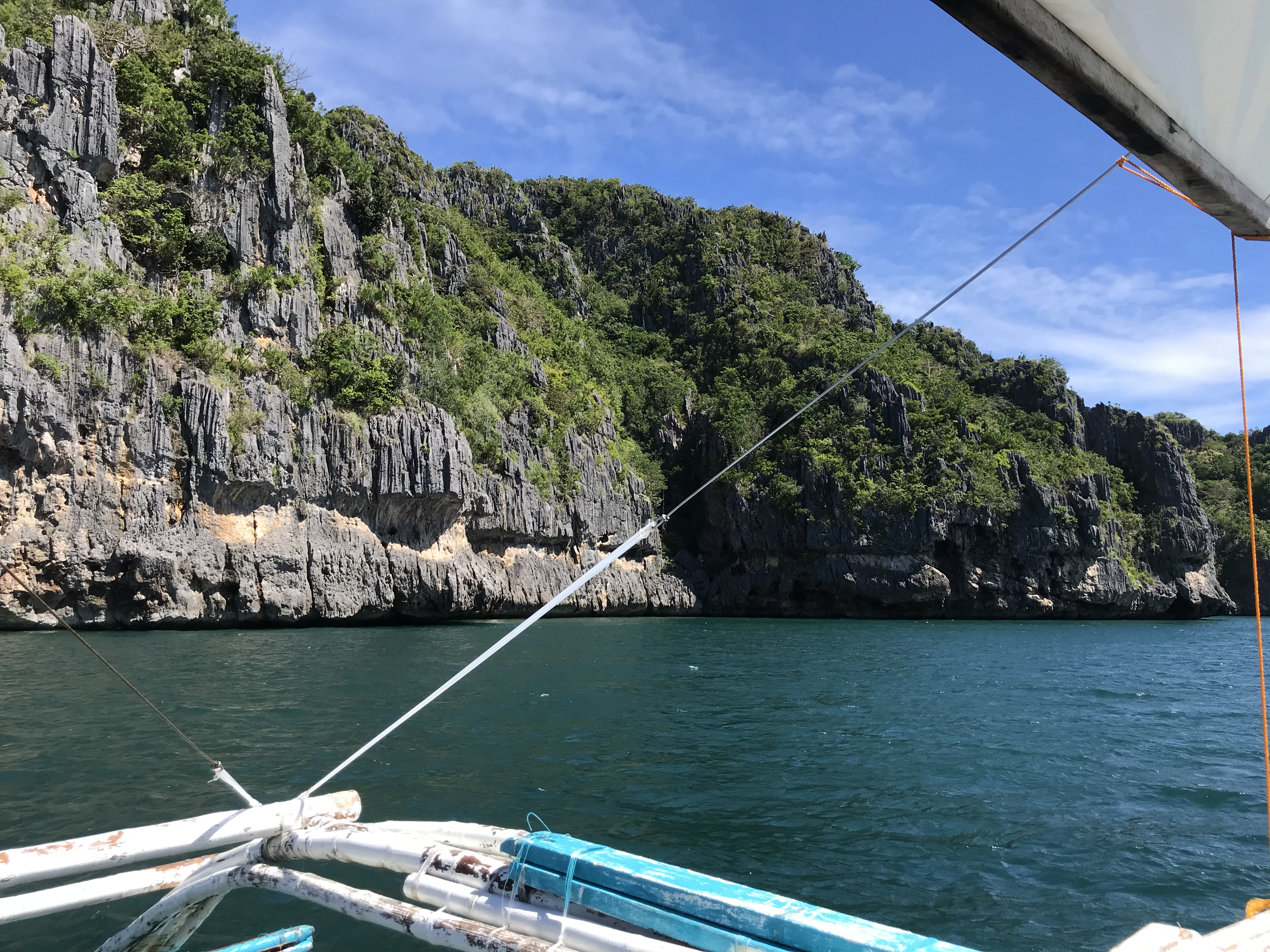
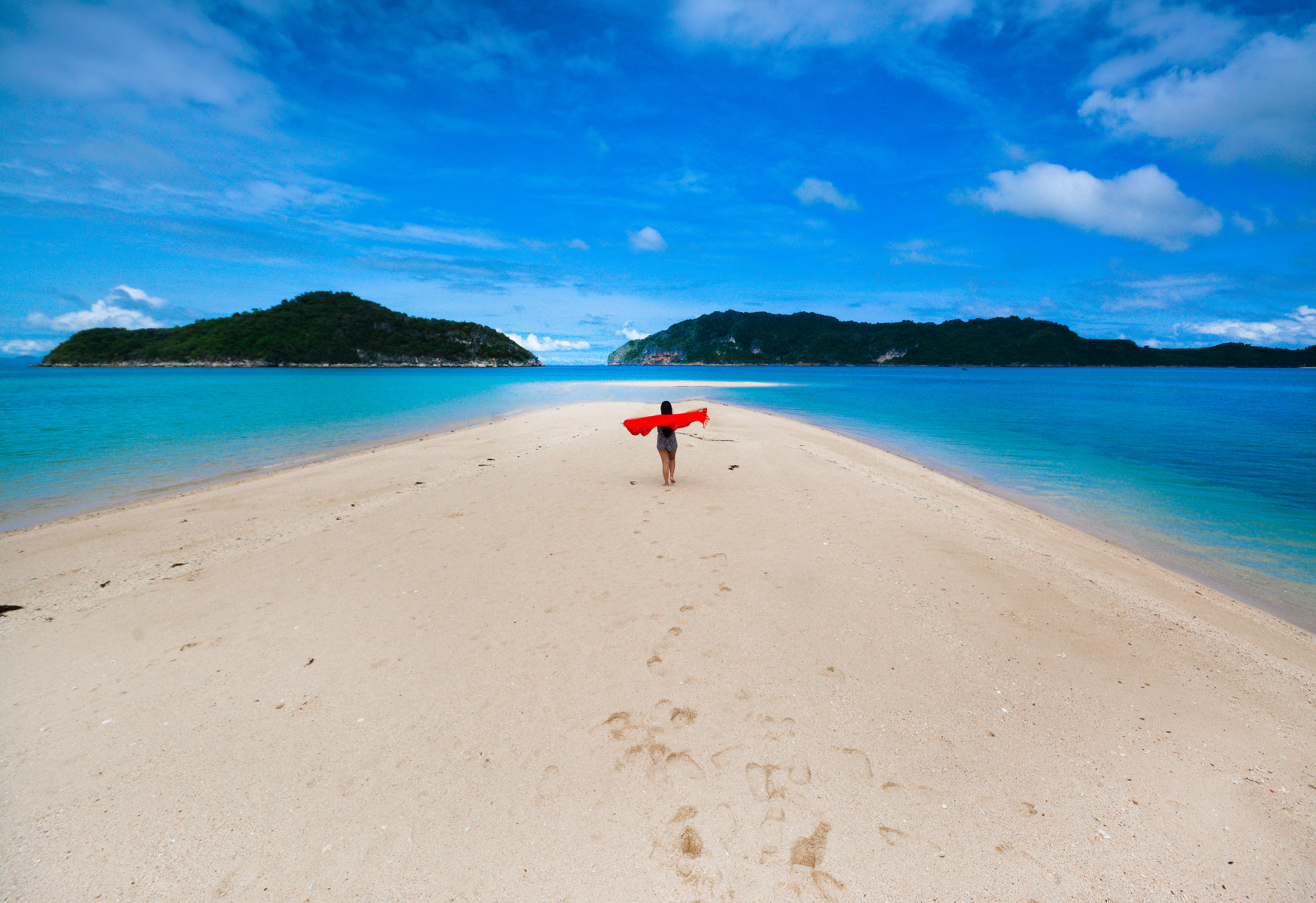
- (from top: left to right) Cabugao Gamay Island, Tumaguin Islet, Islas de Gigantes limestone cliff and Bantigue Sandbar.

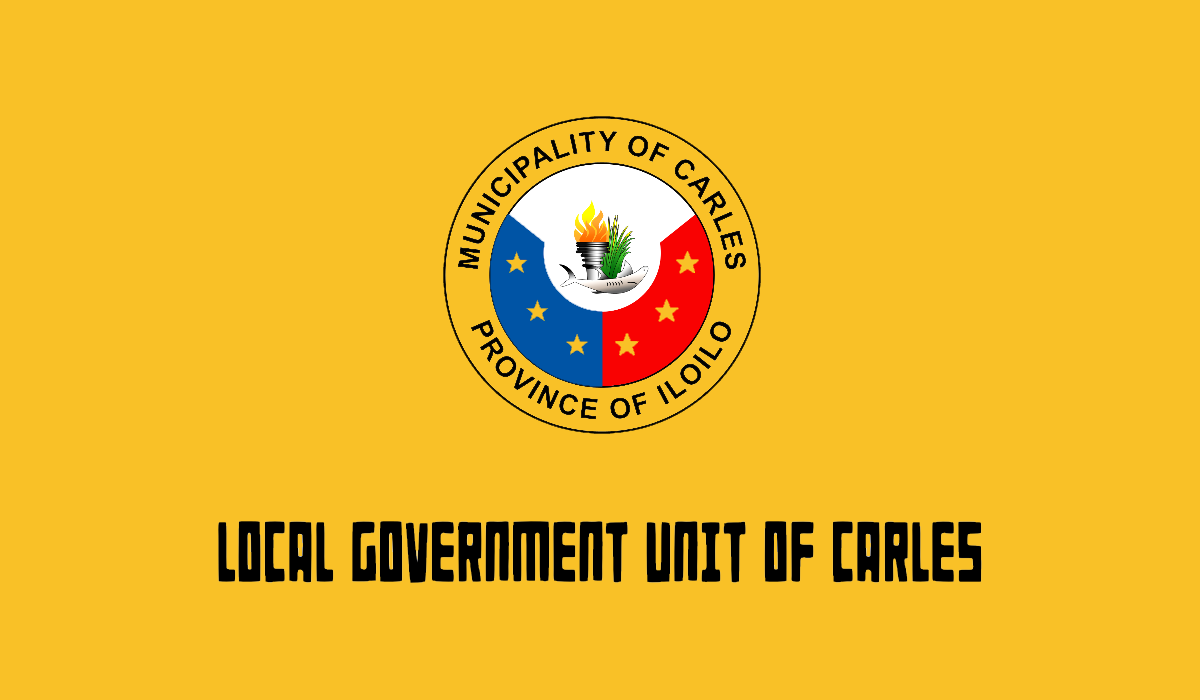
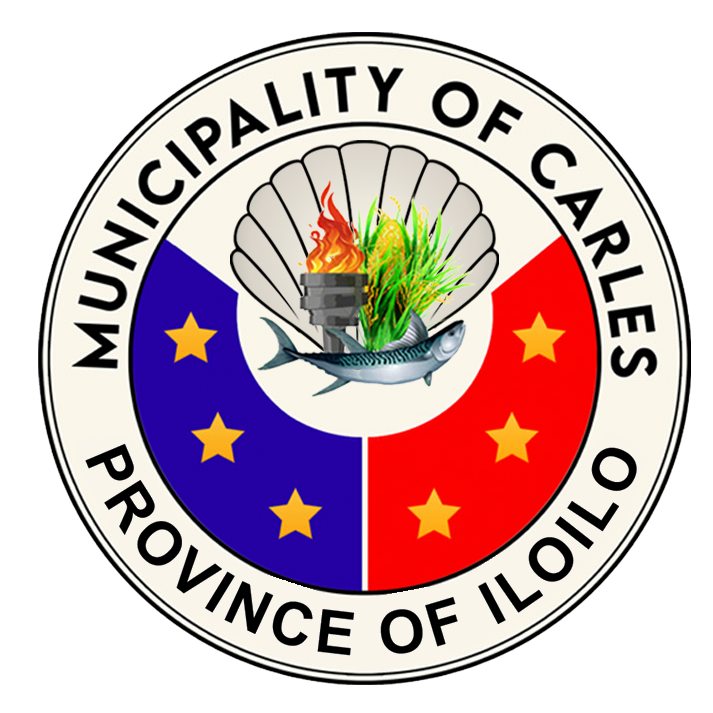
- Flag Seal
- Nickname: Alaska of the Philippines
- Motto: Carles da Best!
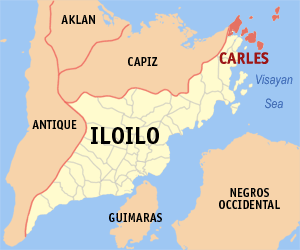
- Map of Iloilo with Carles highlighted
- Interactive map of Carles
- Location within the Philippines
- Coordinates: 11°34′N 123°08′E
- Country: Philippines
- Region: Western Visayas
- Province: Iloilo
- District: 5th district
- Founded: July 1, 1862
- Named for: Jose Maria Dominguez Carles
- Barangays: 33 (see Barangays)

Government
  - Type: Sangguniang Bayan
  - Mayor: Arnold T. Betita II (Lakas)
  - Vice Mayor: Earl Patrick A. Betita (Lakas)
  - Representative: Binky April M. Tupas (Lakas)
  - Municipal Council: Members: Merle B. Tupas (PFP); Regie Ann D. Ibañez (PMP); Jose F. Miane (PFP); Jaspher Martino C. Elvas (Lakas); Cherry B. Villanueva (Lakas); Marlou D. Lopez (Lakas); Leonard H. Abenir (Lakas); Raul I. Betita (PMP); Rowena Grace G. Bensurto ^{‡}; Recca Mae B. Lim ^{◌}; ‡ ex officio ABC president; ◌ ex officio SK chairman
  - Electorate: 46,777 voters (2025)

Area
  - Total: 104.05 km^{2} (40.17 sq mi)
- Elevation: 4.0 m (13.1 ft)
- Highest elevation: 108 m (354 ft)
- Lowest elevation: −1 m (−3.3 ft)

Population (2024 census)
  - Total: 74,177
  - Density: 712.90/km^{2} (1,846.4/sq mi)
  - Households: 17,886

Economy
  - Income class: 1st municipal income class
  - Poverty incidence: 27.26% (2023)
  - Revenue: ₱ 267.3 million (2024)
  - Assets: ₱ 998.6 million (2024)
  - Expenditure: ₱ 231 million (2024)
  - Liabilities: ₱ 312.6 million (2024)

Service provider
  - Electricity: Iloilo 3 Electric Cooperative (ILECO 3)
- Time zone: UTC+8 (PST)
- ZIP code: 5019
- PSGC: 0603014000
- IDD : area code: +63 (0)33
- Native languages: Hiligaynon; Capisnon; Tagalog

Carles, officially the Municipality of Carles (Hiligaynon: Banwa sang Carles, Tagalog: Bayan ng Carles), is a municipality in the province of Iloilo, Philippines. According to the 2024 census, it has a population of 74,177 people.

The town is located on Panay Island, and known for its famous rich fishing grounds. The municipality is also known for popular tourist attractions such as the Islas de Gigantes, Sicogon Island, and Cabugao Gamay Island.

== History ==
=== Spanish colonial era ===
Settlers first arrived circa 1846 and cleared an area at Punta Bulakawe, north of the current poblacion. Following an influx of settlers from Aklan and Antique, the settlement fell under Pueblo de Pilar, Capiz. About 10 years later, the settlement was transferred to the lowland and renamed to Badiang.

In 1860, the first attempt was made to convert the barrio into a municipality but the provincial government of Capiz refused. Because of this refusal, the town leaders petitioned the governor of Iloilo, Governor Jose Maria Carles y Dominguez, who approved the petition. On July 1, 1862, the new pueblo was inaugurated and renamed to Carles, in honor to the governor. First Gobernadorcillo was Alenjandro Buaya.

=== American colonial era ===
On January 1, 1904, the Municipio de Carles was demoted from a status of a barrio to the status of a Barrio Balasan. This incident disheartened some Carleseños who migrated to other towns and provinces. But among those who stayed on were the strong willed ones who struggled hard to make Carles an independent municipality. Headed by Casimiro Andrada, the Carles Separation Movement succeeded in getting the approval of the Carleseños petition for separation from Balasan on January 1, 1920. Federico A. Ramos was appointed as the first Municipal President of Carles. It was during the incumbency of Municipal President Enrico Ilanga that the title of the municipal head was changed to Municipal Mayor.

=== Typhoon Haiyan ===
Carles was heavily damaged by Typhoon Haiyan. Buildings were destroyed and more than 1,200 people were displaced by the storm.

== Geography ==
Carles is the northernmost municipality in the province and is 142 kilometres (88 mi) from the provincial capital, Iloilo City, 71 kilometres (44 mi) from Roxas City, and 141 kilometres (88 mi) from Kalibo.

=== Barangays ===
Carles is politically subdivided into 33 Barangays. Each barangay consists of puroks and some have sitios.

- Abong
- Alipata (Sicogon Island)
- Asluman (Gigantes Norte)
- Bancal
- Barangcalan
- Barosbos
- Punta Batuanan
- Binuluangan
- Bito-on
- Bolo
- Buaya (Sicogon Island)
- Buenavista
- Isla De Cana
- Cabilao Grande
- Cabilao Pequeño
- Cabuguana
- Cawayan
- Dayhagan
- Gabi (Gigantes Sur)
- Granada (Gigantes Norte)
- Guinticgan
- Lantangan (Gigantes Sur)
- Manlot (Manlot Island)
- Nalumsan
- Pantalan
- Poblacion
- Punta (Bolocawe)
- San Fernando (Sicogon Island)
- Tabugon
- Talingting
- Tarong
- Tinigban
- Tupaz

==== Islands ====
Eighteen of Carles's barangays are spread out over fourteen islands and minor islets. The islands under Carles's political jurisdiction include:

- Balbagon Island
- Binuluangan Island
- Calagna-an Island
- Cabugao Gamay Island
- Gigantes Norte
- Gigantes Sur
- Himamylan Island
- Linadlaran Island
- Manigonigo Island
- Manlot Island
- Nabunot Island
- Sicogon Island
- Talunan-an Island
- Tomaquin Island

=== Climate ===
Climate data for Carles, Iloilo
Month	Jan	Feb	Mar	Apr	May	Jun	Jul	Aug	Sep	Oct	Nov	Dec	Year
Mean daily maximum °C (°F)	27 (81)	28 (82)	29 (84)	31 (88)	32 (90)	31 (88)	30 (86)	30 (86)	29 (84)	29 (84)	29 (84)	27 (81)	29 (85)
Mean daily minimum °C (°F)	23 (73)	23 (73)	23 (73)	24 (75)	25 (77)	25 (77)	24 (75)	24 (75)	24 (75)	24 (75)	24 (75)	23 (73)	24 (75)
Average precipitation mm (inches)	61 (2.4)	39 (1.5)	46 (1.8)	48 (1.9)	90 (3.5)	144 (5.7)	152 (6.0)	145 (5.7)	163 (6.4)	160 (6.3)	120 (4.7)	90 (3.5)	1,258 (49.4)
Average rainy days	12.3	9.0	9.9	10.0	18.5	25.0	27.4	26.0	25.9	24.9	17.9	14.2	221
Source: Meteoblue (Use with caution: this is modeled/calculated data, not measured locally.)

== Demographics ==
Population census of Carles
Year	Pop.	±% p.a.
1903	6,676	—
1939	12,185	+1.69%
1948	18,547	+4.78%
1960	20,006	+0.63%
1970	24,501	+2.05%
1975	27,887	+2.63%
1980	32,184	+2.91%
1990	42,648	+2.86%
1995	46,218	+1.52%
2000	53,404	+3.15%
2007	57,673	+1.07%
2010	62,690	+3.08%
2015	68,160	+1.61%
2020	72,637	+1.35%
2024	74,177	+0.50%
Source: Philippine Statistics Authority

In the 2024 census, the population of Carles was 74,177 people, with a density of 710 inhabitants per square kilometre or 1,800 inhabitants per square mile.

== Economy ==
Poverty incidence of Carles (%)

Source: Philippine Statistics Authority

Carles is the 14th wealthiest town in Iloilo (based on income) in 2009, with an income total of P70,475,987 (2009) The agricultural produce of the town includes fish, prawn, crab, rice, corn, sugar, cattle and poultry. Other industries include bakeries, shell craft and wood furniture.

=== Maritime resources ===
Carles is a center for commercial fishing. It carries the name 'Alaska of the Philippines' in reference to the area's marine biological resources and diversity. Carles's water territory lies in the Visayan Sea triangle, also known as the Sulu-Sulawesi triangle. Commercial species are harvested along Carles' waters, including mackerel, barracuda, sardines, shad, pompano, grouper, squid, cuttlefish, shrimp, prawns, shells, seaweed and others.

== Tourism ==
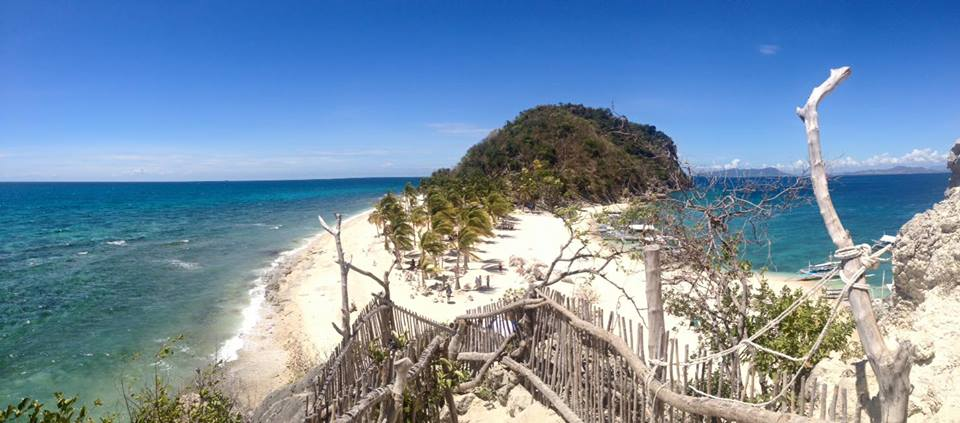
Landmark on Islas de Gigantes in Carles

=== Gigantes Group of Islands ===
One tourist destination in Western Visayas is the Islas de Gigantes or Higantes Group of Islands located in the second class municipality of Carles in northern Iloilo. The Gigantes group of islands in Carles, Iloilo are endowed with limestone forests, caves, and white-sand beaches. It is classified as a high urgent conservation priority under the Philippine Biodiversity Conservation Priority-Setting Program (PBCPP). It is home to a variety of species, two of them endemic: the Gekkonid Lizard (Gekko gigante) and the Island Forest Frog (Platymantis insulatus).

=== Sicogon Island ===
Sicogón is an island in northern Iloilo, which is part of the municipality of Carles. It is named after cogon, a type of grass found in abundance on the island. According to the 2010 census, it has a population of 5,238.

Sicogon was a popular tourist destination during the 1970s, known for its clear waters and white sand beach lined with coconut trees. However, due to the situation caused by martial law, development stalled and Sicogon's popularity faded in favor of Boracay Island.

=== Municipal Tourism Center ===
Located at Bancal Port is a tourist assistance, boat reservation, registration and payment center. The tourism center also regulates the rates and accredits the boats for the Gigantes tours. Souvenir items can also be found in the center.

== Infrastructure ==
=== Air ===
Iloilo International Airport (IATA: ILO, ICAO: RPVI) serves the city of Iloilo as well as the province of Iloilo. It receives flights from Manila, Cebu, Clark, Cagayan de Oro, Davao City, Dumaguete, General Santos, Legazpi, Tacloban, Tagbilaran, Puerto Princesa, Zamboanga, Singapore and Hong Kong and is served by three airlines; Philippines AirAsia, Cebu Pacific, and Philippine Airlines.

Roxas Airport (IATA: RXS, ICAO: RPVR) is closer to Carles with domestic flights from Cebu and Manila.

Sicogon Airport (IATA: ICO, ICAO: RPSG) is the first and only airport in Carles and Northern Iloilo with domestic flights from and to Manila, serving the general area of Sicogon Island.

=== Land ===
Jeepneys and tricycles are the common public land transport with route Carles-Balasan and vice versa. The route Carles-Iloilo City and vice versa, and Carles-Roxas City and vice versa is served by Ceres Liner while Carles-Metro Manila and vice versa is served by Dimple Star Bus.

=== Sea ===
Pumboats are used for traversing the water between the Islands of Carles and it's mainland with Estancia. Bancal port serves as the gateway to the Gigantes Islands.

'Bancal Fish Port' is the main fish-landing port in the municipality and is where fish catches from Iloilo, other provinces like Panay, Masbate and Romblon are unloaded daily.

== Education ==
The Carles Schools District Office governs all educational institutions within the municipality. It oversees the management and operations of all private and public, from primary to secondary schools.

=== Primary and elementary schools ===
- Abong Elementary School
- Alipata Elementary School
- Asluman Elementary School
- Bagacay SDA Multigrade School
- Bancal Integrated School
- Barosbos Elementary School
- Bito-on Elementary School
- BOLO Elementary School
- Buaya Elementary School
- Cabilao Elementary School
- Caña Primary School
- Carles Central School
- Cawayan Baptist Learning Center
- Cawayan Elementary School
- Cawayan Primary School
- Dayhagan Elementary School
- Gabi Elementary School
- Granada Elementary School
- Guinticgan Elementary School
- Lantangan Elementary School
- Naborot Elementary School
- Pantalan Elementary School
- Piaggio Primary School
- Punta Elementary School
- San Fernando Elementary School
- Sicogon SDA Multigrade School
- Talingting Elementary School
- Tarong Elementary School
- Tunga Elementary School
- Tupaz Elementary School

=== Secondary schools ===
- Barangcalan Integrated School
- Batuan Integrated School
- Batuanan Integrated School
- Binuluangan Integrated School
- Buenavista Integrated School
- Don Casimero Andrada National High School
- Fidel Zarceno National High School
- Granada National High School
- Granada National High School (Ballesteros Campus)
- Manlot Integrated School
- San Fernando National High School
- Tabugon Integrated School
- Talingting National High School
- Tinigban Integrated School
- Toong Integrated School

== Media ==
- 92.1 MHz Radyo Timbo-ok (DYCO)

== Gallery ==
Old Spanish lighthouse in Naburot Island

One of Carles' islets visited by tourists in the summer season

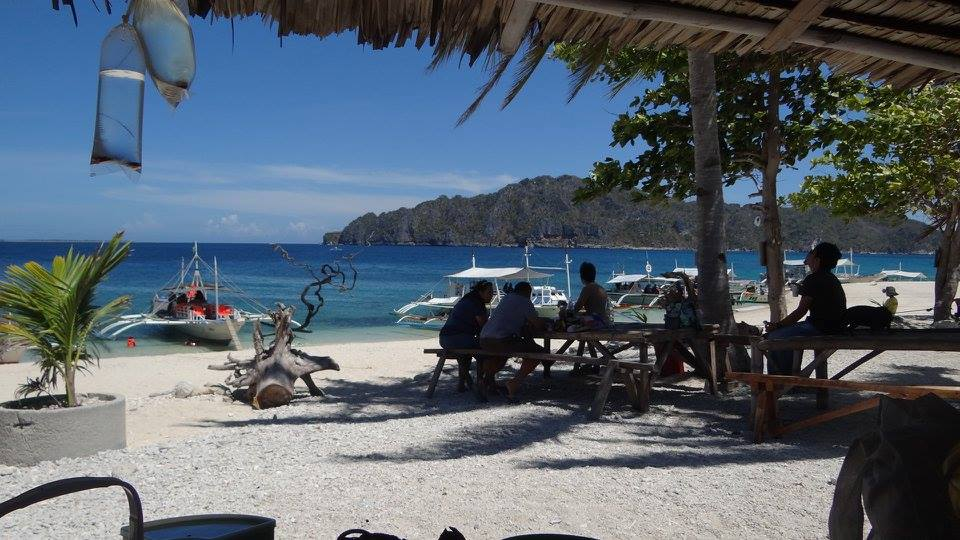
A typical resort in the islands of Carles

Bantigue Island's sandbar during low tide.

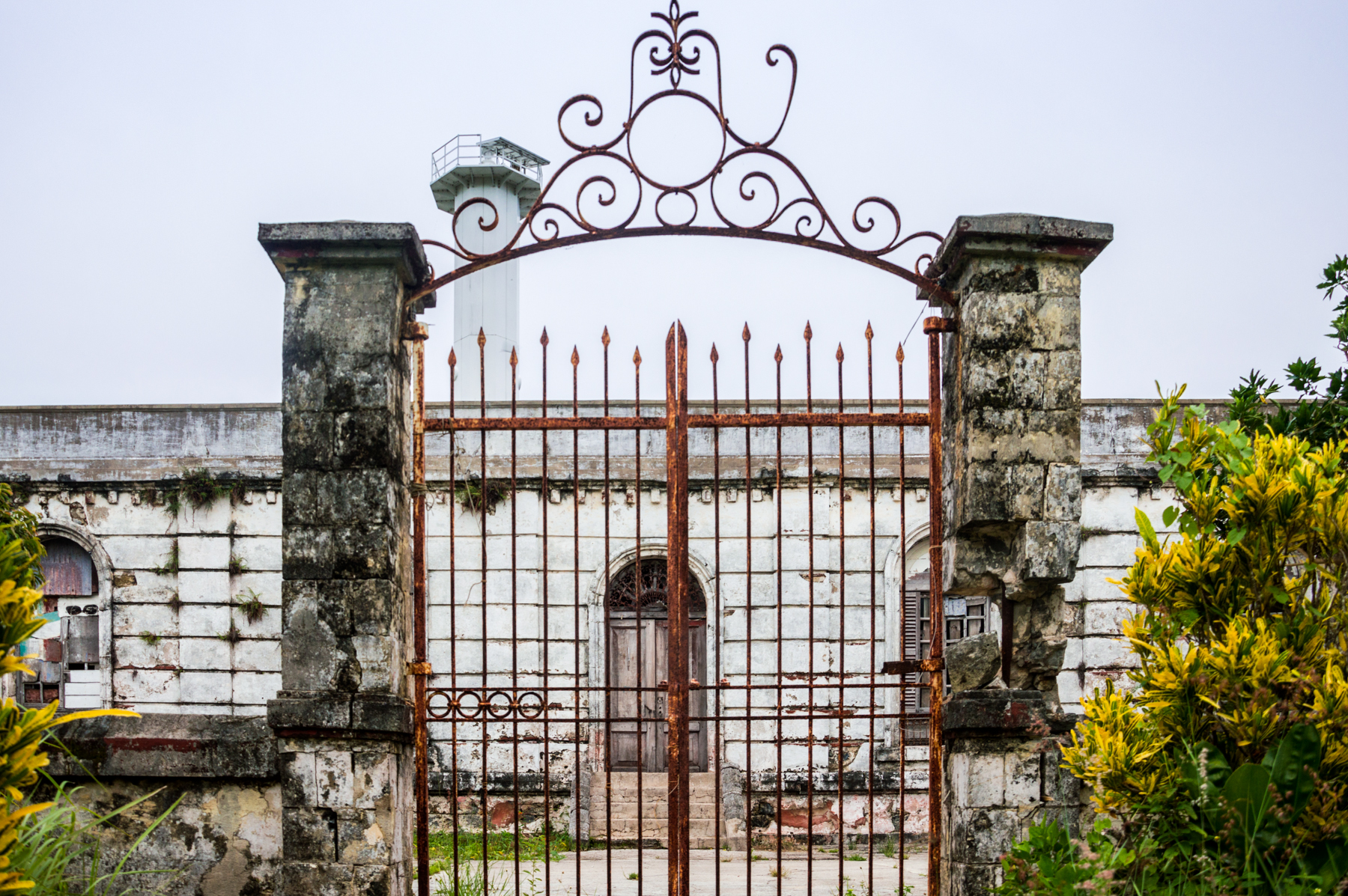
Gate ruin of the town's lighthouse

Hidden lagoon locally known as 'Tanque/Tangke'

Infinity pool in one of Barangay Guinticgan's resorts

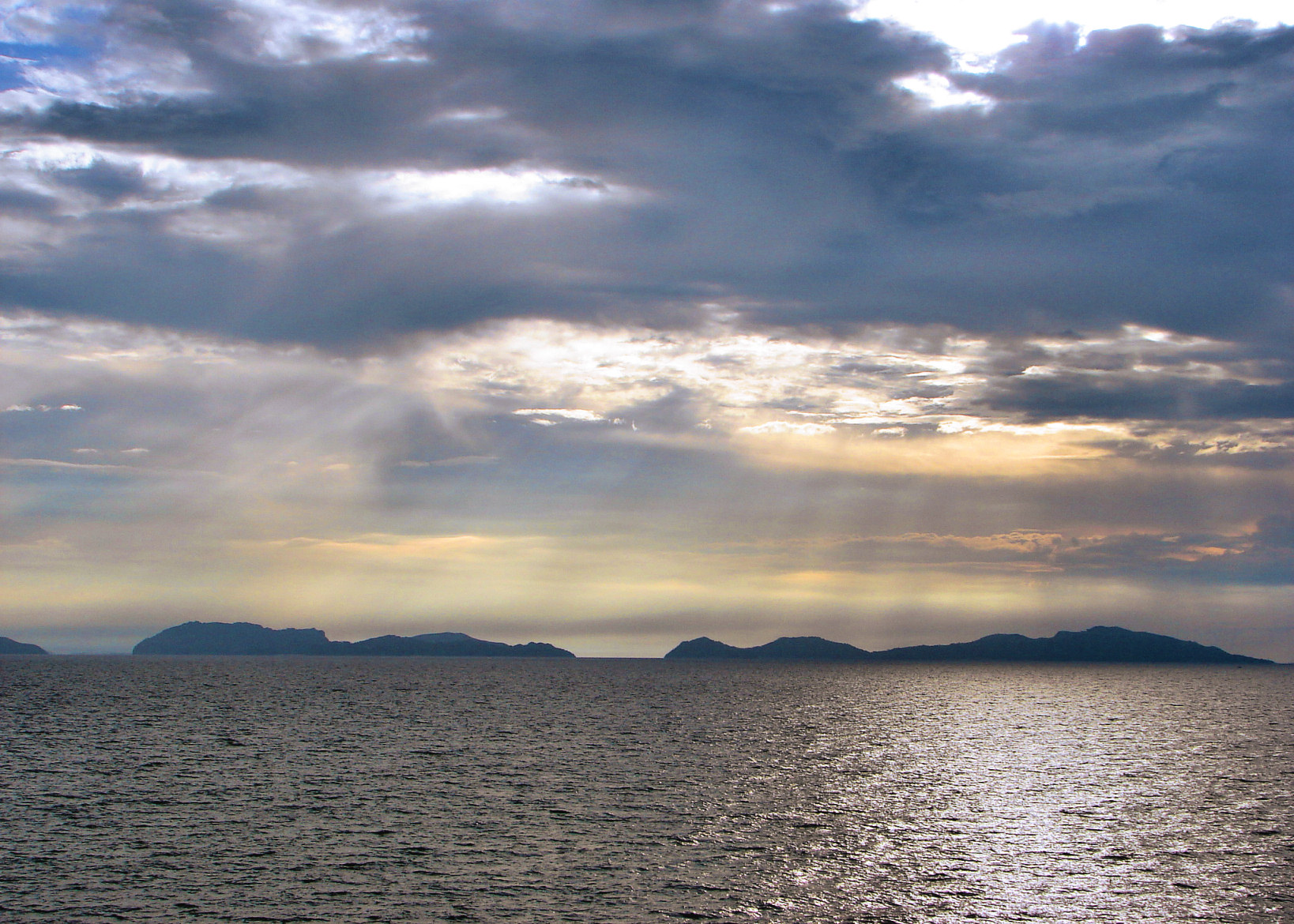
North and South Gigante Islands seen from the Visayan Sea

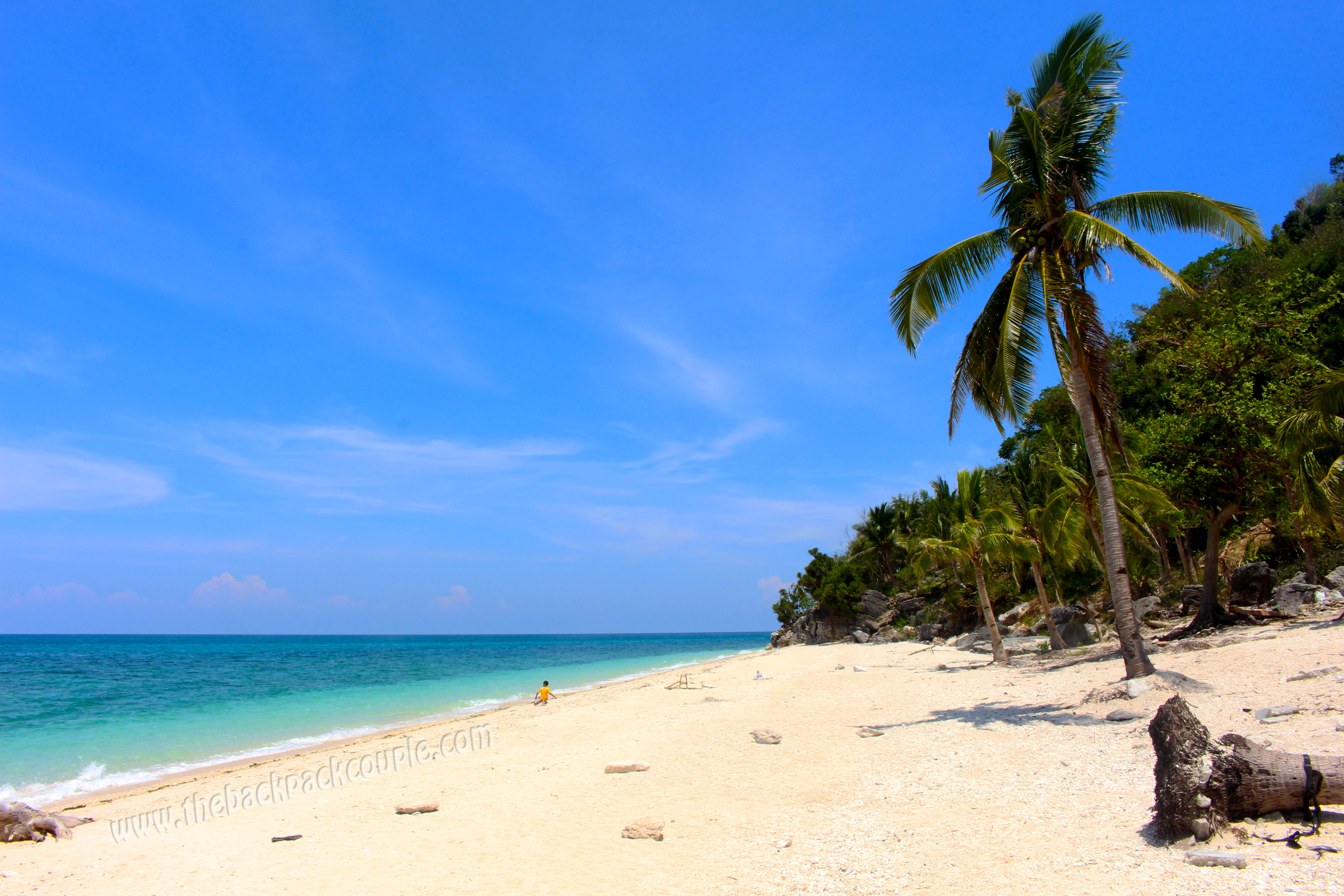
Antonia Beach
