= Masbate Island =

Province and island in the Philippines

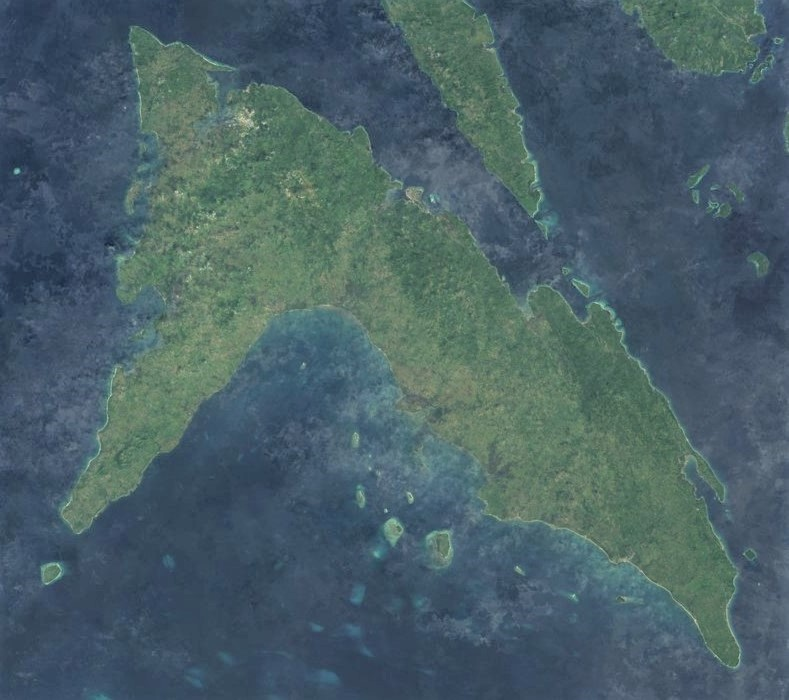
- Masbate island satellite image captured by Sentinel-2 in 2016

- Location within Philippines

Geography
- Coordinates: 12°18′N 123°30′E
- Adjacent to: Asid Gulf; Jintotolo Channel; Masbate Pass; Samar Sea; Sibuyan Sea; Visayan Sea
- Area: 3,268 km^{2} (1,262 sq mi)
- Highest elevation: 684 m (2244 ft)
- Highest point: Conical Peak

Administration
- Philippines
- Region: Bicol Region
- Province: Masbate
- Largest settlement: Masbate City (pop. 104,522)

Demographics
- Population: 732,518 (2024)
- Ethnic groups: Masbateño; Ilonggo; Waray; Cebuano

Masbate Island is the largest of three major islands of Masbate Province in the Philippines. The other two major islands are Ticao Island and Burias Island. It is the 11th-largest island in both area and population in the Philippines and the world's 155th largest island by area and the world's 70th most populous island. The island is divided into 14 municipalities and 1 city, and has a total population of 732,518 people as of 2024 census. Masbate City is the island's largest settlement with a total population of 104,522 as of 2020.

Masbate Island was severely affected by Super Typhoon Yolanda in November 2013, which caused the evacuation of about 15,700 people.
