= Tanguingui Island =

Islet in Cebu, Philippines

Tanguingui
- Location within Philippines

Geography
- Coordinates: 11°29′16″N 123°43′25″E
- Archipelago: Islas de Gigantes
- Adjacent to: Visayan Sea
- Highest elevation: 6.7 m (22 ft)

Administration
- Philippines
- Region: Central Visayas
- Province: Cebu
- Municipality: Madridejos

Demographics
- Population: uninhabited

Tanguingui (variously Tanguingui Islet and historically Isla Tanguingui) is a small, uninhabited island in the Visayan Sea of the Philippines. Although part of the Islas de Gigantes archipelago, it falls under the jurisdiction of the municipality of Madridejos, Cebu. There is a lighthouse on the island.

== Location and geography ==
Tanguingui is a small cay in the Islas de Gigantes in the Visayan Sea. It is 550 meters long and it is 97 kilometres (60 mi) east of Panay Island and almost directly north of Bantayan Island. Flat and sandy with an elevation of around 6.7 metres (22 ft), it is 36.2 kilometres (22.5 mi) east-southeast of Gigantes Sur, and 18 kilometres (11 mi) north of Buntay Point of Bantayan Island.

== Lighthouse ==
According to the Faros Españoles de Ultramar, Tanguingui was one of the 27 major lighthouses of the Philippines during the Spanish occupation of the Philippines. In 1903, the US government built a 45-foot-high (14 m) lighthouse on Tanguingui. The current lighthouse is a black steel structure 113 feet (34 m) high.

== See also ==
- Lighthouses in the Philippines
- List of islands in the Philippines
- Desert island
