= El Nido Airport =

Airport serving El Nido, Palawan, Philippines

El Nido Airport Paliparan ng El Nido Hulugpaan sang El Nido
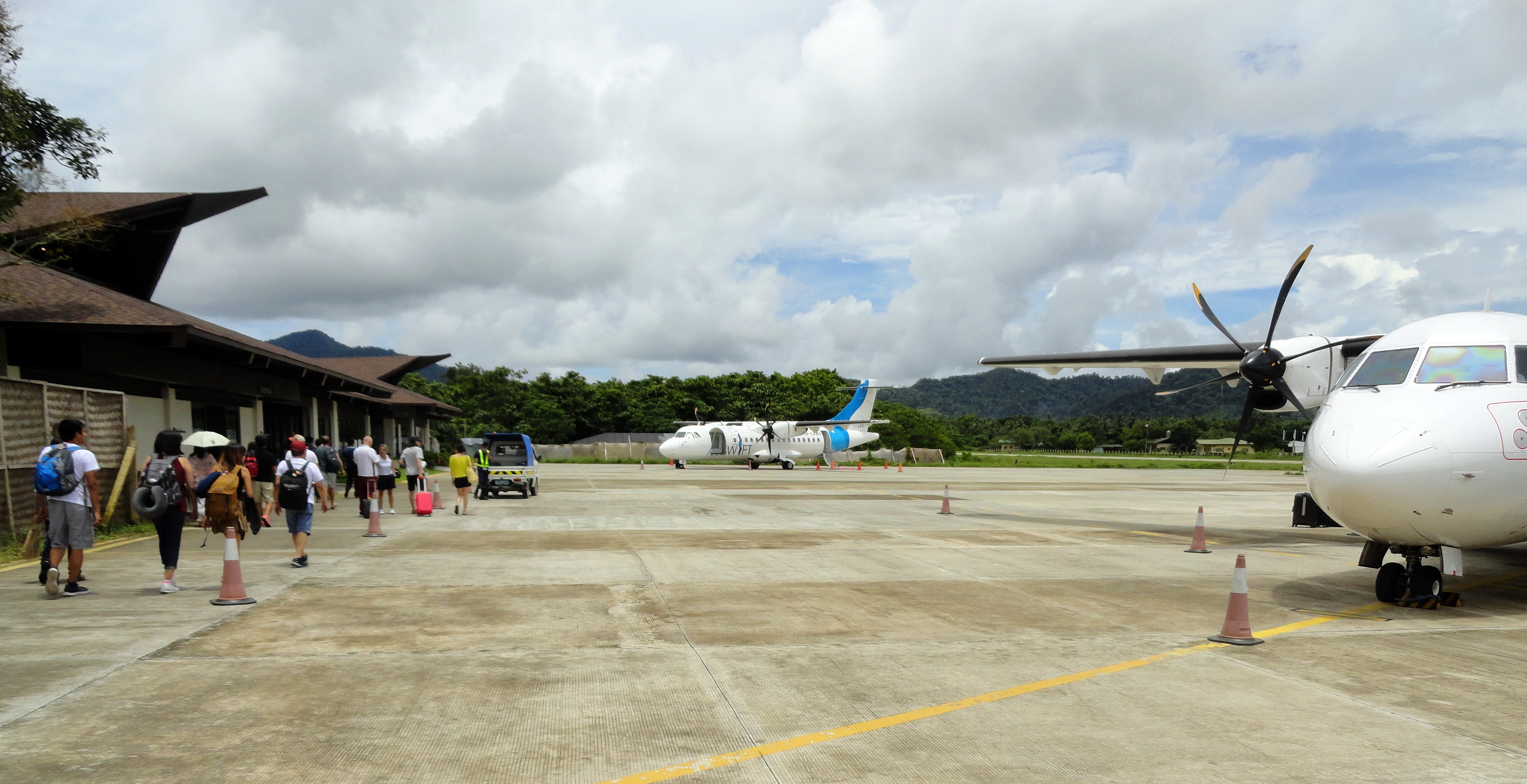
- Apron of El Nido Airport
- IATA: ENI; ICAO: RPEN

Summary
- Airport type: Private
- Owner: Cebu Pacific
- Operator: Ten Knots Development Corp.
- Serves: El Nido
- Location: Barangay Villa Libertad, El Nido, Palawan
- Operating base for: Cebgo
- Coordinates: 11°12′07″N 119°25′01″E

Map
- Location in the Philippines

Runways
Direction	Length		Surface
Direction	m	ft	Surface
15/33	1,000	3,280	Concrete

El Nido Airport (Note: Filipino: Paliparan ng El Nido, Hiligaynon: Hulugpaan sang El Nido) (IATA: ENI), also known as Lio Airport, is an airport serving the general area of El Nido, located in the province of Palawan in the Philippines. It is located in the barangay of Villa Libertad, about 4 kilometres (2 mi) from the poblacion (town proper) of El Nido. This concrete airstrip is owned and operated by Cebu Pacific. The gravel runway is now partially coated and used as a taxiway for aircraft.

== Airlines and destinations ==
Airlines	Destinations
Cebgo	Busuanga, Caticlan, Cebu, Clark, Tagbilaran
