= Gigantes Islands =

Island chain in the Visayan Sea

Islas de Gigantes
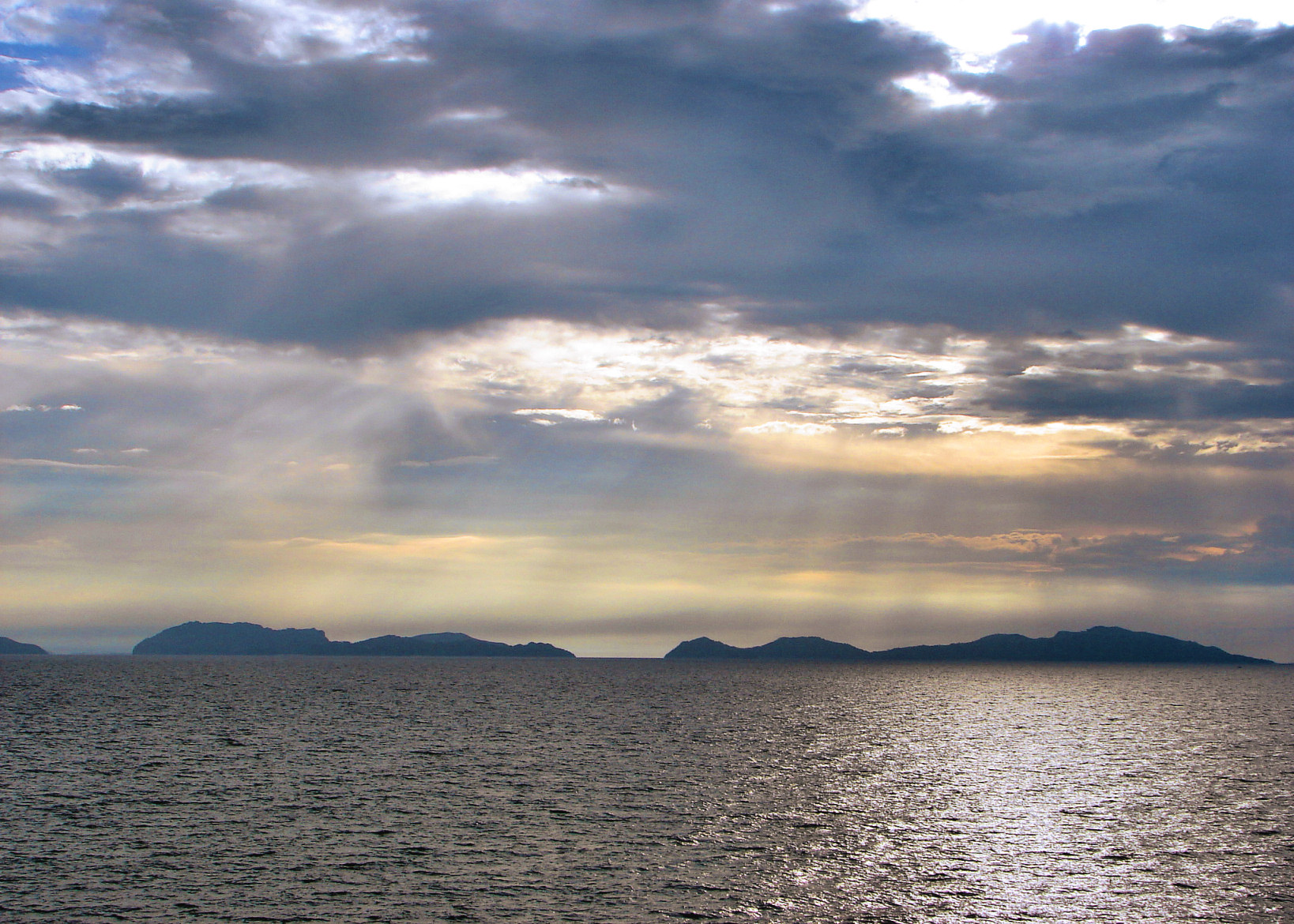
- North and South Gigante Islands seen from the Visayan Sea

- Location within Philippines

Geography
- Coordinates: 11°35′39″N 123°20′11″E
- Adjacent to: Jintotolo Channel; Visayan Sea
- Total islands: 10
- Major islands: Antonia Island; Bantigui Island; Bulubadiang Islet; Cabugao Daku Island; Gigantes Norte; Gigantes Sur; Gigantillo Islet; Gigantuna Islet; Tanguingui Island; Turnina Islet

Administration
- Philippines
- Region: Western Visayas
- Province: Iloilo
- Municipality: Carles
- Barangays: Gigantes Norte: Asluman; Granada; Gigantes Sur: Gabi; Lantangan

Demographics
- Population: 14,332 (2020)

Islas de Gigantes (Spanish: Gigantes Islands lit: Giants' Islands) (variously Islas Gigantes, Higantes group, or Gigantes group) is an island chain within the larger Western Visayas archipelago in the Visayan Sea. It is part of the municipality of Carles in the northernmost part of Iloilo province, Philippines. The Gigantes Islands consist of about ten islands; the two largest are Gigantes Norte (North Gigantes) and Gigantes Sur (South Gigantes). According to the 2020 census, it has a population of 14,332 residents. There is also a lighthouse on Gigantes Norte.

== Location and geography ==
The Gigantes islands are located roughly 18 kilometres (11 mi) from Panay Island in the Visayan Sea. Gigantes Norte is 213 metres (699 ft) at its highest point, while Gigantes Sur is 232 metres (761 ft) at its highest point. A narrow 800-metre-wide (0.5 mi) channel separates the two islands. Nearby islands include Balbagon Island, which is 6 kilometres (3.7 mi) west of Gigantes Sur and is part of the barangay Lantangan.

In addition to the two main islands, the Gigantes group includes the following minor islets: Bulubadiang, Gigantillo, and Gigantuna are islets southeast of Gigantes Norte, while Antonia (Cabugao Gamay), Bantigui, Cabugao Daku, Tanguingui, and Turnina are islands and islets south of Gigantes Sur.

The Gigantes group consists of the following four barangays: on Gigantes Norte is Asluman and Granada and on Gigantes Sur is Lantangan and Gabi.

== History ==
The Gigantes group used to be called Sabuluag, or Salauag, which is the name of a species of tree endemic to the islands. During the Spanish colonial era, the name was changed to Gigantes. Local legend describes coffins found inside Bakwitan Cave that contained gigantic sets of human bones, which constituted the name change. For this reason, locals also believe the island is inhabited by engkantos.

A lighthouse was built on Gigantes Norte sometime before 1895. Designated ARLHS PHI-094, the white 38-foot-high (12 m) tower features a keeper's house and a focal point 77 feet (23 m) in the air, which flashes once every ten seconds. Lantangan Elementary School in Gigantes Sur has a student population of 1,144, which is higher than the populations of mainland schools.

=== Typhoons ===
Typhoon Fengshen, known in the Philippines as Frank, struck the Gigantes group in June 2008. Fengshen destroyed the original lighthouse on Gigantes Norte, which was one of the original 27 lighthouses built by the Spanish in the Philippines. Japan donated a replacement tower, which is made of iron and solar powered. The brick keeper's house is all that remains of the original structure.

Typhoon Haiyan, known in the Philippines as "Yolanda", passed over the Gigantes group, along with the rest of Panay, on November 8, 2013, damaging houses and boats. Unofficial reports stated more than 90 percent of the houses on Gigantes were destroyed. The typhoon also tore the roof off of Lantangan Elementary School in Gigantes Sur. As of June 2014, the roof of the school had not yet been repaired. Many groups conducted relief missions to the Gigantes group, including the Bureau of Fisheries and Aquatic Resources in Region 6 (BFAR-6), the Department of Social Welfare and Development (DSWD-6), RockEd Philippines-RockEd Iloilo, the ABS-CBN Foundation, Loma Linda University Health (LLUH), and the Adventist Development and Relief Agency (ADRA). In June 2014, Save the Children donated more than a thousand bags of school supplies to students on the island. Aside from food and clothing, the fishing community also asked relief organizations to help rebuild their livelihoods.

== Points of interest ==
Points of interest in the Gigantes group include the Cabugao Gamay Island (Antonia Island), Bantigue Sand Bar, and Bakwitan Cave, one of 73 caves throughout the islands.

=== Tangke ===
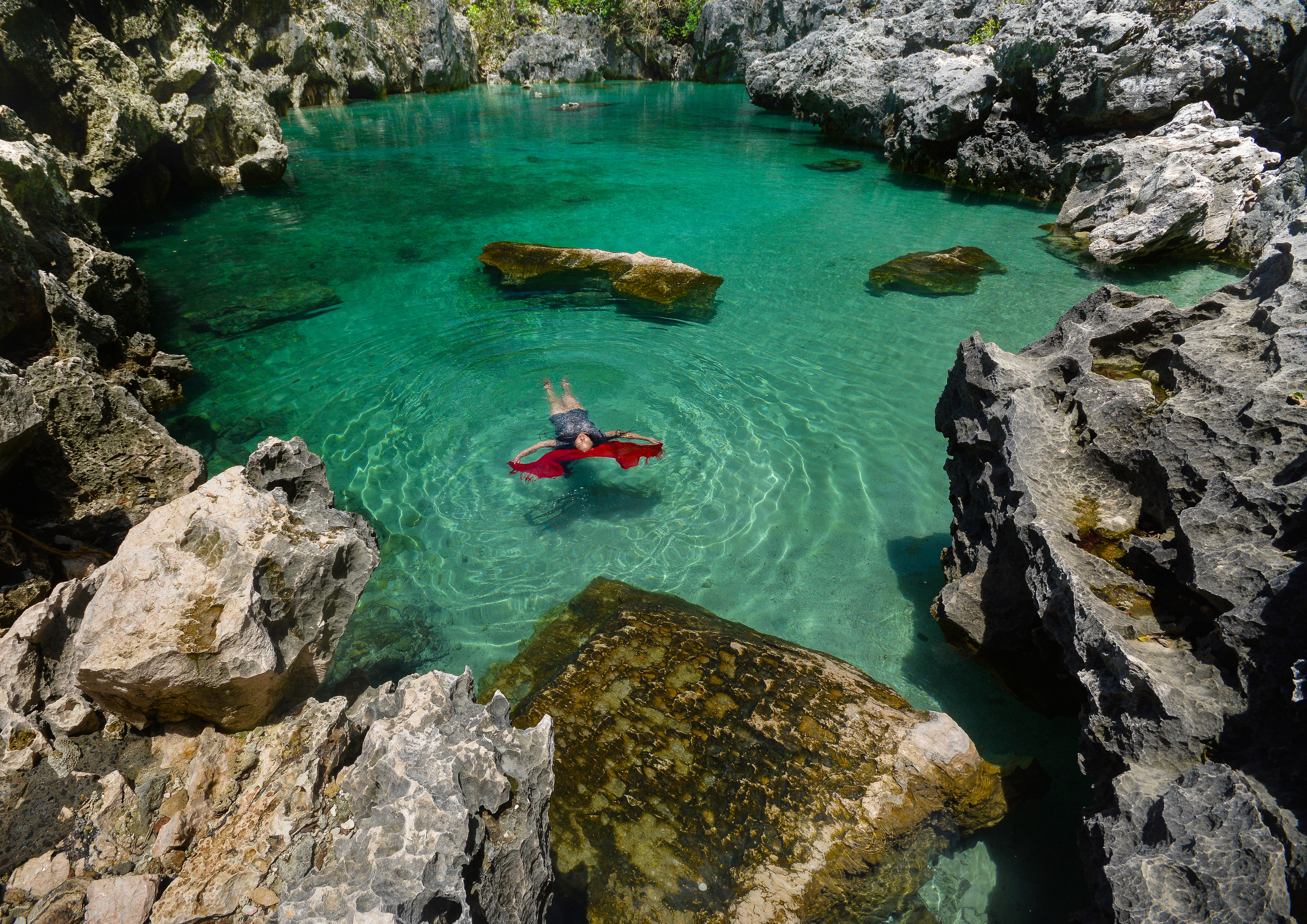
Tangke lagoon

Tangke (“tank”) is a saltwater lagoon on Gigantes Sur. It is surrounded by cliffs. Local legend says that the waters of Tangke would miraculously rise every year on June 24, the Birthday of Saint John the Baptist.

=== North Gigantes Island lighthouse ===
The station was established during 1895 as one of the Spanish lighthouse projects to be built across the Philippines. The current medium-sized lighthouse that is solar-powered, like most of the lighthouses built today, was donated by Japan to replace the one built by the Spanish government due to the destruction brought on by Typhoon Frank in 2008. The keeper's house survived but in ruins. The masonry walls were painted white while the roof was made out of corrugated galvanized iron sheet in red paint finish.

=== Cabugao Gamay ===
A small island featuring a white sand beach and an observation deck.

=== Antonia Beach ===
The private beach which belongs to a resort (Antonia Resort) on the southeastern tip of Gigantes Sur, known for its 1 peso scallops.

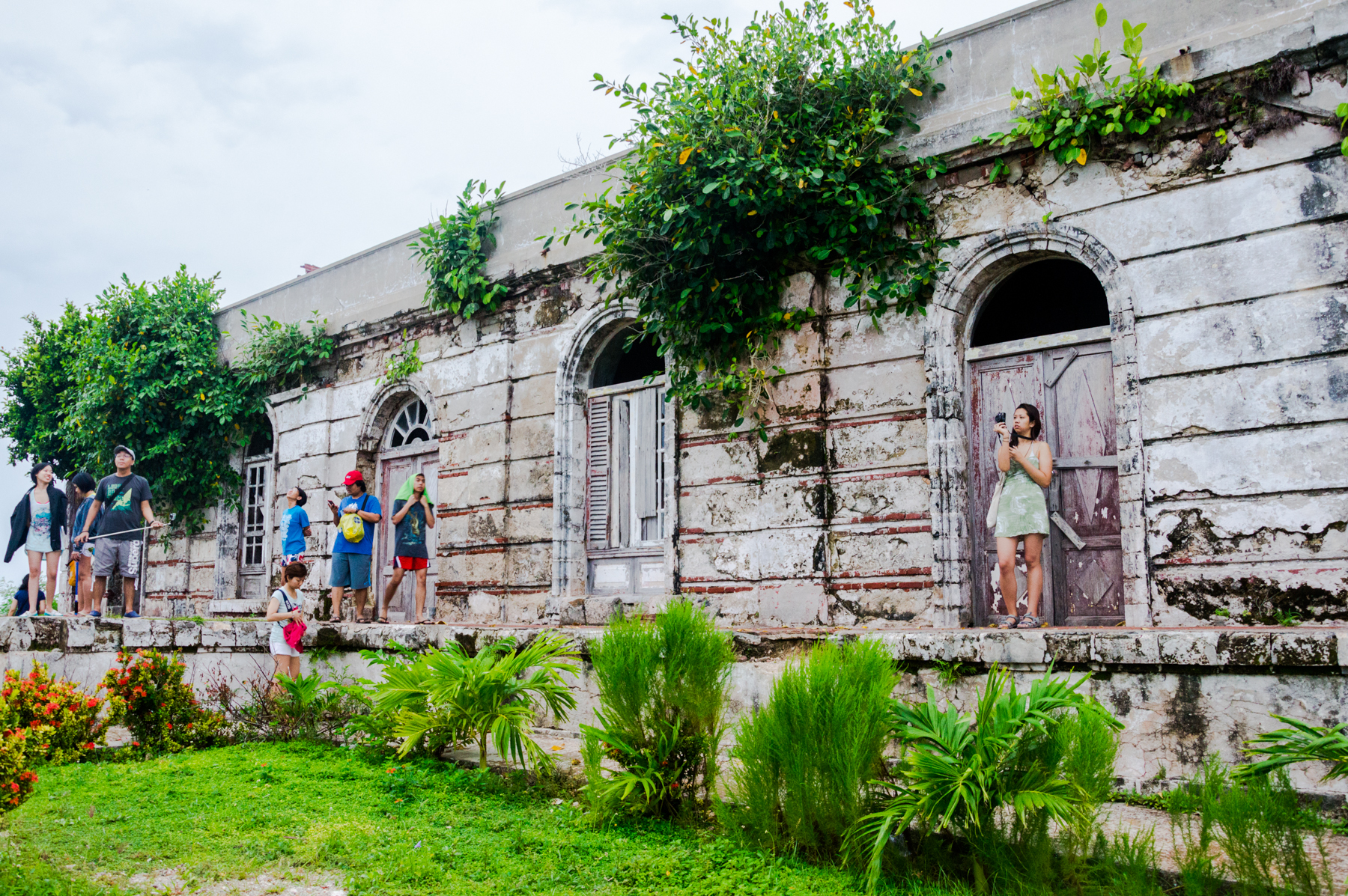
Beside the lighthouse is a single-storey elevated ruin with arched openings on one side

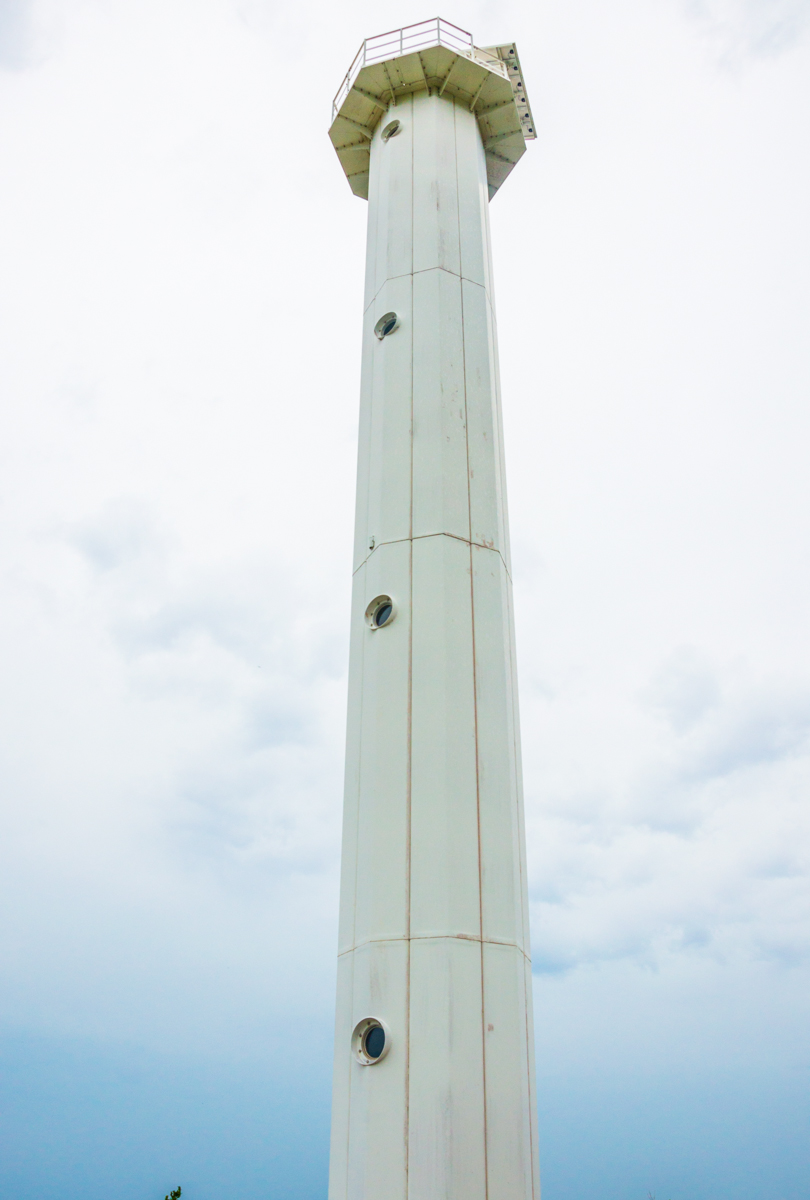
This is the new solar-powered lighthouse which was once the location of the Spanish-colonial parola

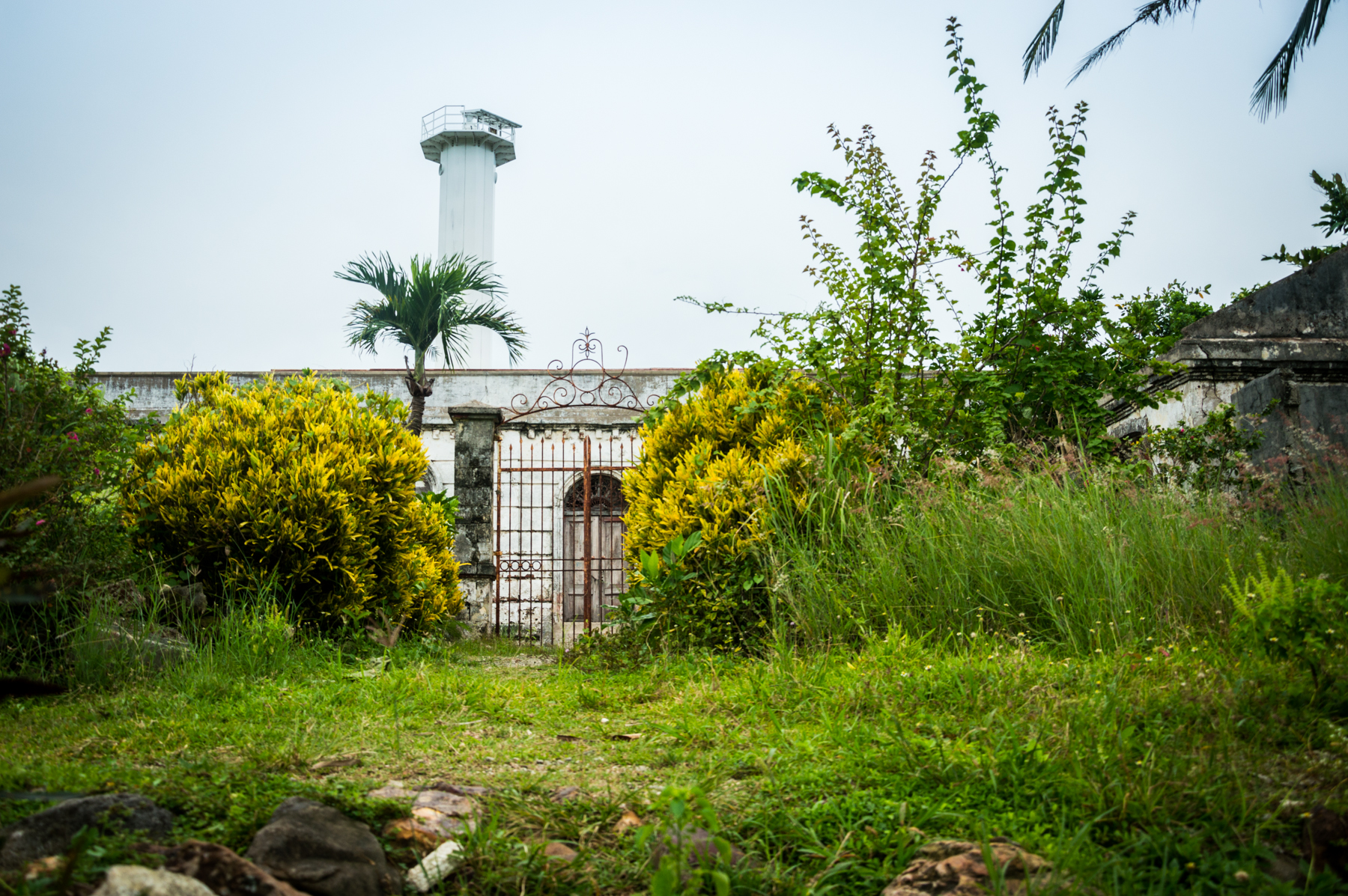
The pathway that leads to the old quarters

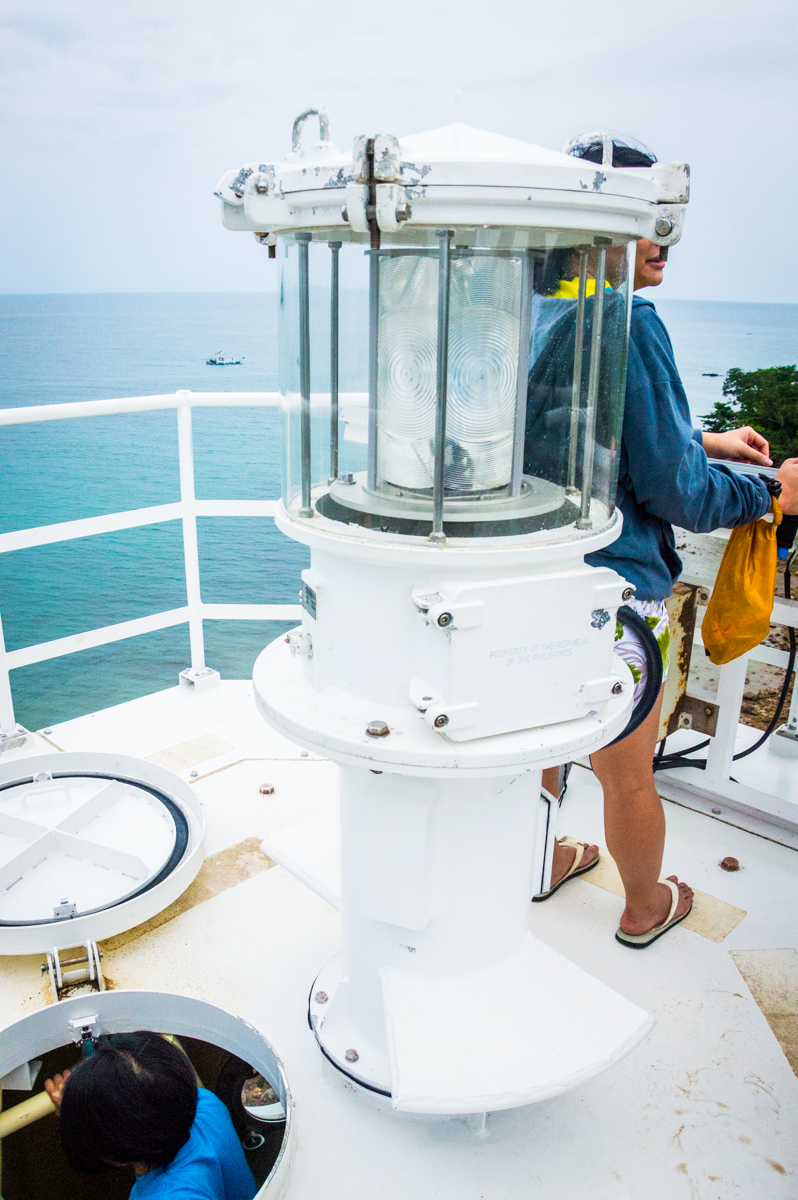
The signal lamp on lighthouse deck

== Transport ==
=== via Carles ===
Boats can be chartered from Bancal Port in Carles. Public ferries leave daily from Bancal Port to either Gigantes Norte or Gigantes Sur. Private boats can also be chartered to reach the islands. It takes approximately an hour from Bancal Port to Gigantes Islands.

=== via Estancia ===
Daily trips are also available from the port of Estancia, which can be reached via point-to-point bus operated by Ceres from their terminal just outside Iloilo City. The single trip leaves at approximately 1300 hours daily and takes about 1.5-2 hours to complete.

== Gallery ==
Gigantes Norte Limestone Cliffs

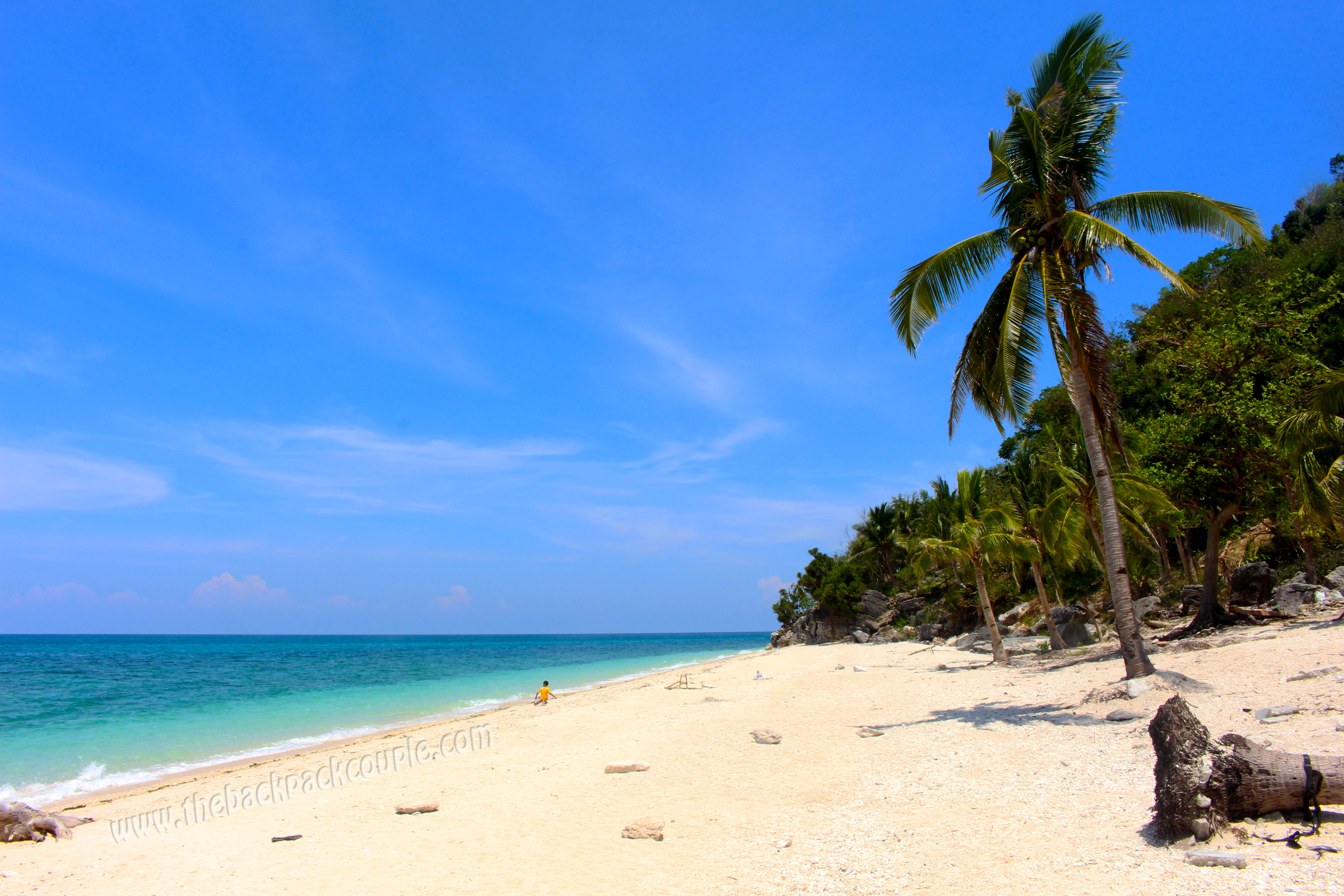
A white sand beach at Antonia Island

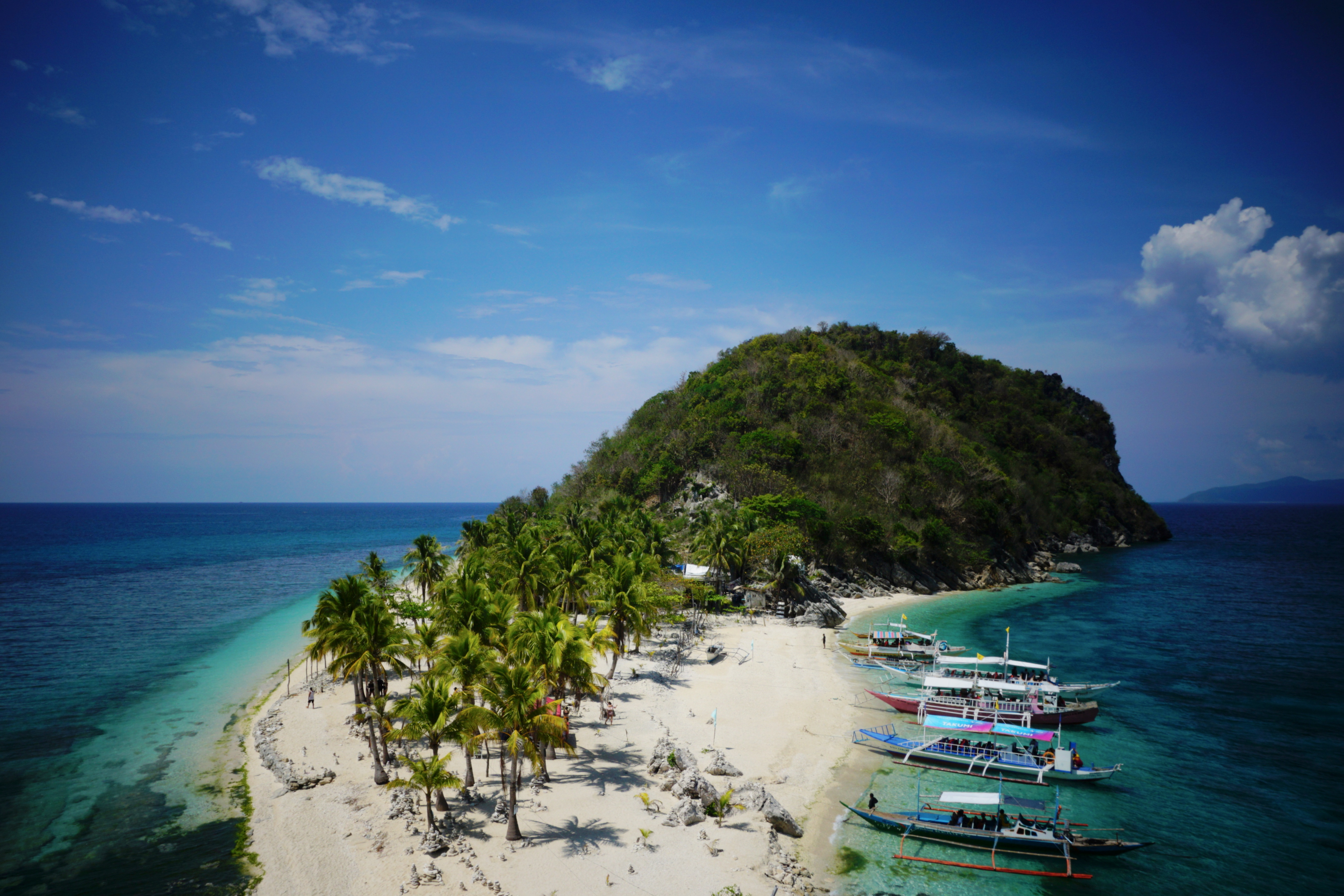
Cabugao Gamay Island

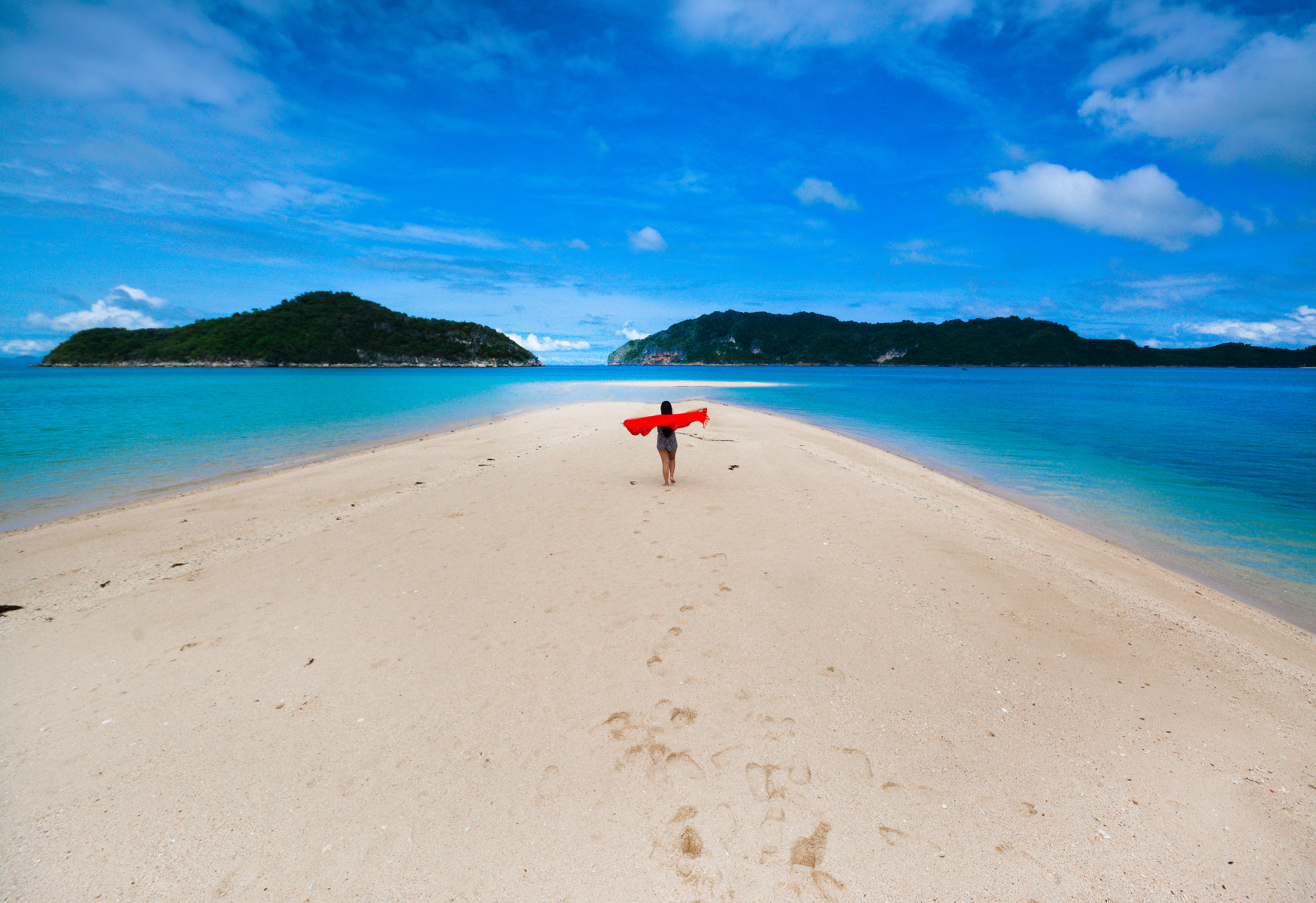
Bantigue Sandbar

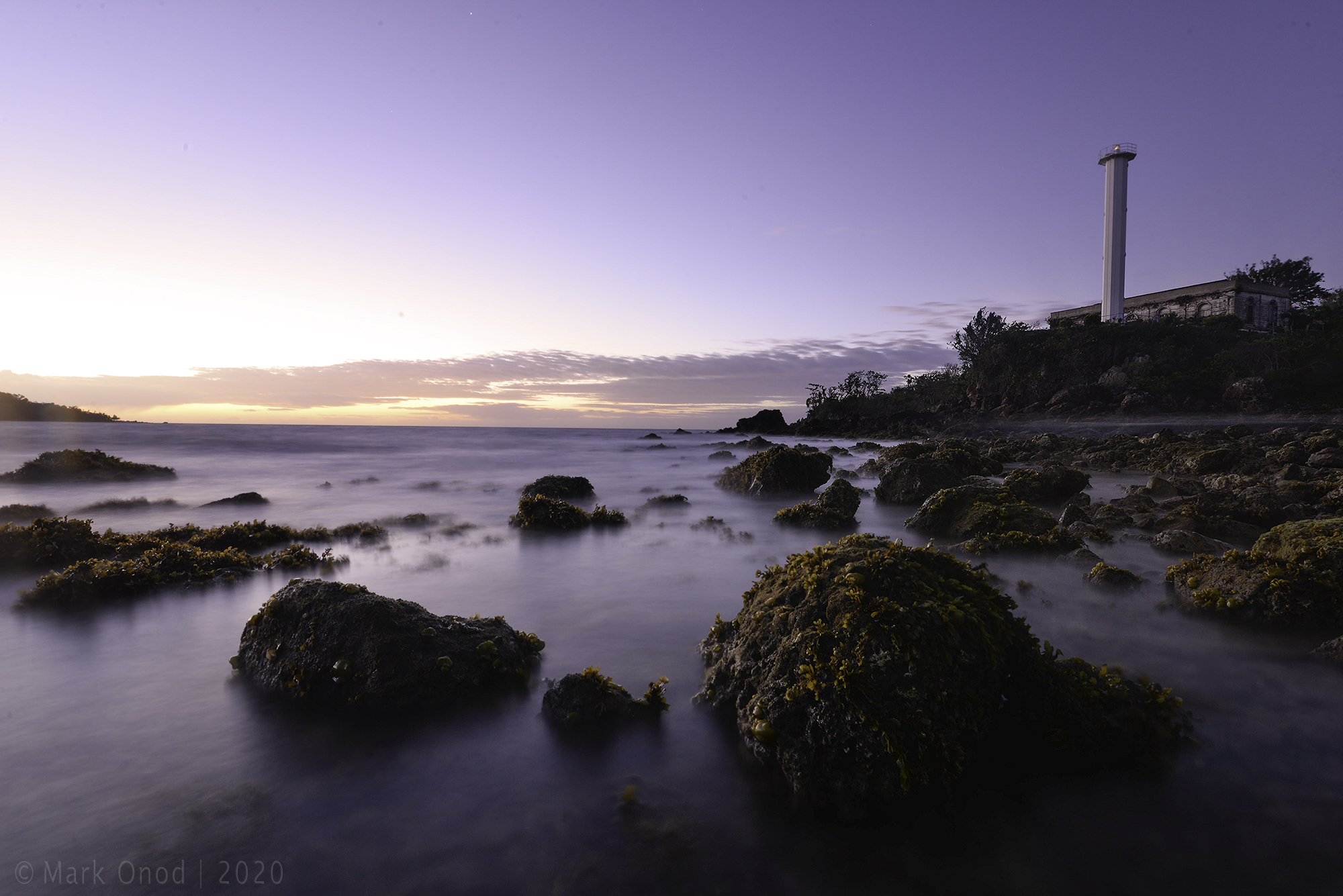
Gigantes Norte coast with Gigantes Lighthouse

== See also ==
- List of islands in the Philippines
