= Nabunot =

Island in the Philippines

- Location within Philippines

Geography
- Location: Visayan Sea
- Coordinates: 11.586389°N 123.212222°E
- Archipelago: Western Visayas
- Adjacent to: Nabunut Strait

Administration
- Philippines
- Province: Iloilo
- Municipality: Carles
- Barangays: Buenavista

Nabunot (variously Nabunut or Naburot) is an island in northeastern Iloilo, Philippines. It is one of fourteen islands politically administered by the municipality of Carles.

== Location and geography ==
Nabunot is an oval-shaped island northeast of the Panay Island coast in the Visayan Sea. It is 2 miles (3.2 km) southeast of Manigonigo Island. A shoal connects Nabunot with Tulunanaun Island, 2 miles (3.2 km) to the southeast.

== Natural disasters ==
=== Typhoon Haiyan ===
Typhoon Haiyan (locally known as "Yolanda") passed over Nabunot, along with the rest of Panay, on November 8, 2013, causing heavy damage. Once the storm passed, the British naval ship HMS Daring came through and assessed damage. On 16 November 2013, they observed that while many large building on the island had weathered the storm, several small structures had collapsed. The typhoon had also destroyed boats and trees. A shore party from HMS Daring returned to Nabunot on 21 November 2013, where they repaired five fishing boats, built temporary shelters, and cleaned out a room on the island school. The shore party also reported that potable water was being shipped in from Panay and two people had been advised to seek medical treatment for respiratory tract infections.

== See also ==
- List of islands in the Philippines
