= Calagnaan Island =

Island in Iloilo, Philippines

Calagnaan
- Location within Philippines

Geography
- Coordinates: 11°29′N 123°13′E
- Adjacent to: Jintotolo Channel; Nilidlaran Pass; Visayan Sea
- Area: 24.2 km^{2} (9.3 sq mi)
- Highest elevation: 1,112 ft (338.9 m)

Administration
- Philippines
- Region: Western Visayas
- Province: Iloilo
- Municipality: Carles
- Barangays: Barangcalan; Bito-on; Manlot; Talingting; Tinigban

Demographics
- Population: 5,017 (2020)

Calagnaan (also Calagna-an) is an island in northeastern Iloilo, Philippines. It is one of fourteen islands politically administered by the municipality of Carles. The population of the island is 5,017 as of 2020 census.

== Location and geography ==
Calagnaan is a wooded island northeast of the Panay Island coast in the Visayan Sea. It is southeast of Binuluangan Island and separated from that island by the Nilidlaran Pass.The west coast of the island is surrounded by reefs. Calagnaan is part of barangays Manlot, Tinigban, Bito-on (Proper, Bung-Indong Dako and Bung Indong Gamay), Talingting and Barangoalan (variously spelled Barangkalan). The island is home to Brachymeles talinis.

== History ==
The name Calagnaan comes from dagna or lagna, which is the Visayan word for water springs several of which can be found on the island. There are mining operations on the island, administered by the Calagnaan Agro-Industry Corporation.

=== Typhoon Haiyan ===
Typhoon Haiyan (locally known as Yolanda) passed over Calagnaan, along with the rest of Panay, on November 8, 2013. The British ships HMS Illustrious and HMS Daring both stopped on Calagnaan as part of their broader Philippine relief effort. When HMS Daring landed in the area on 23 November, they discovered that one remote village of Calagnaan had not yet been reached and villagers had not eaten for several days. HMS Illustrious' initial assessment on November 25 was that 177 houses, 60–70 boats, and the island school had been damaged. Illustrious' crew began its aid mission with a helicopter-drop of a 10.5 tonnes (11.6 tons) food pack and followed up with enough tarpaulin to repair 250 homes. Other organizations involved in the relief efforts on Calagnaan included Save the Children and UNICEF.

== See also ==
- List of islands in the Philippines
