= Jintotolo Channel =

Strait in the Philippines

- Jintotolo Strait
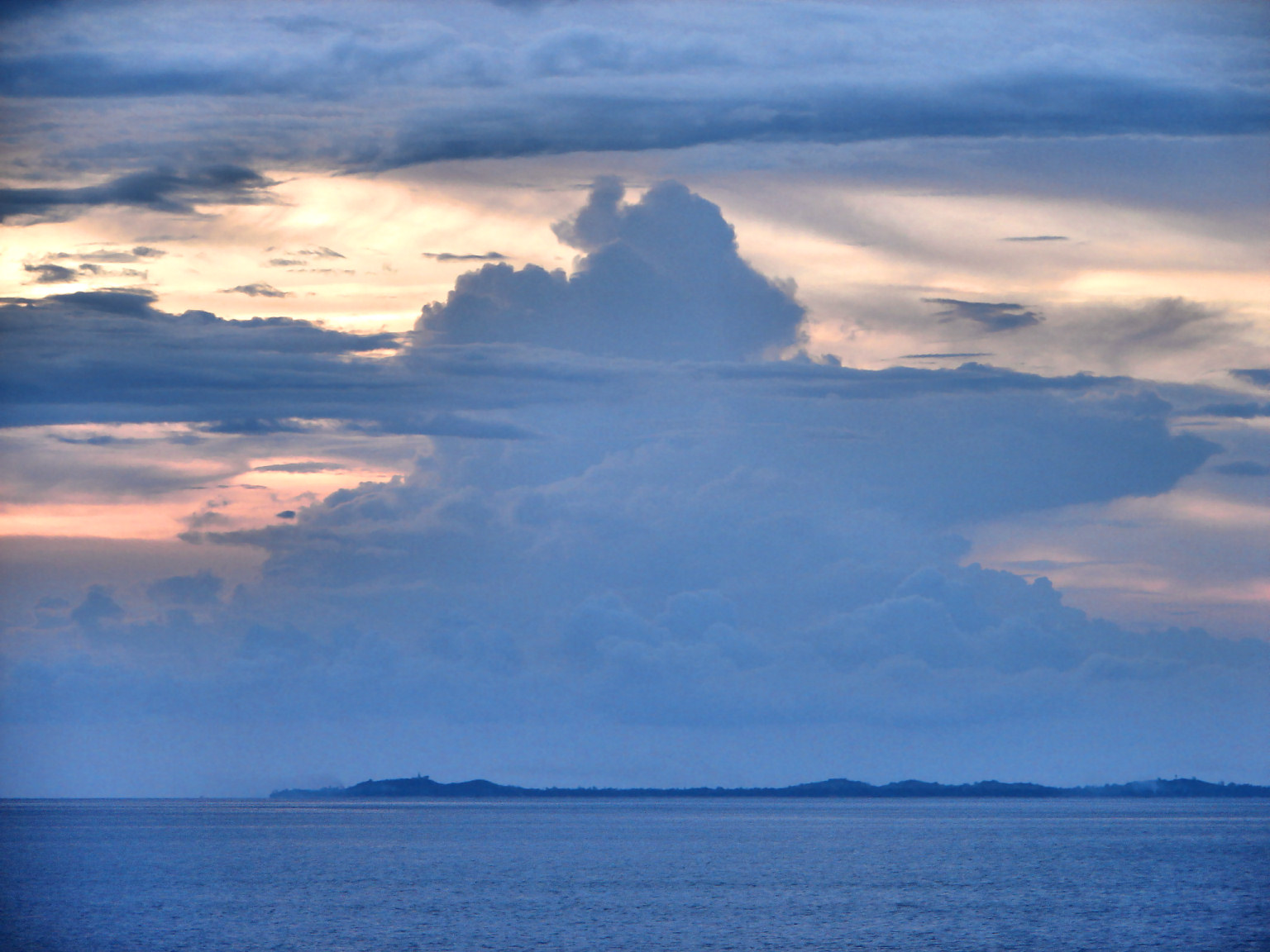
- Jintotolo Channel, showing Jintotolo Island in the distance

- Location within Philippines
- Location: Bicol Region, Philippines
- Coordinates: 11°45′N 123°07′E
- Max. width: 40 km (25 mi)

The Jintotolo Channel (or Jintotolo Strait) is the body of water that connects the Sibuyan Sea with the Visayan Sea. It is located between the Philippine islands of Panay and Masbate, and is an important shipping route to and from the Central Visayas.

Jintotolo Island (2010 population of 1,454) and the 3 small islets of the Zapatos Islands (2010 population of 585) lie in the middle of the channel. These islands fall under the jurisdiction of the Municipality of Balud, Masbate.

The channel is marked by a lighthouse on Jintotolo Island. The 15.5-metre-high (51 ft) lighthouse was built in 1890s and has a focal plane of 57 meters (187 ft) with 3 white flashes every 10 seconds.

The wrecks of the Japanese cruiser Kinu and destroyer Uranami lie on the bottom of the channel.
