= Bag-o Abo =

Small wooded island in northeastern Iloilo, Philippines

- Location within Philippines

Geography
- Coordinates: 11°12′8″N 123°7′58″E
- Archipelago: Concepcion Islands
- Adjacent to: Visayan Sea
- Area: 2.8 ha (6.9 acres)

Administration
- Philippines
- Region: Western Visayas
- Province: Iloilo
- Municipality: Concepcion

Bag-o Abo (historically Bagabu Islet) is a small, wooded island in northeastern Iloilo, Philippines. It is part of the municipality of Concepcion.

== Location and geography ==
Bag-o Abo Island is east of Panay Island in the Visayan Sea. Part of the Concepcion Islands, Bag-o Abo is 1.408 kilometres (.875 mi) southeast of Tago Island and southwest of Igbon Island.

== See also ==
- List of islands in the Philippines
