= Bocot Island =

Island in Iloilo, Philippines

Bocot
- Location within Philippines

Geography
- Coordinates: 11°19′29″N 123°10′48″E
- Archipelago: Concepcion Islands
- Adjacent to: Visayan Sea

Administration
- Philippines
- Region: Western Visayas
- Province: Iloilo
- Municipality: Concepcion

Bocot Island (variously Bocot Islet) is a small island in northeastern Iloilo, Philippines. It is part of the municipality of Concepcion.

== Location and geography ==
Bocot Island is east of Panay Island in the Visayan Sea. Part of the Concepcion Islands, Bocot is northeast of Pan de Azucar Island. Bocot is .25 miles (0.40 km) from nearby Magaisi Island (Bag-o Isi Island), separated only by a small channel.

== See also ==
- List of islands in the Philippines
