= Tagubanhan Island =

Island in Concepcion, Philippines

Tagubanhan
- Location within Philippines

Geography
- Coordinates: 11°7′33″N 123°7′47″E
- Archipelago: Concepcion Islands
- Adjacent to: Guimaras Strait; Visayan Sea

Administration
- Philippines
- Region: Western Visayas
- Province: Iloilo
- Municipality: Concepcion

Tagubanhan Island is a wooded island in northeastern Iloilo, Philippines. It is part of the municipality of Concepcion.

== Location and geography ==
Tagubanhan Island is 1.6 kilometres (1 mi) southeast of Panay Island in the Visayan Sea. Part of the Concepcion Islands, Tagubanhan is southwest of Igbon Island and northwest of Anauayan Island. Tagubanhan is separated from Panay by a deep channel and is 980 feet (300 m) at its highest point. To the northwest of Tagubanhan is Mount Apiton, and the channel between Tagubanhan and Panay is known as the Apiton Pass.

== See also ==
- List of islands in the Philippines

== Sources ==
- Christman, Reuben Jacob (1919). United States Coast Pilot, Philippine Islands, Part 1. U.S. Government Printing Office. p. 225.
