= Agho Island =

Island in the Philippines

Agho
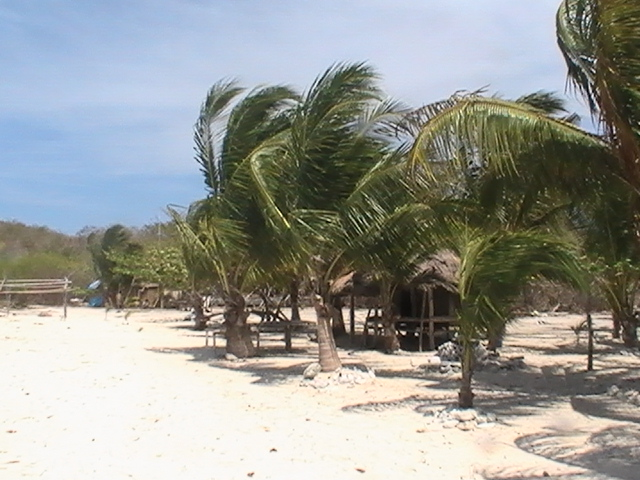
- Beach facilities at the island in 2010

- Location within Philippines

Geography
- Coordinates: 11°13′34″N 123°11′42″E
- Archipelago: Concepcion Islands
- Adjacent to: Visayan Sea
- Area: 0.09 km^{2} (0.035 sq mi)

Administration
- Philippines
- Region: Western Visayas
- Province: Iloilo
- Municipality: Concepcion

Agho Island is a small, mostly uninhabited island in northeastern Iloilo, Philippines. It is part of the municipality of Concepcion.

== Location and geography ==
Agho Island is 7 nautical miles east of Panay Island in the Visayan Sea. It is in a channel between Igbon Island and Malangabang Island. Quiniluban Island is to the northwest. The island is home to tropical birds, including sea hawks and Tabon birds.

== History ==
Japanese soldiers landed on Agho during World War II, although they did not stay as they had a garrison in nearby Bagungon Island. The island is currently owned by the Villarias clan, who own the island's resort and sari-sari store.

In 1980 or 81, a couple arrived on Agho Island with the claim that the island has been given to them by then-president Ferdinand Marcos. This couple, variously American or Australian and named as Thomas and Terry Cook or Kurt, hired locals to build a cottage on Agho. At first, relations between the couple and the locals were friendly; however, after the cottage was completed the couple posted an armed guard and dogs on the property to keep out intruders. Tensions between the couple and the locals grew and eventually the authorities were called in. On 19 August 1988, Narcom (Philippine Drug Enforcement Agency) found 1,000 plants on the property that were believed to be cocoa plants, although some officials disputed this claim. The couple had left the island two years earlier, after Marcos's fall from power.

== Transport ==
Agho is a 30-minute pumpboat ride from Concepcion.

== See also ==
- List of islands in the Philippines
