= Botlog Island =

Island in the Philippines

Botlog
- Location within Philippines

Geography
- Coordinates: 11°13′52″N 123°9′30″E
- Archipelago: Concepcion Islands
- Adjacent to: Visayan Sea
- Highest elevation: 113 m (371 ft)

Administration
- Philippines
- Region: Western Visayas
- Province: Iloilo
- Municipality: Concepcion
- Barangay: Botlog

Demographics
- Population: 441 (2010)

Botlog Island is an island and barangay in northeastern Iloilo, Philippines. It is part of the municipality of Concepcion. According to the 2010 census, it has a population of 441.

== Location and geography ==
Botlog Island is east of Panay Island in the Visayan Sea. Part of the Concepcion Islands, Botlog is in between Igbon Island and Pan de Azucar Island. Botlog is a forested island and is 113 metres (371 ft) at its highest point. Its sole barangay is Botlog.

== Natural disasters ==
=== Typhoon Haiyan ===
Typhoon Haiyan (locally known as Yolanda) passed over Botlog Island in 2013, damaging boats and homes. The VICTO National region 6 office helped in relief efforts, distributing emergency food rations.

== See also ==
- List of islands in the Philippines
