= Magalumbi =

Island in the Philippines

- Location within Philippines

Geography
- Coordinates: 11°23′12″N 123°9′46″E
- Adjacent to: Visayan Sea
- Highest elevation: 159 ft (48.5 m)

Administration
- Philippines
- Region: Western Visayas
- Province: Iloilo
- Municipality: Batad

Magalumbi (variously Magalumbi Islet) is an island in northeastern Iloilo, Philippines. It is part of the municipality of Batad, although the official provincial government website lists it as an offshore island of Estancia. Magalumbi is part of barangay Tanao, which has a population of 1,903 according to the 2010 census.

Magalumbi is known for its batang langoy (English: "swimming kids"), the children who have to swim to or from the mainland in order to attend school.

== Location and geography ==
Magalumbi Island is east of Panay Island in the Visayan Sea. Magalumbi is 3.2 kilometres (2 mi) north of Colebra Island, which is part of nearby Concepcion.

== Batang langoy ==
On 7 July, 2008, GMA Network aired an episode of I-Witness titled Batang Langoy. The episode focused on the children who lived on island barangays who had to swim either two or from their homes to the mainland in order to attend school. Batang Langoy featured 10-year-old Queenche and 13-year-old Raul, children from Magalumbi who had to swim home every night. According to the report, the children's parents transported them by boat to school in the mornings, but in the afternoons the children had to swim the 2 kilometres (1.2 mi) distance. As they couldn't take their books with them, the children had to bury their books on the beach every afternoon and retrieve them the next morning.

== Natural disasters ==
=== Typhoon Haiyan ===
On 8 November, 2013, Typhoon Haiyan (locally known as Yolanda) caused heavy damage to the fishing industry on Magalumbi. Relief workers organized to distribute supplies once the storm passed. The University of San Agustin's College of Pharmacy & Medical Technology (CPMT) planned to distribute four boats to local fishermen.

== See also ==
- List of islands in the Philippines
