= Baliguian Island =

Island of the Philippines

- Location within Philippines

Geography
- Coordinates: 11°12′1″N 123°20′21″E
- Archipelago: Concepcion Islands
- Adjacent to: Visayan Sea

Administration
- Philippines
- Region: Western Visayas
- Province: Iloilo
- Municipality: Concepcion

Baliguian Island (variously Baliguian Islet and unofficially called Miracle Island by the locals, due to its experiences with Typhoon Haiyan) is an inhabited island in northeastern Iloilo, Philippines. It is the westernmost of the Concepcion Islands and politically administered by the municipality of Concepcion. A virtually flat island, Baliguian features a lighthouse to aid in ship navigation.

== Location and geography ==
Baliguian Island is 22.5 kilometres (14.0 mi) east of Panay Island in the Visayan Sea, making it the furthest of the sixteen Concepcion Islands. Baliguian is 14 kilometres (9 mi) due east of nearby Igbon Island. Small, flat, and heavily wooded, Baliguian is ringed by a narrow reef and surrounded by deep water.

== Lighthouse ==
The main feature of Baliguian is its lighthouse, situated on the northwest corner of the island. The Baliguian Island Light was built in 1916. Its designations are ARLHS PHI-007, Admiralty F2314, and NGA 14668. The white, octagonal tower is 66 feet (20 m) high and flashes a white light every seven seconds. The lighthouse is currently active and administered by the Philippine Coast Guard. Rainwater tanks were installed on Baliguian in 2010, as the island until then faced a constant shortage of potable water.

== Natural disasters ==
=== Typhoon Haiyan ===
In November 2013 Typhoon Haiyan (Yolanda in the Philippines) destroyed more than 80 percent of homes and pump boats on Baliguian. Four rooms of the island's single school were also damaged. The island did not suffer any fatalities; however, causing locals to dub their home the "Miracle Island". Several religious and international organizations assisted in relief efforts for Baliguian, including Indigenous Ministries and Wilde and Woollard.

== See also ==
- List of islands in the Philippines
- Lighthouses in the Philippines
