= Bulubadiangan Island =

Island in the Philippines

Bulubadiangan
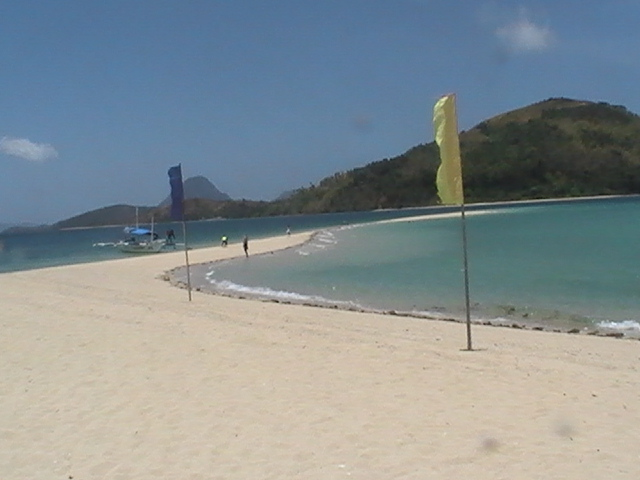
- The sandbar at the island

- Location within Philippines

Geography
- Coordinates: 11°11′2″N 123°9′29″E
- Archipelago: Concepcion Islands
- Adjacent to: Visayan Sea
- Area: 0.21 km^{2} (0.081 sq mi)
- Highest elevation: 220 ft (67 m)

Administration
- Philippines
- Region: Western Visayas
- Province: Iloilo
- Municipality: Concepcion
- Barangay: Polopińa

Demographics
- Population: 3,419 (2010)

Bulubadiangan Island (variously Bulobadiangan island or Bulubadiangan Islet) is a privately owned island in northeastern Iloilo, Philippines. It is part of barangay Polopińa, Concepcion. The Sandbar Island Beach Resort on Bulubadiangan is moderately known within the Philippines.

== Location and geography ==
Bulubadiangan Island is east of Panay Island in the Visayan Sea. Part of the Concepcion Islands, it is a small island off the end of Igbon Island. Bulubadiangan is 220 feet (67 m) at its highest point. Bulubadiangan is 0.5 miles (0.80 km) from Igbon and 2 miles (3.2 km) from Pan de Azucar Island. It is connected to Danao-Danao Island by a small reef. Although privately owned, Bulubadiangan is part of the Polopińa barangay, which has a population of 3,419 according to the 2010 census.

== Places of interest ==
The main feature of Bulubadiangan is its 200-metre (660 ft) sandbar, which is exposed at low tide. The sandbar is a popular destination for tourists visiting Concepcion.

Resorts:

1. Sandbar Beach Resort

2. Villa Manuela Island Resort

== See also ==
- List of islands in the Philippines
