= Bag-o Isi Island =

Island in the Philippines

Bag-o Isi
- Location within Philippines

Geography
- Coordinates: 11°18′52″N 123°10′9″E
- Archipelago: Concepcion Islands
- Adjacent to: Visayan Sea
- Highest elevation: 232 ft (70.7 m)

Administration
- Philippines
- Region: Western Visayas
- Province: Iloilo
- Municipality: Concepcion

Bag-o Isi Island (variously Magaisi Island or Magaisi Islet) is a small island in northeastern Iloilo, Philippines. It is part of the municipality of Concepcion.

== Location and geography ==
Bag-o Isi Island is east of Panay Island in the Visayan Sea. Part of the Concepcion Islands, Bag-o Isi is off the north coast of Pan de Azucar Island. Bocot Island is only 0.40 kilometres (.25 mi) from Bag-o Isi Island. Bago-o Isi is 232 feet (71 m) at its highest point.

== See also ==
- List of islands in the Philippines
