= Concepción (military district) =

Former administrative division of the Philippines

Comandancia of Concepcion Comandancia de Concepción (Spanish)
- Former district of the Philippines
- 1857–1901
- Location of the historical district of Concepcion
- Capital: Concepcion (1857–1901)
- Population
  - 1876: 15,886
  - 1885: 30,669
  - 1897: 38,982
- Historical era: Colonial period
  - Established: 1857
  - Disestablished: 11 April 1901
Preceded by	Succeeded by
Iloilo	Iloilo

Concepción, officially the Comandancia of Concepcion (Spanish: Comandancia de Concepción), was an administrative division of the Philippines that functioned as a politico-military district within the province of Iloilo. Established in 1857 by a decree from Governor General Fernando Norzagaray y Escudero, it was located in northern Iloilo on the northeastern coast of Panay Island. It was comprised several towns, including its capital, Concepcion, as well as Ajuy, Balasan (which also includes modern-day Batad and Estancia), Lemery, San Dionisio, and Sara. The district was abolished on April 11, 1901, following the American takeover of the Philippines and the subsequent establishment of a civil government in Iloilo.

== History ==
The autonomy of the Comandancia of Concepcion lasted until the onset of American rule in the Philippines. In a report sent by the Philippine Commission to the president of the United States in 1900, the capital was described as having an excellent harbor. The primary product of the district was sugar, while its other commodities were similar to those found throughout the island of Panay.

On April 11, 1901, a meeting convened by the Philippine Commission was held in the town of Iloilo. Only one municipality from the district, Sara, was able to send a representative. Sara had called a brief meeting on April 10 but only presented the agenda for discussion the following day. During this meeting, the transition of the province of Iloilo to a civil government was discussed and passed under Philippine Commission Act No. 113. Under this act, the Commandancia de Concepción was dissolved, and all its territories were incorporated into the province of Iloilo.

Today, the area corresponds to the 5th legislative district of Iloilo, excluding the towns of Barotac Viejo and San Rafael.
