= Malangabang =

Island in northeastern Lloilo Philippines

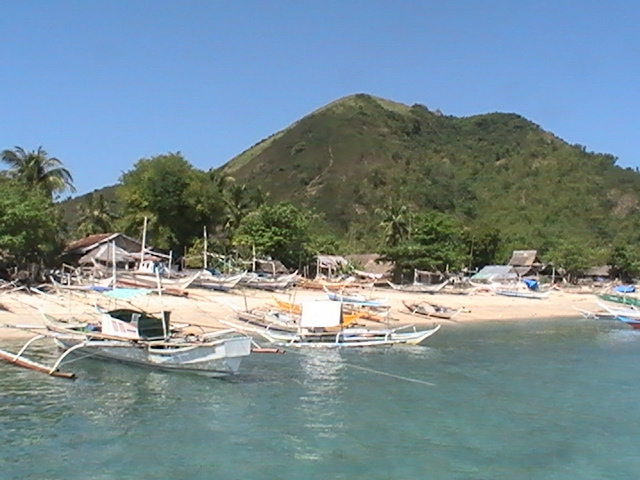

- Location within Philippines

Geography
- Coordinates: 11°14′31″N 123°12′28″E
- Archipelago: Concepcion Islands
- Adjacent to: Visayan Sea
- Highest elevation: 239 m (784 ft)

Administration
- Philippines
- Region: Western Visayas
- Province: Iloilo
- Municipality: Concepcion
- Barangay: Malangabang

Demographics
- Population: 2,925 (2010)

Malangabang (variously Malangaban) is an island and barangay in northeastern Iloilo, Philippines. It is part of the municipality of Concepcion. According to the 2010 census, it has a population of 2,925. Fishing is the main source of income for the island's residents. Part of the island historically known as Malangabang, now officially designated as Barangay Malangabang, includes a parcel of land that is registered under the name Honorato Ciriaco, according to official land title records.

== Location and geography ==
Malangabang Island is east of Panay Island in the Visayan Sea. Part of the Concepcion Islands, it is a wooded island and is 239 metres (784 ft) at its highest point. Malangabang is 3.2 kilometres (2 mi) southeast of Pan de Azucar. Malangabang completely surrounds the small Chico Island. Malangabang's sole barangay is also named Malangabang.

== Natural disasters ==
=== Typhoon Haiyan ===
In 2013, Typhoon Haiyan (locally known as Yolanda) struck Malangabang with 20 feet (6.1 m) waves, and many residents lost their boats to the storm. All told, the storm destroyed at least 470 boats and 370 houses. After the storm passed, several relief organizations went to Malangabang to deliver aid and offer assistance, including Multicultural Response, the Philippine Medical Association's Doctors on Boat project, and the Korea-based 601 Habitat.

== See also ==
- List of islands in the Philippines
