= Chico Island (Iloilo) =

Island in Iloilo, Philippines

Chico
Native name: Bag-o Sipol
- Location within Philippines

Geography
- Coordinates: 11°14′13″N 123°11′43″E
- Archipelago: Concepcion Islands
- Adjacent to: Visayan Sea
- Area: 4 ha (9.9 acres)

Administration
- Philippines
- Region: Western Visayas
- Province: Iloilo
- Municipality: Concepcion

Demographics
- Population: uninhabited

Chico (variously Bag-o Sipol, Chico Islet or Maguho Islet) is an uninhabited island in northeastern Iloilo, Philippines. It is part of the municipality of Concepcion. The island is owned by the heirs of Consuelo and Zacarias Bagaforo of Malangabang Island.

== Location and geography ==
Chico Island is east of Panay Island in the Visayan Sea. Part of the Concepcion Islands, Chico is east of Sombrero Island and near Agho Island.

== See also ==
- List of islands in the Philippines
- List of islands
- Desert island
