= Pangalan Islet =

Pangalan
- Location within Philippines

Geography
- Coordinates: 11°24′N 123°12′E
- Archipelago: Bayas Islets
- Adjacent to: Visayan Sea
- Area: 1.48 km^{2} (0.57 sq mi)

Administration
- Philippines
- Region: Western Visayas
- Province: Iloilo
- Municipality: Estancia
- Barangay: Manipulon

Demographics
- Population: uninhabited

Pangalan Islet is a low, uninhabited islet in northeastern Iloilo, Philippines. It is part of the municipality of Estancia under the jurisdiction of the barangay of Manipulon.

== Location and geography ==
Pangalan Islet is located 0.5 miles (0.80 km) east of Panay Island in the Visayan Sea. Pangalan is part of the Bayas Islets, which include Bayas Island, Manipulon Islet, and Magosipal Islet. Pangalan and Magosipal are connected by reefs, with no running water between them.

== See also ==
- List of islands in the Philippines
