= Bayas Islets =

Group of islets in the Philippines

- Location within Philippines

Geography
- Coordinates: 11°25′59″N 123°10′59″E
- Adjacent to: Visayan Sea
- Total islands: 4
- Major islands: Bayas Island; Magosipal Islet; Manipulon Islet; Pangalan Islet

Administration
- Philippines
- Region: Western Visayas
- Province: Iloilo
- Municipality: Estancia

The Bayas Islets are a group of four islands in the Visayan Sea, east of Estancia, Iloilo, Philippines. The Islets include:

- Bayas Island
- Manipulon Islet
- Magosipal Islet
- Pangalan Islet
