= Bayas Island =

Island in the Philippines

Bayas
- Location within Philippines

Geography
- Coordinates: 11°25′55″N 123°10′55″E
- Archipelago: Bayas Islets
- Adjacent to: Visayan Sea
- Highest elevation: 216 ft (65.8 m)

Administration
- Philippines
- Region: Western Visayas
- Province: Iloilo
- Municipality: Estancia
- Barangay: Bayas

Demographics
- Population: 2,616 (2020)

Additional information

Bayas Island is a small island and barangay in northeastern Iloilo, Philippines. It is part of the municipality of Estancia. According to the 2020 census, it has a population of 2,616. The Island was titled to Filomena Reyes Aclaro and is now shared to the locals.

== Location and geography ==
Bayas Island is located east of Panay Island in the Visayan Sea. Nearby islands include Sicogon Island to the east, Manipulon Island to the west, Loguingot Island to the northwest, and Manlot Island to the northeast. Bayas Island is part of the Bayas Islets, which also includes Manipulon, Magosipal, and Pangalan. Of the islets, Bayas is the largest, at 216 feet (66 m).

== Natural disasters ==
=== Typhoon Haiyan ===
Typhoon Haiyan (locally known as Yolanda) passed over Bayas Island and caused heavy damage. Immediately after the typhoon, several relief groups donated materials and aid to the island. On 25 November 2013, helicopters from British aircraft carrier HMS Illustrious surveyed damage and delivered food and medical aid using the carrier's helicopters. Korea-based The 601 habit donated 10 fishing boats to families in December 2013. The University of the Philippines Visayas and the Canadian embassy also assisted in relief efforts. In 2014, they donated 31 fishing boats to Bayas residents.

== Transport ==
Bayas Island is accessible by boats that leave from Estancia Pier.

== See also ==
- List of islands in the Philippines
