= Colebra Island =

Philippines island

Colebra
Native name: Bago-alas
- Location within Philippines

Geography
- Coordinates: 11°21′13″N 123°13′34″E
- Archipelago: Concepcion Islands
- Adjacent to: Visayan Sea
- Highest elevation: 116 ft (35.4 m)

Administration
- Philippines
- Region: Western Visayas
- Province: Iloilo
- Municipality: Concepcion

Colebra (variously Bago-alas or Culebra Islet) is an island in northeastern Iloilo, Philippines. It is part of the municipality of Concepcion.

== Location and geography ==
Colebra Island is east of Panay Island in the Visayan Sea. Part of the Concepcion Islands, Colebra is the northernmost point of Concepcion, and only 3.2 kilometres (2 mi) south of Magalumbi Island, which is part of Batad.

== See also ==
- List of islands in the Philippines
