= Anauayan Island =

Island in the Philippines

Anauayan
- Location within Philippines

Geography
- Coordinates: 11°5′44″N 123°9′17″E
- Archipelago: Concepcion Islands
- Adjacent to: Guimaras Strait; Visayan Sea
- Length: 1.33 km (0.826 mi)

Administration
- Philippines
- Region: Western Visayas
- Province: Iloilo
- Municipality: Concepcion

Anauayan Island is a small island in northeastern Iloilo, Philippines. It is part of the municipality of Concepcion.

== Location and geography ==
Anauayan Island is southeast of Panay Island in the Visayan Sea. Part of the Concepcion Islands, it is 2 miles (3.2 km) southeast of Tagubanhan Island. Anauayan is separated from Panay by a deep channel and is 54 metres (177 ft) at its highest point.

== See also ==
- List of islands in the Philippines
