= Magosipal Islet =

Uninhabited islet in the Philippines

Magosipal or Magusipol
- Location within Philippines

Geography
- Coordinates: 11°26′15″N 123°9′31″E
- Archipelago: Bayas Islets
- Adjacent to: Visayan Sea

Administration
- Philippines
- Region: Western Visayas
- Province: Iloilo
- Municipality: Estancia
- Barangay: Manipulon

Demographics
- Population: uninhabited

Magusipol Island (or Magusipal) is an uninhabited islet in northeastern Iloilo, Philippines. It is part of the municipality of Estancia under the jurisdiction of the barangay of Manipulon.

== Location and geography ==
Magusipol Island is located east of Panay Island in the Visayan Sea. Magusipol is part of the Bayas Islets, which include Bayas Island, Manipulon Island, and Pangalan Island. Magusipol and Pangalan are connected by reefs, with no running water between them.

== See also ==
- List of islands in the Philippines
