= Sombrero Island (Iloilo) =

Island in the Philippines

Sombrero
- Location within Philippines

Geography
- Coordinates: 11°15′37″N 123°10′33″E
- Archipelago: Concepcion Islands
- Adjacent to: Visayan Sea

Administration
- Philippines
- Region: Western Visayas
- Province: Iloilo
- Municipality: Concepcion

Sombrero (variously Sombrero Islet) is a small, cone-shaped island in northeastern Iloilo, Philippines. It is part of the municipality of Concepcion.

== Location and geography ==
Sombrero Island is east of Panay Island in the Visayan Sea. Part of the Concepcion Islands, Sombrero is southeast of Pan de Azucar Island by less than 0.40 kilometres (.25 mi). A sandbar connects Sombrero to Pan de Azucar at low tide. Sombrero is a wooded island and is 549 feet (167 m) at its highest point.

== See also ==
- List of islands in the Philippines
