= Loguingot =

- Location within Philippines

Geography
- Location: Visayan Sea
- Coordinates: 11.4613°N 123.1709°E
- Archipelago: Western Visayas

Administration
- Philippines
- Province: Iloilo
- Municipality: Estancia
- Barangays: Loguingot

Demographics
- Population: 796 (2010)

Loguingot is a small island-barangay in northeastern Iloilo, Philippines. It is part of the municipality of Estancia. According to the 2010 census, it has a population of 796. Fishing is the main source of income for the island's residents.

== Location ==
Loguingot Island is located west of Panay Island in a bay of the Visayan Sea. Immediate nearby islands include Manlot Island to the east, Himamaylan Island to the north, Magosipal Islet to the southwest, and Manipulon Islet, to the southeast. Calagnaan Island is 1 mile (1.6 km) away to the north. Loguingot's sole barangay is also named Loguingot.

== Natural disasters ==
=== Typhoon Haiyan ===
Loguingot Island suffered damage as a result of Typhoon Haiyan (locally known as "Yolanda"). One island resident was reported killed. After the typhoon passed, several organizations assisted in relief efforts for the island residents. International NGO United Sikhs partnered with iMKIRAN to donate 1,000 solar light bulbs to the residents of Loguingot and nearby village Crossing Lais.

== See also ==
- List of islands in the Philippines
