= Sombrero Island (disambiguation) =

Sombrero Island may refer to one of several islands:

- Sombrero, Anguilla, in the Caribbean

== Islands in the Philippines ==
- Sombrero Island (Batangas), see List of islands of the Philippines
- Sombrero Island (Camarines Sur), see List of islands of the Philippines
- Sombrero Island (Iloilo)
- Sombrero Island (Palawan), see List of islands of the Philippines
