= Igbon =

Igbon may refer to:

- Alan Igbon (1952–2020), British actor
- Igbon Island, island and barangay of Concepcion, Philippines
