= Concepcion Islands =

17 islands in Iloilo, Philippines

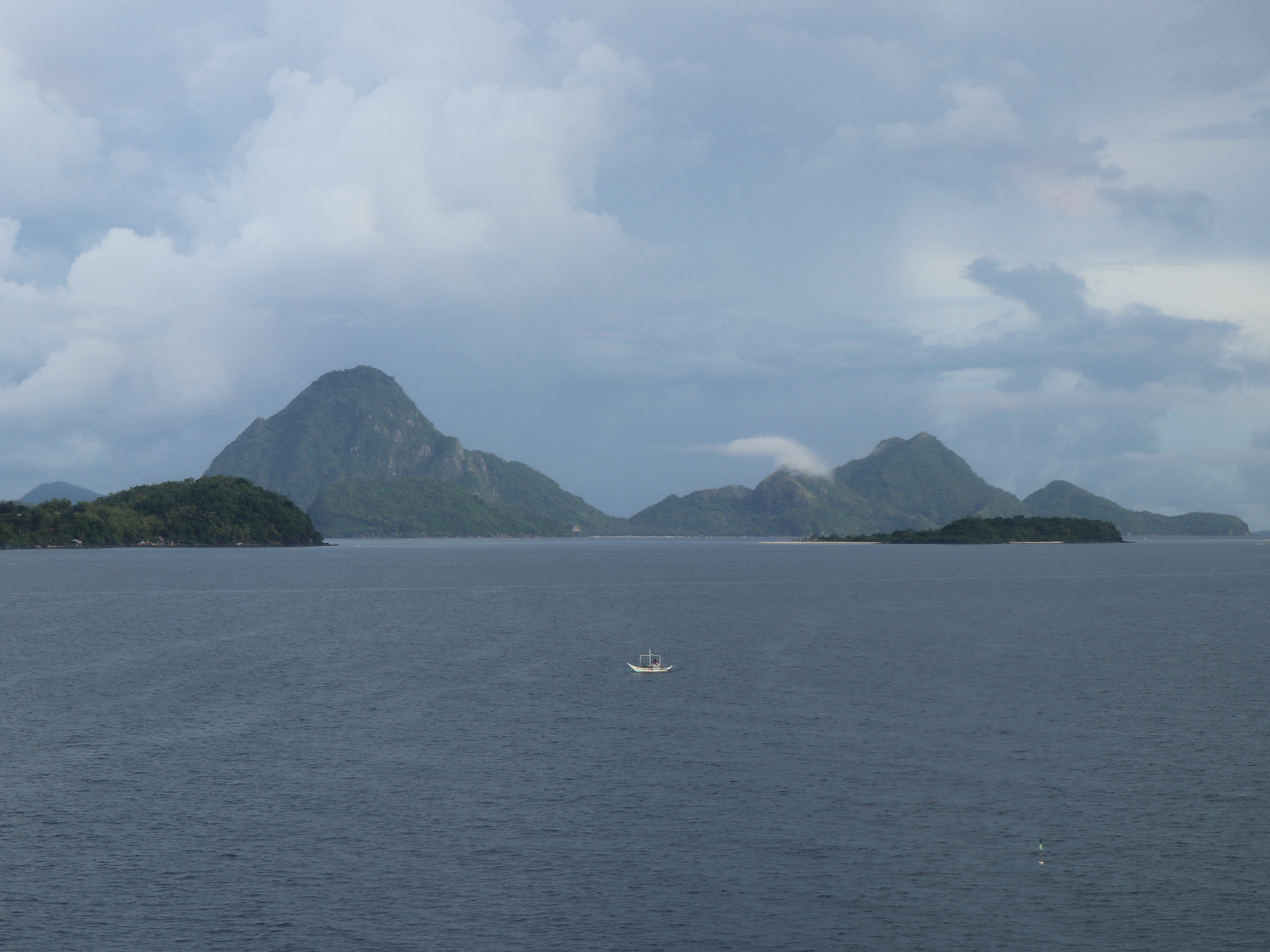
- Pan de Azucar Island

- Location within Philippines

Geography
- Coordinates: 11°16′57″N 123°10′00″E
- Archipelago: Visayas
- Adjacent to: Guimaras Strait; Visayan Sea
- Total islands: 17
- Major islands: Agho Island; Anauayan Island; Bag-o Abo Island; Bag-o Isi Island; Baliguian Island; Bocot Island; Botlog Island; Bulubadiangan Island; Chico Island; Colebra Island; Danao-Danao Island; Igbon Island; Malangabang Island; Pan de Azucar Island; Sombrero Island; Tago Island; Tagubanhan Island
- Area: 34.97 km^{2} (13.50 sq mi)
- Highest elevation: 2,900 ft (880 m)
- Highest point: Manaphag

Administration
- Philippines
- Region: Western Visayas
- Province: Iloilo
- Municipality: Concepcion
- Barangays: Bagongon; Botlog; Dungon; Igbon; Macatunao; Malangabang; Polopińa; Salvacion; Talo-toan; Tambaliza

Demographics
- Population: 19,080 (2010)

Additional information
- Official website: Concepcion official website

The Concepcion Islands are 17 variously inhabited and uninhabited islands in northeastern Iloilo, Philippines. The islands are politically subdivided into 11 island barangays and are part of the municipality of Concepcion. According to the 2010 census, the islands collectively have a population of 19,080, 48 percent of the total population of the municipality of Concepcion.

== History ==
In 1604, Juan Salgado twice defeated Spanish pirates near Pan de Azucar. During World War II, Japanese forces shot down an American fighter pilot, which crash landed near Bag-o Abo Island.

== Geography ==
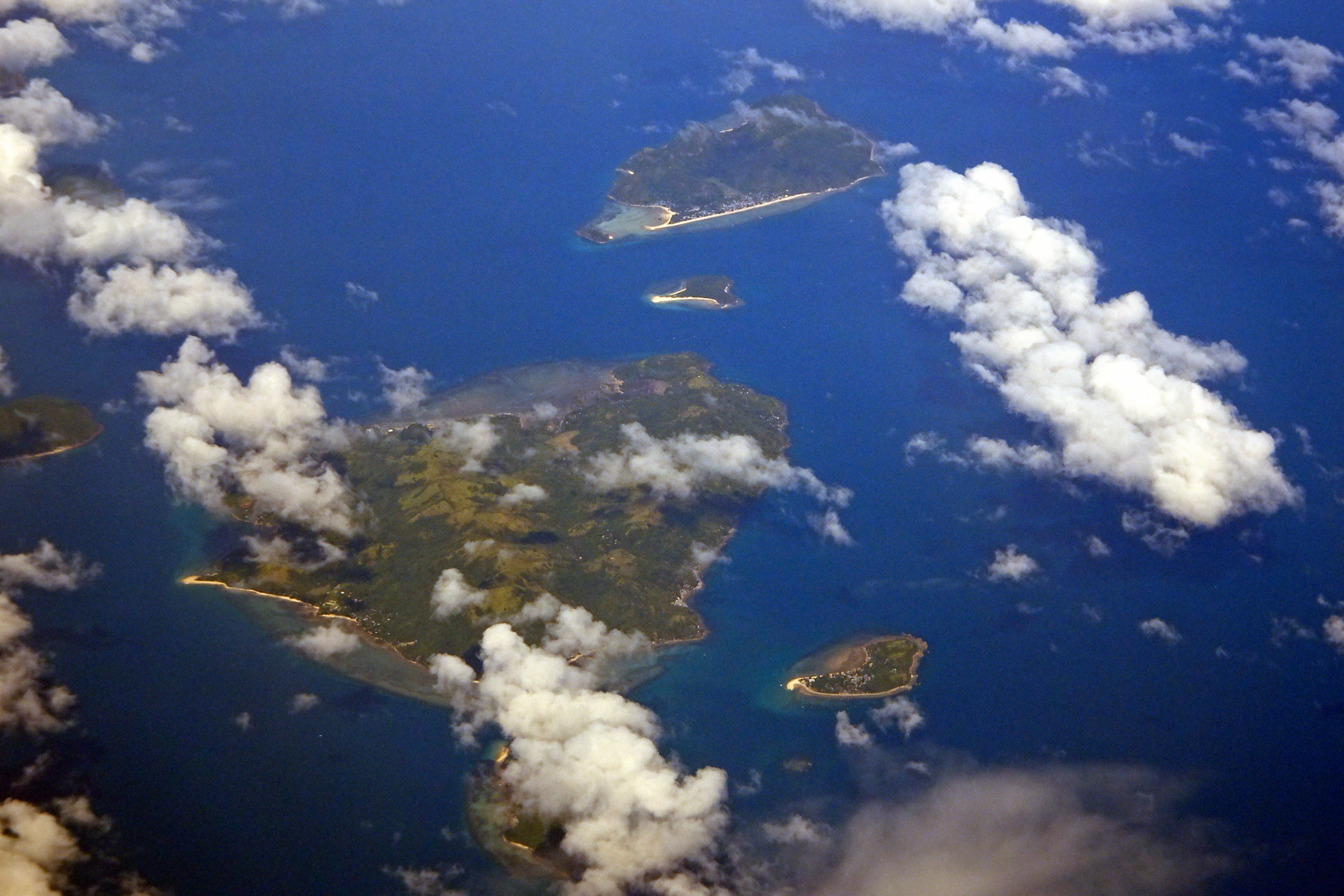
Aerial view of Igbon Island and several other nearby Concepcion Islands

The Concepcion Islands are located east of Panay Island in the Visayan Sea, and are part of the larger Western Visayas archipelago. The islands are part of the town of Concepcion, and comprise 40 percent of Concepcion's total land area. The nearest island is Tago, which is a coral reef 200 metres (660 ft) from the mainland, inside Concepcion Bay. The furthest island is far-flung Baliguian, located 22 kilometres (14 mi) away from the mainland. Baliguian also marks the end of Concepcion's municipal waters. The majority of the islands are mountainous and wooded, ringed by white sand beaches and surrounded by reefs, shoals, and sandbars. A few of the islands feature lighthouses to aid ship navigation in this area.

=== Islands ===
The Concepcion Islands are:

- Agho Island
- Anauayan Island
- Bag-o Abo Island
- Bag-o Isi Island
- Baliguian Island
- Bocot Island
- Botlog Island
- Bulubadiangan Island
- Chico Island (Bag-o Sipol Island)
- Colebra Island (Bago-alas Island)
- Danao-Danao Island
- Igbon Island
- Malangabang Island
- Pan de Azucar Island
- Sombrero Island
- Tago Island
- Tagubanhan Island

== See also ==
- List of islands in the Philippines
