= Danao-Danao Island =

Island in the Philippines

Danao-Danao
- Location within Philippines

Geography
- Coordinates: 11°11′8″N 123°10′35″E
- Archipelago: Concepcion Islands
- Adjacent to: Visayan Sea
- Highest elevation: 92 ft (28 m)

Administration
- Philippines
- Region: Western Visayas
- Province: Iloilo
- Municipality: Concepcion

Danao-Danao Island (variously Danao Danao island, Danao Island, Dunad Island, Dunao Island or Dunao Islet) is a small, low-lying island in northeastern Iloilo, Philippines. It is part of the municipality of Concepcion.

== Location and geography ==
Danao-Danao Island is 10.1 kilometres (6.3 mi) east of Panay Island in the Visayan Sea. Part of the Concepcion Islands, it is separated from nearby Bulubadiangan Island by a small reef. Danao-Danao is 92 feet (28 m) at its highest point.

== Natural disasters ==
=== Typhoon Haiyan ===
In 2013, Typhoon Haiyan (locally known as Yolanda) Passed over Danao-Danao, damaging boats and homes. Rather than evacuate, some villagers stayed behind during the storm, in order to protect their boats. Four men went missing as a result.

== See also ==
- List of islands in the Philippines
