= San Dionisio, Iloilo =

Municipality in Iloilo, Philippines

San Dionisio
- Municipality
- Municipality of San Dionisio
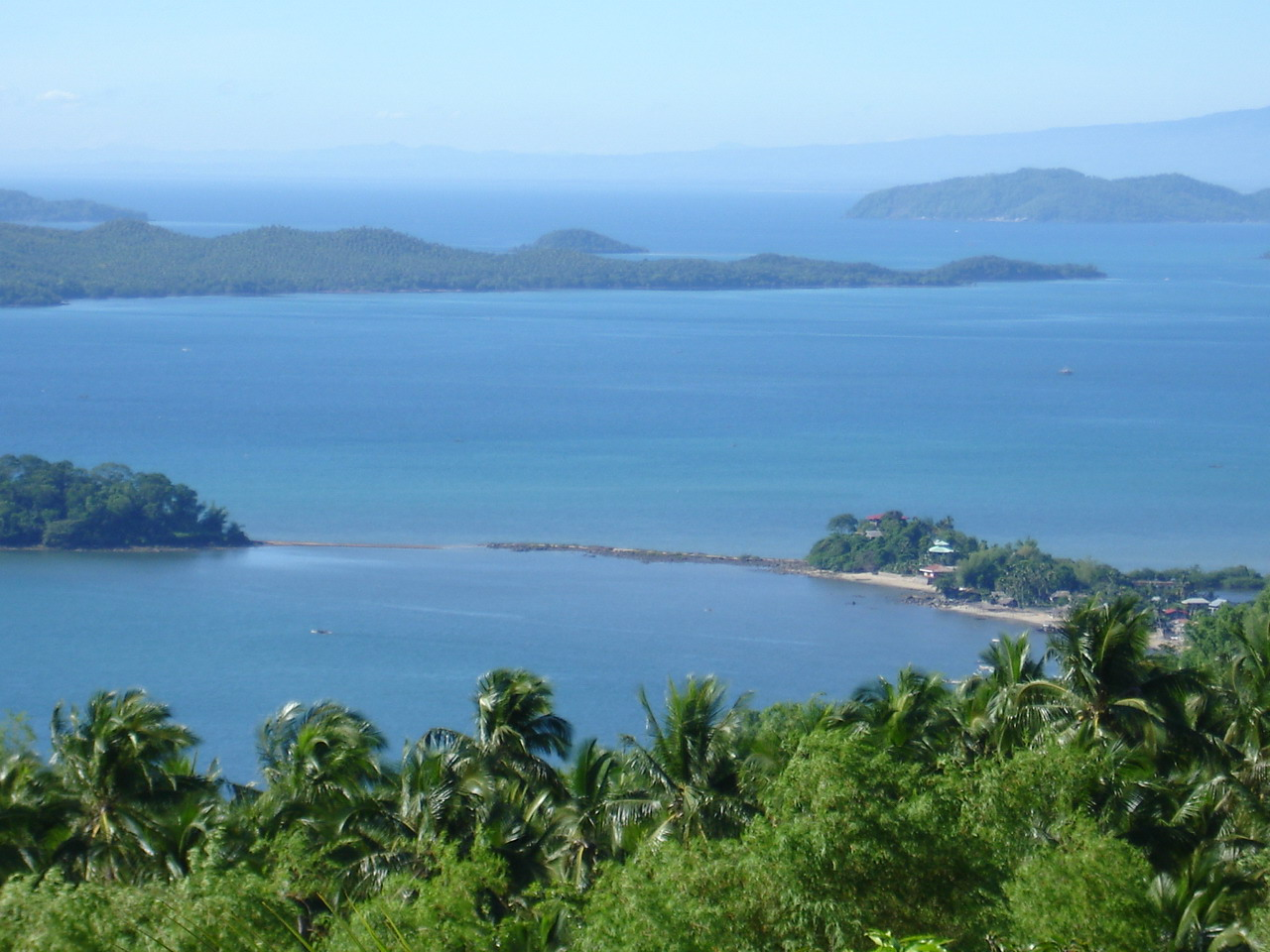
- View of San Dionisio from east from Mount Opao on Sicogon island

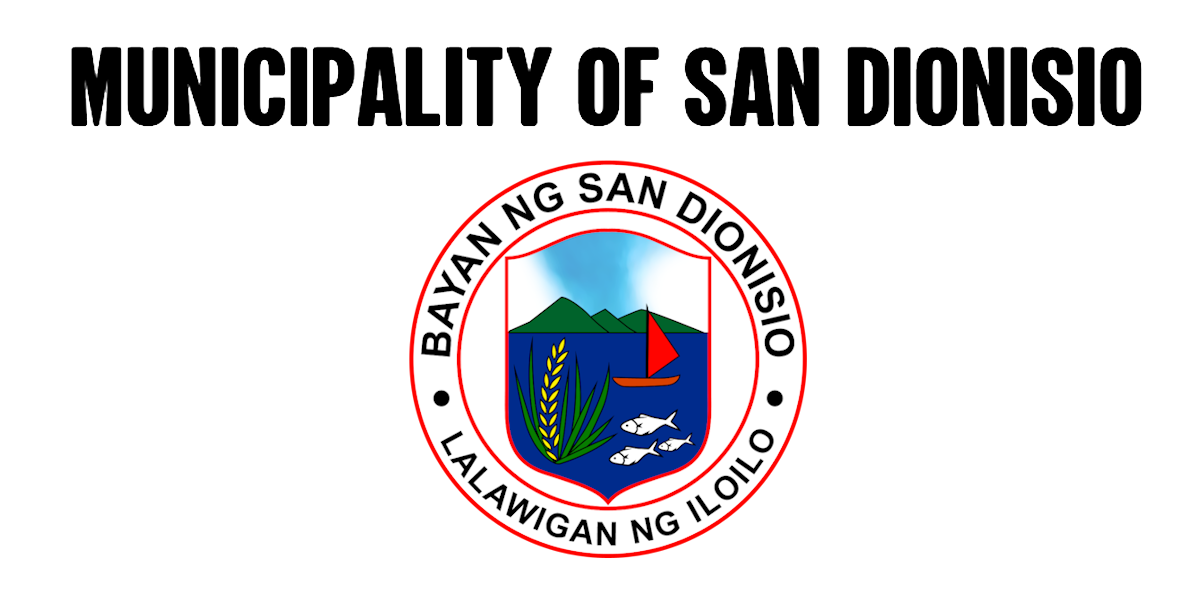
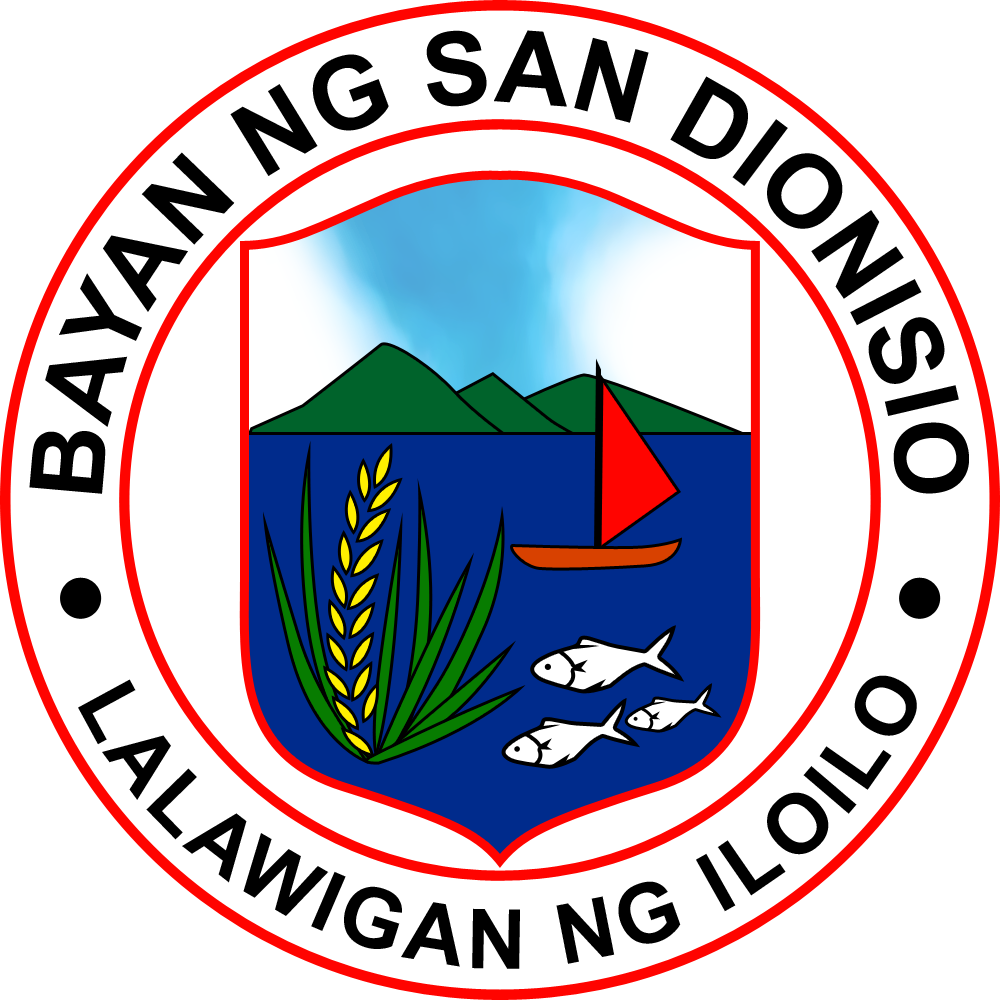
- Flag Seal

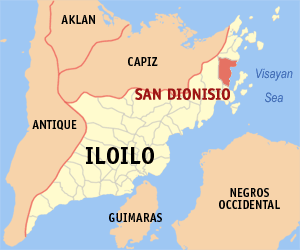
- Map of Iloilo with San Dionisio highlighted
- Interactive map of San Dionisio
- Location within the Philippines
- Coordinates: 11°16′16″N 123°05′41″E
- Country: Philippines
- Region: Western Visayas
- Province: Iloilo
- District: 5th district
- Barangays: 29 (see Barangays)

Government
  - Type: Sangguniang Bayan
  - Mayor: Sally Saliha A. Lopez (Lakas)
  - Vice Mayor: Cash A. Jacomina (Lakas)
  - Representative: Binky April M. Tupas (Lakas)
  - Municipal Council: Members: Rowena T. Lucero (Lakas); Donna Mae B. Fernandez (Lakas); Jeff D. Albania (NPC); Pio C. Villanueva, Jr. (Lakas); Andre Eugenio S. Lopez (NPC); Virgilio P. Hipolito II (NPC); Jose Edwin B. Figura (NPC); Edgar C. Olvido (Lakas); Rommel A. Lucero ^{‡}; Maria Bernadeth T. Sevigan ^{◌}; ‡ ex officio ABC president; ◌ ex officio SK chairman
  - Electorate: 26,603 voters (2025)

Area
  - Total: 127.06 km^{2} (49.06 sq mi)
- Elevation: 72 m (236 ft)
- Highest elevation: 812 m (2,664 ft)
- Lowest elevation: 0 m (0 ft)

Population (2024 census)
  - Total: 39,423
  - Density: 310.27/km^{2} (803.60/sq mi)
  - Households: 10,136

Economy
  - Income class: 2nd municipal income class
  - Poverty incidence: 20.69% (2023)
  - Revenue: ₱ 210.7 million (2024)
  - Assets: ₱ 441.2 million (2024)
  - Expenditure: ₱ 155 million (2024)
  - Liabilities: ₱ 88.67 million (2024)

Service provider
  - Electricity: Iloilo 3 Electric Cooperative (ILECO 3)
- Time zone: UTC+8 (PST)
- ZIP code: 5015
- PSGC: 063038000
- IDD : area code: +63 (0)33
- Native languages: Hiligaynon; Capisnon; Tagalog
- Website: www.sandionisio-iloilo.gov.ph

San Dionisio, officially the Municipality of San Dionisio (Hiligaynon: Banwa sang San Dionisio, Tagalog: Bayan ng San Dionisio), is a municipality in the province of Iloilo, Philippines. According to the 2024 census, it has a population of 39,423 people.

== History ==
During the Spanish Colonization of Philippines, a native leader named "Dionisio" had cleared the forest land to create a settlement called "Lakdayan". In 1877 Spanish arrived and renamed "Lakdayan" to "Dionisio" in the honor of humble fisherman founder of the settlement. Spanish converted the natives and appointed St. Vincent Ferrer as Patron Saint of the settlement. Spanish set up the municipality at Concepcion, of which Dioniso was a part of. During Spanish times, the head of the local government of Concepcion was titled "Kapitan" (captain) and the subordinate leaders in San Dionisio were titled "Tenientes" (lieutenant) and hereditary Cabeza de Barangay (head of barangay). Eventually Sara was carved out of Concepcion to establish an eponymous municipality, which also included Dionisio as one of the constituent barangay of Sara. In 1920, San Dionisio municipality was established after carving it out of Sara municipality.

== Geography ==
San Dionisio is 106 kilometres (66 mi) north of Iloilo City and 91 kilometres (57 mi) east of Roxas City. The Quiniluban Island, Tago Island and Igbon Island, extinct valconic islands known for coral reef scuba diving and beach ecotourism, lie in the east across the Concepcion Bay. The Mount Opaw, with the clear views of ocean and islands, is the tallest range with gentle slope with a single peak with trails in several directions to ascent.

=== Barangays ===
San Dionisio is politically subdivided into 29 barangays. Each barangay consists of puroks and some have sitios.

- Agdaliran
- Bagacay
- Batuan
- Bondulan
- Borongon
- Canas
- Capinang
- Amayong
- Cubay
- Cudionan
- Dugman
- Hacienda Conchita
- Madanlog
- Mandu-awak
- Moto
- Naborot
- Nipa
- Odiongan
- Pangi
- Pase
- Poblacion
- San Nicolas
- Santol
- Siempreviva
- Sua
- Talo-ato
- Tamangi
- Tiabas
- Tuble

=== Climate ===
Climate data for San Dionisio, Iloilo
Month	Jan	Feb	Mar	Apr	May	Jun	Jul	Aug	Sep	Oct	Nov	Dec	Year
Mean daily maximum °C (°F)	27 (81)	28 (82)	29 (84)	31 (88)	32 (90)	31 (88)	30 (86)	30 (86)	29 (84)	29 (84)	29 (84)	27 (81)	29 (85)
Mean daily minimum °C (°F)	23 (73)	23 (73)	23 (73)	24 (75)	25 (77)	25 (77)	24 (75)	24 (75)	24 (75)	24 (75)	24 (75)	23 (73)	24 (75)
Average precipitation mm (inches)	61 (2.4)	39 (1.5)	46 (1.8)	48 (1.9)	90 (3.5)	144 (5.7)	152 (6.0)	145 (5.7)	163 (6.4)	160 (6.3)	120 (4.7)	90 (3.5)	1,258 (49.4)
Average rainy days	12.3	9.0	9.9	10.0	18.5	25.0	27.4	26.0	25.9	24.9	17.9	14.2	221
Source: Meteoblue

San Dionisio has intermediate tropical climate, relatively dry from December to April and wet for the rest of the year. Northeast monsoon and trade winds cause the dry and sunny weather. Southeast monsoons and cyclone storms cause the wet and stormy conditions. January is the coldest month during the relatively cool tropical period from December to February. April to June summer season has the warmest temperature. High tropical temperature and the sea on eastern side cause the high relative humidity.

== Demographics ==
Population census of San Dionisio
Year	Pop.	±% p.a.
1903	4,808	—
1939	9,975	+2.05%
1948	11,008	+1.10%
1960	12,690	+1.19%
1970	15,456	+1.99%
1975	16,914	+1.82%
1980	19,410	+2.79%
1990	23,910	+2.11%
1995	25,263	+1.04%
2000	28,702	+2.77%
2007	32,171	+1.59%
2010	33,650	+1.65%
2015	38,775	+2.74%
2020	39,048	+0.15%
2024	39,423	+0.23%
Source: Philippine Statistics Authority

In the 2024 census, the population of San Dionisio was 39,423 people, with a density of 310 inhabitants per square kilometre or 800 inhabitants per square mile.

== Economy ==
Poverty incidence of San Dionisio (%)

Source: Philippine Statistics Authority

== See also ==
- Tourism in the Philippines
