= Tago Island =

Island in the Philippines

Tago
- Location within Philippines

Geography
- Coordinates: 11°14′23″N 123°7′59″E
- Archipelago: Concepcion Islands
- Adjacent to: Visayan Sea
- Highest elevation: 170 m (560 ft)

Administration
- Philippines
- Region: Western Visayas
- Province: Iloilo
- Municipality: Concepcion

Tago Island is a mountain, which is also the eponymous whole island, in northeastern Iloilo, Philippines. It is part of the municipality of Concepcion.

== Location and geography ==
Mount Tago, covering the whole Tago Island, is east of Panay Island in the Visayan Sea. Part of the Concepcion Islands, Tago is 3.2 kilometres (2 mi) west of Igbon Island and southwest of Pan de Azucar Island. Tago and Pan de Azucar are separated by the impassable Pan Pass. Tago is 170 metres (560 ft) at its highest point.

== See also ==
- List of islands in the Philippines
