= Pan de Azucar Island (Iloilo) =

Island in the Philippines

Pan de Azucar
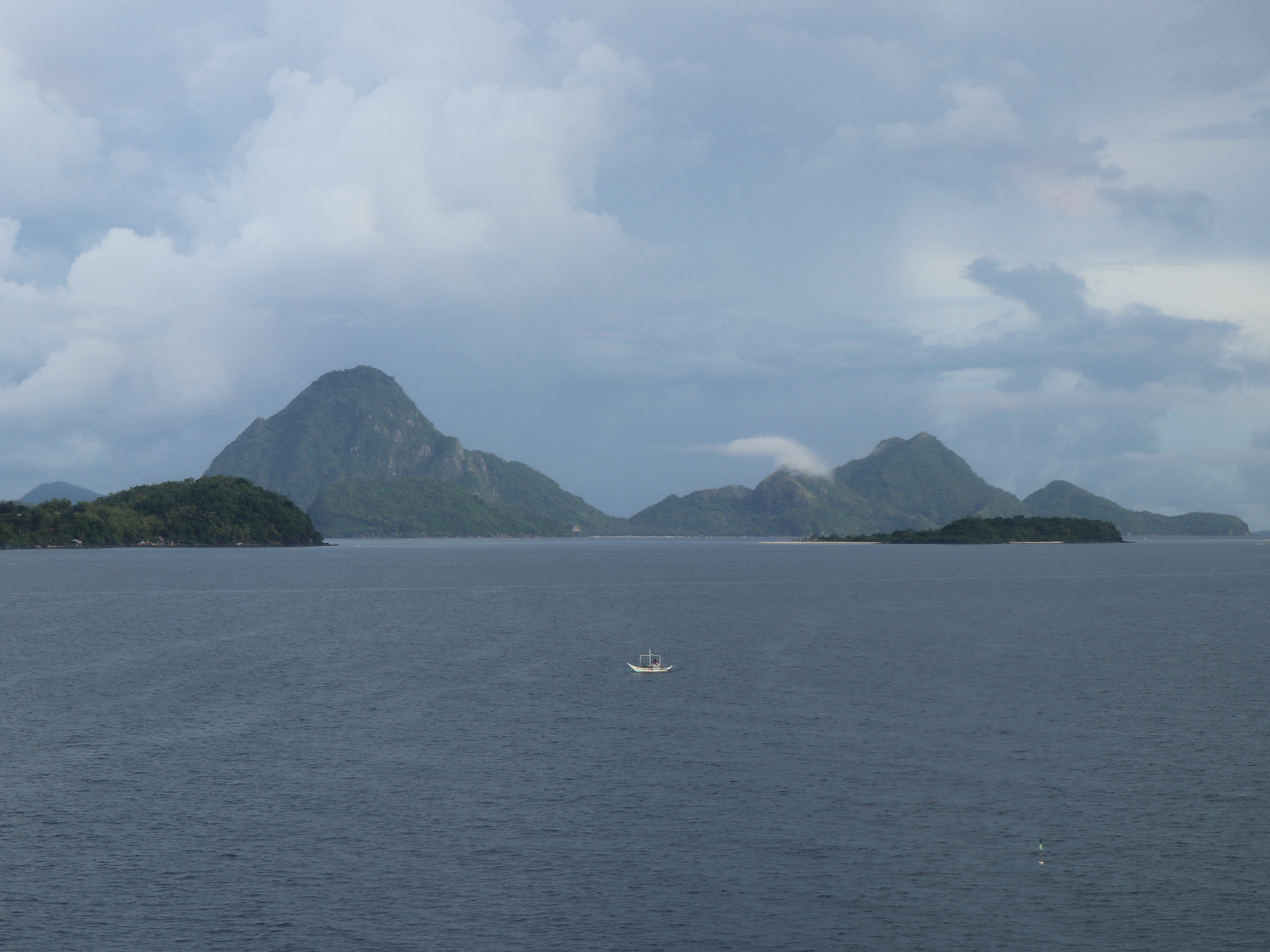

- Location within Philippines

Geography
- Coordinates: 11°16′49″N 123°10′14″E
- Archipelago: Concepcion Islands
- Adjacent to: Visayan Sea
- Area: 18.4 km^{2} (7.1 sq mi)
- Highest elevation: 574 m (1883 ft)
- Highest point: Mt. Pan de Azucar

Administration
- Philippines
- Region: Western Visayas
- Province: Iloilo
- Municipality: Concepcion
- Barangays: Macatunao; Talotu-an; Tambaliza
- Largest settlement: Tambaliza (pop. 3,139)

Demographics
- Population: 7,502 (2015)

Pan de Azucar, variously known as Tampisaw Island or Tambaliza (which is also the name of one of the barangays on the island), is a populated island in the Visayan Sea in the Philippines. The island is known for Mount Pan de Azucar (Sugarloaf Mountain) a steep volcanic cone and a prominent landmark at the northern entrance of Guimaras Strait.

Pan de Azucar is under the jurisdiction of the municipality of Concepcion, Iloilo on Panay Island, one of the largest and major islands of the Philippines. Pan de Azucar is the largest of 16 outlying islands of the town and makes up nearly 19 percent of Concepcion's total land area. According to the 2015 census, the island has a population of 7,502.

The island possibly contains valuable mineral deposits and is being studied for mineral extraction, which could possibly destroy the natural beauty of the island and mountain.

== Etymology ==
Mount Pan de Azucar (Spanish for "Sugarloaf") is one of the mountains and hills worldwide named "Sugarloaf" because of its tall conical shape resembling an old sugarloaf of the 19th century, not because of its resemblance to Sugarloaf Mountain in Rio de Janeiro, Brazil as falsely reported on some local websites.

== Geography ==
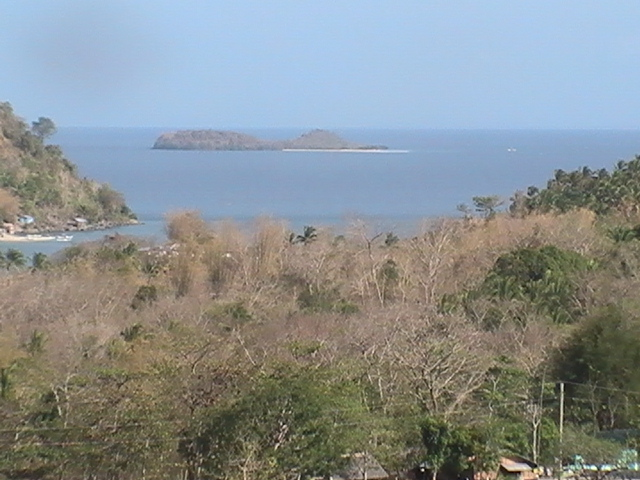
Looking out at the Visayan Sea from Mt. Manaphag

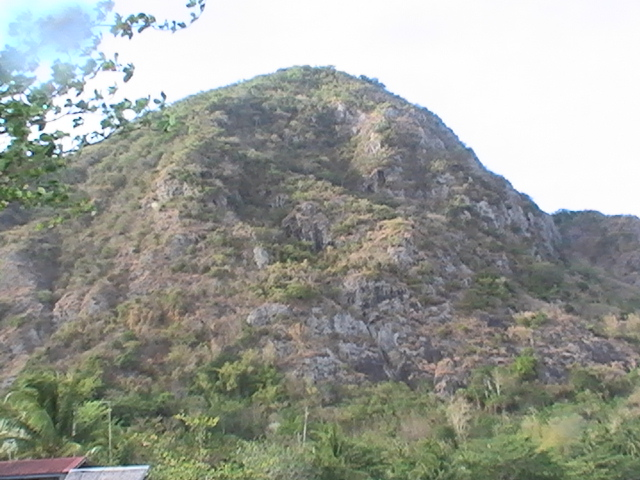
Mt. Manaphag as seen from below.

The island is located 4.0 kilometres (2.5 mi) east of Panay Island and 13 kilometres (8 mi) northeast of Concepcion town proper. Nearby islands include Sombrero Island, Naburut Island, Magaisi Island, and Bocot Islet.

At 574 metres (1,883 ft), the steep-sided Mt. Pan de Azucar (also called Mt. Manaphag) is the most prominent feature and distinguishable landmark of the island. The lofty cone is one of the inactive volcanoes in the country. The island is ringed by beaches, such as Lumpatan Beach in Bagotao, Brgy. Macatunao which are golden-yellow to white in color.

The Pan de Azucar Seascape is an area of 2,480.1478 square meters that includes both land and sea water areas around the island. Local governmental officials recognize the seascape as a protected sanctuary, although the Philippine government has yet to declare the seascape as an official protected area.

== Barangays ==
List of Barangays in Pan de Azucar island by population (2015 census).

- Tambaliza - 3,139
- Talotu-an - 2,771
- Macatunao - 1,592

== History ==
=== Early history ===
In the 1600s, a battle took place near Pan de Azucar between Filipino and Spanish forces. Captain Juan Salagao, who was mayor of Sugbú at the time, defeated Spanish forces who had come up from Mindanao, intent on burning down Arevalo and Octóng.

=== Mining ===
It has been speculated that Pan de Azucar contains possible mining deposits of gold, silver, copper, and zinc. Mindoro Resources, Ltd. began initial drilling exploration in 2012 and received initial positive results.

=== Typhoon Haiyan ===
Typhoon Haiyan passed directly over Pan de Azucar in 2013, damaging houses, food stores, and fishing boats. The Armed Forces of the Philippines (AFP) delivered relief goods to the island soon after it passed. The typhoon did not do much to disrupt mining operations on Pan de Azucar.

== Transport ==
Pan de Azucar is accessible from Concepcion by boat. There is one public boat trip per day; trips outside the official schedule are arranged with private boat owners.

== See also ==
- List of islands in the Philippines
