= Igbon Island =

Island and barangay in Iloilo, Philippines

Igbon
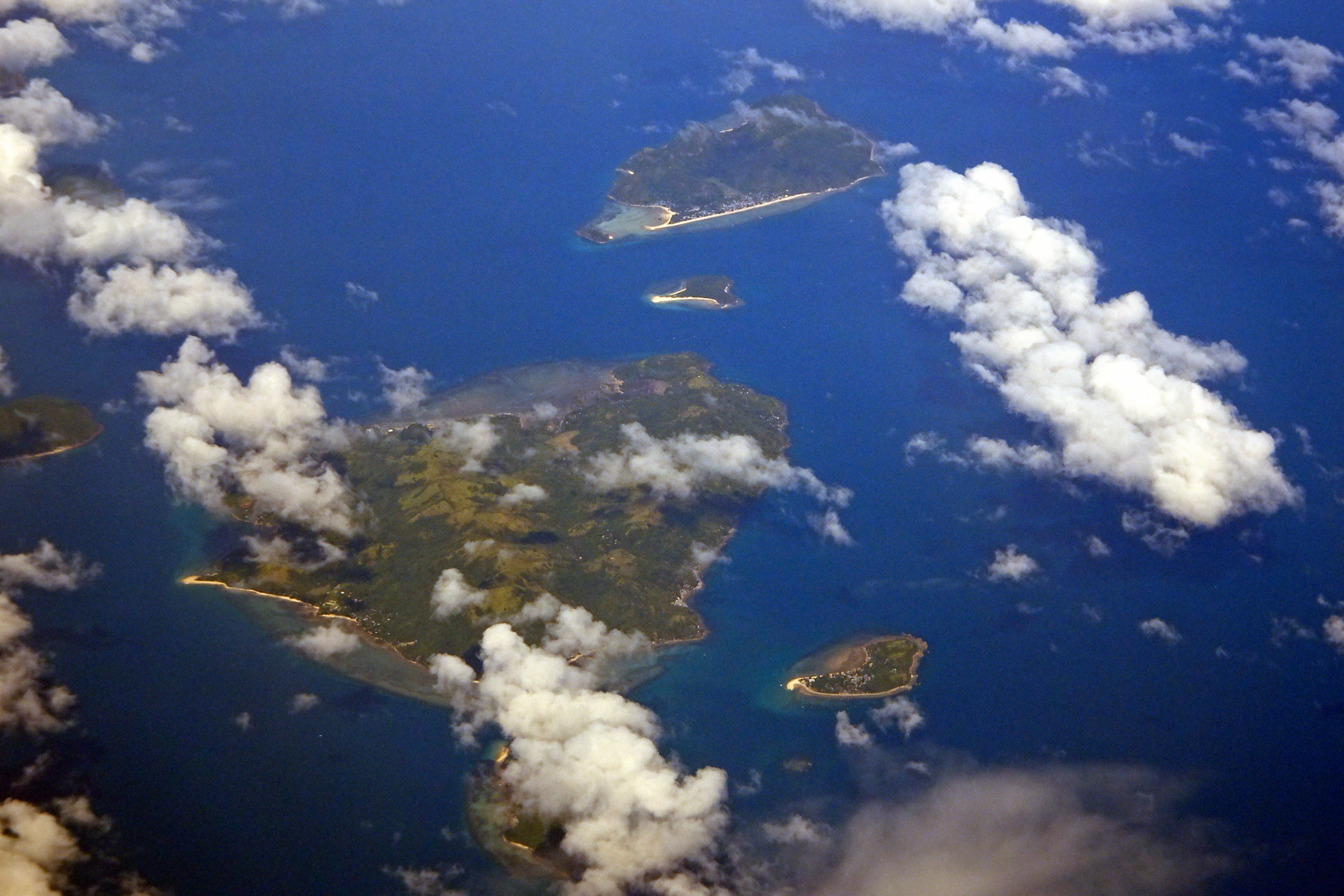
- Aerial view with Igbon Island in the center

- Location within Philippines

Geography
- Coordinates: 11°12′28″N 123°10′24″E
- Archipelago: Concepcion Islands
- Adjacent to: Visayan Sea
- Highest elevation: 774 ft (235.9 m)

Administration
- Philippines
- Region: Western Visayas
- Province: Iloilo
- Municipality: Concepcion
- Barangay: Igbon

Demographics
- Population: 2,547 (2010)

Igbon Island (variously Polopina Island or Balubadiangan Island) is an island and barangay in northeastern Iloilo, Philippines. It is part of the municipality of Concepcion. According to the 2010 census, it has a population of 2,547. The island is moderately known in the Philippines for its scuba diving.

== Location and geography ==
Igbon Island is east of Panay Island in the Visayan Sea. Part of the Concepcion Islands, it is a wooded island and is 774 feet (236 m) at its highest point. Igbon is 3.2 kilometres (2 mi) east of Tago Island. Other nearby islands include Bulubadiangan Island and Danao-Danao Island. Its sole barangay is Igbon, which has one school, the Claudia Morata Villarias Memorial School.

== Natural disasters ==
=== Guimaras oil spill ===
On 11 August 2006, a tanker capsized off the coast of Guimaras Island south of Panay. The tanker spilled over 200,000 litres (44,000 imp gal; 53,000 US gal) of oil into the Panay Gulf. By the end of August 2006, oil had covered more than 245 kilometres (152 mi) of coastline. In September 2006, the Regional Disaster Coordinating Council (RDCC) identified Igbon as one of 38 municipalities threatened by the oil spill.

=== Typhoon Haiyan ===
In 2013, Typhoon Haiyan (locally known as Yolanda) caused heavy damage to Igbon. The typhoon unexpectedly struck Igbon at low tide, although residents were able to take shelter near the mountain areas. Relief workers distributed food aid to island residents after the storm passed.

== See also ==
- List of islands in the Philippines
