= Estancia, Iloilo =

Municipality in Iloilo, Philippines

Estancia
- Municipality
- Municipality of Estancia
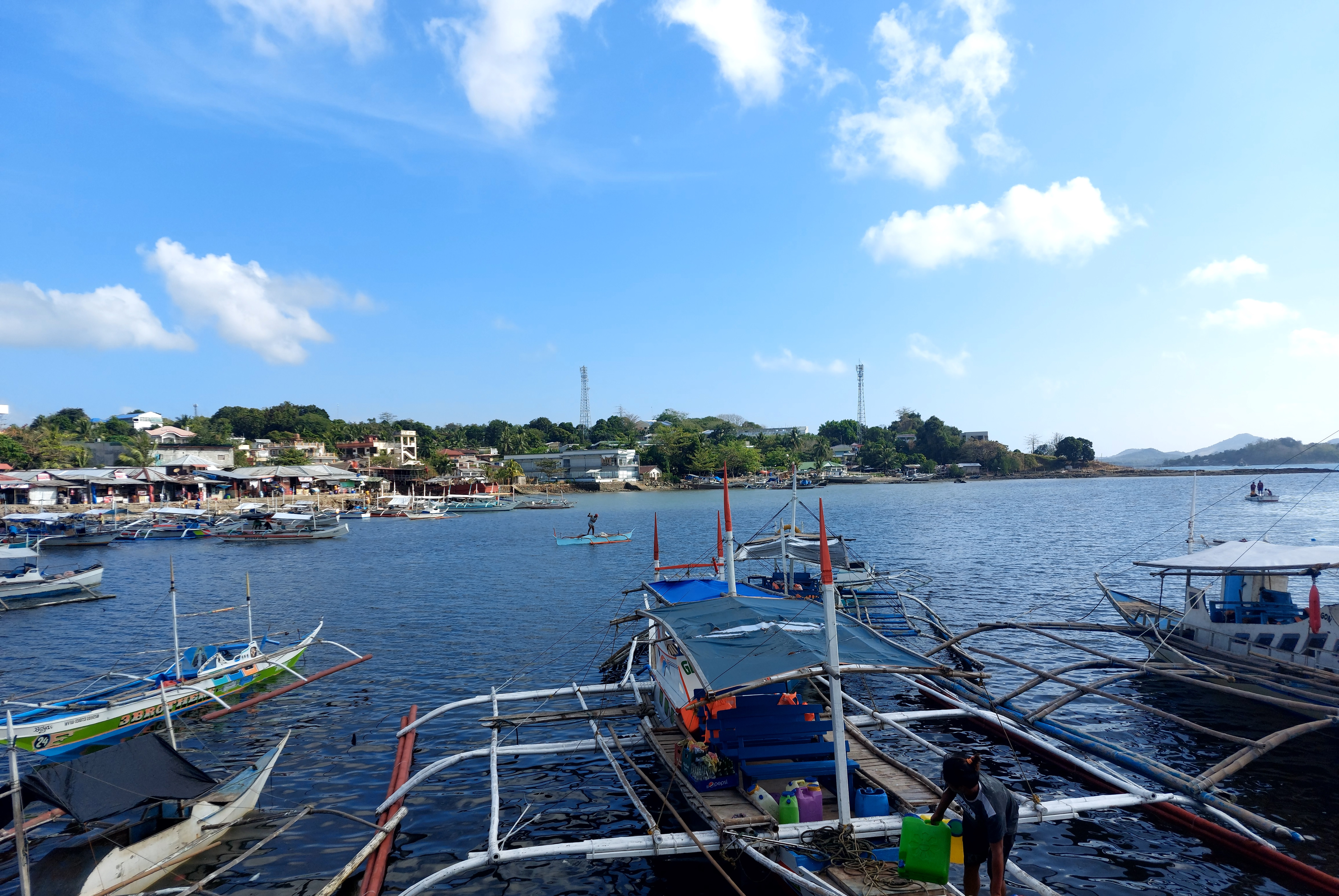
- Port of Estancia

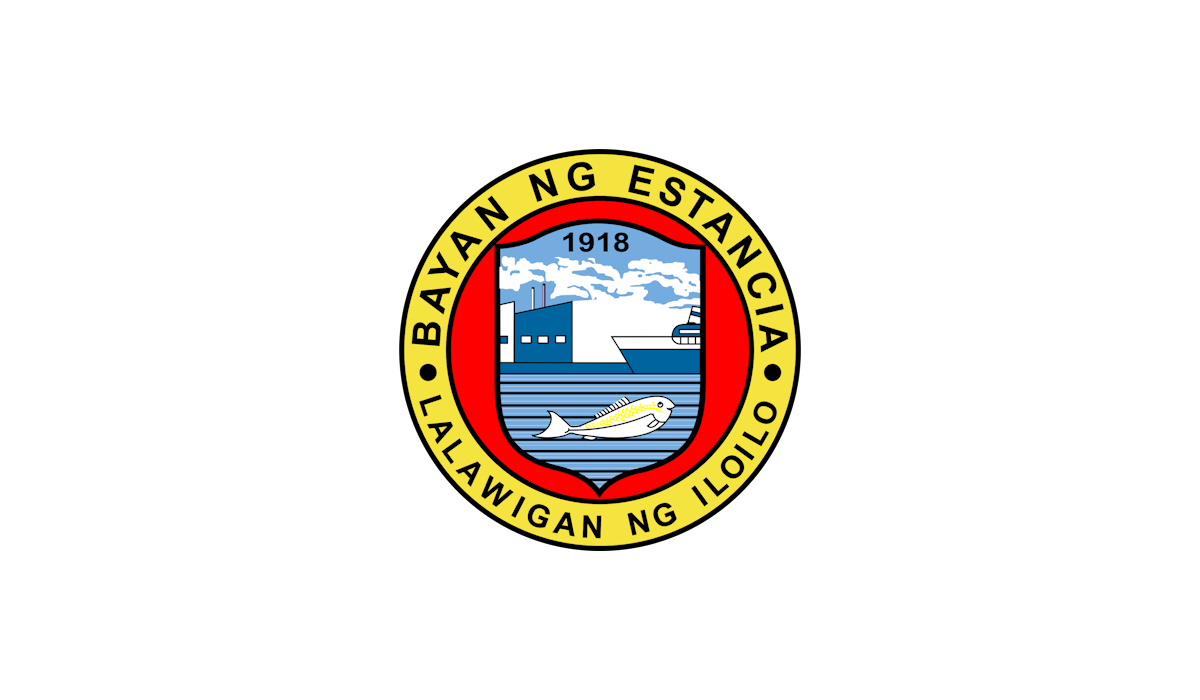
- Flag Seal
- Etymology: from Spanish "estancia" meaning ranch
- Nickname: Alaska of the Philippines
- Motto: "Kusog Uswag Estancia"
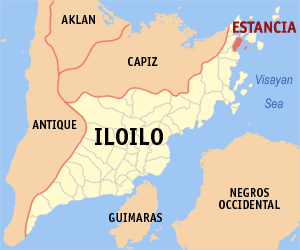
- Map of Iloilo with Estancia highlighted
- Interactive map of Estancia
- Location within the Philippines
- Coordinates: 11°27′N 123°09′E
- Country: Philippines
- Region: Western Visayas
- Province: Iloilo
- District: 5th district
- Barangays: 25 (see Barangays)

Government
  - Type: Sangguniang Bayan
  - Mayor: Ma. Angelica Bianca B. Requinto (Lakas)
  - Vice Mayor: Mark Joseph J. Cordero (Lakas)
  - Representative: Binky April M. Tupas (Lakas)
  - Municipal Council: Members: Kim Carlo E. Bisa (Lakas); Jacqueline M. Gealon (Lakas); Norberto M. Cabaobao (PFP); Louigi Donn I. Cordero (Lakas); Rey D. Bataga (PFP); Rodoel D. Aclaro, Sr. (Lakas); Roy Harold A. Malunda (Lakas); Bobby B. Gadayan (Lakas); Arleen T. Bacos, Sr. ^{‡}; Emmanuel J. Tingson ^{◌}; ‡ ex officio ABC president; ◌ ex officio SK chairman
  - Electorate: 36,518 voters (2025)

Area
  - Total: 29.38 km^{2} (11.34 sq mi)
- Elevation: 15 m (49 ft)
- Highest elevation: 316 m (1,037 ft)
- Lowest elevation: 0 m (0 ft)

Population (2024 census)
  - Total: 54,882
  - Density: 1,868/km^{2} (4,838/sq mi)
  - Households: 13,282

Economy
  - Income class: 1st municipal income class
  - Poverty incidence: 17.82% (2023)
  - Revenue: ₱ 235.9 million (2024)
  - Assets: ₱ 605.2 million (2024)
  - Expenditure: ₱ 173.3 million (2024)
  - Liabilities: ₱ 101.3 million (2024)

Service provider
  - Electricity: Iloilo 3 Electric Cooperative (ILECO 3)
- Time zone: UTC+8 (PST)
- ZIP code: 5017
- PSGC: 063019000
- IDD : area code: +63 (0)33
- Native languages: Hiligaynon; Capisnon; Tagalog
- Website: www.estancia.gov.ph

Estancia (ɛsˈtanʃa), officially the Municipality of Estancia (Hiligaynon: Banwa sang Estancia, Tagalog: Bayan ng Estancia), is a municipality in the province of Iloilo, Philippines. According to the 2024 census, it has a population of 54,882 people.

== History ==
According to the tradition of the place, Estancia was originally a ranch owned by a wealthy Spaniard named Rodrigo who married a local woman. A more detailed version says that a rich Spaniard named Don Felipe Aguilar bought vast tracts of land in the island of Panay, stretching from Punta Bacay in Dumangas, Iloilo up to Tuang-tuang Kambang Bato between Ibajay and Kalibo, Aklan. Covering the whole of Northern Iloilo, and the entire territory of old Capiz, Don Felipe converted the land into an estancia, which is the Spanish word for "cattle ranch". Estancia is not known for its agricultural products nor livestock but rather for its location as it is adjacent to Carles' impressive marine resources. Estancia has a fish port and a pier - these being one of the most developed in Northern Visayas, a banking industry, cable television, a hospital (adjacent only, that belongs to the Municipality of Balasan) and resorts.

Estancia is known around the country as a center for commercial fishing, so much so that it shares to carries the name "Alaska of the Philippines". This reflects back from the early 1900s up to pre-World War II when major commercial fishing activities were within Carles fishing ground and a small portion of Estancia water territory, with bountiful catches, running out a place to process and preserve their catch ended up rotting by beaches. Commercial fishing boats from Cebu, Capiz, Samar, Leyte, Masbate, and Negros came to Carles to fish. As a testament to its location adjacent to Carles' bountiful marine resources. The reason for this is that Carles lies in the Visayan Sea triangle, an imaginary triangle extending from the provinces of Iloilo, Negros, Cebu, Samar, and Masbate. This triangle is a part of the "Sulu-Sulawesi Triangle" of the Sulu Sea and neighboring Indonesia where a large concentration of marine organisms coupled with climate conditions support a massive marine ecosystem. Various commercial species are harvested along Carles' waters, namely mackerel, barracuda, sardines, shad, pompano, grouper, squid, cuttlefish, shrimp, prawns, shells, seaweed and others, these all catch from Carles' water territory and brought to fish ports of Estancia and Bancal, Carles.

The method predominantly used are purse seining, trawling and gill netting as these are suited for the relatively shallow waters (up to 60 fathoms) of the Visayan Sea.

However, as of recent years, pollution, heavy overfishing, and irresponsible fishing practices have slowly diminished the once abundant fish stocks of Estancia, and now problems like diminishing catches and unpredictable weather are beginning to surface. These factors have raised awareness in the government as well as the private sector and currently an artificial reef is off the shore of Brgy. Paon in an attempt to provide juvenile fish with shelter in hopes of restocking these once populous waters. For now, Estancia is experiencing an influx of investments as Gaisano Grand put up their first mall in the 5th District of Iloilo, also Prince Hypermart and some malls like CityMall shows interest to come in.

== Geography ==
Estancia is located in the northern part of the province and is 131 kilometres (81 mi) from the provincial capital, Iloilo City, and 66 kilometres (41 mi) from Roxas City.

=== Barangays ===
Estancia is politically subdivided into 25 barangays. Each barangay consists of puroks and some have sitios.

- Lumbia (Ana Cuenca)
- Bayas
- Bayuyan
- Botongon
- Bulaqueña
- Calapdan
- Cano-an
- Daan Banua
- Daculan
- Gogo
- Jolog
- Loguingot
- Malbog
- Manipulon
- Pa-on
- Villa Pani-an
- Poblacion Zone I
- Poblacion Zone II
- Poblacion Zone III
- Lonoy (Roman Mosqueda)
- San Roque
- Santa Ana
- Tabu-an
- Tacbuyan
- Tanza

=== Climate ===
Climate data for Estancia, Iloilo
Month	Jan	Feb	Mar	Apr	May	Jun	Jul	Aug	Sep	Oct	Nov	Dec	Year
Mean daily maximum °C (°F)	27 (81)	28 (82)	29 (84)	31 (88)	32 (90)	31 (88)	30 (86)	30 (86)	29 (84)	29 (84)	29 (84)	27 (81)	29 (85)
Mean daily minimum °C (°F)	23 (73)	23 (73)	23 (73)	24 (75)	25 (77)	25 (77)	24 (75)	24 (75)	24 (75)	24 (75)	24 (75)	23 (73)	24 (75)
Average precipitation mm (inches)	61 (2.4)	39 (1.5)	46 (1.8)	48 (1.9)	90 (3.5)	144 (5.7)	152 (6.0)	145 (5.7)	163 (6.4)	160 (6.3)	120 (4.7)	90 (3.5)	1,258 (49.4)
Average rainy days	12.3	9.0	9.9	10.0	18.5	25.0	27.4	26.0	25.9	24.9	17.9	14.2	221
Source: Meteoblue

== Demographics ==
Population census of Estancia
Year	Pop.	±% p.a.
1903	2,461	—
1939	7,608	+3.18%
1948	8,781	+1.61%
1960	13,323	+3.53%
1970	16,510	+2.17%
1975	17,907	+1.64%
1980	19,817	+2.05%
1990	27,229	+3.23%
1995	30,673	+2.26%
2000	35,842	+3.39%
2007	39,479	+1.34%
2010	42,666	+2.87%
2015	48,546	+2.49%
2020	53,200	+1.95%
2024	54,882	+0.75%
Source: Philippine Statistics Authority

In the 2024 census, the population of Estancia was 54,882 people, with a density of 1,900 inhabitants per square kilometre or 4,900 inhabitants per square mile.

== Economy ==
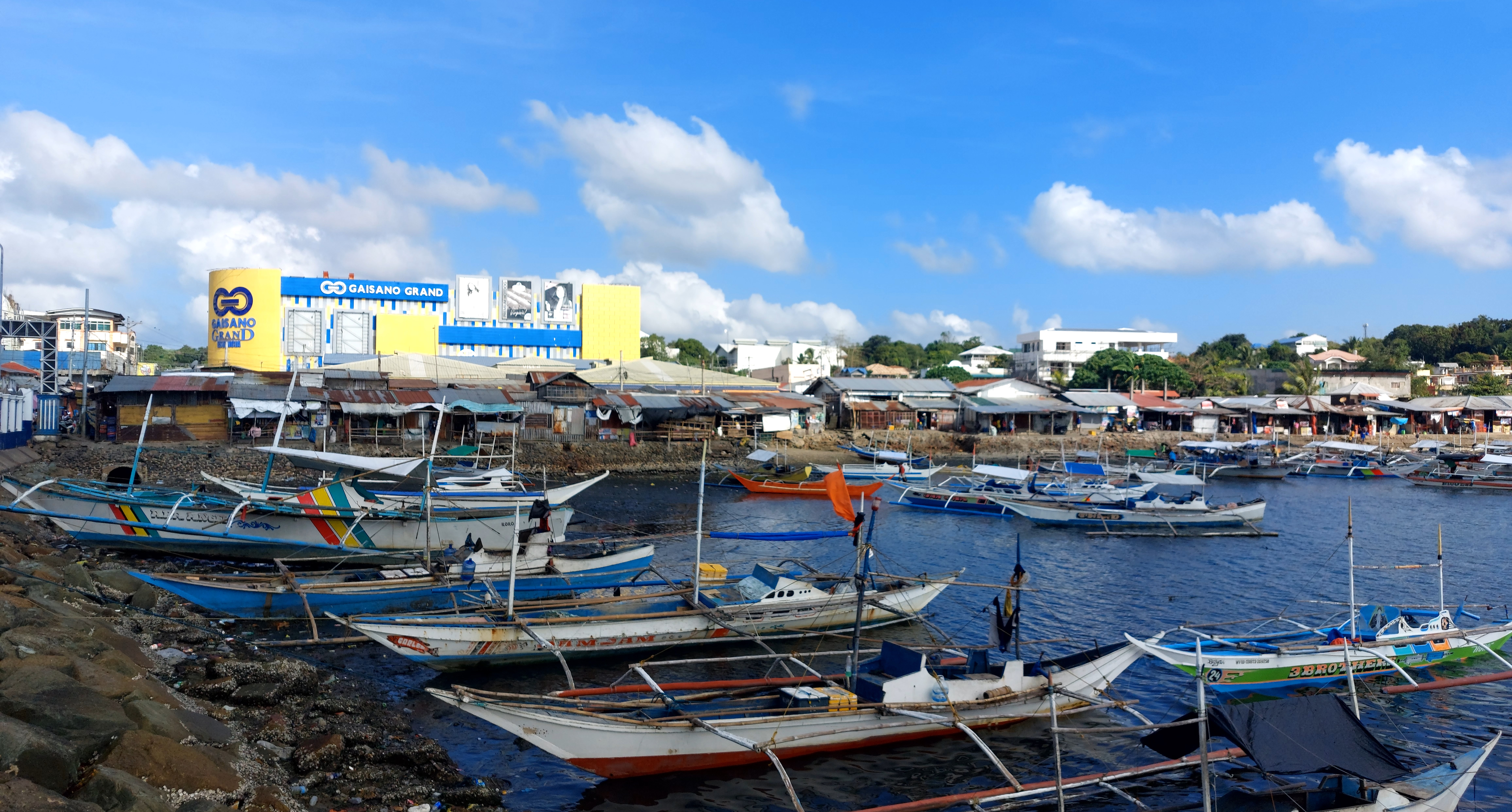
Estancia Fish Port

Poverty incidence of Estancia (%)

Source: Philippine Statistics Authority

== Education ==
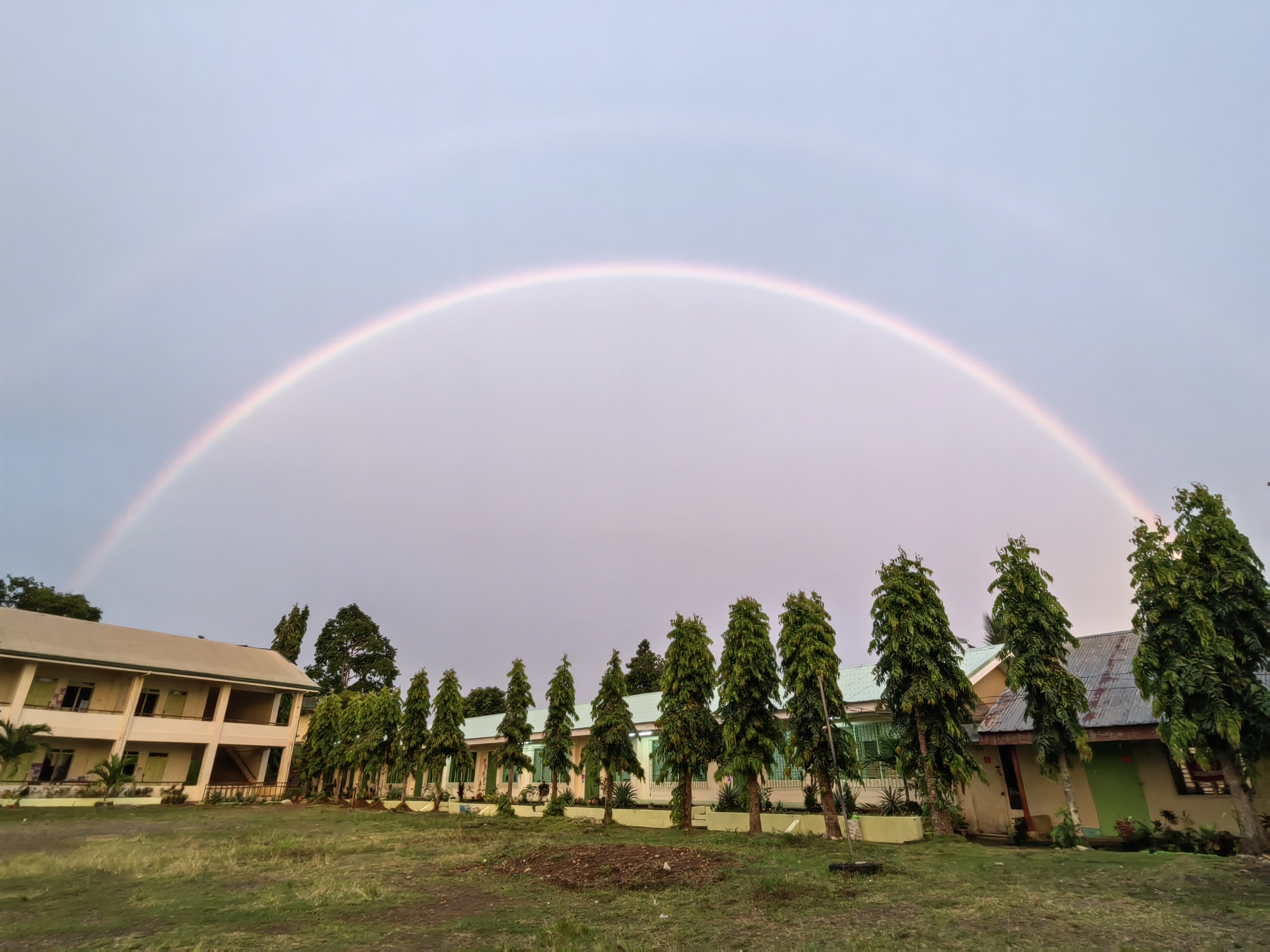
Estancia National High School

The Estancia Schools District Office governs all educational institutions within the municipality. It oversees the management and operations of all private and public, from primary to secondary schools.

=== Primary and elementary schools ===
- Bayas Elementary School
- Botongon Elementary School
- Cano-an Elementary School
- Estancia Central Elementary School
- Estancia Seventh-Day Adventist Elementary School
- Iloilo King of Glory Christian Academy, Inc.
- Loguingot Elementary School
- Malbog Elementary School
- Paon Elementary School
- Saint Candida School - Hijas de Jesus, Inc.
- San Roque Elementary School
- Tanza Elementary School

=== Secondary schools ===
- Andres S. Ravena Integrated School
- Bayas National High School
- Estancia National High School
- Iloilo King of Glory Christian Academy, Inc.
- Lumbia Integrated School
- Northern Iloilo State University - Laboratory Junior High School
- Saint Candida School - Hijas de Jesus, Inc.

=== Higher educational institution ===
- Northern Iloilo State University (Main campus)

== Culture and festivals ==
Estancia celebrates Panagat Festival, its annual municipal festival typically observed either on the 3rd or 4th week of April. It is centered on the bountiful catch of different fish and seafood as well as the local fishermen in the community. The festival highlights the "Sugbanahay sa Panagat" where locals grill different fresh fish and seafood in the main streets for everyone to enjoy, also the coveted crown of "Lin-ay sang Panagat".

Apart from its municipal festival, Estancia also annually celebrates its religious town feast on October 7 in honor of its patroness, Queen of the Most Holy Rosary (Our Lady of the Rosary).

== Natural disasters ==
=== Typhoon Haiyan ===
Parts of Estancia were heavily damaged by Typhoon Haiyan. The roof of Northern Iloilo State University (NISU: Estancia) was completely torn off. Estancia Central School was also hit by the said typhoon and almost all of the classrooms were totally damaged. The Principal (Dr. Gerry J. Tingson) of the said school with his utmost will is now trying to restore the damages caused by typhoon Haiyan through national and foreign aid. Other parts of the town that suffered damage included the market and the port.

== Media ==
- 90.5 DYSV Radyo Himulat (Subic Broadcasting Corporation)
- 91.5 Radyo Natin / Hot FM
- 106.7 Radyo Natin / Hearts FM
- List of Radio & Television Station in Iloilo
