= Concepcion, Iloilo =

Municipality in Iloilo, Philippines

Concepcion
- Municipality
- Municipality of Concepcion
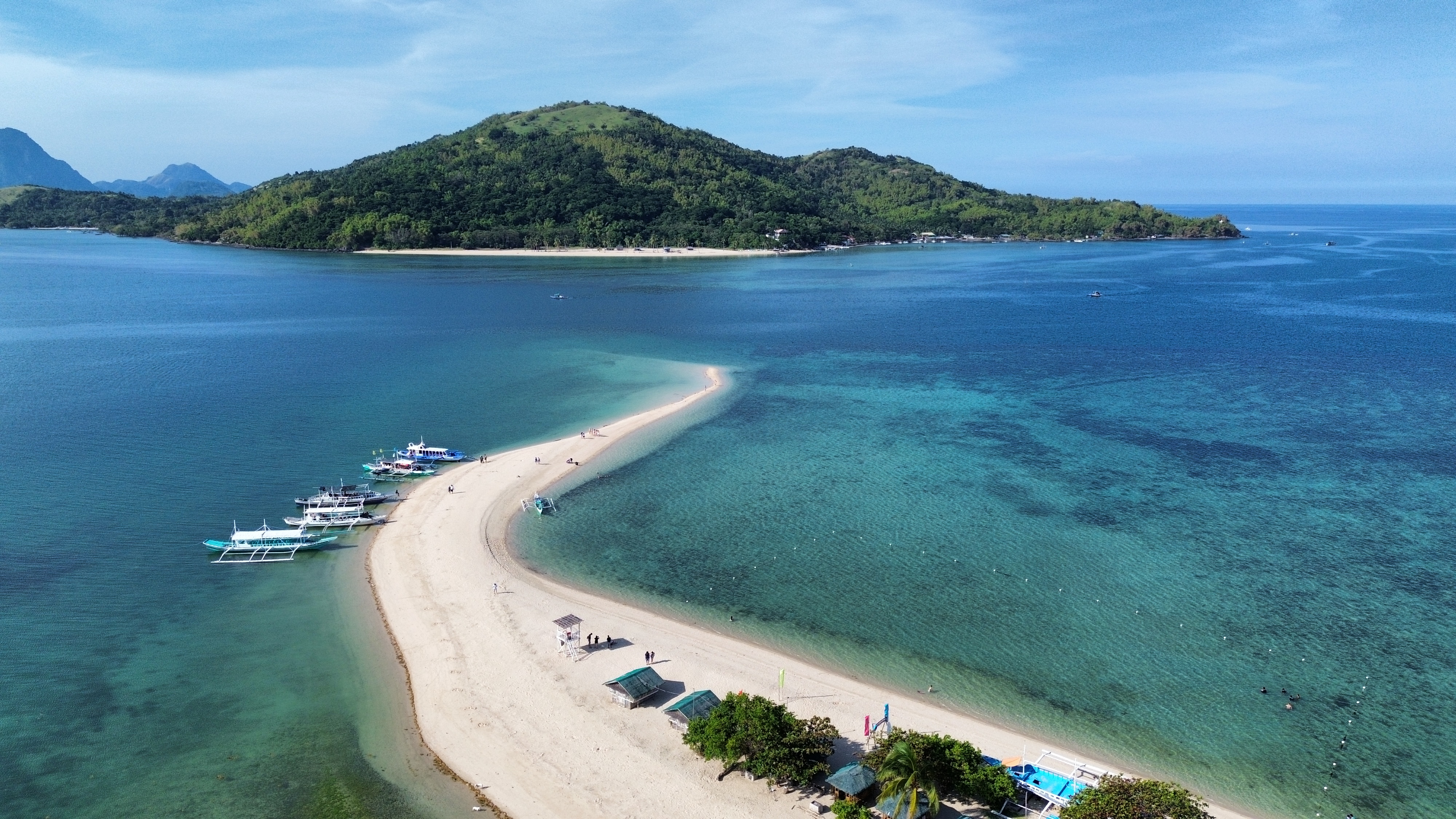
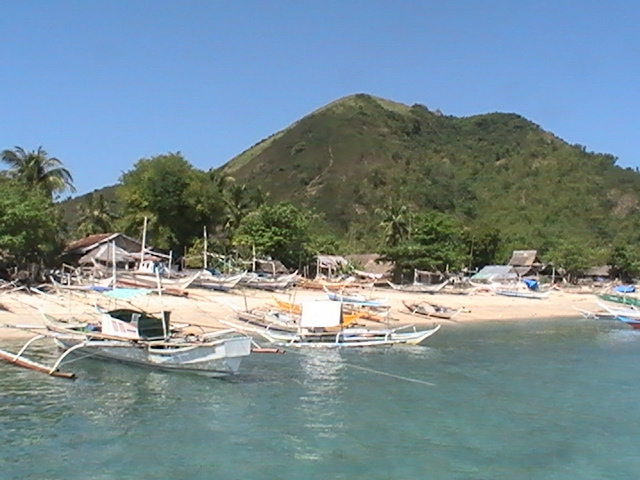
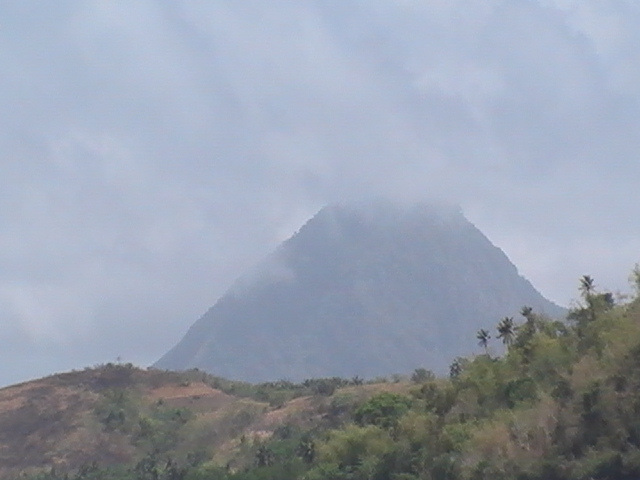
- (from top: left to right) Bulubadiangan Island, Malangabang Island and Pan de Azucar Island.

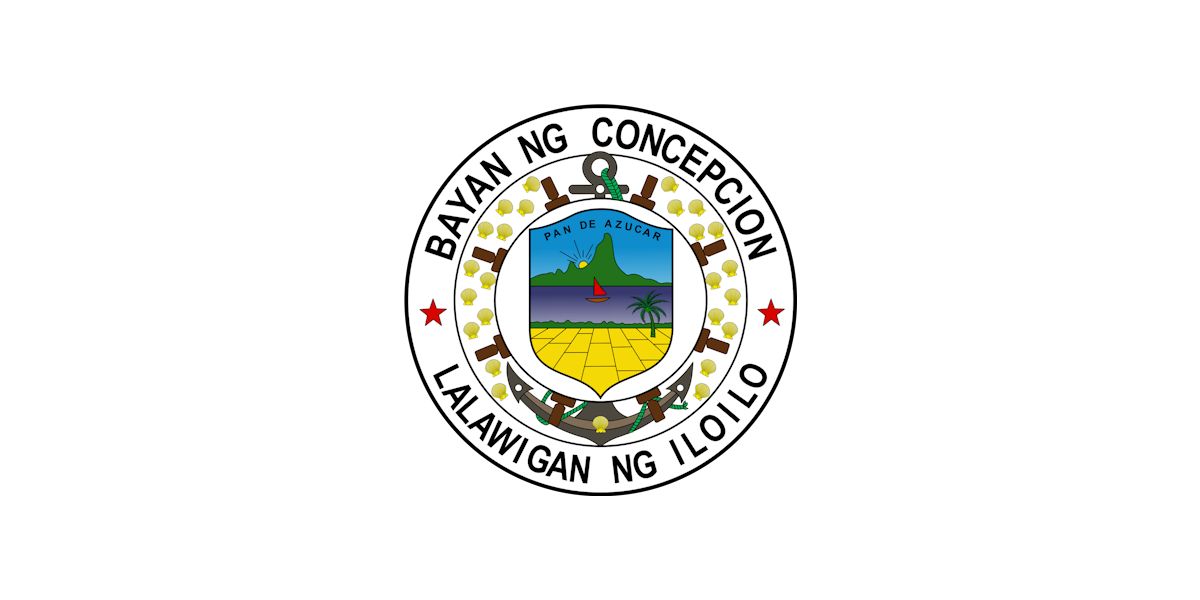
- Flag Seal

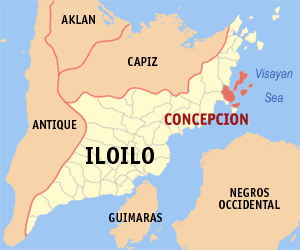
- Map of Iloilo with Concepcion highlighted
- Interactive map of Concepcion
- Location within the Philippines
- Coordinates: 11°12′N 123°06′E
- Country: Philippines
- Region: Western Visayas
- Province: Iloilo
- District: 5th district
- Barangays: 25 (see Barangays)

Government
  - Type: Sangguniang Bayan
  - Mayor: Milliard S. Villanueva (Lakas)
  - Vice Mayor: Jovelyn O. Estrada (Lakas)
  - Representative: Binky April M. Tupas (Lakas)
  - Municipal Council: Members: SJ W. Salcedo (Lakas); Jovic C. Manderico (Lakas); Nonny N. Villarias (Ind); Amy O. Gabo (Ind); Mark Ruffin C. Villaruz (PFP); Rainier N. Balida (Lakas); Rubenie C. Garilva (Lakas); Cristen Mary O. Orpeza (PFP); Delfin Gregorio ^{‡}; Mark Bryan G. Pandes ^{◌}; ‡ ex officio ABC president; ◌ ex officio SK chairman
  - Electorate: 28,927 voters (2025)

Area
  - Total: 86.12 km^{2} (33.25 sq mi)
- Elevation: 29 m (95 ft)
- Highest elevation: 430 m (1,410 ft)
- Lowest elevation: 0 m (0 ft)

Population (2024 census)
  - Total: 45,737
  - Density: 531.1/km^{2} (1,376/sq mi)
  - Households: 11,191

Economy
  - Income class: 1st municipal income class
  - Poverty incidence: 24.09% (2023)
  - Revenue: ₱ 258.2 million (2024)
  - Assets: ₱ 692.4 million (2024)
  - Expenditure: ₱ 239 million (2024)
  - Liabilities: ₱ 177.9 million (2024)

Service provider
  - Electricity: Iloilo 3 Electric Cooperative (ILECO 3)
- Time zone: UTC+8 (PST)
- ZIP code: 5013
- PSGC: 063015000
- IDD : area code: +63 (0)33
- Native languages: Hiligaynon; Capisnon; Tagalog

Concepcion, officially the Municipality of Concepcion (Hiligaynon: Banwa sang Concepcion, Tagalog: Bayan ng Concepcion), is a municipality in the province of Iloilo, Philippines. According to the 2024 census, it has a population of 45,737 people.

It was the capital of the Comandancia de Concepcion, a unit equivalent to a sub-province headed by a Corregidor, before it was merged with the Province of Iloilo.

== History ==
Concepcion was originally known as Bacjawan, which means "the place of the bacjaw trees," which used to grow in large numbers along the coast's swampy areas. It was formally founded as a pueblo (town) in 1855. The town was later renamed to Concepcion, in honor of the first born daughter of Felizardo Azucena, the town's first captain basal, or gobernadorcillo.

Location of Comandancia de Concepción highlighted in red.

In 1857, the Comandancia de Concepción (Military District of Concepcion) was created. It was a sub-province in Northern Iloilo composed of the capital town of Concepcion, Ajuy, Balasan (modern-day Batad, Estancia, and Balasan), Lemery, San Dionisio, and Sara. It was abolished on April 11, 1901, when the Americans took control of the Philippines and established the civil government of Iloilo. In present days, the former Comandancia de Concepción covers the 5th legislative district of Iloilo except for the towns of Barotac Viejo and San Rafael.

== Geography ==
Concepcion is situated in the northeastern part of Panay Island (known as the mainland), along with approximately 16 smaller surrounding islands. It is bordered to the north by San Dionisio, to the south by Ajuy, to the west by Sara, and to the east by the Visayan Sea. The municipality covers a total land area of 9,702.04 hectares.

Concepcion is 97 kilometres (60 mi) from Iloilo City and 101 kilometres (63 mi) from Roxas City.

The largest of the 16 Concepcion Islands is Pan de Azucar at 1,840 hectares (4,500 acres), which has the 573 metres (1,880 ft) high Mount Manaphag rising from its center.

=== Climate ===
Climate data for Concepcion, Iloilo
Month	Jan	Feb	Mar	Apr	May	Jun	Jul	Aug	Sep	Oct	Nov	Dec	Year
Mean daily maximum °C (°F)	27 (81)	28 (82)	29 (84)	31 (88)	32 (90)	31 (88)	30 (86)	30 (86)	29 (84)	29 (84)	29 (84)	27 (81)	29 (85)
Mean daily minimum °C (°F)	23 (73)	23 (73)	23 (73)	24 (75)	25 (77)	25 (77)	24 (75)	24 (75)	24 (75)	24 (75)	24 (75)	23 (73)	24 (75)
Average precipitation mm (inches)	61 (2.4)	39 (1.5)	46 (1.8)	48 (1.9)	90 (3.5)	144 (5.7)	152 (6.0)	145 (5.7)	163 (6.4)	160 (6.3)	120 (4.7)	90 (3.5)	1,258 (49.4)
Average rainy days	12.3	9.0	9.9	10.0	18.5	25.0	27.4	26.0	25.9	24.9	17.9	14.2	221
Source: Meteoblue (modeled/calculated data, not measured locally)

=== Barangays ===
Concepcion is politically subdivided into 25 barangays. Each barangay consists of puroks and some have sitios.

There are 11 barangays which are island barangays, and the rest are located in the mainland of Panay Island.

- Aglosong
- Agnaga
- Bacjawan Norte
- Bacjawan Sur
- Bagongon
- Batiti
- Botlog
- Calamigan
- Dungon
- Igbon
- Jamul-awon
- Lo-ong
- Macalbang
- Macatunao
- Malangabang
- Maliogliog
- Nińo
- Nipa
- Plandico
- Poblacion
- Polopińa (Bulubadiangan Island)
- Salvacion
- Talotu-an
- Tambaliza (Pan de Azucar Island)
- Tamis-ac

== Demographics ==
Population census of Concepcion
Year	Pop.	±% p.a.
1903	4,565	—
1939	8,446	+1.72%
1948	9,184	+0.94%
1960	11,183	+1.65%
1970	15,743	+3.47%
1975	18,554	+3.35%
1980	21,121	+2.62%
1990	28,355	+2.99%
1995	30,111	+1.13%
2000	34,240	+2.79%
2007	36,881	+1.03%
2010	39,617	+2.64%
2015	43,159	+1.64%
2020	44,633	+0.71%
2024	45,737	+0.59%
Source: Philippine Statistics Authority

In the 2024 census, the population of Concepcion was 45,737 people, with a density of 530 inhabitants per square kilometre or 1,400 inhabitants per square mile.

== Economy ==
Poverty incidence of Concepcion (%)

Source: Philippine Statistics Authority

The primary industry of the people of Concepcion is in fishing. The Visayan Sea, where Concepcion is situated, is one of the most prolific in fish production and provides a significant proportion of fish in the region. In 2007, the number of registered fishermen stood at 7,957. Fishing is followed second by farming, with much of it being subsistence farming. The principle cash crops are rice, corn and vegetables, along with bamboo and coconuts. Poultry and livestock are raised for local consumption.

Poverty incidence was extremely high in the early 21st century, with 87% of the population being below the government poverty line in 2000, with a reduction to 47% in 2004. A contributing factor was the rapidity of population growth in the municipality, with a growth rate of 2.76% in 2002, or four babies being born every day in the municipality.

== Education ==
There is one institution of higher learning in the municipality, Northern Iloilo State University (NISU: Concepcion), which offers bachelor's degrees in fisheries and agriculture, as well as a master's in public administration.

The Concepcion Schools District Office governs all educational institutions within the municipality. It oversees the management and operations of all private and public, from primary to secondary schools.

=== Primary and elementary schools ===
- Aglosong Elementary School
- Miape-Aro Primary School
- Bacjawan Norte Primary School
- Bacjawan Sur Elementary School
- Bagongon Primary School
- Bagotao Primary School
- Baliguian Primary School
- Borres Posadas Elementary School
- Botlog Primary School
- Calamigan Elementary School
- Claudia Morata Villarias Memorial Scool
- Concepcion Central School
- Danao-Danao Primary School
- David Posadas Sr. Memorial School
- Domingo Y. Sobremonte Memorial School
- Donato Valderrama Primary School
- Dungon Primary School
- Fernando A. Arlos Memorial School
- Guinmisahan Primary School
- Jamul-awon Elementary School
- Liburon Primary School
- Lo-ong Elementary School
- Macalbang Elementary School
- Maliog-liog Elementary School
- Martin Azuelo Memorial School
- Narciso Centeno Elementary School
- Nino-Plandico Elementary School
- Nipa Elementary School
- Polopiña Elementary School
- Punting Primary School
- Salvacion Elementary School
- Sanggutan Elementary School
- St. Isidore Integrated School
- St. Mary the Anawim of God Institute
- Tagbak Primary School
- Taloto-an Elementary School
- Tamis-ac Elementary School

=== Secondary schools ===
- Concepcion BEC Academy
- Crisanto M. Ciriaco Integrated School
- Deogracias G. Arlos National High School
- Loong National High School
- Polopiña National High School
- Roberto H. Tirol High School

== Tourism ==
Concepcion includes islands with white sand beaches and sandbars, such as Bulobadiangan Island, Agho Island, and Pan de Azucar.

== Culture ==
The annual Tampisaw Festival, held the fourth week of April on four of the islands, attracts tourism.

== Infrastructure ==
=== Concepcion Power Station ===
The Concepcion Power Station is a 270-megawatt (MW) coal-fired power plant located by the coast of Barangay Nipa, Concepcion, Iloilo. The plant is sponsored by the Palm Concepcion Power Corporation (PCPC), a subsidiary of real estate company A Brown Company. Currently Unit 1 of the station has begun operating since August 2016 while Unit 2 is planned for 2019.

== Notable personalities ==
- Paulino Alcantara (1896-1964), Filipino footballer for FC Barcelona

== See also ==
- Concepcion (military district)
