= Visayan Sea =

Sea in the Philippines between Masbate, Leyte, Cebu, Negros and Panay

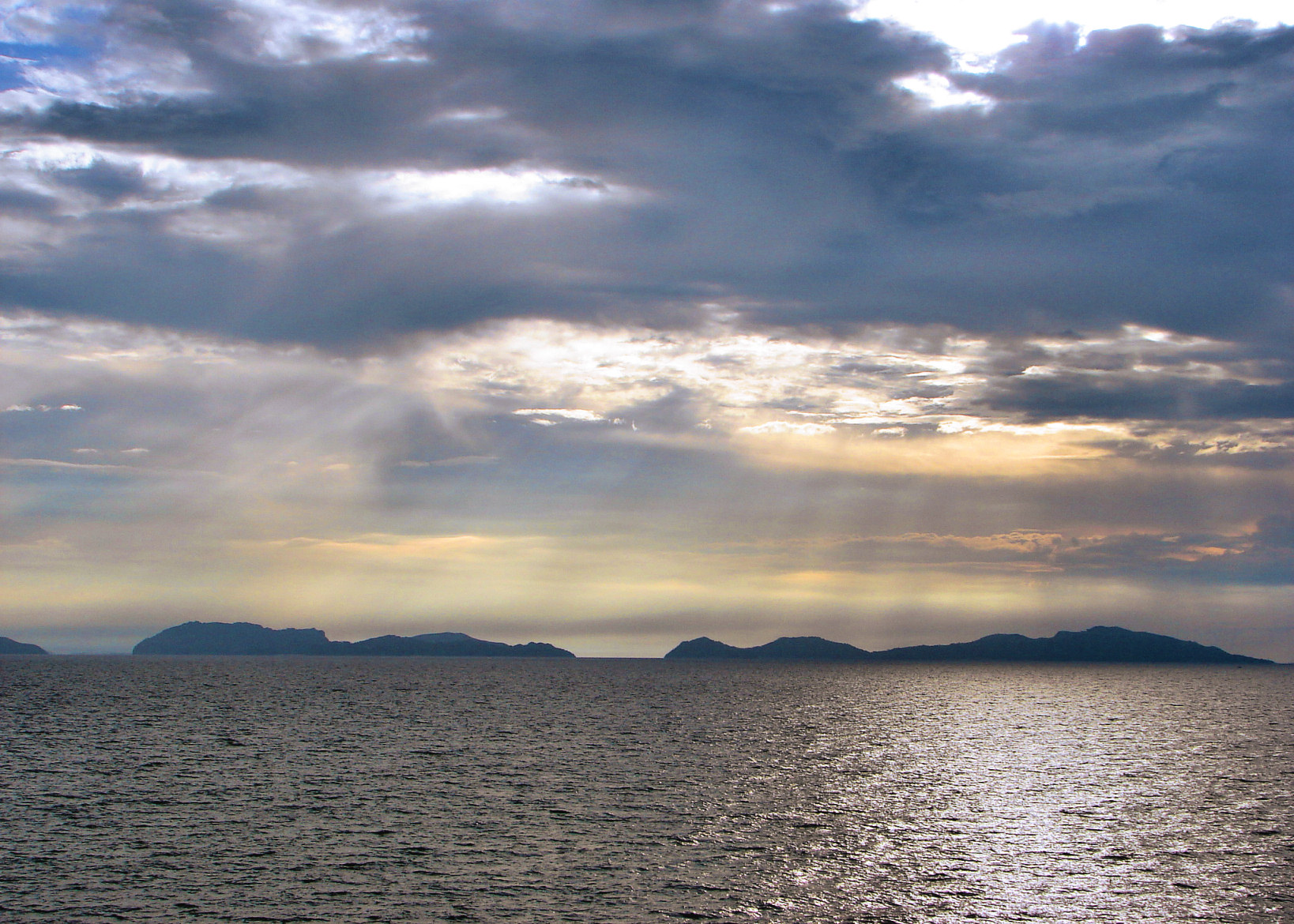
- Islas de Gigantes in the Visayan Sea

- Location within the Philippines Visayan Sea (Philippines)
- Location: Bicol Region; Visayas
- Coordinates: 11°30′00″N 123°40′00″E
- Type: sea
- Etymology: Visayas
- Basin countries: Philippines

The Visayan Sea is a sea in the Philippines surrounded by the islands of the Visayas. It is bounded by the islands Masbate to the north, Panay to the west, Leyte to the east, and Cebu and Negros to the south.

The sea is connected to several bodies of water: the Sibuyan Sea to the northwest via the Jintotolo Channel, the Samar Sea to the northeast, the Guimaras Strait to the southwest which leads to Panay Gulf, the Tañon Strait to the south, and the Camotes Sea to the southeast.

The largest island within this sea is Bantayan Island of Cebu province.

The sea is a major fishing ground for sardines, mackerel, and herring the Philippines. In 2020, the Western Visayas accounts for 20 percent of sardines total production in the Philippines. The sea covers an area of roughly 10,000 km^{2} (3,900 sq mi) with 22 municipalities along its coastline. A closed season is imposed annually from November 15 to March 15 in portions of the sea through Fisheries Administrative Order (FAO) 167 since 1989.
