= Vicente Piccio Jr. =

Philippine general

The Honorable Vicente Mondéjar Piccio

Mayor of Belison
- In office 2007 – January 2009
- Preceded by: Christopher Piccio

Commanding General of the Philippine Air Force
- In office April 5, 1982 – February 1986

Personal details
- Born: Vicente Piccio y Mondéjar; March 1, 1927; Iloílo, Iloílo, Philippine Islands
- Died: April 28, 2015 (aged 88); Belison, Antique, Philippines
- Resting place: Libingan ng mga Bayani
- Citizenship: Philippine
- Spouse: Nena Hernández Piccio
- Children: Vincent Bernard; Elizabeth Mary; Philip Gregory; Bernard; Robert Ephrem; Christopher; Paul Anthony
- Profession: Soldier

Military service
- Rank: Major general

Vicente Mondéjar Piccio (March 1, 1927–April 28, 2015) was a Philippine Air Force major general.

== Career ==
Piccio entered the Philippine Air Force Flying School in 1949 and graduated in 1951. Commissioned as second lieutenant in the reserve force, he was assigned as flight commander and instructor at Fernando Air Base in Lipa. A year later, he transferred to Basa Air Base in Floridablanca where he transitioned in the P-51 Mustang. In 1954, he completed the Squadron Officers Course at the Air Force Officer School. He was promoted to first lieutenant on December 2, 1954, and integrated into the regular force on 29 December 1955. He was promoted to captain on 7 April 1956. He was appointed Division Commander of the 3rd Air Division in 1978 and promoted to brigadier general on 11 July 1979. On 16 July 1980, he was designated as the commanding officer of the Aviation Security Command and in 1981 became the vice-commander of the Philippine Air Force in concurrent capacity. In the same year, he was appointed president of Military Commission Number 5. After a year, on April 5, 1982, he became commanding general of the Philippine Air Force. On May 2 of the same year he was promoted to major general.

Piccio was responsible for issuing in 1985 a directive banning taxpayer-subsidized Philippine Air Force personnel from traveling or gaining employment abroad “without presidential clearance or authority”.

=== People Power Revolution ===
Piccio was noted as having been the commander of the Philippine Air Force during the 1986 People Power Revolution. During the revolution, he lost effective control over the air force after the defection of a number of elite helicopter pilots, led by Col. Antonio Sotelo, from the 15th Strike Wing. These pilots, in turn, provided air cover for the rebel forces under Defense Minister Juan Ponce-Enrile and Philippine Constabulary Chief Lt. Gen. Fidel V. Ramos

The loss of the elite air-force pilots, analysts and historians say, was key to the eventual success of the four-day civilian-backed nonviolent revolution that toppled the Marcos administration. For his loyalty to the formal chain of command under Chief of Staff Fabián Ver, Piccio was branded as a "stooge".

== Personal life ==
Piccio was born in Iloilo City to a family from the Karay-a town of Dueñas. He grew up in Maasin, another Karay-a town. He later married Nena Hernández of Belison, Antique and with her had seven children: Vincent Bernard, Elizabeth Mary, Philip Gregory “Dobol P”, Bernard, Robert Ephrem, Christopher and Paul Anthony. He had 7 grandchildren including: Alexandra Piccio, Christopher "C. J." Piccio, Robert Piccio Jr, Paula Piccio, Ariana Castrence, and Julian “Ian” Castrence. He died on April 28, 2015, in Belison.
