= General Piccio =

General Piccio may refer to:

- Pier Ruggero Piccio (1880–1965), Italian Air Force general
- Vicente Piccio Jr. (1927-2015), Philippine Air Force general
