= Nogas Island =

Island in Antique, Philippines

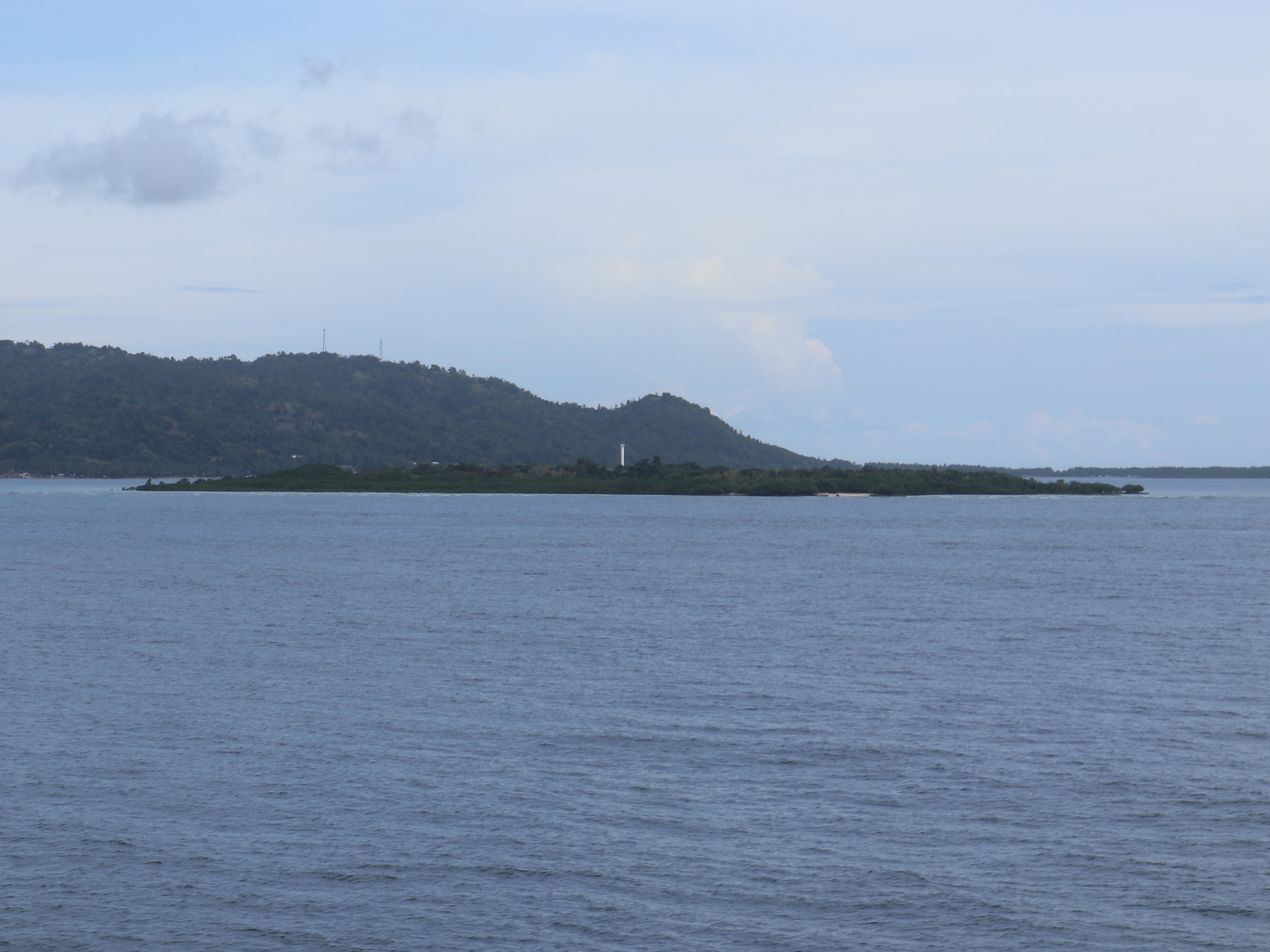

- Location within Philippines

Geography
- Coordinates: 10°25′4″N 121°55′10″E
- Adjacent to: Sulu Sea

Administration
- Philippines
- Region: Western Visayas
- Province: Antique

Nogas is a 24-hectare (59-acre) government naval reservation island in Antique Province, Philippines. It is 4.8 kilometres (3 mi) from the shoreline of Anini-y town proper and can be accessed by sailboat or motorboat within 20 minutes.
