= Laua-an =

Municipality in Antique, Philippines

- Municipality
- Municipality of Laua-an
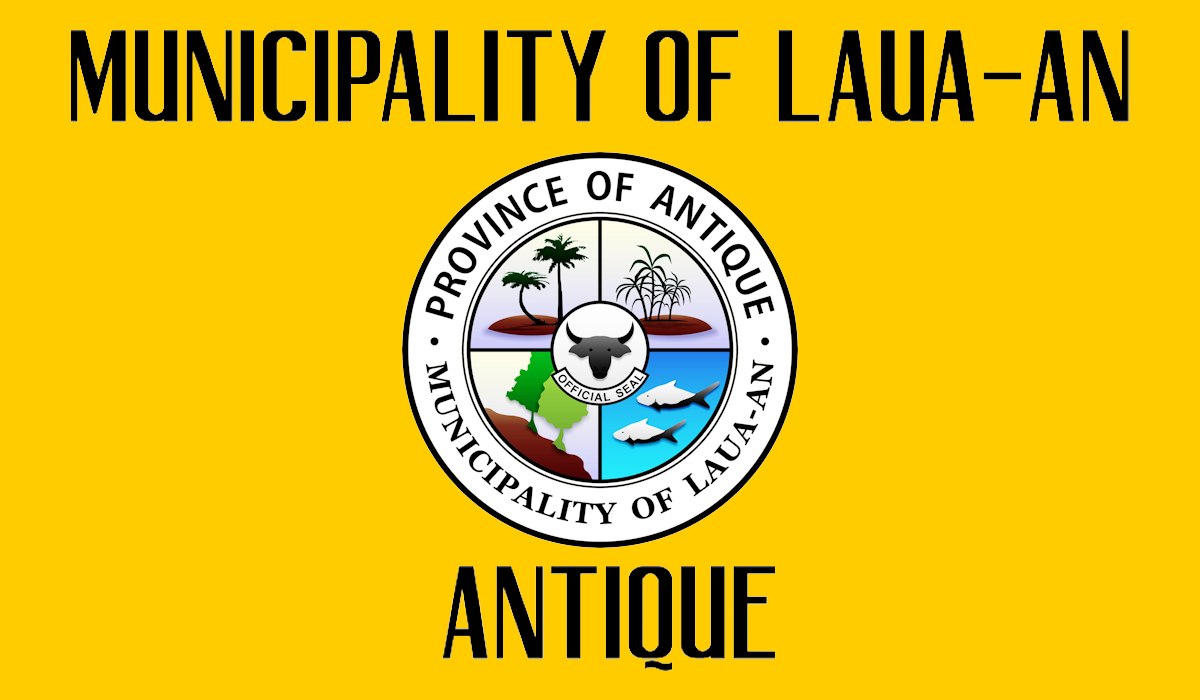
- Flag

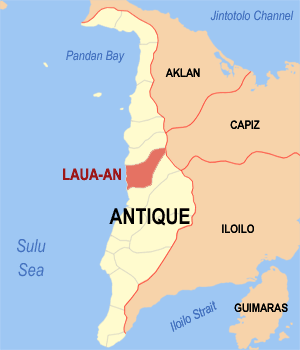
- Map of Antique with Laua-an highlighted
- Interactive map of Laua-an
- Location within the Philippines
- Coordinates: 11°08′35″N 122°02′30″E
- Country: Philippines
- Region: Western Visayas
- Province: Antique
- District: Lone district
- Founded: January 1, 1915
- Barangays: 40 (see Barangays)

Government
  - Type: Sangguniang Bayan
  - Mayor: Aser S. Baladjay Sr.
  - Vice Mayor: Dr. John Raph A. Asoy
  - Representative: Antonio A. Legarda Jr.
  - Municipal Council: Members: Bing Nietes; Jerry Samillano; Pinoy Baladjay; Pajoy Fabila; Roldan Jungco; Charleen Ann Saturnino; Robert Espartero; Alfredo Sumaray Jr.
  - Electorate: 19,965 voters (2025)

Area
  - Total: 100.72 km^{2} (38.89 sq mi)
- Elevation: 228 m (748 ft)
- Highest elevation (Mount Dumara): 1,287 m (4,222 ft)
- Lowest elevation: 0 m (0 ft)

Population (2024 census)
  - Total: 28,177
  - Density: 279.76/km^{2} (724.56/sq mi)
  - Households: 6,674

Economy
  - Income class: 3rd municipal income class
  - Poverty incidence: 22% (2023)
  - Revenue: ₱ 151 million (2024)
  - Assets: ₱ 471.2 million (2024)
  - Expenditure: ₱ 30.77 million (2024)
  - Liabilities: ₱ 118.3 million (2024)

Service provider
  - Electricity: Antique Electric Cooperative (ANTECO)
- Time zone: UTC+8 (PST)
- ZIP code: 5705
- PSGC: 060609000
- IDD : area code: +63 (0)36
- Native languages: Karay-a; Hiligaynon; Tagalog
- Website: laua-an.gov.ph

Laua-an, officially the Municipality of Laua-an (Kinaray-a: Banwa kang Laua-an; Hiligaynon: Banwa sang Laua-an; Tagalog: Bayan ng Laua-an), is a municipality in the province of Antique, Philippines. According to the 2024 census, it has a population of 28,177 people.

== History ==
Laua-an, once known as Nalupa Nuevo, had already been a pueblo before the Spanish-American War, led by Capitan Luis Sarmiento.

When the Filipino-American War erupted and Barbaza’s municipal hall was burned, its government operations were moved temporarily to Laua-an. Under Capitan Justiniano Barrientos, a decision was approved in 1908 to return the municipal seat to Barbaza.

Many residents of Laua-an and Guisijan later appealed for Laua-an to be restored as an independent town and offered to build a new municipal hall themselves. Laua-an regained its status as a separate municipality on January 1, 1915 through Executive Order No. 129.

== Geography ==
Laua-an is 56 kilometres (35 mi) from the provincial capital, San Jose de Buenavista.

According to the Philippine Statistics Authority, the municipality has a land area of 100.72 square kilometres (38.89 sq mi) constituting 3.69% of the 2,729.17-square-kilometre- (1,053.74 sq mi) total area of Antique.

=== Barangays ===
Laua-an is politically subdivided into 40 barangays. Each barangay consists of puroks and some have sitios.

Laua-an is composed of 12 coastal barangays, while the remaining barangays are inland or upland, situated along the Paningayan and Cairawan rivers. The municipality contains a total of 85 sitios. Its total land area is approximately 18,692.46 hectares, representing 7.41% of the total land area of Antique Province. Of this, 7,832.22 hectares (42%) are classified as alienable and disposable land, while 10,860.23 hectares (58%) are timberland. According to a 2009 survey conducted by the Municipal Social Welfare and Development Office (MSWDO), Laua-an had a total population of 26,959, consisting of 13,468 males and 13,491 females, across 5,392 households.

| PSGC | Barangay | Population | | | ±% p.a. | |
| | | 2024 | | 2010 | | |
|---|---|---|---|---|---|---|
| 060609043 | Bagongbayan | 2.5% | 706 | 659 | ▴ | 0.48% |
| 060609002 | Banban | 0.5% | 147 | 129 | ▴ | 0.91% |
| 060609003 | Bongbongan | 0.9% | 250 | 265 | ▾ | −0.40% |
| 060609004 | Cabariwan | 2.3% | 660 | 620 | ▴ | 0.44% |
| 060609005 | Cadajug | 4.1% | 1,153 | 1,110 | ▴ | 0.26% |
| 060609006 | Canituan | 2.0% | 568 | 572 | ▾ | −0.05% |
| 060609007 | Capnayan | 1.3% | 365 | 319 | ▴ | 0.94% |
| 060609008 | Casit-an | 4.3% | 1,200 | 1,157 | ▴ | 0.25% |
| 060609010 | Guiamon | 0.9% | 249 | 239 | ▴ | 0.28% |
| 060609009 | Guinbanga-an | 6.7% | 1,879 | 1,864 | ▴ | 0.06% |
| 060609011 | Guisijan | 8.5% | 2,404 | 2,382 | ▴ | 0.06% |
| 060609012 | Igtadiao | 1.0% | 294 | 262 | ▴ | 0.80% |
| 060609013 | Intao | 2.3% | 660 | 672 | ▾ | −0.13% |
| 060609014 | Jaguikican | 3.1% | 874 | 896 | ▾ | −0.17% |
| 060609015 | Jinalinan | 0.7% | 202 | 220 | ▾ | −0.59% |
| 060609016 | Lactudan | 0.9% | 247 | 274 | ▾ | −0.72% |
| 060609017 | Latazon | 1.7% | 476 | 494 | ▾ | −0.26% |
| 060609018 | Laua-an | 1.3% | 379 | 349 | ▴ | 0.57% |
| 060609020 | Liberato | 1.5% | 411 | 463 | ▾ | −0.82% |
| 060609021 | Lindero | 5.9% | 1,649 | 1,560 | ▴ | 0.39% |
| 060609022 | Liya-liya | 1.5% | 422 | 395 | ▴ | 0.46% |
| 060609019 | Loon | 2.6% | 743 | 735 | ▴ | 0.08% |
| 060609023 | Lugta | 2.6% | 719 | 576 | ▴ | 1.55% |
| 060609024 | Lupa-an | 2.0% | 559 | 557 | ▴ | 0.02% |
| 060609025 | Magyapo | 0.9% | 257 | 242 | ▴ | 0.42% |
| 060609026 | Maria | 4.7% | 1,311 | 1,364 | ▾ | −0.27% |
| 060609027 | Mauno | 1.9% | 524 | 457 | ▴ | 0.95% |
| 060609028 | Maybunga | 1.9% | 525 | 343 | ▴ | 3.00% |
| 060609029 | Necesito (Paniatan) | 1.1% | 307 | 339 | ▾ | −0.69% |
| 060609030 | Oloc | 4.1% | 1,168 | 994 | ▴ | 1.13% |
| 060609031 | Omlot | 0.9% | 260 | 233 | ▴ | 0.76% |
| 060609032 | Pandanan | 1.3% | 359 | 346 | ▴ | 0.26% |
| 060609034 | Paningayan | 1.4% | 384 | 360 | ▴ | 0.45% |
| 060609035 | Pascuala | 0.7% | 194 | 202 | ▾ | −0.28% |
| 060609036 | Poblacion (Centro) | 7.0% | 1,975 | 1,933 | ▴ | 0.15% |
| 060609038 | San Ramon | 0.6% | 167 | 139 | ▴ | 1.28% |
| 060609039 | Santiago | 2.4% | 670 | 622 | ▴ | 0.52% |
| 060609040 | Tibacan | 0.6% | 177 | 230 | ▾ | −1.80% |
| 060609041 | Tigunhao | 1.2% | 343 | 375 | ▾ | −0.62% |
| 060609042 | Virginia | 0.8% | 235 | 263 | ▾ | −0.78% |
| | Total | | 28,177 | 25,211 | ▴ | 0.78% |

=== Climate ===
Climate data for Laua-an, Antique
| Month | Jan | Feb | Mar | Apr | May | Jun | Jul | Aug | Sep | Oct | Nov | Dec | Year |
|---|---|---|---|---|---|---|---|---|---|---|---|---|---|
| Mean daily maximum °C (°F) | 30 (86) | 31 (88) | 32 (90) | 33 (91) | 32 (90) | 30 (86) | 29 (84) | 29 (84) | 29 (84) | 29 (84) | 30 (86) | 30 (86) | 30 (87) |
| Mean daily minimum °C (°F) | 22 (72) | 22 (72) | 22 (72) | 24 (75) | 25 (77) | 25 (77) | 25 (77) | 25 (77) | 25 (77) | 24 (75) | 23 (73) | 22 (72) | 24 (75) |
| Average precipitation mm (inches) | 48 (1.9) | 41 (1.6) | 58 (2.3) | 82 (3.2) | 223 (8.8) | 300 (11.8) | 346 (13.6) | 307 (12.1) | 311 (12.2) | 292 (11.5) | 167 (6.6) | 81 (3.2) | 2,256 (88.8) |
| Average rainy days | 11.4 | 7.7 | 11.3 | 15.4 | 25.7 | 28.5 | 29.5 | 28.7 | 28.3 | 28.7 | 21.8 | 15.2 | 252.2 |
Source: Meteoblue (modeled/calculated data, not measured locally)

== Demographics ==
Population census of Laua-an
| Year | Pop. | ±% p.a. |
|---|---|---|
| 1903 | 8,915 | — |
| 1918 | 10,340 | +0.99% |
| 1939 | 12,614 | +0.95% |
| 1948 | 15,438 | +2.27% |
| 1960 | 12,967 | −1.44% |
| 1970 | 15,461 | +1.77% |
| 1975 | 17,498 | +2.51% |
| 1980 | 18,785 | +1.43% |
| 1990 | 19,865 | +0.56% |
| 1995 | 21,069 | +1.11% |
| 2000 | 23,258 | +2.14% |
| 2007 | 23,808 | +0.32% |
| 2010 | 25,211 | +2.11% |
| 2015 | 26,072 | +0.64% |
| 2020 | 26,580 | +0.41% |
| 2024 | 28,177 | +1.41% |
Source: Philippine Statistics Authority

In the 2024 census, Laua-an had a population of 28,177 people. The population density was 280 inhabitants per square kilometre (730/sq mi).

=== Language ===
Kinaray-a is the main dialect of Laua-an while Hiligaynon is also spoken and understood in the municipality.

== Economy ==
Poverty incidence of Laua-an (%)

Source: Philippine Statistics Authority

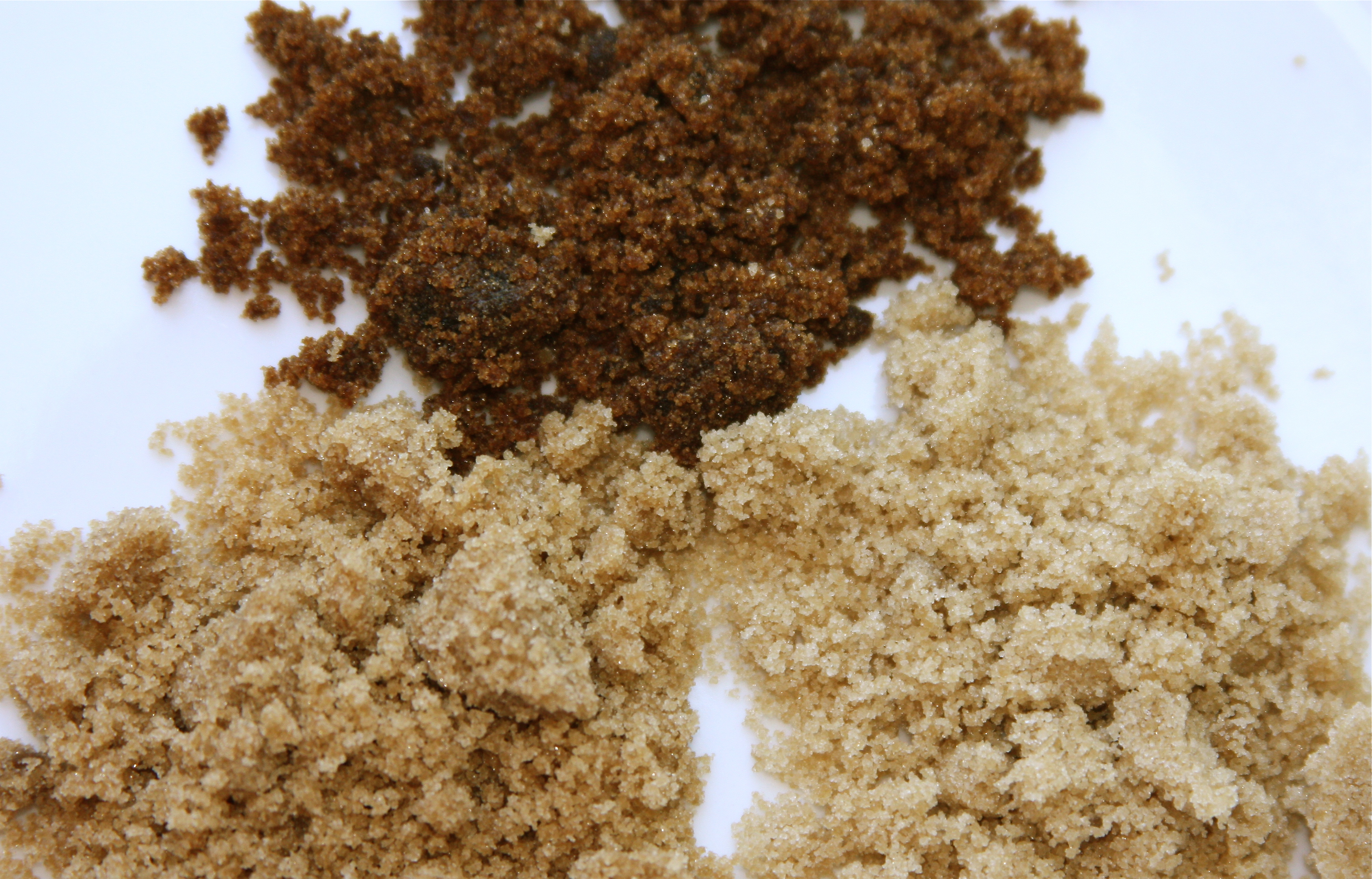
Muscovado brown sugarcane sugar

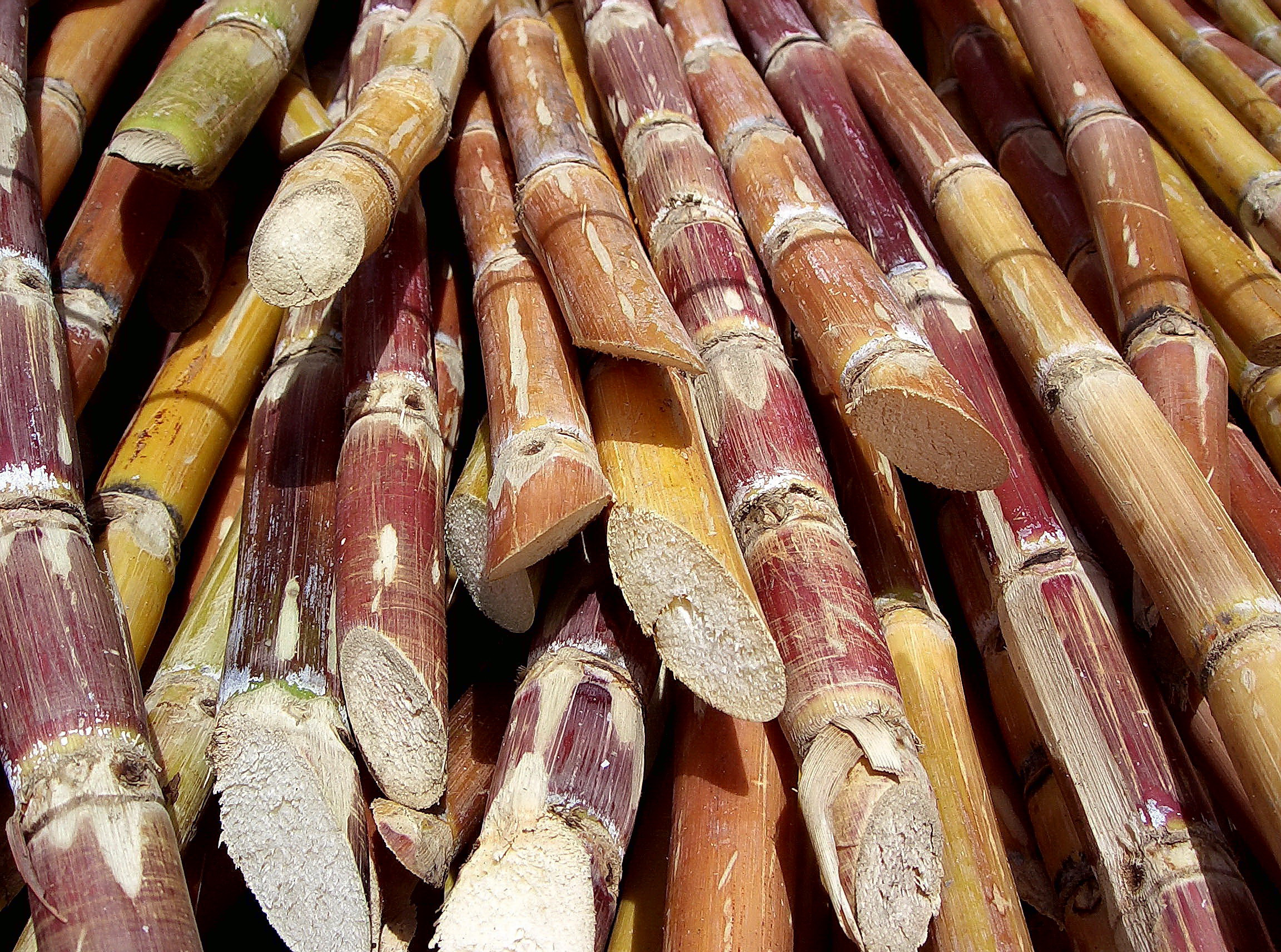
Cut sugarcane

Laua-an has an agricultural-based economy with rice, sugarcane and corn as primary crops. About 4,267,264 has. are devoted to agricultural crop production representing 22.83% of the total land area of the municipality. Laua-an produce Rice, Corn, Vegetables, Peanuts, Mango, Banana, Abaca and other crops. It has 42 Day Care Centers, 12 Complete Elementary Schools and 4 Secondary Schools. In Health services, it has 1 Rural Health Center, 8 Barangay Health Stations and 13 Health & Nutrition Posts. Laua-an has a total of 76.065 km. of Barangay roads; 2.160 km. of municipal roads; 2.450 km. of provincial roads and 11.125 km. of National Roads. A mini-hydro project is being constructed at Brguy. San Ramon by Sun West Water and Electric Company and at Sitio Sadsadan, Barangay Maybunga and Villa Siga Bugasong. Four cell sites (Globe, Sun and Smart) were installed at Barangay Poblacion, Bagongbayan and Liya-Liya rerspectively. It is observed that even upland barangays have signal which contributed to the improvement of information technology in the area.

Farming is the major occupation of the people and fishing is the secondary source of income. The deep sea waters of Sulu Sea is abundant with fish and marine life like sardines, tuna, squids, mackerel, crabs and other seafoods which is a source of living for most residents.

== Tourism ==
Among the tourist attractions are Mount Igmatongtong in barangay Capnayan, Maybunga Water falls in barangay Maybunga, and Estaka Hill in barangay Poblacion. Estaca Hill in the Poblacion provides a strategic place to view the barangay Poblacion, the Sulu Sea and its environs.

== Culture ==
The town celebrates its Pahinis Festival every January.

=== Festivals ===
Pre-Catholic pre-Spanish Indianized Srivijaya-era Pahinis Festival similar to Makar Sankranti, is celebrated annually to feature the muscovado sugar industry of the town, the technology of which dates back to the Spanish era. "Pahinis" means to clean and prepare the tools for sugarcane milling which corresponds to a celebration to thank God for a fine harvest of sugarcane.

The town celebrates its centennial foundation in January 2015. Weeklong celebration features Pahinis Festival Mardi Gras; LGU, professionals, senior citizens and barangay night; Bugal Kang Laua-an (Pride of Laua-an) Awards Night; and Search for Hara de Pahinis (Pahinis Queen) Beauty Pageant and Coronation Night. The winner of this pageant represents the municipality during the Search for Lin-ay kang Antique (Miss Antique) during the Binirayan Festival in the capital town of San Jose de Buenavista every last week of December. Other events include boat racing along the Sulu Sea, and Aring Beach Festival at the last night of the celebration in Barangay Cadajug.

== Education ==
The Laua-an Schools District Office governs all educational institutions within the municipality. It oversees the management and operations of all private and public, from primary to secondary schools.

=== Primary and elementary schools ===
- Alfredo Magluyan, Sr. Memorial School (Intao Primary School)
- Canituan Primary School
- Capnayan Primary School
- Casit-an Elementary School
- Guiamon Primary School
- Guinbanga-an Elementary School
- Guisijan Elementary School
- Jaguiquican Elementary School
- Kids of Zion's Academe
- Lactudan Primary School
- Latazon Primary School
- Laua-an Baptist Church Learning Center
- Laua-an Central School
- Leon Primary School
- Liberato Primary School
- Lindero-Cadajug Elementary School
- Lugta Elementary School
- Lupa-an Elementary School
- Maria Elementary School
- Maybunga Primary School
- Oloc Elementary School
- Omlot Primary School
- Pandanan Primary School
- Paningayan Primary School
- San Ramon Primary School
- Santiago Elementary School
- St. Isidore Parochial Kindergarten School
- Tibacan Pascuala Primary School
- Tigunhao Primary School
- Virginia Primary School

=== Secondary schools ===
- Col. Ruperto Abellon National High School
- Eastern Laua-an National High School (Maria National High School)
- Laua-an National High School
