= Mararison Island =

Island in Antique, Philippines

Mararison
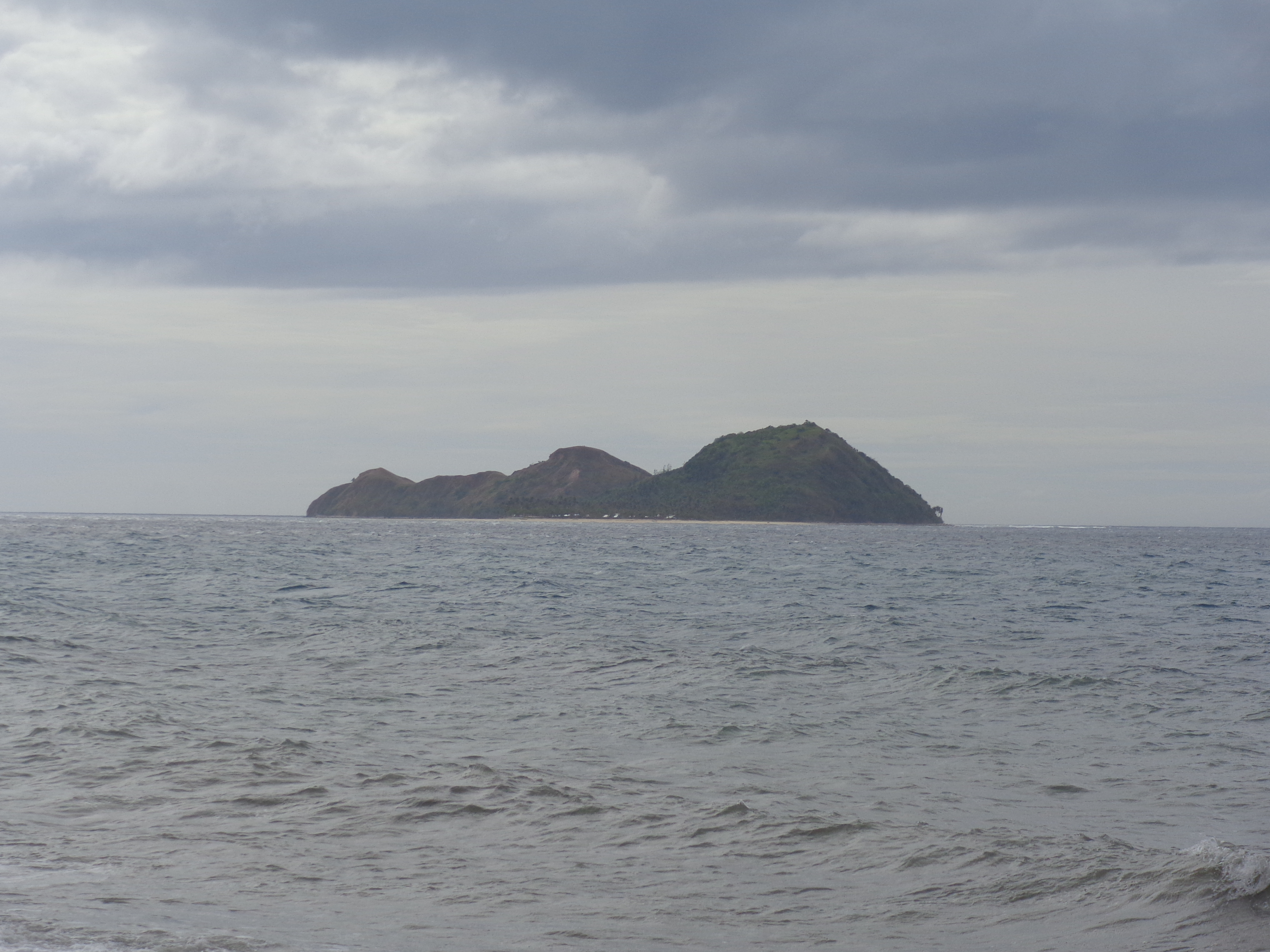
- Mararison Island, view from Culasi, Antique

- Location within Philippines

Geography
- Location: Culasi Channel
- Coordinates: 11°23′48″N 122°1′10″E
- Archipelago: Philippine Islands
- Area: 0.55 km^{2} (0.21 sq mi)
- Highest elevation: 272 ft (82.9 m)
- Highest point: Tuyong-tuyong Hill

Administration
- Philippines
- Region: Western Visayas
- Province: Antique
- Municipality: Culasi

Demographics
- Population: 789 (2020 census)
- Ethnic groups: Karay-a, Ati

Mararison, also known as Malalison, is a small island and a barangay in Culasi in the Antique Province, on the island of Panay in the Philippines.

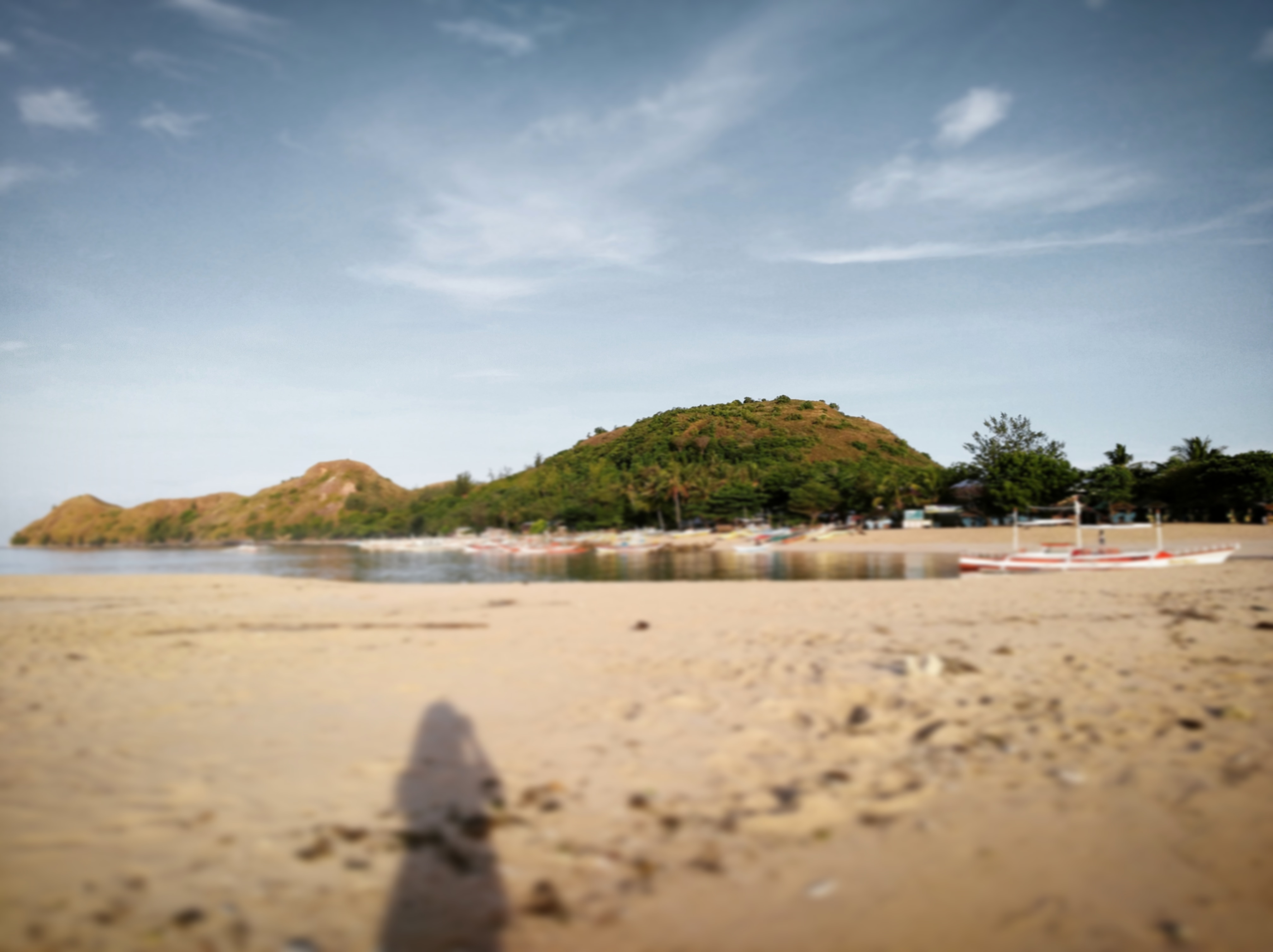
Mararison island sandbar.

== Geography ==
Mararison Island has a total land area of 0.55 km^{2} (0.21 sq mi). Tuyong-tuyong Hill is the island highest point with an elevation of 272 ft (83 m) above sea level. The island is 2.45 km distances from the coast of Culasi, and has a total coastline of 3.96 km. The uninhabited Nablag Island is 0.8 km to the west shore of Mararison, Nablag Island has a total land area of 1.46 hectares.

The island have reefs that contains more than one hundred species of hard corals. It also has white sand beaches similar to nearby Boracay.

== Tourism ==
The island became known as a potential tourist spot after the damage caused by Typhoon Haiyan in 2013. News reports covered not only the devastation caused by the typhoon but also the island's pristine environment. This helped increase the tourists entering the island and improved its local economy. In September 2019, the province of Antique declared the island as one of its five flagship tourist destinations.

== See also ==
- Panay
