= Belison =

Municipality in Antique, Philippines

- Municipality
- Municipality of Belison
- Belison Municipal Hall

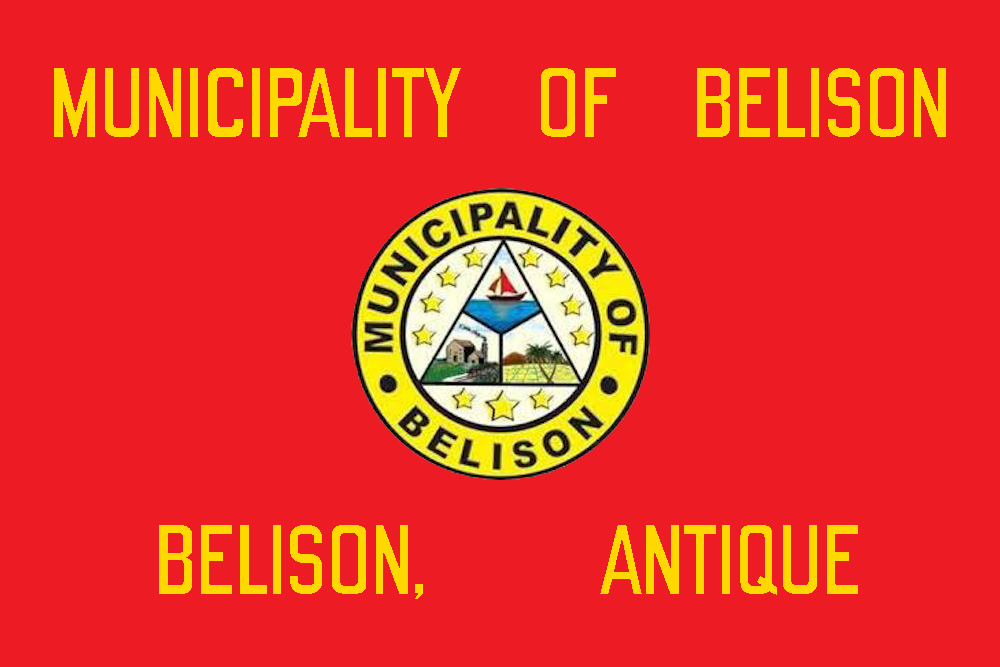
- Flag

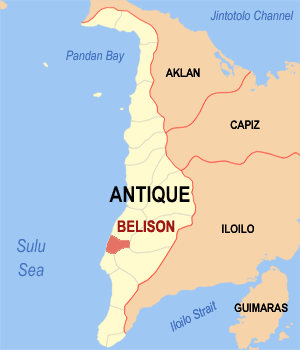
- Map of Antique with Belison highlighted
- Interactive map of Belison
- Location in the Philippines
- Coordinates: 10°50′17″N 121°57′38″E
- Country: Philippines
- Region: Western Visayas
- Province: Antique
- District: Lone district
- Founded: March 10, 1961
- Barangays: 11 (see Barangays)

Government
  - Type: Sangguniang Bayan
  - Mayor: Christopher H. Piccio
  - Vice Mayor: Darell B. dela Flor
  - Representative: Loren Legarda
  - Municipal Council: Members: Leoncio O. Abiera Sr.; Nonato O. Delima Sr.; Jerry M. Chavez; Josefa E. Barcenal; Rustico D. Arzaga; Wenceslao E. Quiman; Alma Mae T. Abao; Ronie D. Acuña
  - Electorate: 10,017 voters (2025)

Area
  - Total: 19.78 km^{2} (7.64 sq mi)
- Highest elevation (Mount Igtangitang): 237 m (778 ft)
- Lowest elevation: 0 m (0 ft)

Population (2024 census)
  - Total: 14,433
  - Density: 729.7/km^{2} (1,890/sq mi)
  - Households: 3,412
- Demonym: Bilisongnun

Economy
  - Income class: 5th municipal income class
  - Poverty incidence: 11.08% (2023)
  - Revenue: ₱ 98.25 million (2024)
  - Assets: ₱ 341.9 million (2024)
  - Expenditure: ₱ 50.99 million (2024)
  - Liabilities: ₱ 127.3 million (2024)

Service provider
  - Electricity: Antique Electric Cooperative (ANTECO)
- Time zone: UTC+8 (PST)
- ZIP code: 5701
- PSGC: 060603000
- IDD : area code: +63 (0)36
- Native languages: Karay-a; Hiligaynon; Tagalog
- Website: belisonantique.gov.ph

Belison (/bɛˈlison/), officially the Municipality of Belison (Kinaray-a: Banwa kang Bilisong, [bɪˈlisʊŋ]; Hiligaynon: Banwa sang Belison; Tagalog: Bayan ng Belison), is a municipality in the province of Antique, Philippines. According to the 2024 census, it has a population of 14,433 people.

Belison is the smallest (in area and population) and the youngest municipality in the province of Antique.

== History ==
Belison (Kinaray-a: Bilisong) was merely a barangay in the larger municipality of Patnongon, adjacent to the north. Belison barangay leaders and Manila-based Bilisongnuns ([bɪlɪsʊŋˈnən]; ‘Belison residents’) mapped out a petition requesting the national government to make Belison an independent town. The petition was brought to Malacañan Palace on March 10, 1961, and through Presidential Executive Order No. 421 signed by President Carlos P. Garcia, Belison was declared a municipality - the smallest and the youngest in the Province of Antique.

During World War II, Japanese submarines and other naval vessels used the shores of Belison as accessible entry points to Panay, facilitating the invasion of Western Visayas. Local accounts recall both the fear brought by these forces and the resistance mounted by inhabitants, who established guerrilla strongholds in the mountainous areas surrounding the municipality.

When the Japanese air raids would bomb Belison and the nearby communities, families from all around fled to Guinobatan Cave, high in the hills of barangay Buenavista. And when the American forces came, they too used the smooth sea landing in Belison, bringing relief food supplies to Bilisongnuns, and troops to attack the Japanese occupying forces. They often used local homes in the area to hide in while planning their strategies for assault against the enemy, and enlisted the help of brave men and women to carry out their plans.

== Geography ==
Belison is 15 kilometres (9.3 mi) from the provincial capital, San Jose de Buenavista.

According to the Philippine Statistics Authority, the municipality has a land area of 19.78 square kilometres (7.64 sq mi) constituting 0.72% of the 2,729.17-square-kilometre- (1,053.74 sq mi) total area of Antique.

The municipality is bounded on the east by San Remigio, southeast by Sibalom, south by San Jose de Buenavista, north by Patnongon, and west by the Cuyo East Pass.

=== Climate ===
Climate data for Belison, Antique
Month	Jan	Feb	Mar	Apr	May	Jun	Jul	Aug	Sep	Oct	Nov	Dec	Year
Mean daily maximum °C (°F)	30 (86)	31 (88)	32 (90)	33 (91)	32 (90)	30 (86)	29 (84)	29 (84)	29 (84)	29 (84)	30 (86)	30 (86)	30 (87)
Mean daily minimum °C (°F)	22 (72)	22 (72)	22 (72)	24 (75)	25 (77)	25 (77)	25 (77)	25 (77)	25 (77)	24 (75)	23 (73)	23 (73)	24 (75)
Average precipitation mm (inches)	48 (1.9)	41 (1.6)	58 (2.3)	82 (3.2)	223 (8.8)	300 (11.8)	346 (13.6)	307 (12.1)	311 (12.2)	292 (11.5)	167 (6.6)	81 (3.2)	2,256 (88.8)
Average rainy days	11.4	7.7	11.3	15.4	25.7	28.5	29.5	28.7	28.3	28.7	21.8	15.2	252.2
Source: Meteoblue (Use with caution: this is modeled/calculated data, not measured locally.)

=== Barangays ===
Belison is politically subdivided into 11 barangays. Each barangay consists of puroks and some have sitios.

The Poblacion, seat of the municipal government, is an urban barangay while the rest are considered rural.

PSGC	Barangay	Population			±% p.a.	
		2024		2010		
060603001	Borocboroc	8.7%	1,261	1,173	▴	0.50%
060603002	Buenavista	3.5%	504	449	▴	0.81%
060603003	Concepcion	8.8%	1,263	1,165	▴	0.56%
060603004	Delima	5.5%	790	751	▴	0.35%
060603005	Ipil	5.2%	744	689	▴	0.54%
060603006	Maradiona	11.2%	1,613	1,539	▴	0.33%
060603007	Mojon	3.2%	461	410	▴	0.82%
060603008	Poblacion	31.2%	4,503	4,479	▴	0.04%
060603009	Rombang	7.0%	1,016	834	▴	1.38%
060603010	Salvacion	3.4%	497	464	▴	0.48%
060603011	Sinaja	6.1%	887	854	▴	0.26%
	Total		14,433	12,807	▴	0.83%

== Demographics ==
Population census of Belison
Year	Pop.	±% p.a.
1970	7,189	—
1975	7,627	+1.19%
1980	8,626	+2.49%
1990	10,095	+1.59%
1995	11,174	+1.92%
2000	11,621	+0.84%
2007	12,467	+0.97%
2010	12,807	+0.98%
2015	13,539	+1.06%
2020	14,129	+0.90%
2024	14,433	+0.51%
Source: Philippine Statistics Authority

In the 2024 census, Belison had a population of 14,433 people. The population density was 730 inhabitants per square kilometre (1,900/sq mi).

=== Language ===
Kinaray-a is the dominant dialect of Belison while Hiligaynon is also spoken and understood by the residents.

=== Religion ===
Nine (9) of the leading Christian religious dominations in the Philippines established their presence in the town. Most Bilisongnuns are of Aglipayan ancestry.

- Aglipayan or the members of the Iglesia Filipina Independiente (Parish of Our Lady of Purity & Candles) have a church along Delima Street.
- Roman Catholics, there is the Lady of Candles Parish located along Oliverio Street.
- Seventh-day Adventist Church located along Placer Street.
- Iglesia ni Cristo has two locales, one in Candelaria Street, Poblacion and another in National Road, Barangay Rombang.
- Assembly of God located along Candelaria Street.
- Belison Baptist Church located along Rizal Street.
- Born Again Church located in Barangay Maradiona.
- United Pentecostal Church is located along National Road (Barangay Poblacion).
- Victory Christian Church is located along Bajalan-Lancara Street.

== Economy ==
Poverty incidence of Belison (%)

Source: Philippine Statistics Authority

Agriculture is the main economic activity of the town. More than half of its land is riceland, while the rest are planted to corn, coconut, sugar cane and other production like vegetables and peanuts.

== Government ==
=== Municipal seal ===
The Belison municipal seal was created to commemorate the agricultural heritage of the town, in order to preserve the legacy of the original settlers in the region. It depicts three mainstay agricultural activities:

- The top image represents fishing and the bounties of the neighboring sea.
- The lower left portion is the harvesting of sugar cane, its processing muscovado sugar.
- The lower right depicts tilling of the lowlands for the planting of rice and other grains and vegetables.

Surrounding the great triangle are eleven stars – one representing each barangay in the town. The largest star at the bottom is for the Poblacion. Their strength lies in their connectivity to one another, and in their closeness to the traditions of the past.

== Education ==
The Belison Schools District Office governs all educational institutions within the municipality. It oversees the management and operations of all private and public, from primary to secondary schools.

=== Primary and elementary schools ===
- Belison Catholic Preschool Center
- Belison Central School
- Belison Christian Center
- Belison Little Angels Study Center
- Belison Precious Minds Learning Center
- Borocboroc-Delima-Ipil Elementary School
- Buenavista Elementary School
- Concepcion Elementary School
- Kaputli kag Kapawa Learning Center
- Maradiona Elementary School
- Mojon Elementary School
- Rombang Elementary School
- Sinaja-Salvacion Elementary School

=== Secondary school ===
- Belison National School
