= Antique (province) =

- Province
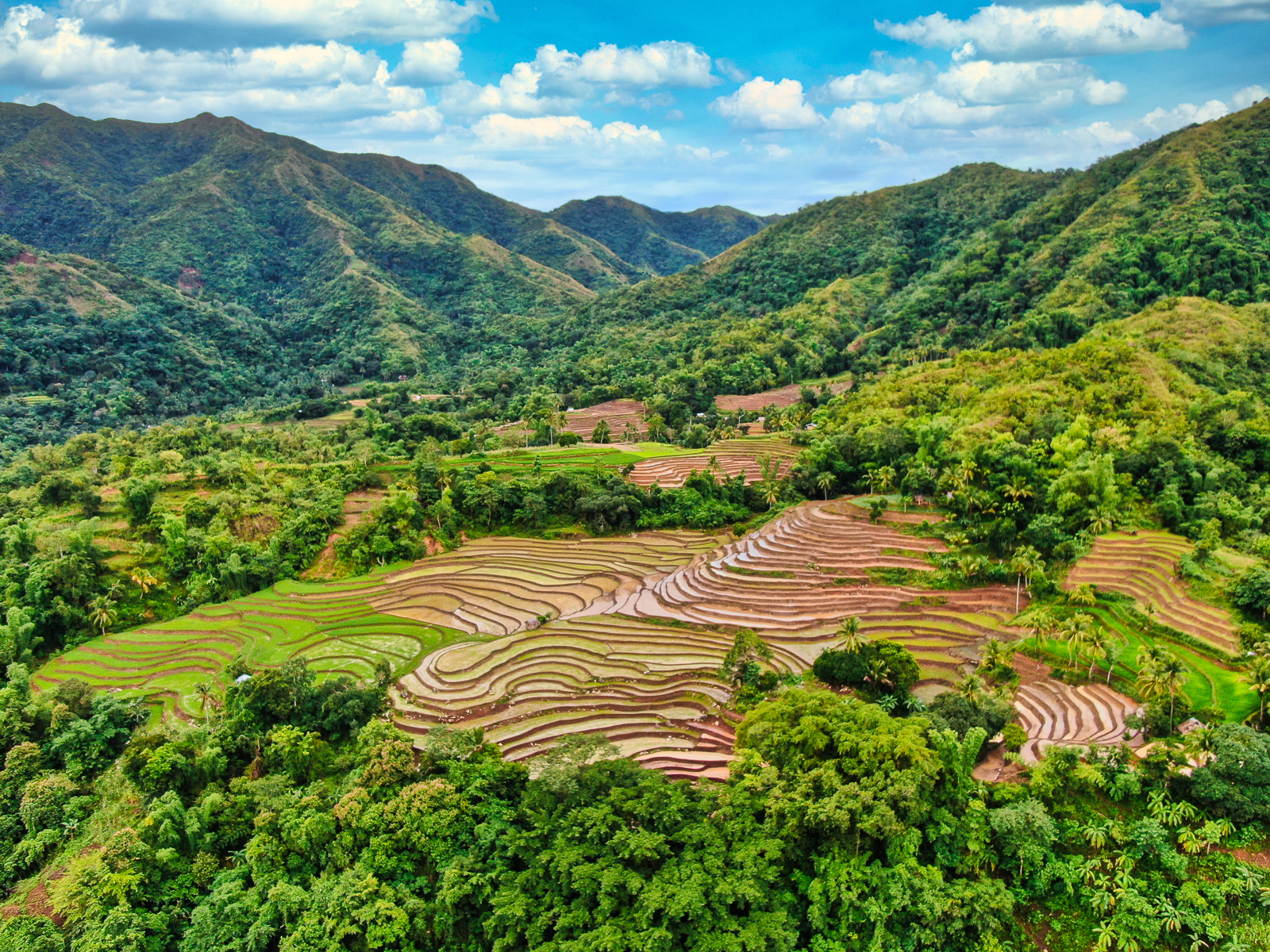
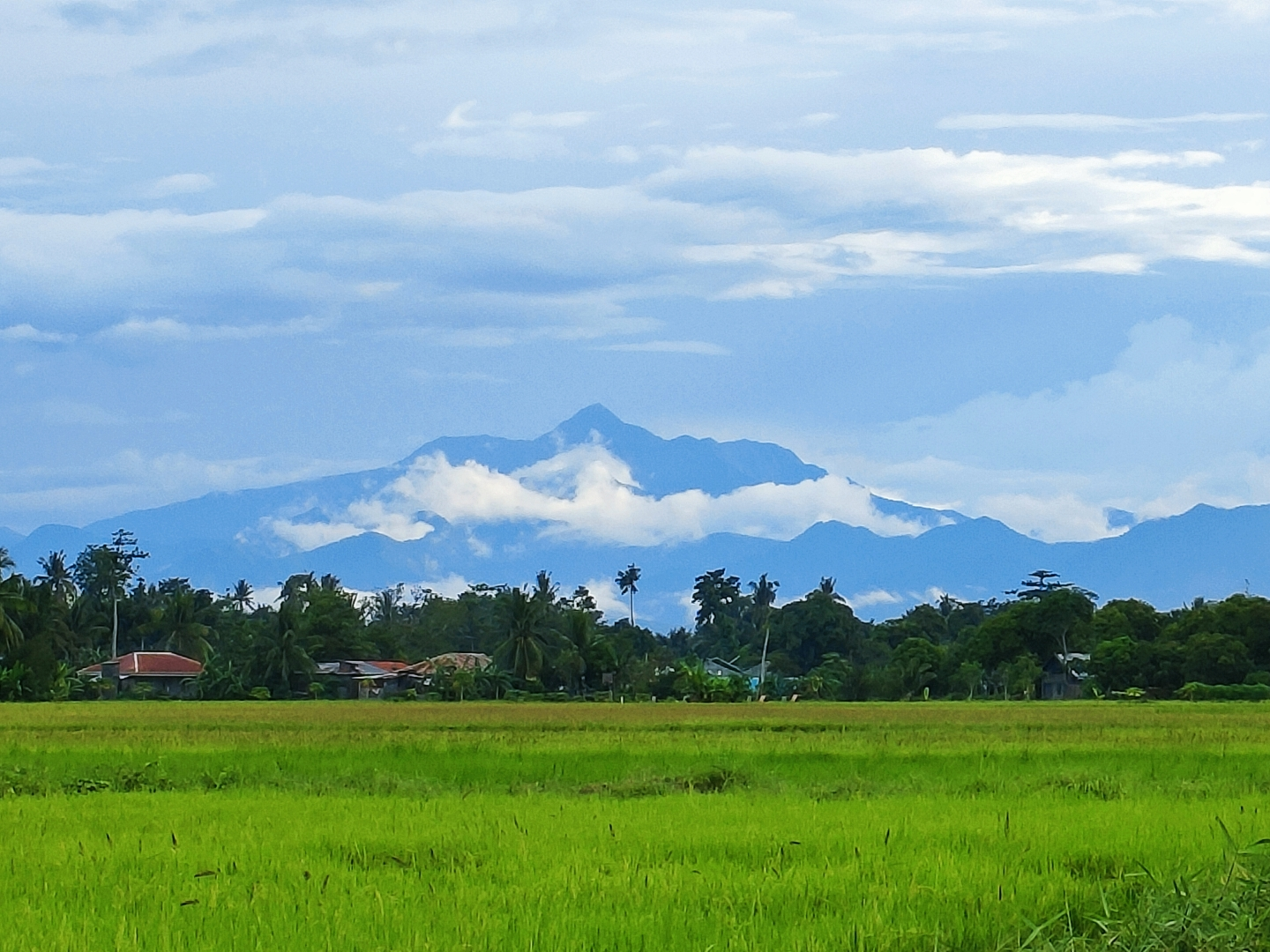
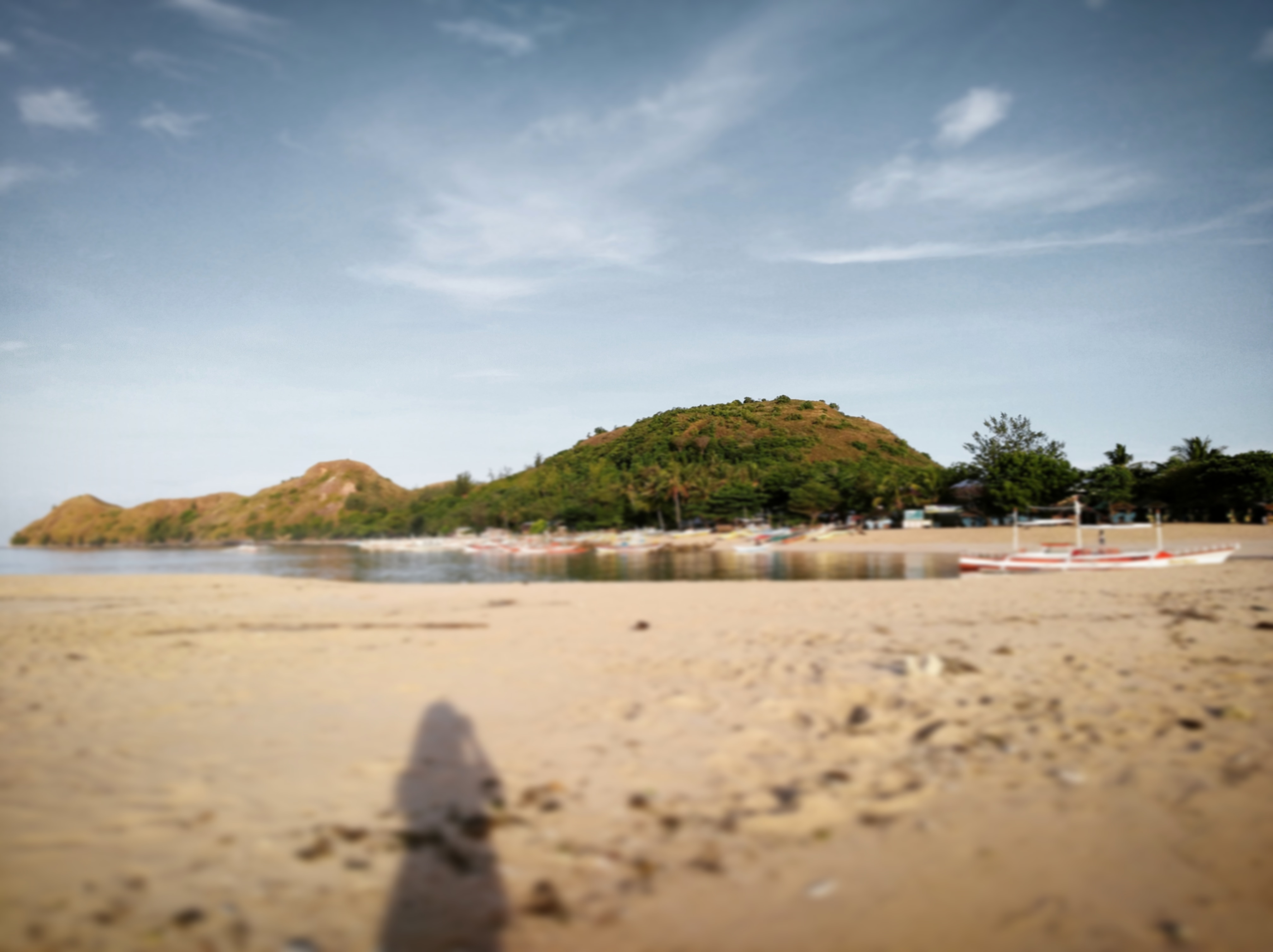
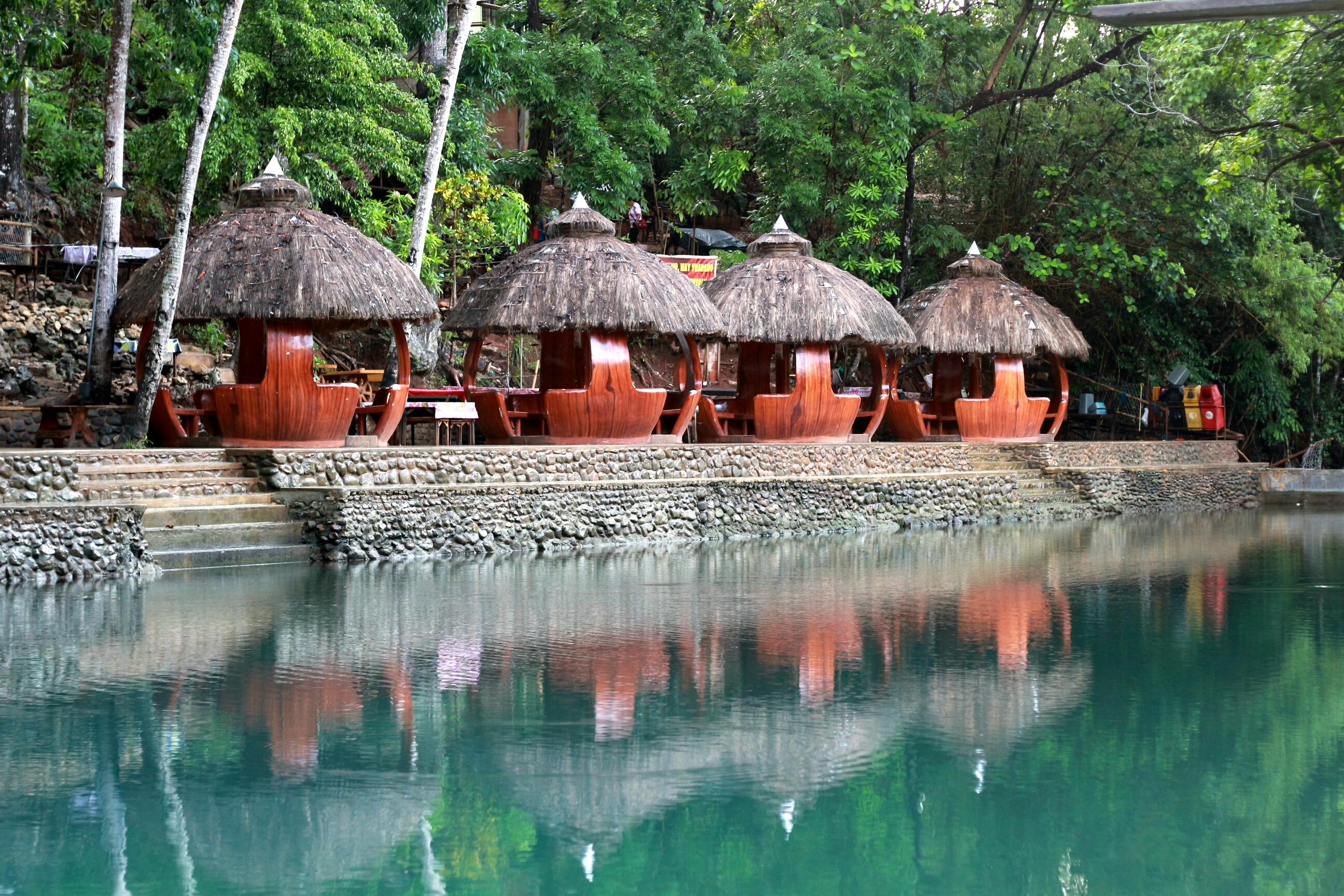
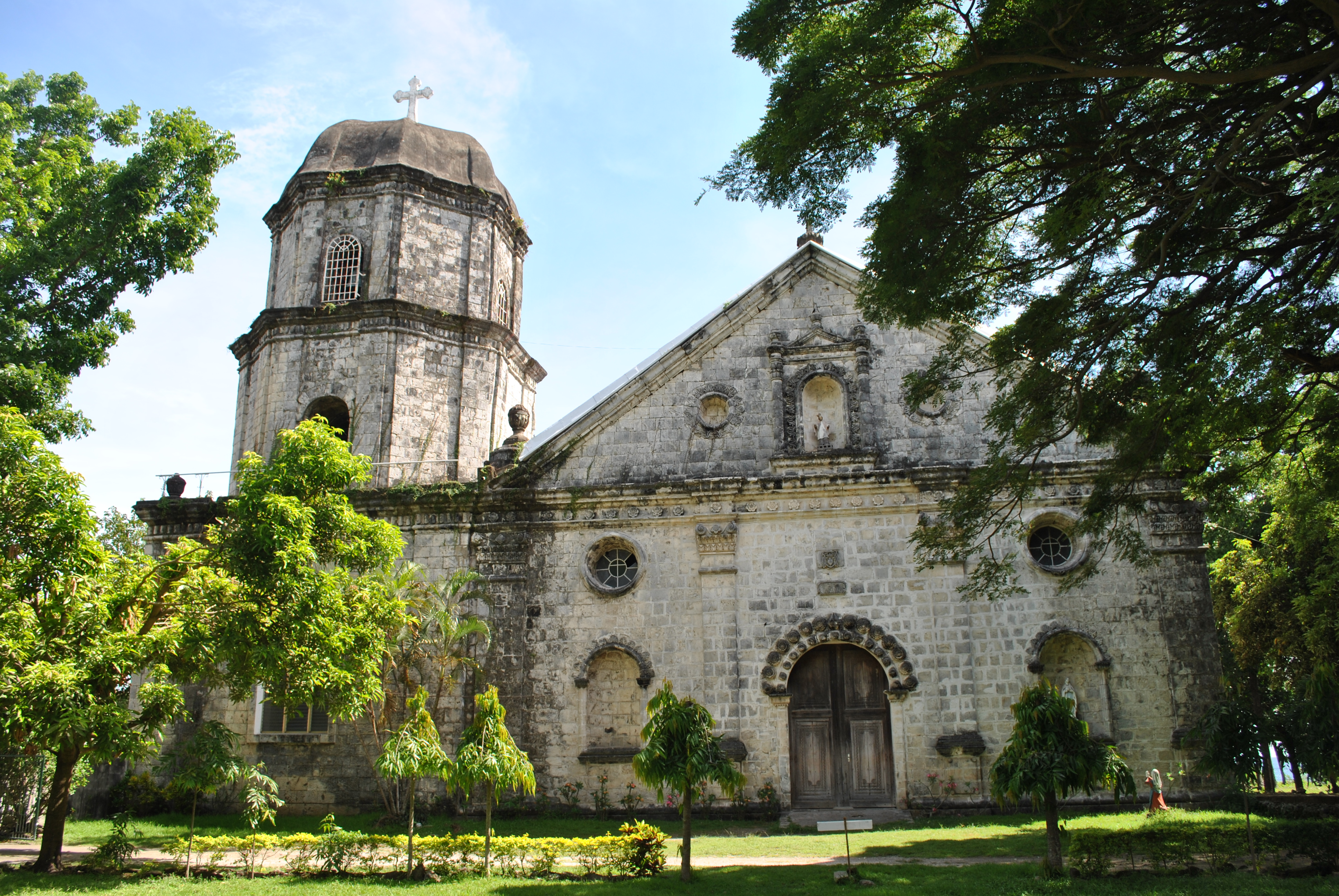
- (from top: left to right) Tibiao Rice Terraces, Mount Madja-as, Mararison Island, Malumpati Cold Spring, and Anini-y Church.

- Flag Seal
- Nickname: The Land Where The Mountains Meet The Sea
- Location in the Philippines
- Interactive map of Antique
- Coordinates: 11°10′00″N 122°05′00″E
- Country: Philippines
- Region: Western Visayas
- Malayan Settlement: 13th Century (as Hamtik)
- Spanish Settlement: 1569 (Hantíque, later on became Antíque)
- Politico-Military Province: 1790
- Founded: March 10, 1917
- Capital and largest municipality: San Jose de Buenavista

Government
  - Type: Sangguniang Panlalawigan
  - Governor: Paolo Everardo S. Javier (Aksyon)
  - Vice Governor: Genevive L. Reyes (NUP)
  - Representative: Antonio Legarda Jr.
  - Legislature: Antique Provincial Board
  - Electorate: 399,553 voters (2025)

Area
  - Total: 2,729.17 km^{2} (1,053.74 sq mi)
  - Rank: 49th out of 82
- Highest elevation (Mount Madja-as): 2,117 m (6,946 ft)

Population (2024 census)
  - Total: 643,173
  - Rank: 52nd out of 82
  - Density: 235.666/km^{2} (610.373/sq mi)
  - Rank: 44th out of 82
  - Households: 147,696
- Demonym: Antiqueño

Divisions
  - Independent cities: 0
  - Component cities: 0
  - Municipalities: 18: Anini-y; Barbaza; Belison; Bugasong; Caluya; Culasi; Hamtic; Laua-an; Libertad; Pandan; Patnongon; San Jose de Buenavista; San Remigio; Sebaste; Sibalom; Tibiao; Tobias Fornier; Valderrama
  - Barangays: 590
  - Districts: Legislative district of Antique

Economy
  - Income class: 1st provincial income class
  - Poverty incidence: 13.8% (2023)
  - Revenue: ₱ 3,142 million (2024)
  - Assets: ₱ 11,936 million (2024)
  - Expenditure: ₱ 2,549 million (2024)
  - Liabilities: ₱ 3,395 million (2024)
  - HDI: ▲0.640 (Medium)
  - HDI rank: 35th in Philippines (2019)
  - GDP: ₱70.69 billion $1.205 billion
- Time zone: UTC+8 (PHT)
- PSGC: 060600000
- IDD : area code: +63 (0)36
- ISO 3166 code: PH-ANT
- Spoken languages: Kinaray-a; Caluyanon; Hiligaynon; Cuyonon; Ati; Aklanon; Tagalog; English
- Website: antique.gov.ph

Antique ([ɐnˈtike]), officially the Province of Antique, (Note: Kinaray-a: Kapuoran kang Antique; Hiligaynon: Kapuoran sang Antique; Tagalog: Lalawigan ng Antique) is a province in the Philippines located in the Western Visayas region. Its capital and most populous town is San Jose de Buenavista. The province is situated in the western section of Panay Island and borders Aklan, Capiz, and Iloilo to the east, while facing the Sulu Sea to the west.

The province is home to the indigenous Iraynun-Bukidnon, speakers of a dialect of the Kinaray-a language, who have crafted the only rice terrace clusters in the Visayas through indigenous knowledge and sheer vernacular capabilities. The rice terraces of the Iraynun-Bukidnon are divided into four terraced fields, namely, General Fullon rice terraces, Lublub rice terraces, Bakiang rice terraces, and San Agustin rice terraces. All of the rice terrace clusters have been researched by the National Commission for Culture and the Arts and various scholars from the University of the Philippines. There have been campaigns to nominate the Iraynun-Bukidnon Rice Terraces, along with the Central Panay Mountain Range, into the UNESCO World Heritage List.

== Etymology ==
Antique was one of the three sakups (districts) of Panay before Spanish colonizers arrived on the islands. The province was known at that time as Hantík, the local name for the large black ants found on the island. The Spanish chroniclers, influenced by the French, recorded the region's name as Hantique (with the silent 'h'), but this was only adopted in areas near Malandog River in present Hamtic town which then became the provincial capital (shortly before Bugason and San Jose). The province bearing its former capital's name is spelled and pronounced as "Antique" (än-ti-ké), without 'h' and pronounced in (Kinaray-a) dialectic way.

== History ==
=== Early history ===
Historians believe that the earliest people who settled on the island of Panay were tribal Negritos or Atis. Oral history, relayed as the "Maragtas", states that ten "datus" or minor tribal Malay chieftains escaped persecution from a city called Odtojan from Borneo due to a tyrant ruler called Makatunaw. The ten datus, led by Datu Puti, sailed northward with their families and communities, landing on Panay after departing Borneo. The authenticity of this narrative is disputed but nonetheless continues to be a part of the local history of the people of Antique.

According to the Maragtas, the Bornean datus upon arrival met with the Ati chieftain Datu Marikudo and his wife Maniwantiwan. They offered the chieftain a salakot (wide-brimmed hat) (believed to be of pure gold by present-day locals) as well as a golden necklace, earrings, bracelets and trinkets they wore when they fled Borneo. The gifts also include pearls and fine clothes as a show of respect to the indigenous people. Datu Marikudo responded to the datus' generosity by giving them the lowlands and moving to the mountains with his Ati tribe as the mountains are sacred to them. The legendary arrival of Bornean boats at the shores of Antique is commemorated annually in the Binirayan festival.

The island of Panay was then divided into three sakups: Hantik, Akean and Irong-Irong. Irong-Irong became Iloilo, Akean became the present-day Aklan and Capiz, and Hantik (also called Hamtik or Hamtic) became Antique. Hantik was named for the large black ants found on the island called "hantik-hantik".

=== Spanish colonial era ===
During the Spanish colonial period, the coastal province was vulnerable to attacks by Moro raiders. Under the direction of the Spanish friars, a series of watchtowers, like the 'Old Watchtower' in Libertad and Estaca Hill in Bugasong, were built to guard Antique.

In 1790, Antique was converted into a politico-military province with the town of Antique (now Hamtic) as its first capital. The provincial seat of government was later transferred to Bugasón (old name of Bugasong), and finally to San Jose de Buenavista. By the 1700s, Antique had 9,228 families. However, during the 1800s, Antique grew to be a wealthy and a thickly populated international port town, with the number of families paying tribute ballooning to 23,261 in number, and enhanced by the presence of 50 Spanish Filipino tributes-families, and about 40 Chinese Filipino tributes-families. Specifically, the Spanish-Filipino families are numbered thus, together with their residences: 7 (Dao), 12 (Antique), 19 (San Antonio de Nalupa), 1 (Bugason), 3 (Patnongon), 2 (Sibalom) and 6 (San Jose de Buenavista). These peoples, having remitted a large sum of 153,420 Silver Peso Coins to the Treasury during year 1818.

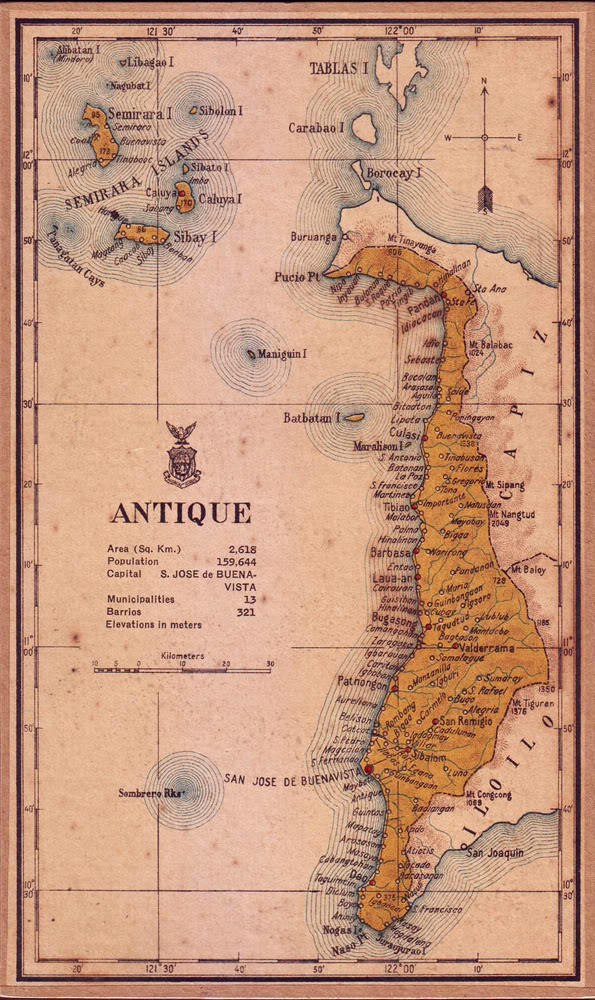
Administrative Map of Antique in 1918

=== Japanese occupation ===
In 1942, the Imperial Japanese Army landed in Antique and occupied the province during the Second World War.

During the Japanese Insurgencies and Occupation (1942–1944), the military general headquarters and camp bases of the 6th and 62nd Infantry Division of the Philippine Commonwealth Army was active from January 3, 1942, to June 30, 1946, and the military general headquarters and camp bases of the 6th Constabulary Regiment of the Philippine Constabulary was re-activated between October 28, 1944, and June 30, 1946. Additionally, during the implementation of the anti-imperial Japanese military operations on Panay Island between 1942 and 1945 in the Antique province, Filipino military forces aided the local guerrilla resistance against the Imperial Japanese Army.

Between 1944 and 1945, Philippine Commonwealth forces of the 6th Constabulary Regiment of the Philippine Constabulary and the 6th and 62nd Infantry Division of the Philippine Commonwealth Army defeated the Japanese troops and liberated the province. The liberation was achieved with the active support of recognized local guerrillas.

=== Republic era ===
==== Martial law era ====
The beginning months of the 1970s had marked a period of turmoil and change in the Philippines, as well as in Antique. During his bid to be the first Philippine president to be re-elected for a second term, Ferdinand Marcos launched an unprecedented number of foreign debt-funded public works projects. This caused the Philippine economy to take a sudden downwards turn known as the 1969 Philippine balance of payments crisis, which led to a period of economic difficulty and a significant rise of social unrest. With only a year left in his last constitutionally allowed term as president, Ferdinand Marcos placed the Philippines under Martial Law in September 1972 and thus retained the position for fourteen more years. This period in Philippine history is remembered for the Marcos administration's record of human rights abuses, particularly targeting political opponents, student activists, journalists, religious workers, farmers, and others who fought against the Marcos dictatorship.

One of the significant events of the Philippines's Martial Law era was the Bacong Bridge Massacre, which took place in the town of Culasi, Antique on December 19, 1981. Sometimes also known as the Culasi incident, it involved the Philippine Constabulary killing 5 protester-farmers at the Bacong River bridge in Culasi's Barangay Malacañang. The victims were identified as Leopoldo A. Anos, Aquilino M. Castillo, Fortunato M. Dalisay, Remegildo P. Dalisay, and Joel B. Plaquino, and were later honored at the Philippines' Bantayog ng mga Bayani, which recognizes the heroes and martyrs who fought the authoritarian regime.

=== Contemporary ===
In 2014, the first ever Philippine rice terraces found outside the Cordilleras was discovered in Antique through satellite and a team of scientists and locals. The heritage site, known as the Antique Rice Terraces of the Panay-Bukidnon people, is believed to be at least 200 years old. In 2017, the province hosted the Palarong Pambansa for the very first time.

== Geography ==
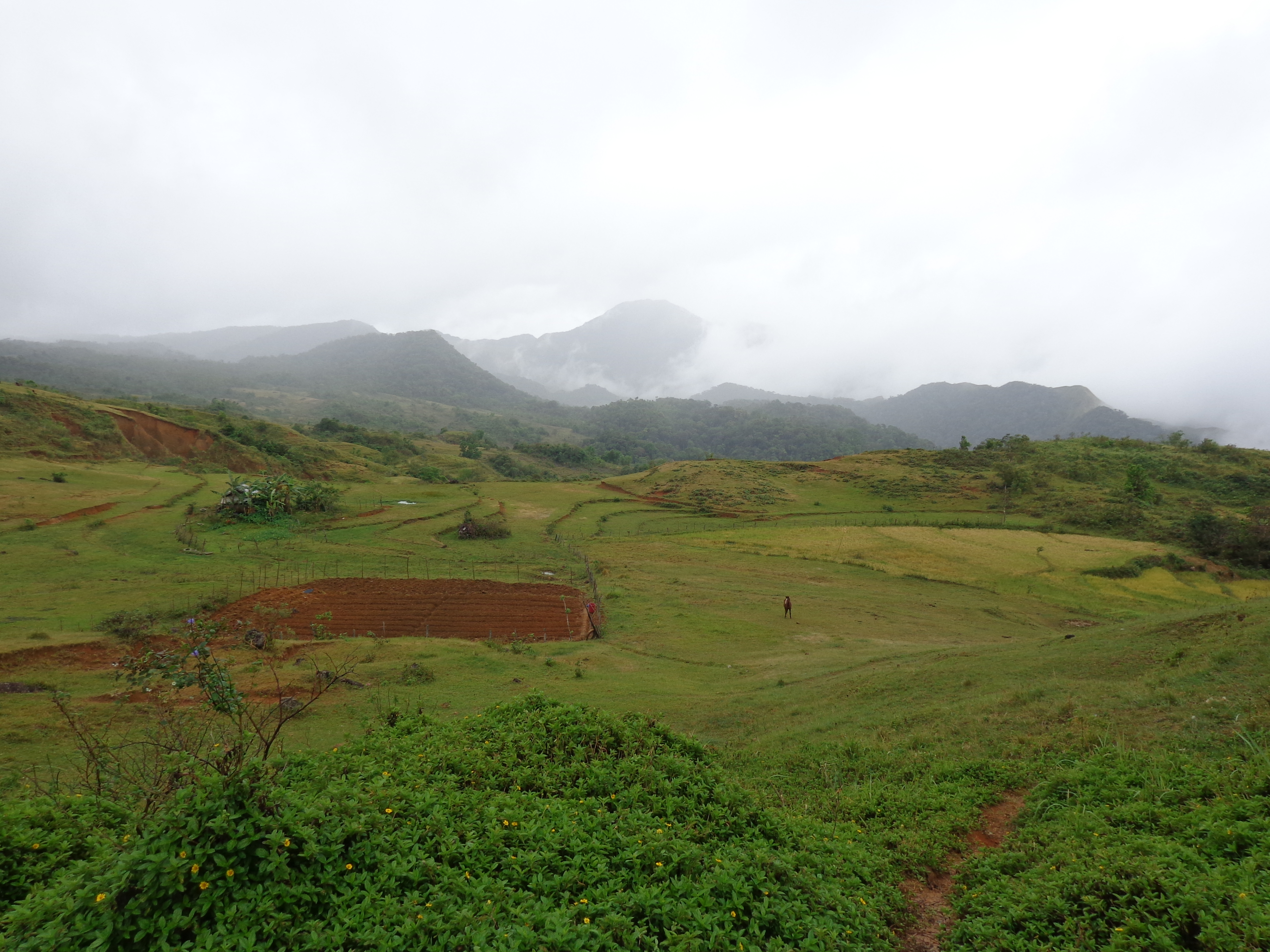
Landscape in San Remigio

Antique is one of the six provinces comprising Western Visayas or Region VI, and one of the four provinces on the island of Panay.

The province, with a total land area of 2,729.17 square kilometres (1,053.74 sq mi), is an elongated stretch of land occupying the entire western side of the island. It is bounded by the rugged central mountains of Panay, bordering on the provinces of Aklan in the northeast, Capiz on the east, Iloilo in the southeast and the Sulu Sea on the west. Its westernmost and northernmost point is Semirara Island at 12°07′10″N 121°21′10″E, while its eastern tip is approximately 11°01′N 122°19.5′E. Anini-y is the province's most southerly point at 10°24′24″N 121°57′38″E. Resembling a seahorse in shape, it is 155 kilometres (96 mi) long and 35 kilometres (22 mi) at its widest point.

=== Physical Features ===
Antique has rugged and varied land. Nogas Island, Hurao-Hurao Island and Mararison Island have long stretches of white sand beaches that are ideal for shell-hunting. Batbatan Island on the other hand, appeals to scuba divers because of the well-preserved coral reefs.

Mount Madja-as is located in Culasi, is the highest peak on the island of Panay. This 2,117-metre-high (6,946 ft) mountain is a dormant volcano with lakes and 14 waterfalls. It is said to be the legendary home of Bulalakaw, the supreme god of the ancients, and beckons as a challenge for hikers and trekkers. Mount Nangtud, is the second highest mountain in Antique and Panay island with an elevation of 6,804 ft (2,074 m) above sea level, located between Antique and Capiz border.

Antique has nine major rivers, the longest is Sibalom River 73 km, followed by Paliwan River 58.2 km, Cangaranan River 57.4 km, Dalanas River 34.6 km, Cairawan River 31.5 km, Ypayo River (Patnongon) 29.2 km, Tibiao River 26.4 km, Malandog River 17.8 km and Bacong River 16.2 km.

List of peaks in Antique by elevation.

- Mount Madja-as 6,946 ft (2,117 m)
- Mount Nangtud 6,804 ft (2,074 m)
- Mount Baloy 6,430 ft (1,960 m)
- Mount Balabag 5,630 ft (1,720 m)
- Mount Agbalanti 5,180 ft (1,580 m)
- Mount Kigas 4,967 ft (1,514 m)
- Mount Igbanig 4,810 ft (1,470 m)
- Mount Sipanag 4,754 ft (1,449 m)
- Mount Igdalig 4,518 ft (1,377 m)
- Mount Tiguran 4,518 ft (1,377 m)
- Mount Tigatay 4,429 ft (1,350 m)
- Mount Dumara 4,222 ft (1,287 m)
- Mount Sansanan 4,209 ft (1,283 m)
- Mount Anoy 3,507 ft (1,069 m)
- Mount Balabag, Seb. 3,360 ft (1,020 m)
- Mount Acotay 3,241 ft (988 m)
- Mount Tinayunga 3,002 ft (915 m)
- Mount Tuno 2,841 ft (866 m)
- Mount Tigancal 2,825 ft (861 m)
- Mount Tigbararing 2,582 ft (787 m)
- Mount Tigdagano 2,513 ft (766 m)
- Mount Manlagbo 2,421 ft (738 m)
- Mount Aningalan 2,470 ft (750 m)

=== River systems ===
List of rivers in Antique by length.

- 1.Sibalom River 73 km
  - Tipulu-an River 33.1 km
    - Mao-it River 15.8 km
  - Maninila River 31.1 km
  - Cansilayan River 12.5 km
- 2.Paliwan River 58.2 km
  - Paningayan River 18.7 km
  - Bucayan River 14.1 km
  - Nawili River 12.6 km
- 3.Cangaranan River 57.4 km
  - Cadi-an River 25 km
    - Baloy River 15.4 km
- 4.Dalanas River, Barbaza 34.6 km
  - Mali-ao River 26.3 km
  - Kigas River 16.2 km
  - Mamara River 11.3 km
  - Bajay River 10 km
  - Memero River 6.2 km
  - Nalusdan River 5.8 km
- 5.Cairawan River, Laua-an 31.5 km
  - Cabay-ang River 19.5 km
- 6.Ypayo River, Patnongon 29.2 km
- 7.Tibiao River, Tibiao 26.4 km
- 8.Malandog River, Hamtic 17.8 km
- 9.Bacong River, Culasi 16.2 km
- 10.Hamtic River, Hamtic 15.2 km
- 11.Carit-an River, Patnongon 15.1 km
- 12.Casay River, Anini-y 14.3 km
- 13.Asluman River, Hamtic 13.8 km
- 14.Ipil River, Belison 13.4 km
- 15.Iba River, Anini-y 13.1 km
- 16.Bulanao River, Libertad 12.3 km
- 17.Bacalan River, Sebaste 11.5 km
- 18.Inyawan River, Libertad 11.4 km
- 19.Sabang River, Bugasong 11.4 km
- 20.Panganta River, Culasi 10.6 km
- 21.Paningayan River, Culasi 10.4 km
- 22.Binangbang River, Barbaza 10.4 km
- 23.Bugang River, Pandan 10.3 km
- 24.Patnongon River, Patnongon 10.2 km
- 25.San Roque River, Libertad 10.1 km
- 26.Carit-an River, Sebaste 8.7 km
- 27.Dao River, Tobias Fornier 8.6 km
- 28.Ypayo River, Sebaste 8.2 km
- 29.Linaban River, Hamtic 8.2 km
- 30.Panukayan River, Pandan 8.2 km
- 31.Nauring River, Pandan 7.8 km
- 32.Cala-cala River, Sebaste 7.7 km
- 33.Bongol River, Culasi 7.6 km
- 34.Duyong River, Pandan 7.6 km
- 35.Aureliana River, Patnongon 7.5 km
- 36.Idio River, Sebaste 7.5 km
- 37.Burabod River, Pandan 7.3 km
- 38.Union River, Libertad 7.2 km
- 39.Carit-an River, Culasi 7.1 km
- 40.Patria River, Pandan 6.1 km
- 41.Guija River, Bugasong 5.9 km
- 42.Aguila River, Sebaste 5.5 km
- 43.Bitadnon River, Culasi 5.4 km
- 44.Aras-asan River, Hamtic 5.4 km
- 45.Igbarawan River, Patnongon 5.2 km
- 46.Nalupa River, Barbaza 5.1 km
- 47.San Andres River, Pandan 5.1 km
- 48.Paz River, Libertad 4.9 km
- 49.Barusbus River, Libertad 4.9 km
- 50.Laua-an River, Laua-an 4.6 km
- 51.Mapatag River, Hamtic 4.6 km
- 52.Nauhon River, Sebaste 4.2 km
- 53.Mauno River, Laua-an 3.8 km
- 54.Banban River, Laua-an 2.4 km
- 55.Yapo River, Barbaza 2.3 km
- 56.Intao Creek, Laua-an 2.1 km
- 57.Bahuyan Creek, Barbaza 1.3 km

=== Waterfalls ===
List of waterfalls in Antique.

- Tigmalmos Falls in Tibiao
- Bugtong Bato Falls in Tibiao
- Inyawan Falls in Libertad
- Sigbungon Falls in Barbaza
- Macalbag Falls in Barbaza
- Kamalasag Falls in Sebaste
- Igpasungaw Falls in Sebaste
- Bulwang Falls in Sebaste
- Nabarao Falls in Sebaste
- Capnayan Falls in Laua-an
- Kataw Falls in Culasi
- Cadiao Falls in Barbaza
- Sayay Falls in Barbaza
- Libog Falls in Culasi
- Halat Falls in Bugasong

=== Climate ===
The rainy season in Antique is from June to November, and the summer season is from December to May.

Climate data for Antique
Month	Jan	Feb	Mar	Apr	May	Jun	Jul	Aug	Sep	Oct	Nov	Dec	Year
Mean daily maximum °C (°F)	29.9 (85.8)	30.8 (87.4)	32.2 (90.0)	33.6 (92.5)	33 (91)	31.8 (89.2)	30.9 (87.6)	30.8 (87.4)	31.1 (88.0)	31.2 (88.2)	31.2 (88.2)	30.4 (86.7)	31.4 (88.5)
Mean daily minimum °C (°F)	22.8 (73.0)	23 (73)	23.5 (74.3)	24.2 (75.6)	24.6 (76.3)	24.3 (75.7)	23.9 (75.0)	23.8 (74.8)	23.8 (74.8)	23.8 (74.8)	23.5 (74.3)	23.1 (73.6)	23.7 (74.6)
Average rainy days	7	5	6	4	11	16	18	18	16	16	10	9	136
Source: Storm24/7

== Administrative divisions ==
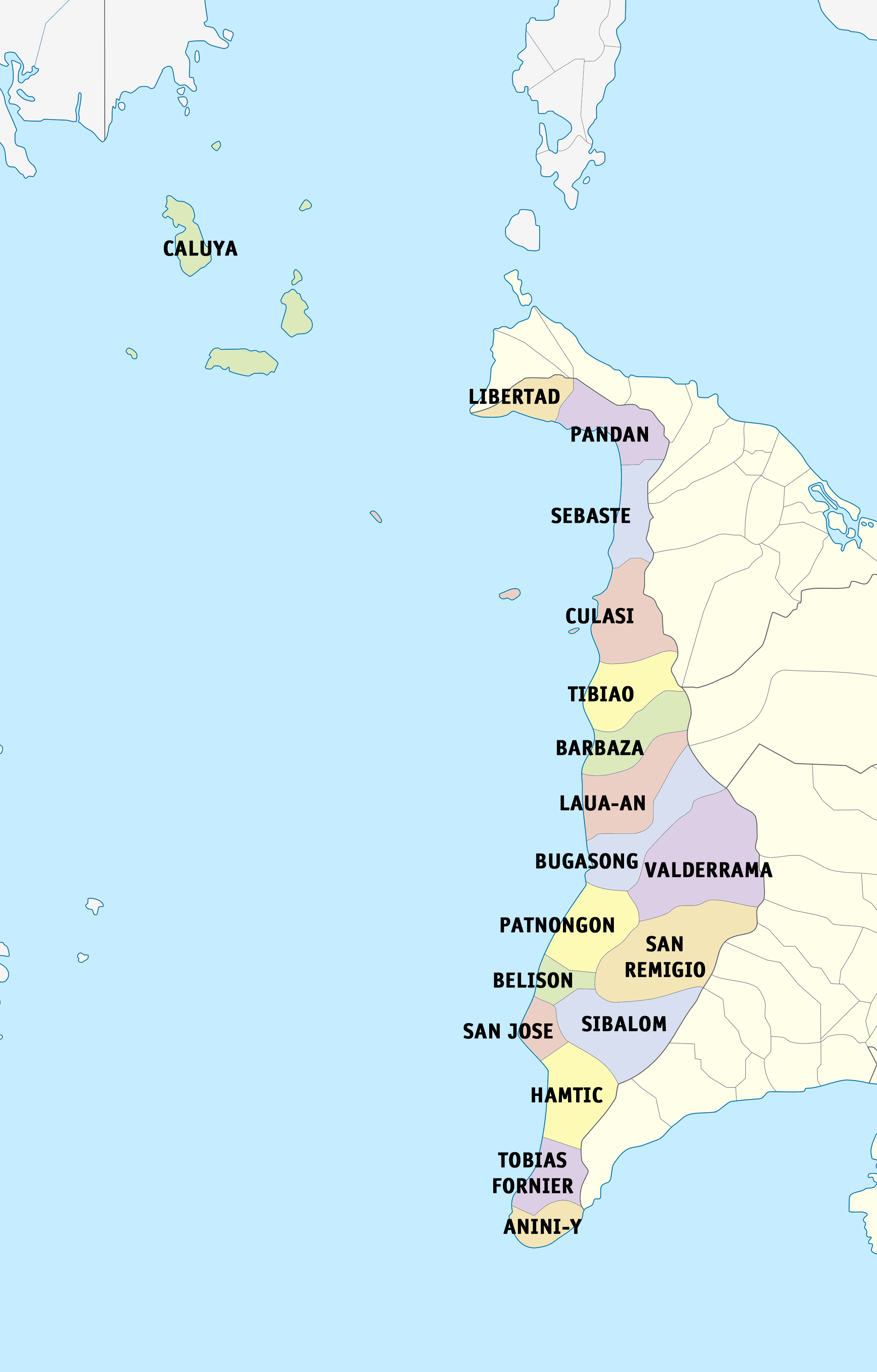
Political map of Antique

Antique is subdivided into 18 municipalities.

San Jose de Buenavista serves as the provincial capital, the center of commerce and trade, and the seat of the provincial government and national government agencies.

Municipality (Note: The globe icon marks the town center.)		Population			±% p.a.	Area		Density		Barangay
		(2020)		(2015)		km^{2}	sq mi	/km^{2}	/sq mi	
Anini-y		3.6%	22,018	21,201	+0.72%	48.89	18.88	450	1,200	23
Barbaza (Nalupa)		3.8%	23,359	22,704	+0.54%	154.36	59.60	150	390	39
Belison		2.3%	14,129	13,539	+0.82%	19.78	7.64	710	1,800	11
Bugasong (Bugason)		5.7%	34,676	33,642	+0.58%	203.71	78.65	170	440	27
Caluya		6.3%	38,908	35,496	+0.90%	136.81	52.82	280	730	18
Culasi (Bacong)		7.3%	44,494	41,228	+1.46%	228.56	88.25	190	490	44
Hamtic		8.6%	52,685	48,592	+1.55%	113.03	43.64	470	1,200	47
Laua-an		4.3%	26,580	26,072	+0.37%	100.72	38.89	260	670	40
Libertad (Inayawan)		2.9%	17,507	16,429	+1.22%	97.00	37.45	180	470	19
Pandan		5.9%	35,965	34,333	+0.89%	113.98	44.01	320	830	34
Patnongon		6.3%	38,329	37,176	+0.58%	167.92	64.83	230	600	36
San Jose de Buenavista	†	10.6%	65,140	62,534	+0.78%	48.56	18.75	1,300	3,400	28
San Remigio (Tigbagacay)		5.6%	34,045	31,935	+1.23%	406.98	157.14	84	220	45
Sebaste (Ipayo)		3.1%	18,816	17,907	+0.95%	111.64	43.10	170	440	10
Sibalom		10.4%	63,833	60,306	+1.09%	201.30	77.72	320	830	76
Tibiao		4.7%	28,703	26,748	+1.35%	177.42	68.50	160	410	21
Tobias Fornier (Dao)		5.5%	33,816	33,046	+0.44%	112.12	43.29	300	780	50
Valderrama (Kaberi-an)		3.3%	19,971	19,124	+0.83%	287.89	111.15	69	180	22
Total			612,974	582,012	+0.99%	2,730.67	1,054.32	220	570	590
Former names are italicized.	† Provincial capital				Municipality					

== Demographics ==
Population census of Antique (province)
Year	Pop.	±% p.a.
1903	134,166	—
1918	154,999	+0.97%
1939	199,414	+1.21%
1948	233,506	+1.77%
1960	238,405	+0.17%
1970	289,172	+1.95%
1975	308,484	+1.30%
1980	344,879	+2.25%
1990	406,361	+1.65%
1995	431,713	+1.14%
2000	472,822	+1.97%
2007	515,265	+1.19%
2010	546,031	+2.13%
2015	582,012	+1.22%
2020	612,974	+1.10%
2024	643,173	+1.16%
Source: Philippine Statistics Authority

The population of Antique in the 2024 census was 643,173 people, with a density of 240 inhabitants per square kilometre or 620 inhabitants per square mile. San Jose is the most populous town in the province.

Antiqueños are seafaring people that share many characteristics with their Panay neighbors. However, the steep slopes and the rugged, long mountain ranges of Antique have isolated it from the rest of Panay. Hence, they have developed their own distinct language called Kinaray-a. This language is of Austronesian origin characterized by the predominance of r's and schwa sounds spoken with a lilting gentle intonation.

The Antiqueños are noted for their industry. They are renowned weavers throughout the Visayas. The Bugasong patadyong, a tube cotton fabric of plaid design, is highly valued because of its fineness of weaving. Piña cloth is also produced on looms throughout the province. Wine manufactured from the sap of the coconut is a cottage industry.

=== Language ===
Kinaray-a is the dominant language of Antique. Hiligaynon is also widely used and it is understood by the population. Aklanon is also spoken in the northern part of the province that borders Aklan especially in the towns of Pandan and Libertad.

=== Religion ===
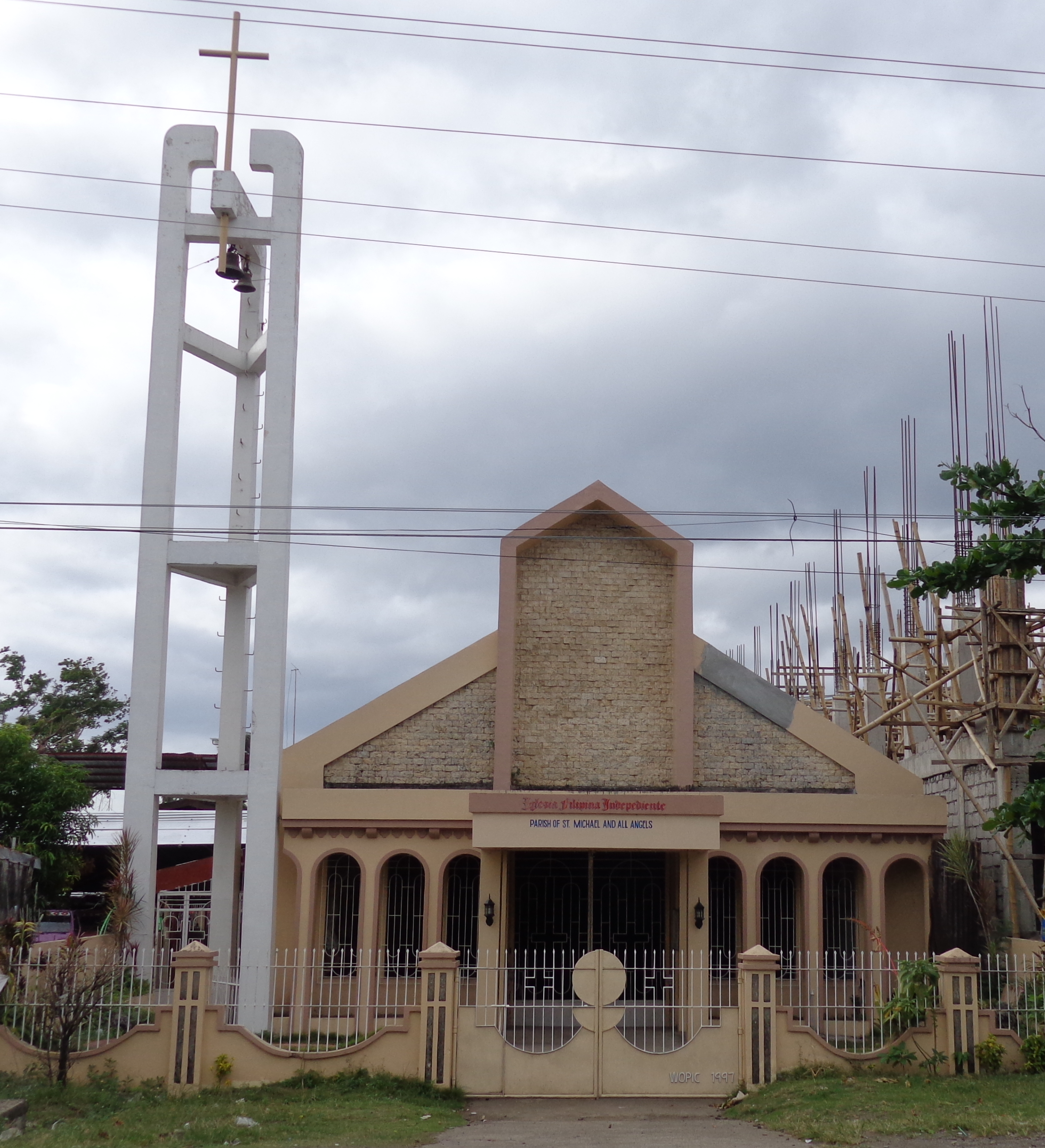
The Saint Michael and All Angels Parish Church of the Iglesia Filipina Independiente in the town of Culasi.

==== Catholicism ====
The people of Antique are predominantly Catholics, with the Catholic Church as its largest denomination. While the Iglesia Filipina Independiente or the IFI, also known as the Aglipayan Church, is the second largest religious denomination in the province. The IFI being the tangible fruit of the Philippine Revolution against the Spanish Imperialist remains significant in the present-day Antique. Both the Roman Catholic and IFI are influential in both the society and politics of the province.

==== Others ====
Other religious denominations in the province are the Members Church of God International (MCGI), Protestants and Nontrinitarian cults such as, Iglesia ni Cristo, Seventh-day Adventist Church, Jehovah's Witnesses, and the Church of Jesus Christ of Latter-day Saints, among others.

In the mountains, remnants of ancient folk beliefs persist. Babaylans or native priestesses continue to divine the future, heal the sick or conjure spells.

== Economy ==
Poverty incidence of Antique (%)

Source: Philippine Statistics Authority

=== Agriculture ===
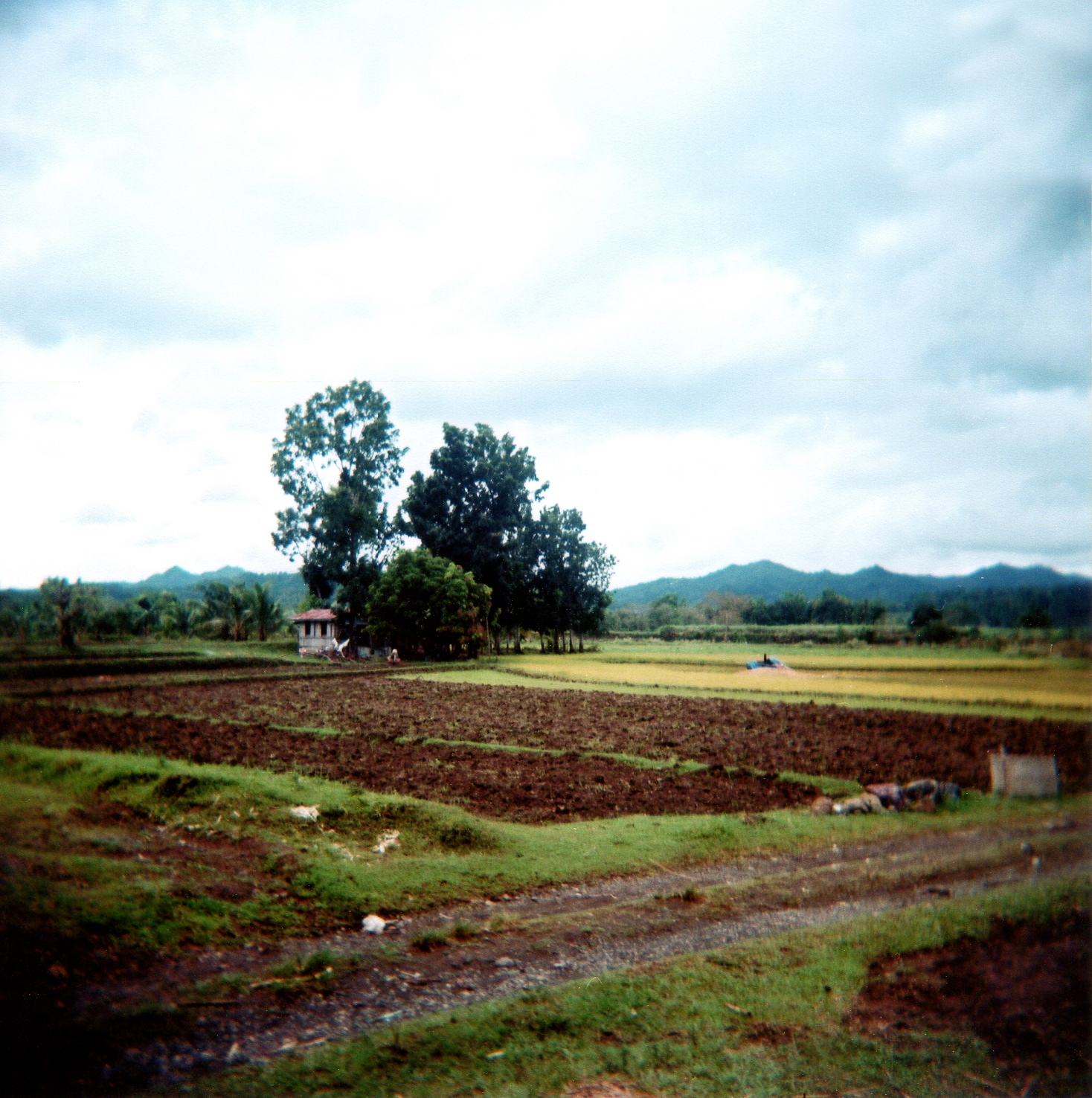
A sugarcane field in Sibalom

For the year 1998, production of palay, the primary crop of the province, registered a total of 177,521 metric tons (mt.) or 4,438,025 cavans from 58,847 hectares with an average yield of 3.02 metric tons per hectare. An increase of 8,280 mt. or 16.37 percent over last years (1997) production was observed because the area harvested has increased by 9,822 hectares or 5.86 percent. However, the average yield per hectare decreased by 0.3 mt. per hectare or 0.09 percent. The average yield per hectare for irrigated lands is 3.39 mt., 2.63 mt. for rain-fed farms, and 1.57 for upland areas. The province regularly harvests enough to feed its population. This year, there is a surplus of 83,756 mt. or 2,093,900 cavans of palay.

Copra, the second major agricultural commodity, registered a total production of 15,712 mt. in 1998 reflecting a decrease of 965 mt. (5.78%) as against last years (1997) yield of 16,677 mt. The main bulk of the copra came from the municipality of Caluya where this area accounts for 44 percent of the total copra output of the province. The area planted with coconuts constitutes about 34 percent of the total area of the province. Caluya, together with Pandan, account for more than half (53%) of the total provincial figure in terms of area planted, number of bearing trees.

=== Fishery ===
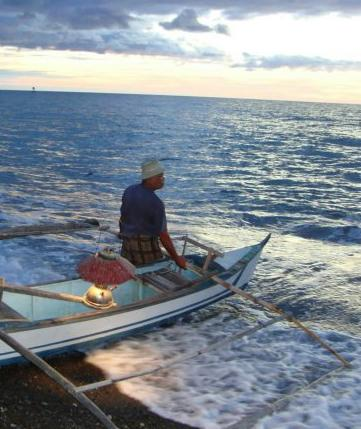
Fisherman in Bugasong

Fishing is the major source of livelihood for households in the 15 coastal municipalities. The rich fishing grounds of the Cuyo East Pass, Sulu Sea, and the municipal waters along the approximately 296.8-kilometre (184.4 mi) coastline, make fishing a promising venture. The fishing season is year round and peaks during December to June. A total of 17,437 households are directly dependent on fishing, and 39,055 households are indirectly dependent on it.

=== Livestock and poultry ===
Livestock and poultry raising in the province is through a backyard or commercial system of production. Data from Bureau of Agricultural Statistics (BAS) revealed that from 1,441,660 head of livestock and poultry in 1997, the number rose to 1,547,944 in 1998, an additional 106,284 heads, indicating a 7.37% growth. The main reason behind this growth is the increase in poultry production of almost 7.88 percent.

=== Forestry ===
Forest products include bamboo, buri, bariw, nito, log, charcoal, abaca, herbal vines and plants, wild flowers and others. These forest resources are of undetermined quantity, and are used as raw materials in the construction industry, furniture and handicraft.

One of the most notable flowers to be thriving in the Antiqueño mountains would be the rafflesia, one of the biggest flowers in the world. Rafflesia is Antique's provincial flower.

A large percentage of forestland is classified as protected (59.29 percent or 70,338.52 hectares). A little more than 50 percent of the total forestland is vegetated. The municipalities of Culasi, San Remigio and Valderrama registered the highest vegetative cover with an area of 13,005 hectares (32,140 acres), 8,637.50 hectares (21,343.7 acres) and 6,35 hectares respectively. The remaining 40.71 percent or 48,296.48 hectares (119,343.2 acres) are classified as production forests.

=== Trade, commerce, and industry ===
Major products shipped out of the province are palay, rice, copra, muscovado sugar, legumes, fruits and vegetables, livestock, fish and fish preparations, and seaweed. Manufactured items like native gifts, toys, and housewares are sold in major cities of the country and abroad. Principal mined products exported include coal, marble, silica, copper and gemstones.

The main goods entering the province are construction materials, dry goods, groceries, canned and bottled products, fertilizers and others.

The capital town of San Jose de Buenavista is the center of business in the province while Culasi is the center of the North.

Economically potential towns are San Jose, Sibalom, Caluya, Culasi, Pandan, Hamtic, Tibiao, Bugasong and Patnongon.

With the revival of Antique Airport (also called Evelio Javier Airport), commercial flights have resumed and may contribute to the development of the commerce and tourism industry especially in the capital town, San Jose.

=== Establishments ===
An establishment is an economic unit which engages under a single ownership or control. The Department of Trade and Industry (DTI) classifies establishments as manufacturing, trade and service. For 1998, fourteen manufacturing establishments were reported. Such manufacturing establishments are making hollow blocks, wood furniture, steel/wood, packed foods, metal craft, threshers, soap and sidecars. Service establishments totaled 117 and a total of 294 trade establishments.

=== Mineral resources ===
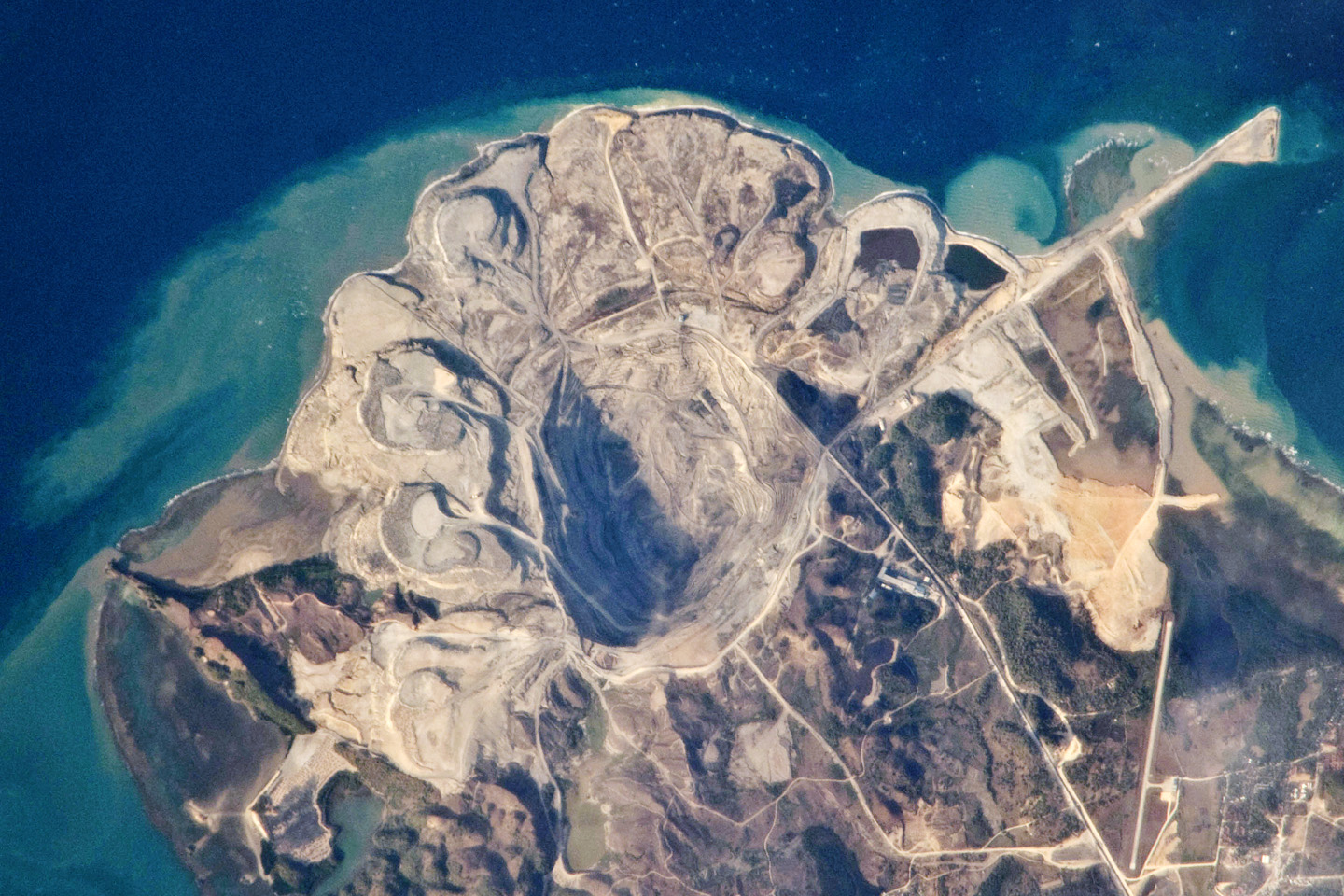
Aerial view of Panian mine in Semirara Island of Caluya

Antique has deposits of metallic and non-metallic mineral resources. The metallic mineral resources include copper, gold, chromite, pyrite, iron, manganese and ferro alloys and limestone. Copper deposits in Barbaza and San Remigio are estimated to have a volume of 36,255 metric tons and 59,445 metric tons respectively. Pyrite deposits in Valderrama and Sibalom are estimated at 120,000 metric tons while limestone deposits in Culasi are estimated at 30 billion metric tons.

The Mines and Geo-Sciences Bureau (MGB) confirms the presence of gold in Mt. Dumara, Laua-an extending as far as Lumboyan, Barbaza. An analysis conducted on ore deposits indicated that 39.75 grams of gold could be found in a metric ton of ore. Non-metallic deposits include sulfides, clay, sulfur, oil and gemstones. Marble deposits are estimated at 1.8 billion metric tons in Libertad, and 2.3 billion metric tons in Pandan. Coal reserves in Caluya are estimated to be 1.6 million metric tons.

An indication of oil deposits was recently discovered at Maniguin Island in Culasi.

== Tourism ==
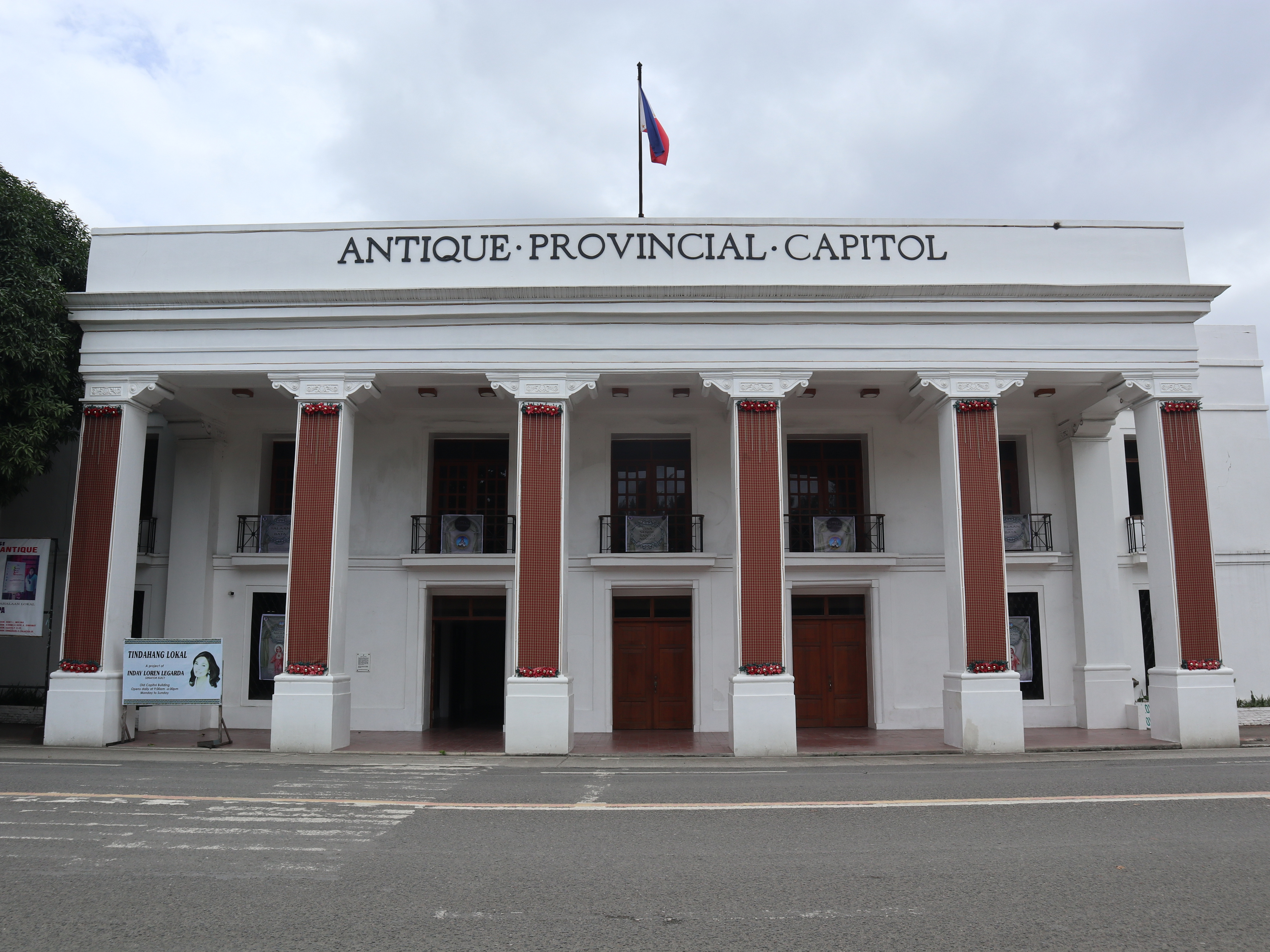
The old provincial capitol of Antique in San Jose de Buenavista, now used as a provincial museum

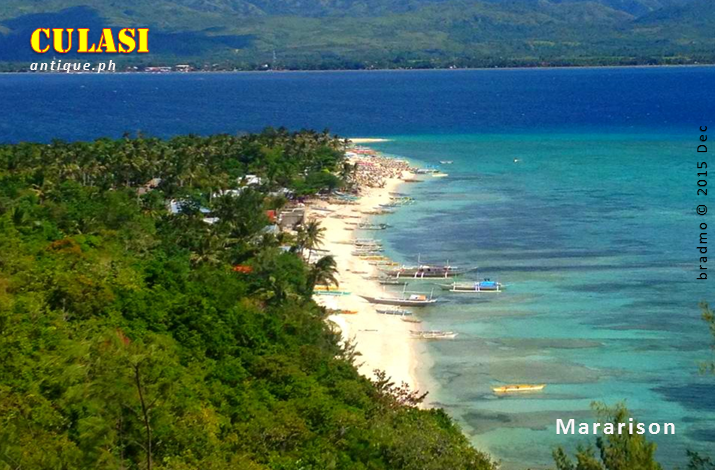
Mararison Island in Culasi

The whole stretch of coastal areas in Antique is suited for scuba diving. Starting from the southern town of Antique tourists can drop by Sira-an Hot Spring, claimed to be a medical spring. The next destination is the capital town of San Jose de Buenavista passing by Malandog Marker, site of the first Malayan Settlement and the newly constructed Marina Bay. Tourism amenities like restaurants, two shopping malls, pasalubong centers, accommodations and beach resorts are present. Rafflesia, the largest flower in the world, can be found in Sibalom Natural Park. In the municipalities of Patnongon and Laua-an, tourists interested in traditional methods can visit muscovado mills and watch how muscovado sugar is processed. Products made with muscovado are also available; Laua-an is noted for its long butong-butong (a candy made with muscovado sugar). Tibiao has the kawa bath, Bugtong Bato Falls and the Fish SPA. From Culasi, Mount Madja-as can be seen, the "Mount Olympus" of Antique. Sebaste has the Igpasungaw Falls, the Sebaste Inland Resort and the most visited Saint Blaise Church, where devotees of St. Blaise make a pilgrimage every year during the annual fiesta, Pandan has Malumpati Health Spring and Bugang River—declared as the cleanest body of water in the whole country by the Gawad Pangulo sa Kapaligiran—where rafting and river boating can be experienced. This is the most developed tourism area with a tour package. Libertad is known for its bariw mat and bag weaving. San Remigio was recently tagged as the summer capital of the province with cool weather to enjoy and a strawberry farm.

=== Binirayan festival ===
Started in San Jose in 1974 by governor Evelio Javier, this is a week-long festival that includes colorful street parades, beach shows, plaza concerts, a beauty contest and a trade fair. "Binirayan" biray, or "sailboat" in Kinaray-a (Antique's local language), refers to the Pre-Hispanic legend of the Bornean datus to reach Malandog beach, where they befriended the Atis (Aetas) and eventually started a civilization. Antique tradition holds that it was founded by Bornean Malays in the 12th century, although this had been called erroneously as a hoax, recent studies show there is support for this claim in contemporary records from Chinese annals and as well as early Spanish records pre dating the maragtas work by Moteclaro. According to legend, 10 Bornean datus (chieftains) claimed Panay island and their leader, Datu Sumakwel, founded the settlement in Malandog, Hamtik, Antique.

== Transportation ==
=== Roads ===
Antique has a total road length of 340 km (210 mi) including a 208 km (129 mi) National Road linking the province from Libertad in the north to Anini-y in the south. Transportation services are generally provided by tricycles, jeepneys, vans and buses. There are also daily buses to Manila via the roll-on/roll-off nautical highway and other neighboring provinces and cities including Iloilo City and Kalibo.

=== Airports ===
Evelio Javier Airport (Antique Airport), located in San Jose de Buenavista, is the only airport in the province with flights to Manila operated by PAL Express. Semirara Island in Caluya has an airstrip that has chartered flights to Manila.

=== Seaports ===
Seaports in the province include the Lipata Port in Culasi and the San Jose Port in San Jose de Buenavista. Lipata Port in Culasi is used to travel to Caluya.

== Government ==
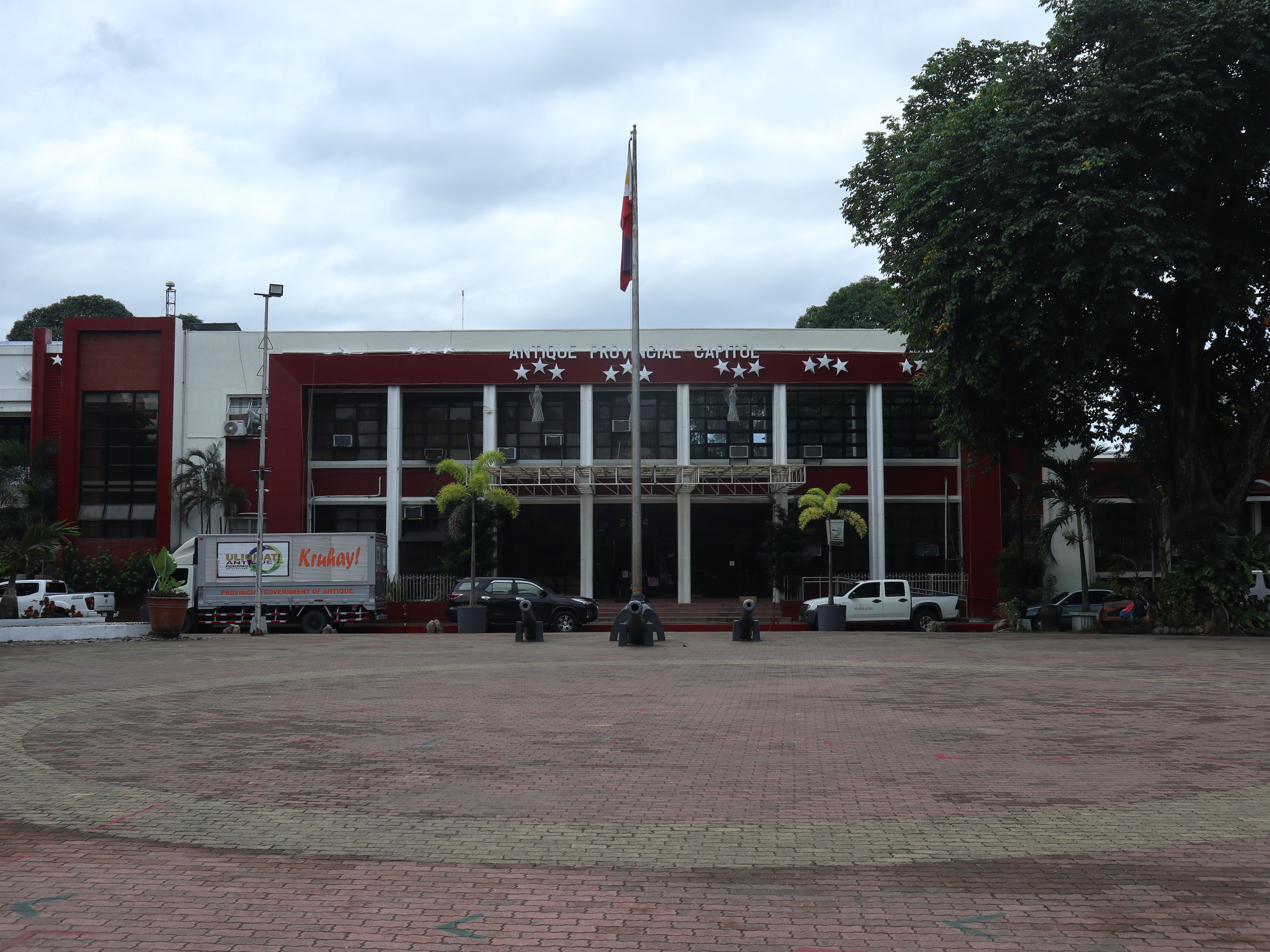
Antique Provincial Capitol Building in San Jose de Buenavista.

== Education ==
=== Universities and colleges ===
- Advance Central College (ACC) (San Jose, Antique)
- University of Antique (Main Campus) Sibalom, Antique
  - University of Antique (Tibiao Campus)
  - University of Antique (Hamtic Campus)
  - University of Antique (Caluya Campus)
  - University of Antique (Libertad Campus)
- University of the Philippines - Visayas Extension Campus (Pandan, Antique)
- Pandan Bay Institute (Pandan, Antique)
- Saint Anthony's College (San Jose, Antique)
- STI Antique (San Jose, Antique)
- Vicente A. Javier Memorial Community College (Culasi, Antique)

== Notable people ==
- Loren Legarda - senator, journalist, and UN Global Champion for Resilience
- Jerry Navarro Elizalde - Philippine National Artist for Visual Arts - Painting
- Evelio Javier - Filipino lawyer, civil servant, politician, and an opposition leader during the regime of President Ferdinand Marcos. His assassination on February 11, 1986, allegedly by allies of Marcos, was one of the sparks of the People Power Revolution later that month.
- John Iremil Teodoro - Filipino writer, university professor and freelance journalist. He is also a multi-awarded poet and playwright, one of the country's leading pioneers in gay literature and the most published author in Kinaray-a to date.
- Richard Yee - Filipino professional basketball player who last played for the Barako Bull Energy Boosters in the Philippine Basketball Association.
- Alberto A. Villavert - Filipino politician who led the Philippine Province of Antique between 1937 and 1946 both as an appointed and elected Governor. He was first elected as presidente municipal (town mayor) of Antique's capital town of San Jose in 1928 and was the youngest presidente municipal in his time at the age of 24 and then became governor of the province in 1937. Villavert became an Antique Representative of the National Assembly from 1943 to 1944. During World War II, he served in the USAFFE and subsequently appointed as Governor of the Province again from 1946 to 1947 and then elected and served the same post from 1948 – 1951.
- Megan Young - Filipino-American actress, model, TV host and beauty queen. She won the Miss World Philippines title and was later crowned as Miss World 2013 in Bali, Indonesia. She is the daughter of Victoria Talde who hails from Pandan, Antique.
- Lauren Anne Young - Filipino-American actress and model. She is the younger sister of actress and Miss World 2013 Megan Young.
- Genevieve L. Asenjo - Filipino poet, novelist, translator and literary scholar in Kinaray-a, Hiligaynon and Filipino. Asenjo is an associate professor at De La Salle University in Manila. In 2010, she founded Balay Sugidanun (The House of Storytelling).
- Lisa Macuja-Elizalde - Ballerina
- Calixto Zaldivar – former representative, Lone District of Antique (1934–1935), former governor of Antique (1951–1955) and former Associate Justice of the Supreme Court (1964–1974). Former president of the National Lay Organization of the Iglesia Filipina. Honored at the Bantayog ng mga Bayani as among the heroes and martyrs who fought the authoritarian dictatorship of Ferdinand Marcos.
- Nelia Sancho (1951–2022) - Filipina Beauty Queen and Fashion Model born in Botbot, Pandan, Antique was Binibining Pilipinas 1969 1st-Runner Up to Gloria Diaz, and Queen of the Pacific 1971 winner.
- Alfredo Siojo Lim, former senator and former mayor of City of Manila. He is the Son of Quintin Lim Sr.
