= Patnongon =

Municipality in Antique, Philippines

- Municipality
- Municipality of Patnongon
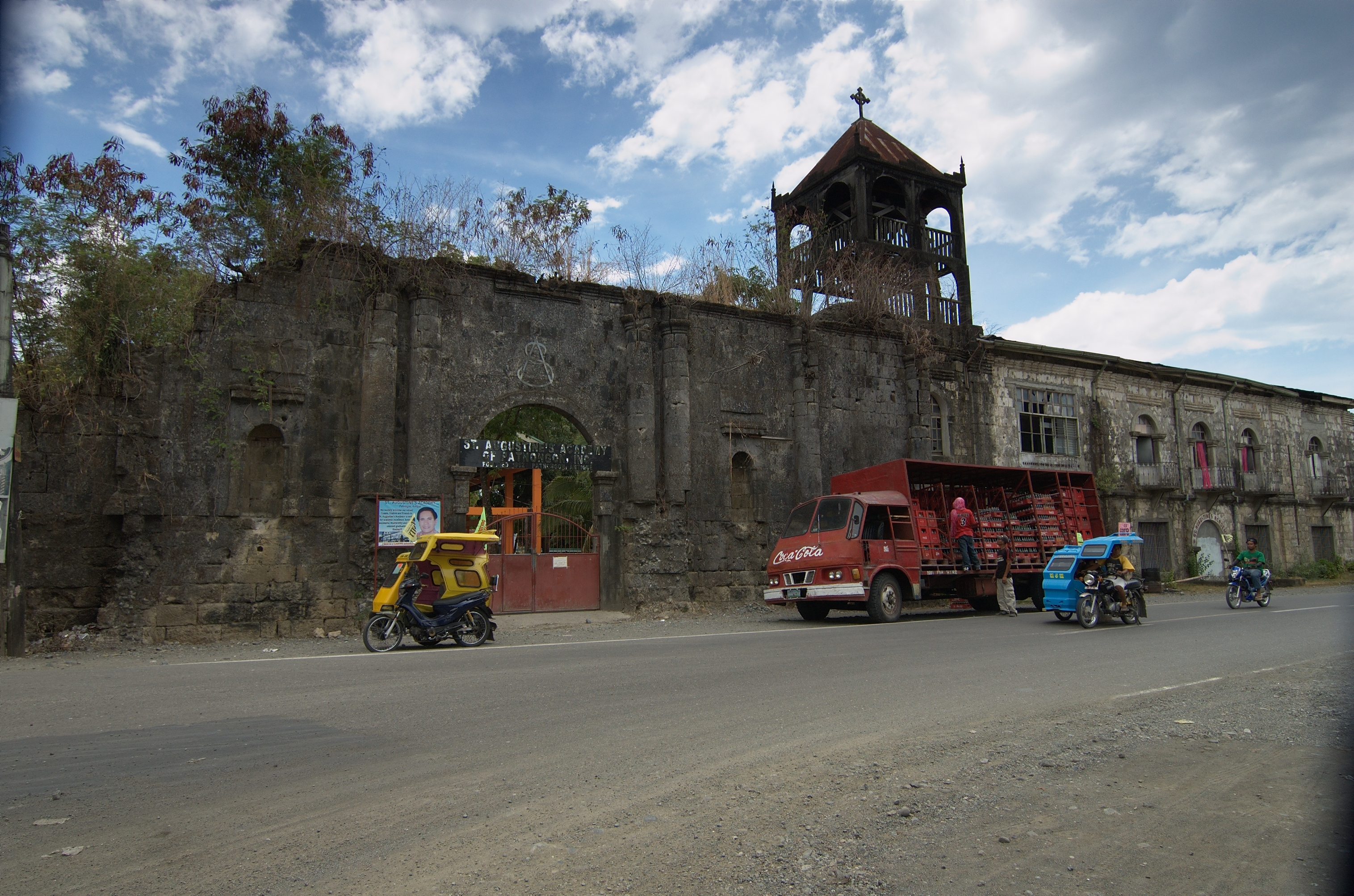
- Patnongon Church

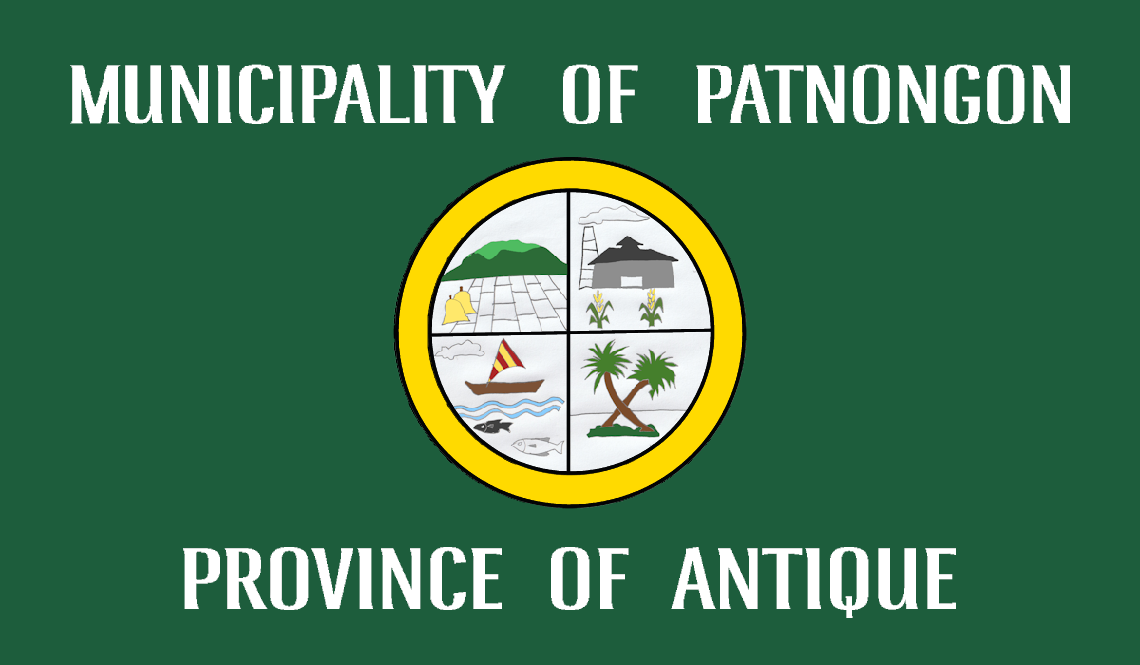
- Flag

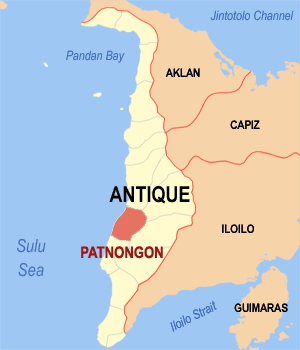
- Map of Antique with Patnongon highlighted
- Interactive map of Patnongon
- Location within the Philippines
- Coordinates: 10°54′51″N 121°59′41″E
- Country: Philippines
- Region: Western Visayas
- Province: Antique
- District: Lone district
- Barangays: 36 (see Barangays)

Government
  - Type: Sangguniang Bayan
  - Mayor: Johnny Flores S. Bacongallo
  - Vice Mayor: Thomas Bacaoco
  - Representative: Loren Legarda
  - Municipal Council: Members: Gemma B. Cepeda; Thomas V. Bacaoco; Gregorio L. Gumawa; Carmelo R. Otico; Jeany E. Servillon; William E. Solis; Al Brian T. Crespo; Eduardo B. Magbanua
  - Electorate: 22,848 voters (2025)

Area
  - Total: 167.92 km^{2} (64.83 sq mi)
- Elevation: 70 m (230 ft)
- Highest elevation: 882 m (2,894 ft)
- Lowest elevation: 0 m (0 ft)

Population (2024 census)
  - Total: 40,070
  - Density: 238.6/km^{2} (618.0/sq mi)
  - Households: 9,785
- Demonym: Patnonganon

Economy
  - Income class: 2nd municipal income class
  - Poverty incidence: 21.52% (2023)
  - Revenue: ₱ 200.2 million (2024)
  - Assets: ₱ 585.1 million (2024)
  - Expenditure: ₱ 170.7 million (2024)
  - Liabilities: ₱ 136.5 million (2024)

Service provider
  - Electricity: Antique Electric Cooperative (ANTECO)
- Time zone: UTC+8 (PST)
- ZIP code: 5702
- PSGC: 060612000
- IDD : area code: +63 (0)36
- Native languages: Karay-a; Hiligaynon; Tagalog
- Website: lgupatnongon.gov.ph

Patnongon, officially the Municipality of Patnongon (Kinaray-a: Banwa kang Patnongon; Hiligaynon: Banwa sang Patnongon; Tagalog: Bayan ng Patnongon), is a municipality in the province of Antique, Philippines. According to the 2024 census, it has a population of 40,070 people.

== History ==
The town's early history traces back to pre-colonial settlements that formed long before Spanish contact. The area grew around farming and coastal trade, then moved into formal town status under Spanish rule. The 1818 Spanish census them recorded 2,097 native families in the area, living in harmony with 3 Spanish-Filipino families.

Local leaders expanded services during the American period and the town rebuilt after the war.

== Geography ==
Patnongon is 25 kilometres (16 mi) from the provincial capital, San Jose de Buenavista.

According to the Philippine Statistics Authority, the municipality has a land area of 167.92 square kilometres (64.83 sq mi) constituting 6.15% of the 2,729.17-square-kilometre- (1,053.74 sq mi) total area of Antique.

=== Barangays ===
Patnongon is politically subdivided into 36 barangays. Each barangay consists of puroks and some have sitios.

PSGC	Barangay	Population			±% p.a.	
		2024		2010		
060612001	Alvañiz	0.6%	257	212	▴	1.34%
060612002	Amparo	1.8%	725	676	▴	0.49%
060612003	Apgahan	4.2%	1,671	1,573	▴	0.42%
060612004	Aureliana	6.4%	2,551	2,272	▴	0.81%
060612005	Badiangan	1.8%	725	685	▴	0.39%
060612006	Bernaldo A. Julagting (Bitas)	2.0%	786	749	▴	0.34%
060612007	Carit-an	5.0%	2,018	1,912	▴	0.38%
060612008	Cuyapiao	2.6%	1,050	1,020	▴	0.20%
060612010	Gella	1.0%	416	388	▴	0.48%
060612011	Igbarawan	3.9%	1,565	1,418	▴	0.69%
060612012	Igbobon	1.9%	742	597	▴	1.52%
060612013	Igburi	3.1%	1,260	998	▴	1.63%
060612014	La Rioja	5.7%	2,278	2,266	▴	0.04%
060612015	Mabasa	2.9%	1,151	1,032	▴	0.76%
060612016	Macarina	1.7%	689	659	▴	0.31%
060612017	Magarang	1.1%	441	355	▴	1.52%
060612018	Magsaysay	3.8%	1,533	1,457	▴	0.35%
060612019	Padang	4.2%	1,663	1,576	▴	0.37%
060612020	Pandanan	2.4%	953	911	▴	0.31%
060612021	Patlabawon	1.2%	494	453	▴	0.60%
060612022	Poblacion	15.1%	6,044	5,701	▴	0.41%
060612023	Quezon	0.9%	346	314	▴	0.68%
060612024	Salaguiawan	1.3%	539	468	▴	0.99%
060612025	Samalague	2.4%	970	1,541	▾	−3.16%
060612026	San Rafael	2.1%	829	803	▴	0.22%
060612028	Tamayoc	3.3%	1,330	1,304	▴	0.14%
060612029	Tigbalogo	1.4%	570	541	▴	0.36%
060612027	Tobias Fornier	1.1%	441	411	▴	0.49%
060612030	Villa Crespo	1.2%	463	413	▴	0.80%
060612031	Villa Cruz	1.4%	543	446	▴	1.38%
060612009	Villa Elio	1.1%	429	386	▴	0.74%
060612032	Villa Flores	0.5%	191	175	▴	0.61%
060612033	Villa Laua-an	0.8%	340	306	▴	0.73%
060612034	Villa Sal	0.7%	271	236	▴	0.96%
060612035	Villa Salomon	1.1%	423	390	▴	0.57%
060612036	Vista Alegre	1.2%	479	458	▴	0.31%
	Total		40,070	35,102	▴	0.92%

=== Climate ===
Climate data for Patnongon, Antique
Month	Jan	Feb	Mar	Apr	May	Jun	Jul	Aug	Sep	Oct	Nov	Dec	Year
Mean daily maximum °C (°F)	30 (86)	31 (88)	32 (90)	33 (91)	32 (90)	30 (86)	29 (84)	29 (84)	29 (84)	29 (84)	30 (86)	30 (86)	30 (87)
Mean daily minimum °C (°F)	22 (72)	22 (72)	22 (72)	24 (75)	25 (77)	25 (77)	25 (77)	25 (77)	25 (77)	24 (75)	23 (73)	22 (72)	24 (75)
Average precipitation mm (inches)	48 (1.9)	41 (1.6)	58 (2.3)	82 (3.2)	223 (8.8)	300 (11.8)	346 (13.6)	307 (12.1)	311 (12.2)	292 (11.5)	167 (6.6)	81 (3.2)	2,256 (88.8)
Average rainy days	11.4	7.7	11.3	15.4	25.7	28.5	29.5	28.7	28.3	28.7	21.8	15.2	252.2
Source: Meteoblue (modeled/calculated data, not measured locally)

== Demographics ==
Patnongon Municipal Hall

Population census of Patnongon

Year	Pop.	±% p.a.
1903	14,319	—
1918	15,721	+0.62%
1939	20,012	+1.16%
1948	23,145	+1.63%
1960	23,207	+0.02%
1970	22,443	−0.33%
1975	22,643	+0.18%
1980	24,262	+1.39%

Year	Pop.	±% p.a.
1990	27,376	+1.22%
1995	29,235	+1.24%
2000	31,555	+1.65%
2007	33,694	+0.91%
2010	35,102	+1.50%
2015	37,176	+1.10%
2020	38,329	+0.64%
2024	40,070	+1.07%

Source: Philippine Statistics Authority

In the 2024 census, Patnongon had a population of 40,070 people. The population density was 240 inhabitants per square kilometre (620/sq mi).

=== Language ===
Patnonganons speak Kinaray-a as their main language while Hiligaynon is used as their secondary language.

== Economy ==
Poverty incidence of Patnongon (%)

Source: Philippine Statistics Authority

== Tourism ==
- La Parola Orchids Beach Resort in Barangay Amparo
- Igbarawan Garden Resort in Igbarawan
- Bato-Bugtong Beach and resort in Igbarawan
- D'Viking Beach Resort in Igbarawan
- Apgahan Beach Resort / San Ramon Beach Resort
- Bato Tibi of Tamayoc
- Villa Alma Beach Resort in Padang
- Mountain Climbing in small mountains near Padang, Apgahan, Aureliana, La-Rioja and Aureliana where one can find fruit‑bearing wild trees
- Old Municipal Building Constructed by Spaniards
- Old Spanish Church Convent now Saint Augustine's Academy of Patnongon, Inc. old building (It is believed that if it was not bombed by the Americans during World War II, the Patnongon Church would have been the biggest in Antique Province and one of the oldest churches in the Philippines.)
- Spelunking in Kuweba Dapa and Kuweba Turu-ong in Barangay San Rafael
- Shrine of Rosa Mystica in Tigmanali
- Linaw-Balud Falls in Barangay Igburi
- Lipunto Range in Barangay Patlabawon
- Ulo Kuliatan and Busay Luhot in Aureliana, Patnongon, Antique
- Guinobatan Mountain at the boundary of Belison and Aureliana
- Madlakat Cliff in the Boundary of San Remegio, Sibalom, Patlabawon and Aureliana

== Education ==
There are two schools district offices which govern all educational institutions within the municipality. They oversee the management and operations of all private and public, from primary to secondary schools. These are the:

- Patnongon I Schools District
- Patnongon II Schools District

=== Primary and elementary schools ===
- Amarong Elementary School
- Apgahan Elementary School
- Aureliana Elementary School
- Baybay Elementary School
- Bitas Elementary School
- Causeway Learning Center
- Col. Ruperto Abellon Sr. Memorial School
- Carit-an Central School
- Cuyapiao Elementary School
- Gella Elementary School
- Esteban-Talidong Elementary School (Pandanan Elementary School)
- Igbarawan-Mabasa Elementary School
- Igbobon Amparo Elementary School
- Igburi Elementary School
- Igcapayas Primary School
- La Rioja Elementary School
- Magranting Elementary School
- Magsaysay Elementary School
- Macarina Elementary School
- Magarang Elementary School
- Padang Elementary School
- Panacawon Elementary School
- Patlabawon Elementary School
- Patnongon Baptist Church Preparatory School
- Quezon Primary School
- Salaguiawan Elementary School
- Samalague Elementary School
- San Rafael Elementary School
- St. Augustine's Academy
- T. Dela Cruz Elementary School
- Tamayoc Elementary School
- Tig-angkal Primary School
- Tigbalogo Elementary School
- Tobias Fornier Elementary School
- Villa Crespo Elementary School
- Villa Cruz Primary School
- Villa Flores Elementary School
- Villa Laua-an-Villa Sal Elementary School
- Villa Salomon Elementary School
- Vista Alegre Elementary School

=== Secondary schools ===
- Aureliana National High School
- Igburi National High School
- Lirio M. Escaño National High School

== Culture ==
Udyakan Festival sa Patnongon is held every last Monday of February. The event features street dancing, fire dance shows, the Parada kang Karusa competition, and displays of local crafts and food. Each barangay prepares a float that highlights its livelihood.
