= Iloilo's 4th congressional district =

Legislative district of the Philippines

- Constituency for the House of Representatives of the Philippines
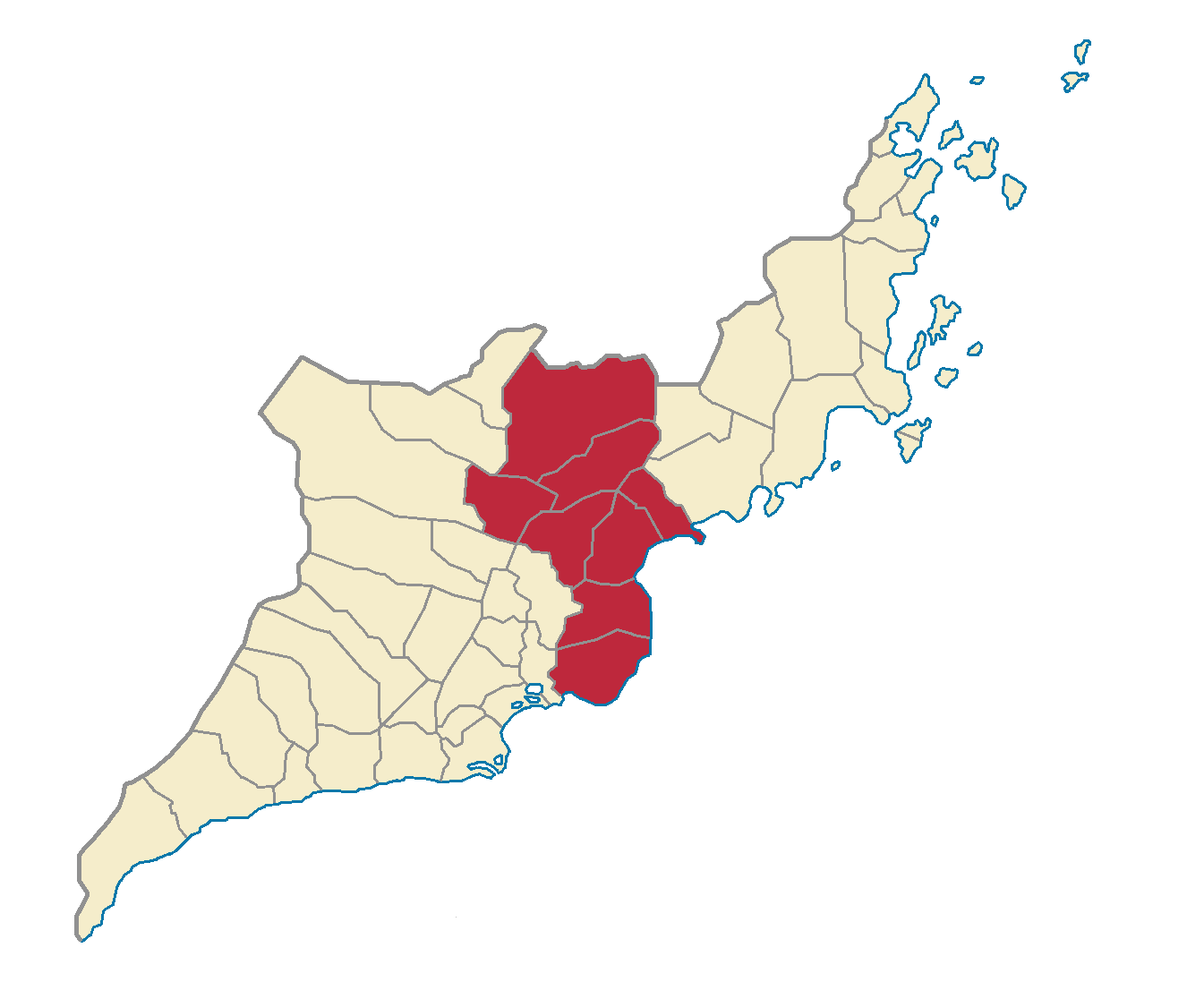
- Boundary of Iloilo's 4th congressional district in Iloilo

- Location of Iloilo within the Philippines
- Province: Iloilo
- Region: Western Visayas
- Population: 378,502 (2015)
- Electorate: 220,814 (2016)
- Major settlements: 8 LGUs: Cities; Passi; Municipalities; Anilao; Banate; Barotac Nuevo; Dingle; Dueñas; Dumangas; San Enrique
- Area: 976.95 km^{2} (377.20 sq mi)

Current constituency
- Created: 1907
- Representative: Ferjenel Biron
- Political party: Nacionalista
- Congressional bloc: Majority

Iloilo's 4th congressional district is one of the five congressional districts of the Philippines in the province of Iloilo. It has been represented in the House of Representatives of the Philippines since 1916 and earlier in the Philippine Assembly from 1907 to 1916. The district consists of the city of Passi and adjacent municipalities of Anilao, Banate, Barotac Nuevo, Dingle, Dueñas, Dumangas and San Enrique. It is currently represented in the 20th Congress by Ferjenel Biron of the Nacionalista Party (NP).

== Representation history ==
| # | Image | Member | Term of office | | Legislature | Party | Electoral history | Constituent LGUs |
| # | Image | Member | Start | End | Legislature | Party | Electoral history | Constituent LGUs |
|---|---|---|---|---|---|---|---|---|
=== Iloilo's 4th district for the Philippine Assembly ===
District created January 9, 1907.
| 1 | | Adriano Hernández y Dayot | October 16, 1907 | October 16, 1909 | 1st | Nacionalista | Elected in 1907. | 1907–1909; Barotac Nuevo (Dumangas), Dingle, Janiuay (Lambunao), Pototan (Mina) |
| 2 | | Espiridión Guanco | October 16, 1909 | October 16, 1912 | 2nd | Nacionalista | Elected in 1909. | 1909–1912; Barotac Nuevo (Dumangas), Dingle, Janiuay (Lambunao), Pototan (Mina) |
| 3 | | Amando Avanceña | October 16, 1912 | June 30, 1914 | 3rd | Nacionalista | Elected in 1912. Resigned on election as Iloilo governor. | 1912–1916; Barotac Nuevo, Dingle, Dumangas, Janiuay, Lambunao, Pototan (Mina) |
| 4 | | Tiburcio Lutero | August 28, 1914 | October 16, 1916 | 3rd | Progresista | Elected to finish Avanceña's term. | 1912–1916; Barotac Nuevo, Dingle, Dumangas, Janiuay, Lambunao, Pototan (Mina) |
=== Iloilo's 4th district for the House of Representatives of the Philippine Islands ===
| (4) | | Tiburcio Lutero | October 16, 1916 | June 3, 1919 | 4th | Progresista | Re-elected in 1916. | 1916–1922; Barotac Nuevo, Dingle, Dumangas, Janiuay, Lambunao, Pototan (Mina) |
| 5 | | Daniel Evangelista | June 3, 1919 | June 6, 1922 | 5th | Nacionalista | Elected in 1919. | 1916–1922; Barotac Nuevo, Dingle, Dumangas, Janiuay, Lambunao, Pototan (Mina) |
| 6 | | Federico Román Tirador | June 6, 1922 | June 2, 1925 | 6th | Nacionalista; Colectivista | Elected in 1922. | 1922–1935; Barotac Nuevo, Calinog, Dingle, Dumangas, Lambunao, Pototan (Mina) |
| 7 | | Asención Arancillo | June 2, 1925 | June 5, 1928 | 7th | Nacionalista; Consolidado | Elected in 1925. | 1922–1935; Barotac Nuevo, Calinog, Dingle, Dumangas, Lambunao, Pototan (Mina) |
| 8 | | Tomás Buenaflor | June 5, 1928 | June 5, 1934 | 8th | Nacionalista; Consolidado | Elected in 1928. | 1922–1935; Barotac Nuevo, Calinog, Dingle, Dumangas, Lambunao, Pototan (Mina) |
| 8 | | Tomás Buenaflor | June 5, 1928 | June 5, 1934 | 9th | Nacionalista; Consolidado | Re-elected in 1931. | 1922–1935; Barotac Nuevo, Calinog, Dingle, Dumangas, Lambunao, Pototan (Mina) |
| (6) | | Federico Román Tirador | June 5, 1934 | September 16, 1935 | 10th | Nacionalista; Demócrata Pro-Independencia | Elected in 1934. | 1922–1935; Barotac Nuevo, Calinog, Dingle, Dumangas, Lambunao, Pototan (Mina) |
| # | Image | Member | Term of office | | National Assembly | Party | Electoral history | Constituent LGUs |
| # | Image | Member | Start | End | National Assembly | Party | Electoral history | Constituent LGUs |
=== Iloilo's 4th district for the National Assembly (Commonwealth of the Philippines) ===
| (8) | | Tomás Buenaflor | September 16, 1935 | December 30, 1941 | 1st | Nacionalista; Democrático | Elected in 1935. | 1935–1941; Barotac Nuevo, Calinog, Dingle, Dumangas, Lambunao, Pototan (Mina) |
| (8) | | Tomás Buenaflor | September 16, 1935 | December 30, 1941 | 2nd | Nacionalista | Re-elected in 1938. | 1935–1941; Barotac Nuevo, Calinog, Dingle, Dumangas, Lambunao, Pototan (Mina) |
District dissolved into the two-seat Iloilo's at-large district and the two-seat Iloilo City's at-large district for the National Assembly (Second Philippine Republic).
| # | Image | Member | Term of office | | Common wealth Congress | Party | Electoral history | Constituent LGUs |
| # | Image | Member | Start | End | Common wealth Congress | Party | Electoral history | Constituent LGUs |
=== Iloilo's 4th district for the House of Representatives of the Commonwealth of the Philippines ===
District re-created May 24, 1945.
| 9 | | Ceferino de los Santos | June 9, 1945 | May 25, 1946 | 1st | Nacionalista | Elected in 1941. | 1945–1946; Barotac Nuevo, Calinog, Dingle, Dumangas, Lambunao, Pototan (Mina) |
| # | Image | Member | Term of office | | Congress | Party | Electoral history | Constituent LGUs |
| # | Image | Member | Start | End | Congress | Party | Electoral history | Constituent LGUs |
=== Iloilo's 4th district for the House of Representatives of the Philippines ===
| 10 | | Mariano B. Peñaflorida | May 25, 1946 | November 11, 1947 | 1st | Nacionalista | Elected in 1946. Resigned on election as Iloilo governor. | 1946–1969; Barotac Nuevo, Calinog, Dingle, Dumangas, Lambunao, Pototan (Mina) |
| 11 | | Gaudencio Demaisip | March 23, 1948 | December 30, 1949 | 1st | Nacionalista | Elected to finish Peñaflorida's term. | 1946–1969; Barotac Nuevo, Calinog, Dingle, Dumangas, Lambunao, Pototan (Mina) |
| 12 | | Ricardo Ladrido | December 30, 1949 | December 30, 1969 | 2nd | Nacionalista | Elected in 1949. | 1946–1969; Barotac Nuevo, Calinog, Dingle, Dumangas, Lambunao, Pototan (Mina) |
| 12 | | Ricardo Ladrido | December 30, 1949 | December 30, 1969 | 3rd | Democratic | Re-elected in 1953. | 1946–1969; Barotac Nuevo, Calinog, Dingle, Dumangas, Lambunao, Pototan (Mina) |
| 12 | | Ricardo Ladrido | December 30, 1949 | December 30, 1969 | 4th | Nacionalista | Re-elected in 1957. | 1946–1969; Barotac Nuevo, Calinog, Dingle, Dumangas, Lambunao, Pototan (Mina) |
| 12 | | Ricardo Ladrido | December 30, 1949 | December 30, 1969 | 5th | Nacionalista | Re-elected in 1961. | 1946–1969; Barotac Nuevo, Calinog, Dingle, Dumangas, Lambunao, Pototan (Mina) |
| 12 | | Ricardo Ladrido | December 30, 1949 | December 30, 1969 | 6th | Nacionalista | Re-elected in 1965. | 1946–1969; Barotac Nuevo, Calinog, Dingle, Dumangas, Lambunao, Pototan (Mina) |
| (10) | | Mariano B. Peñaflorida | December 30, 1969 | September 23, 1972 | 7th | Nacionalista | Elected in 1969. Removed from office after imposition of martial law. | 1969–1972; Barotac Nuevo, Bingawan, Calinog, Dingle, Dumangas, Lambunao, Mina, Pototan |
District dissolved into the sixteen-seat Region VI's at-large district for the Interim Batasang Pambansa, followed by the five-seat Iloilo's at-large district for the Regular Batasang Pambansa.
District re-created February 2, 1987.
| 13 | | Narciso Monfort | June 30, 1987 | June 30, 1992 | 8th | KBL | Elected in 1987. | 1987–present Anilao, Banate, Barotac Nuevo, Dingle, Dueñas, Dumangas, Passi, San Enrique |
| 13 | | Narciso Monfort | June 30, 1987 | June 30, 1992 | 8th | LDP | Elected in 1987. | 1987–present Anilao, Banate, Barotac Nuevo, Dingle, Dueñas, Dumangas, Passi, San Enrique |
| 14 | | Nicetas P. Panes | June 30, 1992 | June 30, 1995 | 9th | LDP | Elected in 1992. | 1987–present Anilao, Banate, Barotac Nuevo, Dingle, Dueñas, Dumangas, Passi, San Enrique |
| 14 | | Nicetas P. Panes | June 30, 1992 | June 30, 1995 | 9th | Lakas | Elected in 1992. | 1987–present Anilao, Banate, Barotac Nuevo, Dingle, Dueñas, Dumangas, Passi, San Enrique |
| (13) | | Narciso Monfort | June 30, 1995 | June 30, 2004 | 10th | LDP | Elected in 1995. | 1987–present Anilao, Banate, Barotac Nuevo, Dingle, Dueñas, Dumangas, Passi, San Enrique |
| (13) | | Narciso Monfort | June 30, 1995 | June 30, 2004 | 11th | Lakas | Re-elected in 1998. | 1987–present Anilao, Banate, Barotac Nuevo, Dingle, Dueñas, Dumangas, Passi, San Enrique |
| (13) | | Narciso Monfort | June 30, 1995 | June 30, 2004 | 12th | Lakas | Re-elected in 2001. | 1987–present Anilao, Banate, Barotac Nuevo, Dingle, Dueñas, Dumangas, Passi, San Enrique |
| 15 | | Ferjenel Biron | June 30, 2004 | June 30, 2013 | 13th | KAMPI | Elected in 2004. | 1987–present Anilao, Banate, Barotac Nuevo, Dingle, Dueñas, Dumangas, Passi, San Enrique |
| 15 | | Ferjenel Biron | June 30, 2004 | June 30, 2013 | 14th | Nacionalista | Re-elected in 2007. | 1987–present Anilao, Banate, Barotac Nuevo, Dingle, Dueñas, Dumangas, Passi, San Enrique |
| 15 | | Ferjenel Biron | June 30, 2004 | June 30, 2013 | 15th | UNA | Re-elected in 2010. | 1987–present Anilao, Banate, Barotac Nuevo, Dingle, Dueñas, Dumangas, Passi, San Enrique |
| 16 | | Hernan G. Biron Jr. | June 30, 2013 | June 30, 2016 | 16th | UNA | Elected in 2013. | 1987–present Anilao, Banate, Barotac Nuevo, Dingle, Dueñas, Dumangas, Passi, San Enrique |
| (15) | | Ferjenel Biron | June 30, 2016 | June 30, 2019 | 17th | Nacionalista | Elected in 2016. | 1987–present Anilao, Banate, Barotac Nuevo, Dingle, Dueñas, Dumangas, Passi, San Enrique |
| 17 | | Braeden John Q. Biron | June 30, 2019 | June 30, 2022 | 18th | Nacionalista | Elected in 2019. | 1987–present Anilao, Banate, Barotac Nuevo, Dingle, Dueñas, Dumangas, Passi, San Enrique |
| (15) | | Ferjenel Biron | June 30, 2022 | Incumbent | 19th | Nacionalista | Elected in 2022. | 1987–present Anilao, Banate, Barotac Nuevo, Dingle, Dueñas, Dumangas, Passi, San Enrique |
| (15) | | Ferjenel Biron | June 30, 2022 | Incumbent | 20th | Nacionalista | Re-elected in 2025. | 1987–present Anilao, Banate, Barotac Nuevo, Dingle, Dueñas, Dumangas, Passi, San Enrique |

== Election results ==
=== 2019 ===
2019 Philippine House of Representatives elections
| Party | Candidate | Votes | % |
|---|---|---|---|
| Nacionalista | Braeden John Biron | 128,935 | |
| PDP–Laban | Marven Daquilanea | 36,347 | |
| PDDS | Erlina Barte | 1,848 | |
| Invalid or blank votes | | | |
| Total votes | | 167,130 | |

=== 2016 ===
2016 Philippine House of Representatives elections
| Party | Candidate | Votes | % |
|---|---|---|---|
| NUP | Ferjenel Biron | 108,394 | |
| Independent | Rita Monfort-Bautista | 63,465 | |
| Independent | Felicito Dolar Jr. | 609 | |
| Invalid or blank votes | | 16,182 | |
| Total votes | | 188,650 | |

=== 2013 ===
2013 Philippine House of Representatives elections
| Party | Candidate | Votes | % |
|---|---|---|---|
| UNA | Hernan Biron Jr. | 73,528 | 46.14 |
| Liberal | Niel Tupas Sr. | 70,834 | 44.45 |
| Margin of victory | | 2,694 | 1.69% |
| Invalid or blank votes | | 15,000 | 9.41 |
| Total votes | | 159,362 | 100.00 |
| UNA hold | | | |

=== 2010 ===
2010 Philippine House of Representatives elections
| Party | Candidate | Votes | % |
|---|---|---|---|
| Nacionalista | Ferjenel Biron | 106,303 | 64.60 |
| Liberal | Neil Tupas Sr. | 58,261 | 35.40 |
| Valid ballots | | 165,564 | 96.72 |
| Invalid or blank votes | | 5,576 | 3.28 |
| Total votes | | 170,140 | 100.00 |
| Nacionalista hold | | | |

== See also ==
- Legislative districts of Iloilo
