= Barotac Nuevo =

Municipality in Iloilo, Philippines

- Municipality
- Municipality of Barotac Nuevo
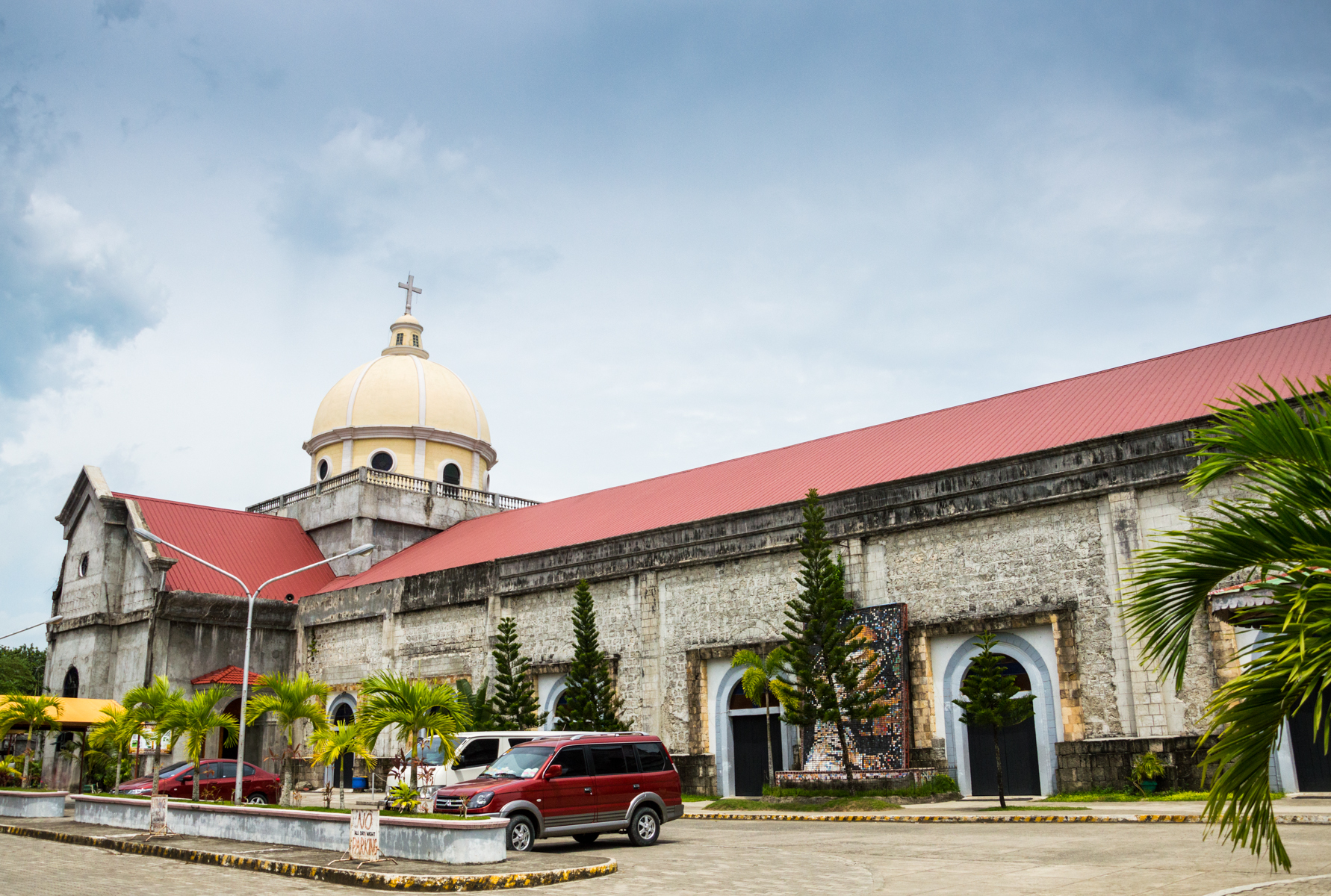
- Barotac Nuevo Church

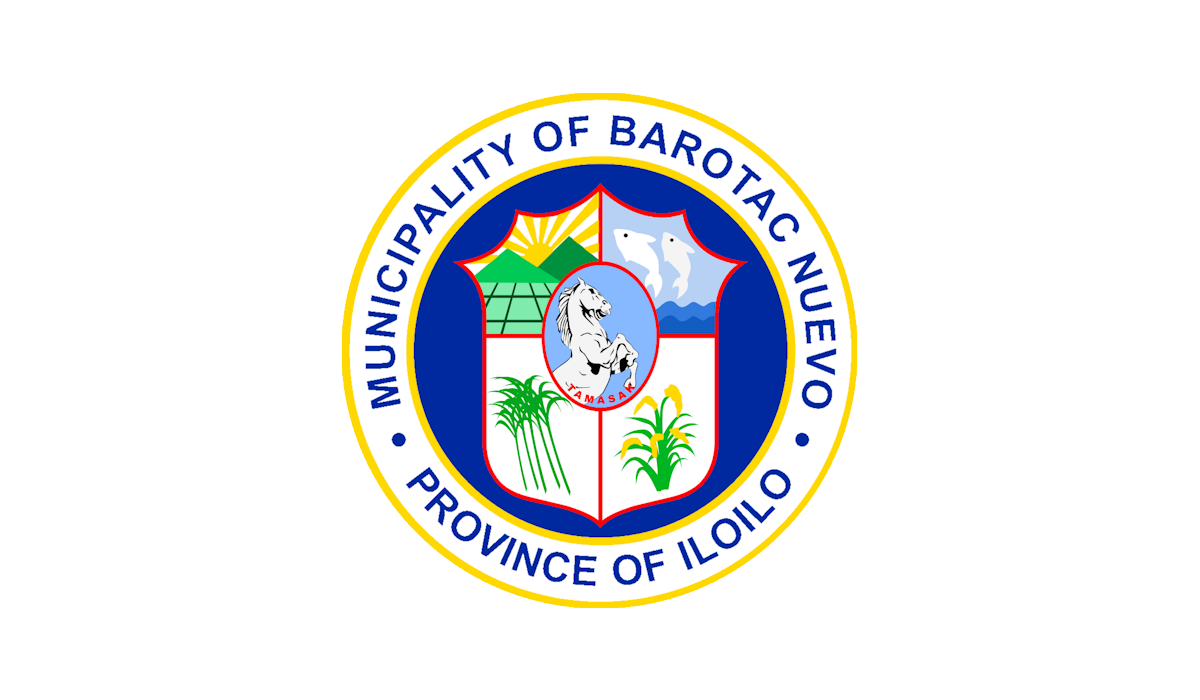
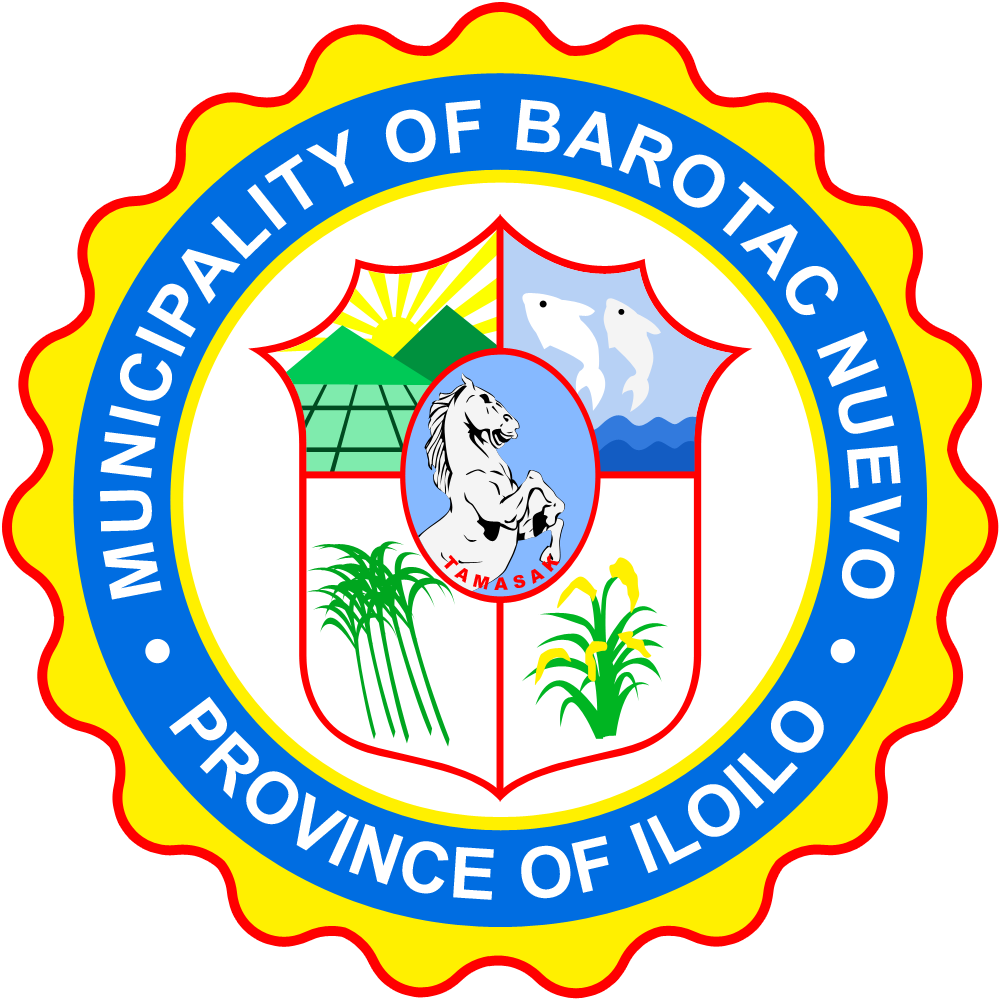
- Flag Seal
- Nickname: Football Capital of the Philippines
- Interactive map of Barotac Nuevo
- Location within the Philippines
- Coordinates: 10°54′N 122°42′E
- Country: Philippines
- Region: Western Visayas
- Province: Iloilo
- District: 4th district
- Barangays: 29 (see Barangays)

Government
  - Type: Sangguniang Bayan
  - Mayor: Bryant Paul Q. Biron (Nacionalista)
  - Vice Mayor: Hernan G. Biron, Jr. (Nacionalista)
  - Representative: Ferjenel G. Biron (Nacionalista)
  - Municipal Council: Members: George P. Demaisip (Nacionalista); Jose Rex S. Pilador (Nacionalista); Michael John B. Siatong (Nacionalista); Raph John C. Oso (Nacionalista); Leonorico B. Bearnod, Jr. (Nacionalista); Ernesto T. Brillantes, Jr. (Nacionalista); Jessie S. Sazon (Nacionalista); Rhoan Loueige B. Belgira (Nacionalista); Noel C. Brillantes ^{‡}; Rica B. Pama ^{◌}; ‡ ex officio ABC president; ◌ ex officio SK chairman
  - Electorate: 39,162 voters (2025)

Area
  - Total: 94.49 km^{2} (36.48 sq mi)
- Elevation: 19 m (62 ft)
- Highest elevation: 357 m (1,171 ft)
- Lowest elevation: 0 m (0 ft)

Population (2024 census)
  - Total: 59,184
  - Density: 626.4/km^{2} (1,622/sq mi)
  - Households: 14,251

Economy
  - Income class: 1st municipal income class
  - Poverty incidence: 15.58% (2023)
  - Revenue: ₱ 257.8 million (2024)
  - Assets: ₱ 1,079 million (2024)
  - Expenditure: ₱ 185.1 million (2024)
  - Liabilities: ₱ 268.9 million (2024)

Service provider
  - Electricity: Iloilo 2 Electric Cooperative (ILECO 2)
- Time zone: UTC+8 (PST)
- ZIP code: 5007
- PSGC: 063007000
- IDD : area code: +63 (0)33
- Native languages: Hiligaynon; Tagalog
- Website: www.barotacnuevo.gov.ph

Barotac Nuevo, officially the Municipality of Barotac Nuevo (Hiligaynon: Banwa sang Barotac Nuevo, Tagalog: Bayan ng Barotac Nuevo), is a municipality in the province of Iloilo, Philippines. According to the 2024 census, it has a population of 59,184 people.

The town is officially known as the Football Capital of the Philippines.

== History ==
According to local folklore, the barrio of Malutac in Dumangas was famous for its well-bred horses. There was once a horse called Tamasak, a pure white stallion in the stead of one Don Simon Protacio. Don Protacio was offered to sell the horse to Manuel Gonzales de Aguilar, the governor-general of the Philippines at that time whose white horse previously died. Don Protacio adamantly refused to sell his horse which led to Gonzales de Aguilar personally visiting Don Protacio's compound in order to persuade him to do so. After a long negotiation, they came to a truce wherein Tamasak will be given to the governor-general in exchange for Malutac to be made into a town. When the barrio was eventually separated from Dumangas and became a town, it was renamed into Barotac Nuevo.

The name "Barotac" combines the Spanish word baro, meaning mud, with the second syllable of the Hiligaynon word lutac, which also means mud. The term Nuevo meaning "new," was added to distinguish it from Barotac Viejo, located 26 kilometres (16 mi) to the north.

Barotac Nuevo is a small town with an economy centered on fishing and agriculture. Its town church was built by Spanish Roman Catholic missionaries in the 16th century.

== Geography ==
Barotac Nuevo is 31 kilometres (19 mi) from the provincial capital Iloilo City, 9 kilometres (5.6 mi) from Pototan, and 8 kilometres (5.0 mi) from Dumangas. The town is bordered by Pototan to the west, Dingle to the north-west, Anilao to the north-east, and Dumangas to the south.

=== Barangays ===
Barotac Nuevo is politically subdivided into 29 barangays: Each barangay consists of puroks and some have sitios.

- Acuit
- Agcuyawan Calsada
- Agcuyawan Pulo
- Bagongbong
- Baras
- Bungca
- Cabilauan
- Cruz
- Guintas
- Igbong
- Ilaud Poblacion
- Ilaya Poblacion
- Jalaud
- Lagubang
- Lanas
- Lico-an
- Linao
- Monpon
- Palaciawan
- Patag
- Salihid
- So-ol
- Sohoton
- Tabuc-Suba
- Tabucan
- Talisay
- Tinorian
- Tiwi
- Tubungan

=== Climate ===
Climate data for Barotac Nuevo, Iloilo
Month	Jan	Feb	Mar	Apr	May	Jun	Jul	Aug	Sep	Oct	Nov	Dec	Year
Mean daily maximum °C (°F)	28 (82)	29 (84)	30 (86)	32 (90)	32 (90)	31 (88)	30 (86)	29 (84)	29 (84)	29 (84)	29 (84)	28 (82)	30 (85)
Mean daily minimum °C (°F)	23 (73)	23 (73)	23 (73)	24 (75)	25 (77)	25 (77)	25 (77)	24 (75)	24 (75)	24 (75)	24 (75)	23 (73)	24 (75)
Average precipitation mm (inches)	57 (2.2)	37 (1.5)	41 (1.6)	42 (1.7)	98 (3.9)	155 (6.1)	187 (7.4)	162 (6.4)	179 (7.0)	188 (7.4)	114 (4.5)	78 (3.1)	1,338 (52.8)
Average rainy days	12.0	7.7	9.2	10.2	19.5	24.6	26.9	25.1	25.5	25.2	18.0	13.0	216.9
Source: Meteoblue (Use with caution: this is modeled/calculated data, not measured locally.)

== Demographics ==
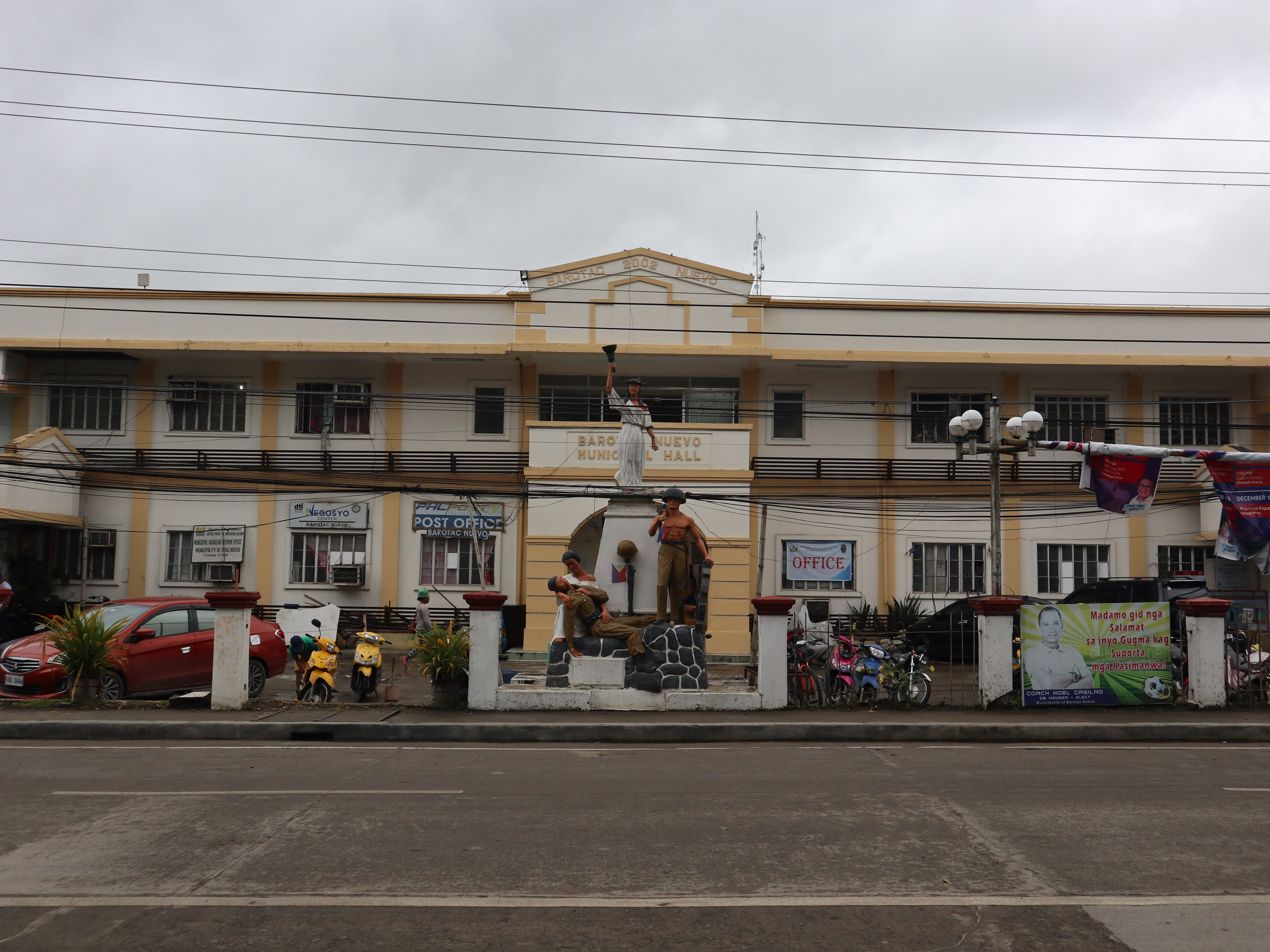
Barotac Nuevo Municipal Hall

Population census of Barotac Nuevo
Year	Pop.	±% p.a.
1903	9,904	—
1918	13,299	+1.98%
1939	20,572	+2.10%
1948	21,860	+0.68%
1960	23,164	+0.48%
1970	30,131	+2.66%
1975	33,443	+2.11%
1980	34,276	+0.49%
1990	39,757	+1.49%
1995	40,968	+0.56%
2000	45,804	+2.42%
2007	49,515	+1.08%
2010	51,867	+1.70%
2015	54,146	+0.82%
2020	58,176	+1.52%
2024	59,184	+0.41%
Source: Philippine Statistics Authority

In the 2024 census, the population of Barotac Nuevo was 59,184 people, with a density of 630 inhabitants per square kilometre or 1,600 inhabitants per square mile.

=== Language ===
The primary language spoken in Barotac Nuevo is Hiligaynon.

=== Religion ===
The population is predominantly Roman Catholic.

== Economy ==
Poverty incidence of Barotac Nuevo (%)

Source: Philippine Statistics Authority

The town's agricultural output includes rice, sugar cane, and spinach. Marine products such as milkfish and tilapia are harvested from local fisheries. There are usually three annual rice harvests, depending on the season.

== Sports ==
Football is the most popular sport in Barotac Nuevo which is usually dubbed as the football capital town of the Philippines. A football field is present in the town plaza. Every summer season, a local football league is held. Stallion F.C., now named Stallion Laguna F.C. of the Philippines Football League, was founded in Barotac Nuevo. There is only one basketball court in town and is rarely used.

Football was introduced in the town in the 1920s by the Monfort brothers.

== Telecommunications ==
Smart Communications has a cell site in the middle of the town providing voice, texting and data services over the GSM network. Smart is likewise providing 4G LTE, 3G and HSPA services. SmartBRO is also available for fixed internet service. There are also cell sites located at Barangay Tiwi.

== Education ==
The Barotac Nuevo Schools District Office governs all educational institutions within the municipality. It oversees the management and operations of all private and public, from primary to secondary schools.

Primary and elementary schools

- Acuit Elementary School
- Agcuyawan Pulo Elementary School
- Agcuyawan Calsada Elementary School
- Bagongbong A Primary School
- Bagongbong B Elementary School
- Baras Elementary School
- Barotac Nuevo Central Elementary School
- Barotac Nuevo Evangelical School
- Cabilauan Elementary School
- Guintas Elementary School
- Igbong Primary School
- Iloilo Christian School
- Jalaud Elementary School
- Juan F. Siochi Elementary School
- Lanas Elementary School
- Lico-an Elementary School
- Linao-Cruz Elementary School
- Monpon Elementary School
- Palaciawan Elementary School
- Patag Elementary School
- Salihid Elementary School
- Sohoton Elementary School
- So-ol Elementary School
- St. Paul School
- Tabucan Elementary School
- Talisay Elementary School
- Tinorian Elementary School
- Tiwi Elementary School
- Tubungan Primary School
- Victory Child Learning Center

Secondary schools

- Barotac Nuevo National Comprehensive High School
- Barotac Nuevo National Comprehensive High School (Tiwi Annex)
- Iloilo State College of Fisheries-Fisheries and Marine Science High School
- Jose Monfort National Science High School
- Salihid National High School

== Notable personalities ==
- Myrtle Sarrosa, Pinoy Big Brother: Teen Edition 4 Big Winner
- Chieffy Caligdong, former Philippines National Football Team player
- Ian Araneta, former Philippines National Football Team player
- Jovin Bedic, former Philippines National Football Team player
- Elmer Bedia, former Philippines National Football Team player, PFF Mr. Football
- Ferjenel Biron, politician and physician
