= Ricardo Ladrido =

Filipino dentist and politician

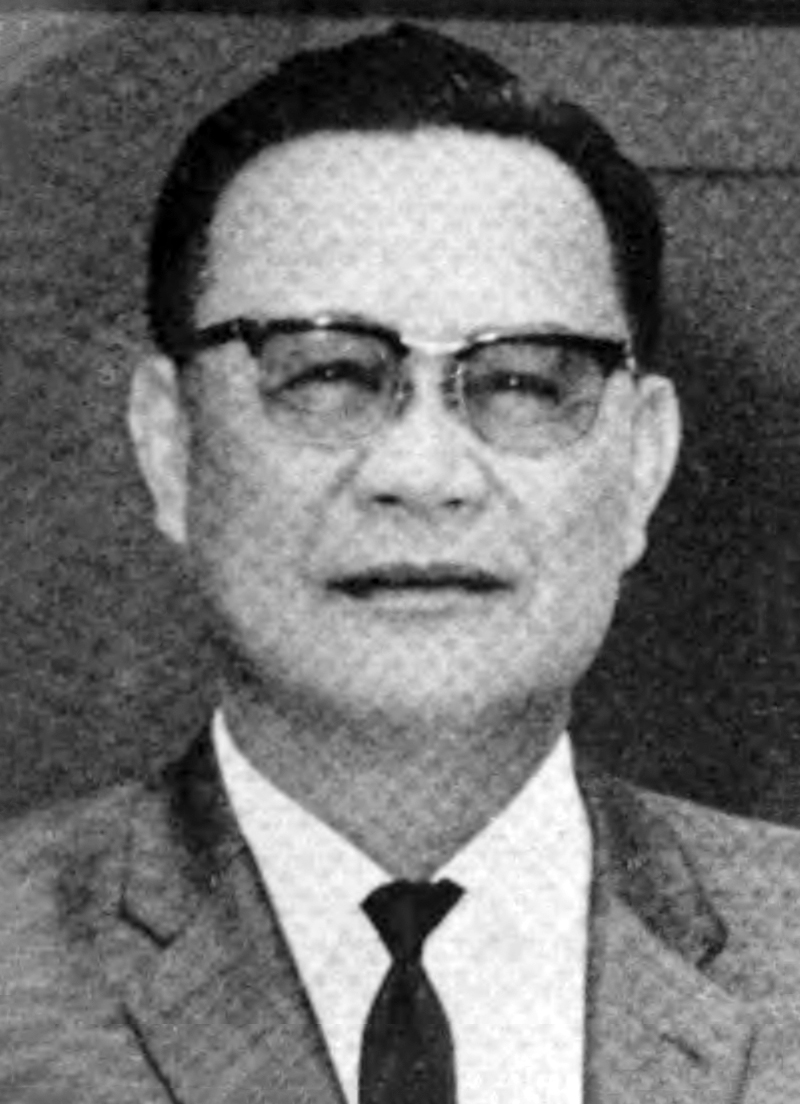
- Ladrido's official portrait during the 6th Congress

Member of the Philippine House of Representatives from Iloilo's 4th district
- In office December 30, 1949 – December 30, 1969
- Preceded by: Gaudencio Demaisip
- Succeeded by: Mariano Peñaflorida

Personal details
- Born: May 22, 1907 Lambunao, Iloilo, Philippine Islands
- Party: Liberal (1965–1969)
- Other political affiliations: Nacionalista (1949–1953; 1957–1965); Democratic (1953–1957)
- Spouse: Leonor Bolivar Perenne
- Children: 3
- Education: Philippine Dental College

Ricardo Yap Ladrido (May 22, 1907 – after 1969) was a Filipino dental surgeon and politician who served as the representative for Iloilo's 4th congressional district in the Philippine House of Representatives from 1949 until 1969.

== Early life and education ==
Ricardo Yap Ladrido was born on May 22, 1907, in Lambunao, Iloilo, to municipal president Eugenio Ladrido and businesswoman Santiaga Yap. He graduated from the Lambunao Elementary School as a valedictorian, and later went to Iloilo High School where he served as president of Lambunao student organizations. In 1930, he earned his dentistry degree as a magna cum laude in the Philippine Dental College and passed the dental board examinations the same year.

== Early career ==
Ladrido began his dental practice in Iloilo City and Pototan. From 1930 to 1939, he served three terms as a municipal councilor of Lambunao.

== House of Representatives ==
In 1949, Ladrido was encouraged by his wife's first cousin, provincial governor Mariano Peñaflorida, to run for the House of Representatives seat for Iloilo's 4th congressional district. He won under the Nacionalista Party. Upon filing his certificate of candidacy, he wrote to the Philippine Dental Association, of which he was an active member and vice president for the Visayas:

"I am simply complying with the desire and longings of the Philippine Dental Association to be represented by a member of the Association in the august halls of the Philippine Congress, aside from the fact that I consider it a challenge to my patriotism and sense of public service."

Ladrido was re-elected to four more terms: in 1953 under the Democratic Party, and in 1957, 1961, and 1965 after rejoining the Nacionalista Party. Throughout the 2nd to 6th Congresses, he served as chairman of the House Committee on Health. During his chairmanship, the budget for the health sector increased from ₱10,281,850 in 1950 to ₱111,231,158 in 1963–1964 and ₱120,233,531 in fiscal year 1966. He also authored Republic Act No. 3814, which created the Bureau of Dental Health Service. He further secured the restoration of dental commissions in the Armed Forces to the rank of first lieutenant and salary increases for military surgeons, doctors, dentists, and nurses. He also sponsored measures providing for the establishment of new government general, maternity, and emergency hospitals, as well as rural health clinics, chest centers, and other medical institutions.

== Personal life ==
Ladrido also worked as a farmer. He was married to Leonor Bolivar Perenne, with whom he had three children. He was awarded the Pro Ecclesia et Pontifice Cross by Pope John XXIII for his meritorious work in support of the Catholic Church and charitable institutions. In 1964, he was also made an honorary citizen of Little Rock, Arkansas.

== Electoral history ==
Electoral history of Ricardo Ladrido
Year	Office	Party	Votes received				Result
Year	Office	Party	Total	%	P.	Swing	Result
1949	Representative (Iloilo–4th)	Nacionalista	20,987	—N/a	1st	—N/a	Won
1953	Representative (Iloilo–4th)	Democratic	14,127	47.52%	1st	—N/a	Won
1957	Representative (Iloilo–4th)	Nacionalista	—N/a	—N/a	1st	—N/a	Won
1961	Representative (Iloilo–4th)	Nacionalista	—N/a	—N/a	1st	—N/a	Won
1965	Representative (Iloilo–4th)	Liberal	26,752	53.82%	1st	—N/a	Won

== Honors ==
- Vatican City: Pro Ecclesia et Pontifice

House of Representatives of the Philippines
Preceded by Gaudencio Demaisip	Member of the Philippine House of Representatives for Iloilo's 4th district 1949–1969	Succeeded by Mariano Peñaflorida
