= Anilao, Iloilo =

Municipality in Iloilo, Philippines

Anilao
- Municipality
- Municipality of Anilao
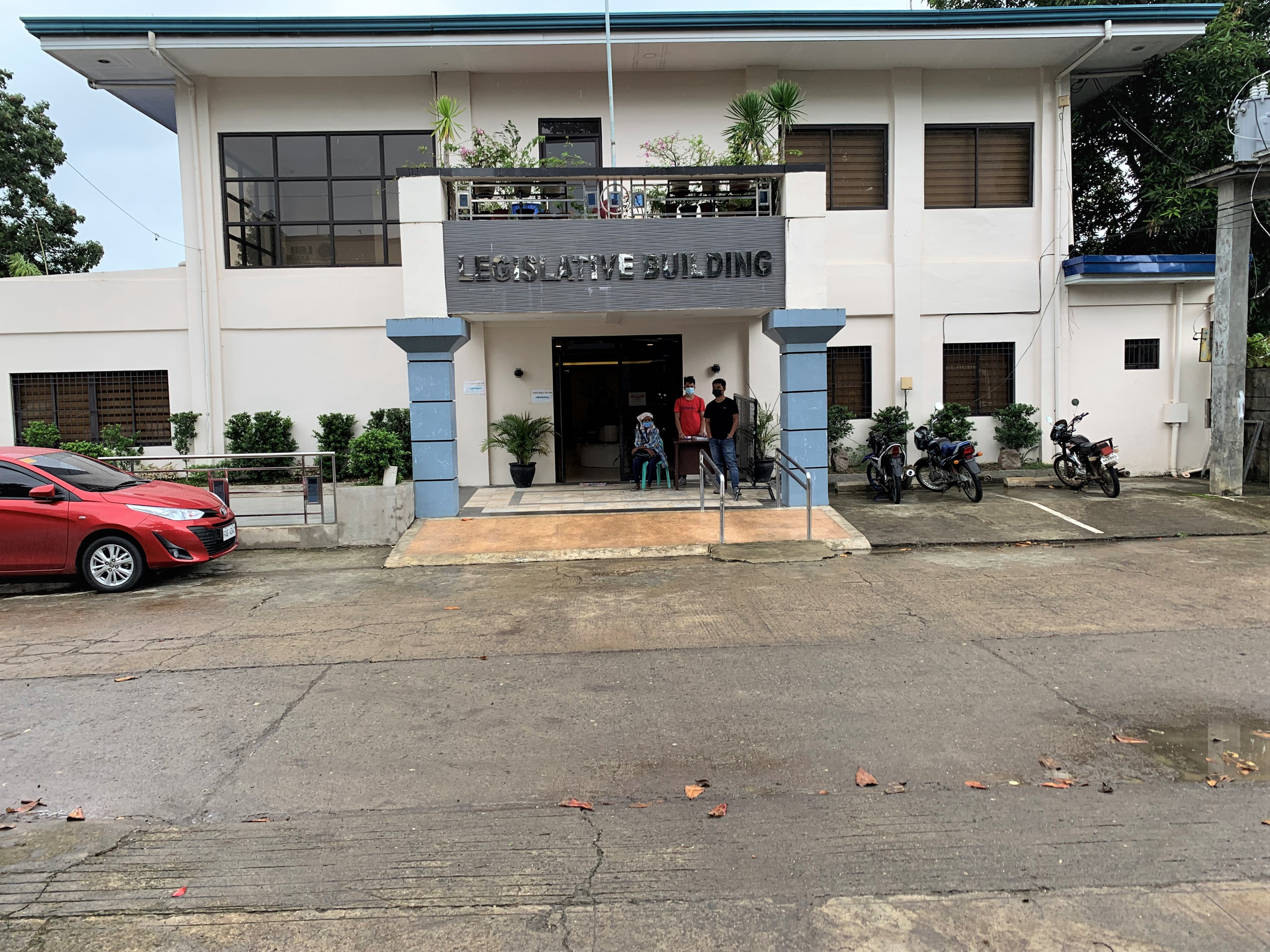
- Anilao Municipal Legislative Building

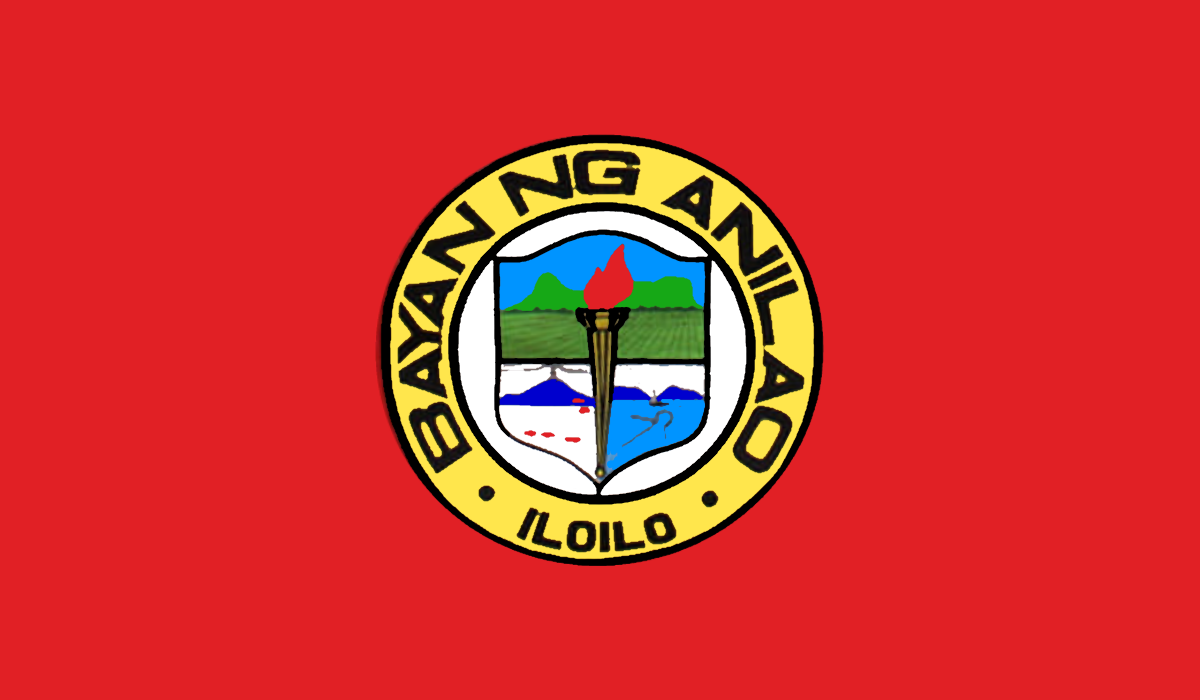
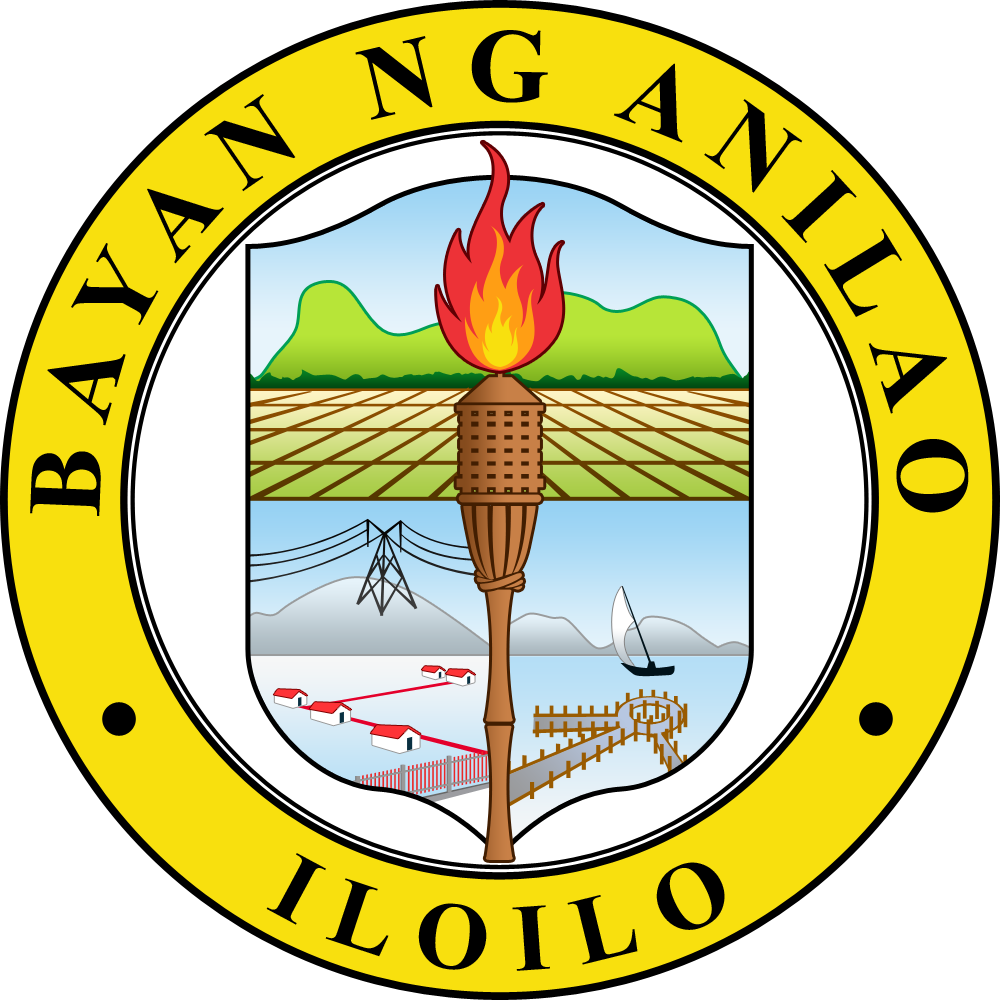
- Flag Seal

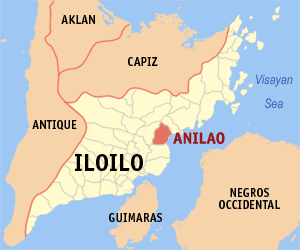
- Map of Iloilo with Anilao highlighted
- Interactive map of Anilao
- Location within the Philippines
- Coordinates: 10°58′43″N 122°45′11″E
- Country: Philippines
- Region: Western Visayas
- Province: Iloilo
- District: 4th district
- Barangays: 21 (see Barangays)

Government
  - Type: Sangguniang Bayan
  - Mayor: Ma. Teresa F. Debuque (Nacionalista)
  - Vice Mayor: Lyka Joy A. Debuque (Nacionalista)
  - Representative: Ferjenel G. Biron (Nacionalista)
  - Municipal Council: Members: Marina C. Buyco (Nacionalista); Eduardo P. Jorque, Jr. (Nacionalista); Isidro B. Arandilla, II (Nacionalista); Emma Christine E. Buyco (Nacionalista); Alex D. Araño (Nacionalista); Maxson Matthew D. Mana-ay (Nacionalista); Alger F. Lamprea (Nacionalista); Regina S. Gilmero (Nacionalista); Amalia Victoria F. Debuque ^{‡}; Eduardo C. Jorque III ^{◌}; ‡ ex officio ABC president; ◌ ex officio SK chairman
  - Electorate: 19,877 voters (2025)

Area
  - Total: 100.31 km^{2} (38.73 sq mi)
- Elevation: 49 m (161 ft)
- Highest elevation: 577 m (1,893 ft)
- Lowest elevation: 0 m (0 ft)

Population (2024 census)
  - Total: 30,612
  - Density: 305.17/km^{2} (790.40/sq mi)
  - Households: 7,650

Economy
  - Income class: 3rd municipal income class
  - Poverty incidence: 21.12% (2023)
  - Revenue: ₱ 159.5 million (2024)
  - Assets: ₱ 874.1 million (2024)
  - Expenditure: ₱ 63.09 million (2024)
  - Liabilities: ₱ 181.2 million (2024)

Service provider
  - Electricity: Iloilo 3 Electric Cooperative (ILECO 3)
- Time zone: UTC+8 (PST)
- ZIP code: 5009
- PSGC: 063003000
- IDD : area code: +63 (0)33
- Native languages: Hiligaynon; Ati; Tagalog
- Website: www.anilao.gov.ph

Anilao, officially the Municipality of Anilao (Hiligaynon: Banwa sang Anilao; Ati: Banwa ki Anilao; Kinaray-a: Banwa kang Anilao; Tagalog: Bayan ng Anilao), is a 3rd class municipality in the province of Iloilo, Philippines. According to the 2024 census, it has a population of 30,612 people.

== Geography ==
Anilao is 42 kilometres (26 mi) from Iloilo City.

=== Barangays ===
Anilao is politically subdivided into 21 barangays. Each barangay consists of puroks and some have sitios.

- Agbatuan
- Badiang
- Balabag
- Balunos
- Cag-an
- Camiros
- Sambag Culob
- Dangula-an
- Guipis
- Manganese
- Medina
- Mostro
- Palaypay
- Pantalan
- Poblacion
- San Carlos
- San Juan Crisostomo
- Santa Rita
- Santo Rosario
- Serallo
- Vista Alegre

=== Climate ===
Climate data for Anilao, Iloilo
| Month | Jan | Feb | Mar | Apr | May | Jun | Jul | Aug | Sep | Oct | Nov | Dec | Year |
|---|---|---|---|---|---|---|---|---|---|---|---|---|---|
| Mean daily maximum °C (°F) | 28 (82) | 29 (84) | 30 (86) | 31 (88) | 31 (88) | 30 (86) | 29 (84) | 29 (84) | 29 (84) | 29 (84) | 29 (84) | 28 (82) | 29 (85) |
| Mean daily minimum °C (°F) | 21 (70) | 21 (70) | 22 (72) | 23 (73) | 25 (77) | 25 (77) | 25 (77) | 25 (77) | 25 (77) | 24 (75) | 23 (73) | 22 (72) | 23 (74) |
| Average precipitation mm (inches) | 31 (1.2) | 20 (0.8) | 25 (1.0) | 39 (1.5) | 152 (6.0) | 269 (10.6) | 314 (12.4) | 285 (11.2) | 303 (11.9) | 208 (8.2) | 95 (3.7) | 70 (2.8) | 1,811 (71.3) |
| Average rainy days | 9.5 | 7.1 | 9.0 | 11.3 | 21.0 | 25.7 | 28.1 | 26.5 | 27.3 | 24.6 | 16.5 | 12.1 | 218.7 |
Source: Meteoblue (Use with caution: this is modeled/calculated data, not measured locally.)

== Demographics ==
Population census of Anilao
| Year | Pop. | ±% p.a. |
|---|---|---|
| 1903 | 1,911 | — |
| 1948 | 8,518 | +3.38% |
| 1960 | 10,153 | +1.47% |
| 1970 | 12,722 | +2.28% |
| 1975 | 14,067 | +2.04% |
| 1980 | 15,782 | +2.33% |
| 1990 | 19,560 | +2.17% |
| 1995 | 20,711 | +1.08% |
| 2000 | 22,170 | +1.47% |
| 2007 | 23,465 | +0.79% |
| 2010 | 27,486 | +5.92% |
| 2015 | 28,684 | +0.82% |
| 2020 | 30,520 | +1.31% |
| 2024 | 30,612 | +0.07% |
Source: Philippine Statistics Authority

In the 2024 census, the population of Anilao, Iloilo, was 30,612 people, with a density of 310 inhabitants per square kilometre or 800 inhabitants per square mile.

== Economy ==
Poverty incidence of Anilao

Source: Philippine Statistics Authority

=== One Town One Product ===
Anilao markets ginamos under the One Town One Product (OTOP) program.

== Education ==
The Anilao Schools District Office governs all educational institutions within the municipality. It oversees the management and operations of all private and public, from primary to secondary schools.

Primary and elementary schools

- Aglay-ao Primary School
- Anilao Central Elementary School
- Apurillo Memorial School
- Arandilla Memorial Elementary School
- Balabag Elementary School
- Balunos Elementary School
- Cag-an Elementary School
- Camiros Elementary School
- Dangula-an Elementary School
- Dr. Jose M. Facultad Elementary School
- Iloilo School for Advancement
- Manganese Elementary School
- Medina Elementary School
- Mostro Elementary School
- Palaypay Elementary School
- Santiago Arandilla Memorial School

Secondary schools

- Agbatuan Integrated School
- Anilao National High School
- Camiros National High School
- Guipis Integrated School
- Mostro National High School
- San Carlos Integrated School
