= Tipolo =

Tipolo may refer to the following places in the Philippines:

- Tipolo, a barangay in the city of Mandaue
- Tipolo, a barangay in the municipality of Dueñas, Iloilo
- Tipolo, a barangay in the municipality of Mina, Iloilo
- Tipolo, a barangay in the municipality of Ubay, Bohol
- Tipolo, a barangay in the municipality of Kapatagan, Lanao del Norte
- Tipolo, a barangay in the municipality of Plaridel, Misamis Occidental
