= Mina, Iloilo =

Municipality in Iloilo, Philippines

Mina
- Municipality
- Municipality of Mina
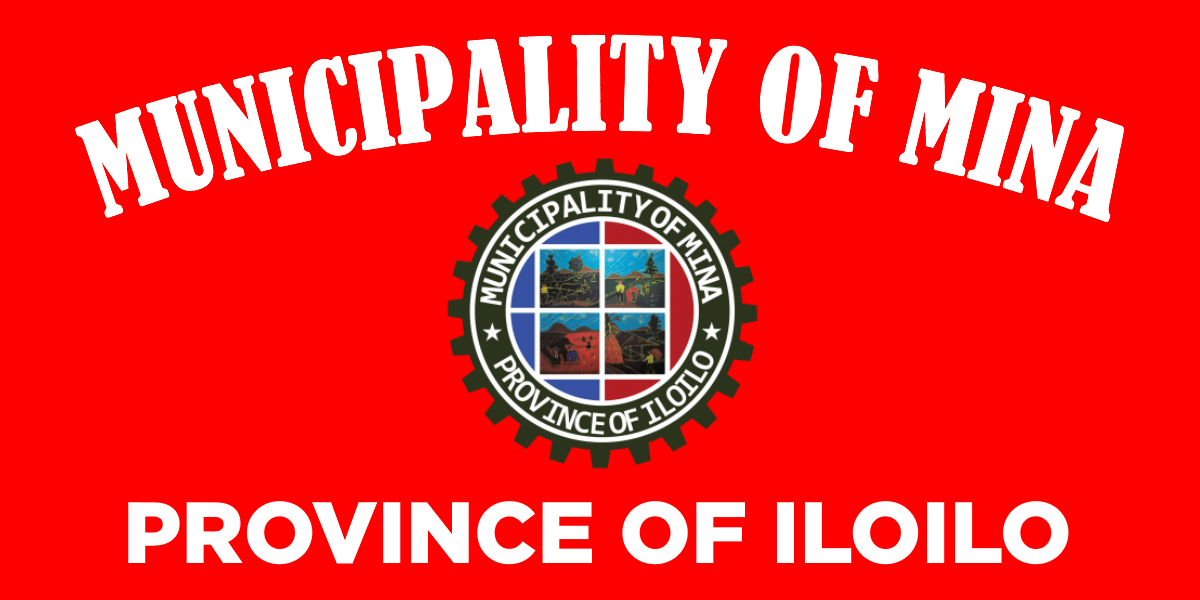
- Flag

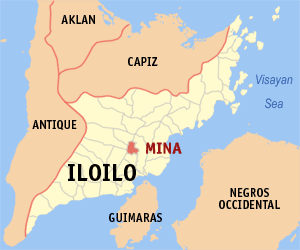
- Map of Iloilo with Mina highlighted
- Interactive map of Mina
- Location within the Philippines
- Coordinates: 10°56′N 122°35′E
- Country: Philippines
- Region: Western Visayas
- Province: Iloilo
- District: 3rd district
- Founded: July 1, 1870
- Barangays: 22 (see Barangays)

Government
  - Type: Sangguniang Bayan
  - Mayor: Rey P. Grabato (PFP)
  - Vice Mayor: John Michael T. Defensor (PFP)
  - Representative: Lorenz R. Defensor (NUP)
  - Municipal Council: Members: Ana Lourdes B. Espiritu (PFP); Ireneo D. Pecina (Ind); Denise V. Ventilacion (PFP); Luda G. Ahumada (PFP); Felne P. Novo (Ind); Juanito D. Grabato, Jr. (PFP); Loise Robin D. Zuniega (Ind); Marilou Q. Porquez (PFP); Felipe E. Allaga ^{‡}; Kelly Florence B. Brillo ^{◌}; ‡ ex officio ABC president; ◌ ex officio SK chairman
  - Electorate: 15,592 voters (2025)

Area
  - Total: 43.40 km^{2} (16.76 sq mi)
- Elevation: 42 m (138 ft)
- Highest elevation: 105 m (344 ft)
- Lowest elevation: 17 m (56 ft)

Population (2024 census)
  - Total: 24,145
  - Density: 556.3/km^{2} (1,441/sq mi)
  - Households: 5,774

Economy
  - Income class: 4th municipal income class
  - Poverty incidence: 15.14% (2023)
  - Revenue: ₱ 132 million (2024)
  - Assets: ₱ 637.7 million (2024)
  - Expenditure: ₱ 139.9 million (2024)
  - Liabilities: ₱ 200.9 million (2024)

Service provider
  - Electricity: Iloilo 2 Electric Cooperative (ILECO 2)
- Time zone: UTC+8 (PST)
- ZIP code: 5032
- PSGC: 063031000
- IDD : area code: +63 (0)33
- Native languages: Karay-a; Hiligaynon; Ati; Tagalog
- Website: www.mina.gov.ph

Mina, officially the Municipality of Mina (Kinaray-a: Banwa kang Mina; Hiligaynon: Banwa sang Mina, Tagalog: Bayan ng Mina), is a 4th class municipality in the province of Iloilo, Philippines. According to the 2024 census, it has a population of 24,145 people.

== History ==
=== Spanish colonization (1521–1898) ===
Prior to 1870, Mina was formerly named Barrio Mantugaui under the jurisdiction of Pototan. On June 20, 1864, a league of influential citizens and inhabitants of this Barrio, officially pleaded to the Quartermaster General of the Visayas to elevate this barrio into a new town independent of its matrix of Pototan to be named “Pueblo de Molto”. The reasons why there was a petition to elevate said barrio into a pueblo, were due to: (1) great distance between the town and the barrio; (2) during those times, the residents of the said barrio had difficulty travelling to Pototan when they want to hear mass on required days; (3) when some barrio folks fell ill due to some pestilence and eventually died without receiving the Sacrament of Extreme Unction for the good of their souls. For a predominantly-Catholic inhabitants of this barrio, receiving and getting blessed with the sacraments as taught by the church, were important. (4) Another case in point was those women who suffered complications and died during childbirth had no chance of receiving the final sacrament, and (5) their infants often died without being baptized. It was for these reasons, that the leaders sought his approval praying that their request would be granted. July 30, 1864 - The Parish Priest and the Principales of Pototan endorsed to the Political-Military Government of Iloilo the required sketch and lists of more than a thousand tax payers and sixteen Cabezas de Barangay, informing the need of elevating Barrio Mantugaui into a town. Likewise to also elevate this petition to the superior knowledge of the Governor General of the Philippines for his royal resolution/decision.

There were so many disputes that had happened in the creation of this town. Arguments as to the other barrios to be included as part of Molto, as well as the boundaries and the “tributos” taxpayers, have become the major contention. Barrio Paranginan el Maya was merged to Talarocan now Tolarucan, to become part of Molto. A dispute between the Municipalities of Pototan and Janiuay over the jurisdiction of Talarocan resulted to the delay of elevating this barrio into a town. On January 20, 1868, a decree ordered by then the Gobernador Politico Militar de Visayas, contained an assignment which was delegated to the Captain of the Police Force in this District, Don Evaristo Fernandez, who conducted the survey of the boundaries concerned. Upon completion of the survey, the recommendation regarding the boundary between Mantugaui and Janiuay was objected by Fr. Miguel Claro of Janiuay Parish, hence the delay occurred for its approval. On March 30, 1869, the Bishop of Jaro appointed Don Juan Manzano y Vazques, the lawyer of this Province and was designated to form a committee to establish the official boundaries for the creation of a new town to be named “Pueblo de Molto”. Together with him in the said committee were the Reverend Parish Priests of Pototan and Janiuay and with the chiefs of the Barrio Mantugaui, they also handled the case filed regarding the objection of the Parish Priest of Janiuay. Another important task of this committee was to establish the site where the new town of Molto and the barrios which should be part of it should be situated and indicated as well as the land for the public buildings.

On April 5, 1870, the final report of the boundaries for “Pueblo de Molto” was submitted to the Political Military Governor of the District by the said committee. On July 1, 1870, a Superior Decree issued by the Superior Government of General Carlos Ma. De la Torre to establish the demarcation and markings of the new town and named it into “Pueblo de Mina” instead of “Pueblo de Molto”. No parish priest yet was assigned at that time because some of the requirements imposed for the creation of a new parish like the construction of the Church, Parish House for the priest, Convent School, Court, Municipio, were not fully complied yet. On July 30, 1873, when all these terms and conditions were accomplished, a decree was issued making the new town of Mina as a full- fledged parish as approved by the Government of the Republic. The parish, which was created through the Bishop of Jaro appointed an Augustinian Priest, Father Tiburcio Casbresana, a Spaniard, to become the first parish priest in the new town of Mina. The Parish of Mina was given an official title of “Nuestra Sra. Del Pilar” or “Our Lady of the Pillar”.

=== American colonization (1900–1946) ===
In 1903, by virtue of Act No. 719, an Act reducing the fifty-one municipalities of the province of Iloilo to seventeen, Mina, alongside the town of Dingle, was annexed to Pototan under the Americans, the latter being larger in population and was economically more prosperous. Nonetheless, through the efforts of then Iloilo 4th District Assemblyman Adriano Hernández y Dayot, the separation of Dingle from Pototan was given impetus in 1907. Mina, however, would remain with Pototan until their eventual separation in 1968 by virtue of Republic Act No. 5442. However, the townsfolk of Mina continued to be under the parish of Our Lady of the Pillar during this interlude.

=== World War II and after ===
During World War II, the presence of the Japanese occupation was also felt within Mina, hence, for three years, the Chapel in Barangay Abat, Mina, became the location of the parish of Mina, where the feast day of Our Lady of the Pillar on October 12, was celebrated with a mass each year. Immediately after liberation, the Parish went back to its original location in the town plaza.

In 1947, the Parish Priest, having observed that the economic life of the people in the parish was pitifully difficult, transferred the celebration of the religious fiesta on December 30 from October 12. The purpose of the change was to afford the parishioners the chance to have a decent and festive celebration. For two years, the religious activities and festivities were celebrated on December 30 after which the feast day was moved back to its original date, simultaneously with the celebration of Spain where the feast of the Lady of the Pillar was originated. Thus, since then, the town of Mina celebrates the religious festival every 12 October annually.

A group of local leaders residing in Mina made a petition to separate Mina as an independent town from Pototan. On October 1, 1964, then President Diosdado Macapagal signed Executive Order No. 106 creating the Municipality of Mina. Mina's status as a municipality became controversial. A complaint filed by then Senator Emmanuel Pelaez reached the Supreme Court. It had to do with the official acts of President Diosdado Macapagal issuing Executive Order for the creation of the Municipality of Mina, which Pelaez found to be unconstitutional. The creation of a Municipality should be through a Bill passed in Congress. The legality of President Macapagal's issuance of Executive Order No. 106 was questioned. In the end, the Supreme Court ruled in favor of Pelaez and ordered Mina to revert to its status as a suburb of Pototan. Its existence as an again independent Municipality was short-lived, only 14 months, from 1 January 1965 to 18 February 1966. It was then Congressman Ricardo Ladrido of the Fourth District of Iloilo, who authored and sponsored House Bill No. 16661 creating the Municipality of Mina in 1968. On 9 September 1968, R.A. No. 5442 was passed, declaring Mina as a municipality of Iloilo.

On November 11, 1969, a special election for the newly created town was held simultaneously with the general (presidential) election. Arthur D. Defensor, a 25-year old lawyer, was the first elected Municipal Mayor.

== Geography ==
Mina is located in the central part of the province. It is 38 kilometres (24 mi) from Iloilo City.

Mina has a total land area of 4,340 hectares and composed of 22 barangays. Being predominantly agriculture, 97% of its land area is classified as rural.

=== Climate ===
Climate data for Mina, Iloilo
Month	Jan	Feb	Mar	Apr	May	Jun	Jul	Aug	Sep	Oct	Nov	Dec	Year
Mean daily maximum °C (°F)	29 (84)	30 (86)	32 (90)	33 (91)	31 (88)	30 (86)	29 (84)	29 (84)	29 (84)	29 (84)	29 (84)	29 (84)	30 (86)
Mean daily minimum °C (°F)	22 (72)	22 (72)	22 (72)	23 (73)	25 (77)	25 (77)	24 (75)	24 (75)	24 (75)	24 (75)	23 (73)	22 (72)	23 (74)
Average precipitation mm (inches)	48 (1.9)	41 (1.6)	58 (2.3)	82 (3.2)	223 (8.8)	300 (11.8)	346 (13.6)	307 (12.1)	311 (12.2)	292 (11.5)	167 (6.6)	81 (3.2)	2,256 (88.8)
Average rainy days	11.4	7.7	11.3	15.4	25.7	28.5	29.5	28.7	28.3	28.7	21.8	15.2	252.2
Source: Meteoblue

=== Barangays ===
Mina is politically subdivided into 22 barangays. Each barangay consists of puroks and some have sitios.

- Abat
- Agmanaphao
- Amiroy
- Badiangan
- Bangac
- Cabalabaguan
- Capul-an
- Dala
- Guibuangan
- Janipa-an West
- Janipa-an East
- Mina East (Poblacion)
- Mina West (Poblacion)
- Nasirum
- Naumuan
- Singay
- Talibong Grande
- Talibong Pequeño
- Tipolo
- Tolarucan
- Tumay
- Yugot

== Demographics ==
Population census of Mina
Year	Pop.	±% p.a.
1903	4,280	—
1970	9,649	+1.22%
1975	11,641	+3.84%
1980	12,290	+1.09%
1990	15,808	+2.55%
1995	16,419	+0.71%
2000	18,096	+2.11%
2007	19,809	+1.26%
2010	21,785	+3.52%
2015	23,546	+1.49%
2020	24,042	+0.44%
2024	24,145	+0.10%
Source: Philippine Statistics Authority

In the 2024 census, the population of Mina was 24,145 people, with a density of 560 inhabitants per square kilometre or 1,500 inhabitants per square mile.

== Economy ==
Poverty incidence of Mina (%)

Source: Philippine Statistics Authority

Major source of income of the residents is rice farming. Some are engaged in livelihood projects such as hog raising/fattening, poultry and small business enterprises.
