= Narciso Monfort =

Filipino physician and politician (1928–2005)

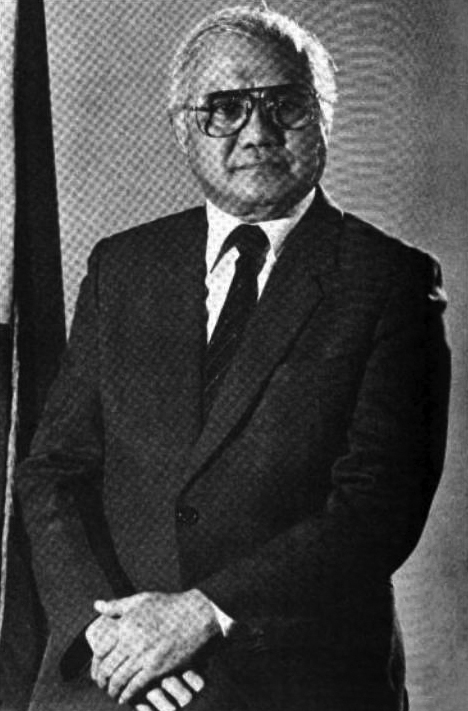
- Monfort's official portrait during the 8th Congress

Member of the Philippine House of Representatives for Iloilo's 4th district
- In office June 30, 1995 – June 30, 2004
- Preceded by: Nicetas Panes
- Succeeded by: Ferjenel Biron
- In office June 30, 1987 – June 30, 1992
- Preceded by: District established
- Succeeded by: Nicetas Panes

Member of the Batasang Pambansa
- In office June 30, 1984 – March 25, 1986 Serving with Salvador Britanico, Fermin Caram Jr., Arthur Defensor Sr., and Rafael Palmares
- Constituency: Iloilo
- In office June 12, 1978 – June 30, 1984 Serving with many others
- Constituency: Region VI

Personal details
- Born: May 1, 1928 Dumangas, Iloilo, Philippine Islands
- Died: September 5, 2005 (aged 77)
- Party: Lakas (1997–2005)
- Other political affiliations: LDP (1991–1997); PDP–Laban (1988–1991); LnB (1987–1988); KBL (1978–1986)
- Spouse: Carmen Guevara
- Children: 2
- Nickname(s): Goodah, Narcing

Narciso Dolar Monfort (May 1, 1928 – September 5, 2005) was a Filipino physician and politician who served as the representative for Iloilo's 4th congressional district in the Philippine House of Representatives from 1987 to 1992 and from 1995 to 2004. Popularly known as "Goodah" to colleagues and constituents, he previously served as a member of the Batasang Pambansa, representing Region VI from 1978 to 1984 and the province from 1984 to 1986.

== Early life and education ==
Narciso Dolar Monfort was born on May 1, 1928, in Dumangas, Iloilo, to Jose Sustiguer Monfort and Purificacion Diancin Dolar. He attended Dumangas Elementary School for his primary education and the University of Iloilo for his secondary education. He completed his pre-medicine courses at the University of San Agustin before earning a Doctor of Medicine degree from the University of Santo Tomas in 1956.

In 1959, Monfort obtained a Certificate in Public Health from the University of the Philippines and later received a diploma in Occupational and Industrial Medicine from the Philippine Occupational and Industrial Medical Association.

== Early career ==
Monfort served as Presidential Assistant on Health under presidents Ramon Magsaysay and Carlos P. Garcia, and later as Presidential Assistant on Political Affairs under President Diosdado Macapagal. Under President Ferdinand Marcos, Monfort was appointed commissioner of the Home Financing Commission and subsequently served as assistant to the director of the Bureau of Health and as deputy minister of health.

== Batasang Pambansa (1978–1986) ==
In the 1978 elections to the newly established Batasang Pambansa, Monfort placed first among 35 candidates in Region VI, running under Kilusang Bagong Lipunan. In 1982, he represented the Philippines at the 37th session of the United Nations General Assembly in New York City.

He was re-elected in 1984, representing Iloilo alongside three other assemblymen. During his tenure, he served as vice chairman of the parliamentary Committee on Health and as a member of the committees on Agriculture and Food and Foreign Affairs.

Monfort served until 1986, when the People Power Revolution led to the promulgation of a provisional Constitution and the abolition of the Batasang Pambansa.

== House of Representatives (1987–1992) ==
In 1987, Monfort successfully ran under the administration-aligned Lakas ng Bansa for the seat representing Iloilo's 4th congressional district in the House of Representatives. During the 8th Congress, he chaired the House Committee on Health and served on six other committees as part of the majority bloc.

== Senatorial bid (1992) ==
Four years after Lakas ng Bansa merged with the PDP–Laban faction led by Peping Cojuangco to form Laban ng Demokratikong Pilipino (LDP), Monfort ran on the LDP senatorial slate led by Ramon Mitra Jr. and Marcelo Fernan in the 1992 elections but lost, placing 39th.

== House of Representatives (1995–2004) ==
Monfort returned to the House of Representatives after winning in the 1995 elections. He was re-elected in 1998 and 2001 before retiring from public office.

On January 24, 2001, Monfort was elected assistant majority leader under newly elected House speaker Feliciano Belmonte Jr.

== Personal life ==
Monfort was married to Carmen Teresita Guevara Monfort, with whom he had two children, including Carmen Rita, who served as a member of the Iloilo Provincial Board from 2013 to 2016. He died on September 5, 2005.

== Electoral history ==
Electoral history of Narciso Monfort
Year	Office	Party	Votes received				Result
Year	Office	Party	Total	%	P.	Swing	Result
1978	Assemblyman (Region VI)	KBL	1,195,069	5.82%	1st	—N/a	Won
1984	Assemblyman (Iloilo)	KBL	248,680	—N/a	4th	—N/a	Won
1987	Representative (Iloilo–4th)	LnB	—N/a	—N/a	1st	—N/a	Won
1995	Representative (Iloilo–4th)	LDP	64,904	63.81%	1st	—N/a	Won
1998	Representative (Iloilo–4th)	Lakas	77,585	68.12%	1st	+4.31	Won
2001	Representative (Iloilo–4th)	Lakas	—N/a	—N/a	1st	—N/a	Won
1992	Senator of the Philippines	LDP	2,483,459	10.24%	39th	—N/a	Lost

House of Representatives of the Philippines
Preceded by Nicetas Panes	Member of the Philippine House of Representatives for Iloilo's 4th district 1995–2004	Succeeded by Ferjenel Biron
New district	Member of the Philippine House of Representatives for Iloilo's 4th district 1987–1992	Succeeded by Nicetas Panes
New district	Member of the Batasang Pambansa from Iloilo; 1984–1986; With: Salvador Britanico, Fermin Caram Jr., Arthur Defensor Sr., and Rafael Palmares	District abolished
New district	Member of the Batasang Pambansa from Region VI; 1978–1984; With: Many others	District abolished
