= Region VI's at-large parliamentary district =

Former Philippine parliamentary district

- Former constituency for the Interim Batasang Pambansa

Former constituency
- Created: 1978
- Abolished: 1984
- Seats: 16

Region VI's at-large parliamentary district (also known as Western Visayas's at-large parliamentary district) was a constituency for the Interim Batasang Pambansa, the legislature of the Philippines from 1978 to 1984. It encompassed the provinces of Aklan, Antique, Capiz, Guimaras, Iloilo, and Negros Occidental, together with the cities of Bacolod, Bago, Cadiz, Iloilo, La Carlota, Roxas, San Carlos and Silay.

The district had 16 seats in the assembly, all of which were held by members of the ruling party Kilusang Bagong Lipunan.

== List of assemblymen representing the district ==
=== Batasang Pambansa (1978–1986) ===
Portrait	Member (Lifespan) (Province/City)	Term of office	Party	Legislature	Electoral history	Constituencies
District established February 7, 1978.
	Teodoro Benedicto (Bacolod City)	June 12, 1978 – June 30, 1984	KBL	Interim Batasang Pambansa	Elected in 1978.	1978–1984; Provinces: Aklan, Antique, Capiz, Guimaras, Iloilo, Negros Occidental Cities: Bacolod, Bago, Cadiz, Iloilo, La Carlota, Roxas, San Carlos, Silay
	Salvador Britanico (1937–2026) (Iloilo)	June 12, 1978 – June 30, 1984	KBL	Interim Batasang Pambansa	Elected in 1978.	1978–1984; Provinces: Aklan, Antique, Capiz, Guimaras, Iloilo, Negros Occidental Cities: Bacolod, Bago, Cadiz, Iloilo, La Carlota, Roxas, San Carlos, Silay
	Fermin Caram Jr. (1922–1986) (Iloilo City)	June 12, 1978 – June 30, 1984	KBL	Interim Batasang Pambansa	Elected in 1978.	1978–1984; Provinces: Aklan, Antique, Capiz, Guimaras, Iloilo, Negros Occidental Cities: Bacolod, Bago, Cadiz, Iloilo, La Carlota, Roxas, San Carlos, Silay
	Pedro Exmundo (Capiz)	June 12, 1978 – June 30, 1984	KBL	Interim Batasang Pambansa	Elected in 1978.	1978–1984; Provinces: Aklan, Antique, Capiz, Guimaras, Iloilo, Negros Occidental Cities: Bacolod, Bago, Cadiz, Iloilo, La Carlota, Roxas, San Carlos, Silay
	Alfonso Garcia (Bacolod City)	June 12, 1978 – June 30, 1984	KBL	Interim Batasang Pambansa	Elected in 1978.	1978–1984; Provinces: Aklan, Antique, Capiz, Guimaras, Iloilo, Negros Occidental Cities: Bacolod, Bago, Cadiz, Iloilo, La Carlota, Roxas, San Carlos, Silay
	Roberto Gatuslao (Bacolod City)	June 12, 1978 – June 30, 1984	KBL	Interim Batasang Pambansa	Elected in 1978.	1978–1984; Provinces: Aklan, Antique, Capiz, Guimaras, Iloilo, Negros Occidental Cities: Bacolod, Bago, Cadiz, Iloilo, La Carlota, Roxas, San Carlos, Silay
	Rodolfo Layumas (San Carlos City)	June 12, 1978 – June 30, 1984	KBL	Interim Batasang Pambansa	Elected in 1978.	1978–1984; Provinces: Aklan, Antique, Capiz, Guimaras, Iloilo, Negros Occidental Cities: Bacolod, Bago, Cadiz, Iloilo, La Carlota, Roxas, San Carlos, Silay
	Leopoldo Locsin (Iloilo)	June 12, 1978 – June 30, 1984	KBL	Interim Batasang Pambansa	Elected in 1978.	1978–1984; Provinces: Aklan, Antique, Capiz, Guimaras, Iloilo, Negros Occidental Cities: Bacolod, Bago, Cadiz, Iloilo, La Carlota, Roxas, San Carlos, Silay
	Jaenito Madamba (Capiz)	June 12, 1978 – June 30, 1984	KBL	Interim Batasang Pambansa	Elected in 1978.	1978–1984; Provinces: Aklan, Antique, Capiz, Guimaras, Iloilo, Negros Occidental Cities: Bacolod, Bago, Cadiz, Iloilo, La Carlota, Roxas, San Carlos, Silay
	Narciso Monfort (1928–2005) (Iloilo)	June 12, 1978 – June 30, 1984	KBL	Interim Batasang Pambansa	Elected in 1978.	1978–1984; Provinces: Aklan, Antique, Capiz, Guimaras, Iloilo, Negros Occidental Cities: Bacolod, Bago, Cadiz, Iloilo, La Carlota, Roxas, San Carlos, Silay
	Jose Montalvo (1925–2017) (Bacolod City)	June 12, 1978 – June 30, 1984	KBL	Interim Batasang Pambansa	Elected in 1978.	1978–1984; Provinces: Aklan, Antique, Capiz, Guimaras, Iloilo, Negros Occidental Cities: Bacolod, Bago, Cadiz, Iloilo, La Carlota, Roxas, San Carlos, Silay
	Remo Montelibano (Bacolod City)	June 12, 1978 – June 30, 1984	KBL	Interim Batasang Pambansa	Elected in 1978.	1978–1984; Provinces: Aklan, Antique, Capiz, Guimaras, Iloilo, Negros Occidental Cities: Bacolod, Bago, Cadiz, Iloilo, La Carlota, Roxas, San Carlos, Silay
	Arturo Pacificador (1930–2015) (Antique)	June 12, 1978 – June 30, 1984	KBL	Interim Batasang Pambansa	Elected in 1978.	1978–1984; Provinces: Aklan, Antique, Capiz, Guimaras, Iloilo, Negros Occidental Cities: Bacolod, Bago, Cadiz, Iloilo, La Carlota, Roxas, San Carlos, Silay
	Jose Tumbokon (1928–2019) (Aklan)	June 12, 1978 – June 30, 1984	KBL	Interim Batasang Pambansa	Elected in 1978.	1978–1984; Provinces: Aklan, Antique, Capiz, Guimaras, Iloilo, Negros Occidental Cities: Bacolod, Bago, Cadiz, Iloilo, La Carlota, Roxas, San Carlos, Silay
	Niel Tupas Sr. (1932–2015) (Iloilo)	June 12, 1978 – June 30, 1984	KBL	Interim Batasang Pambansa	Elected in 1978.	1978–1984; Provinces: Aklan, Antique, Capiz, Guimaras, Iloilo, Negros Occidental Cities: Bacolod, Bago, Cadiz, Iloilo, La Carlota, Roxas, San Carlos, Silay
	Jose Varela Jr. (Bacolod City)	June 12, 1978 – June 30, 1984	KBL	Interim Batasang Pambansa	Elected in 1978.	1978–1984; Provinces: Aklan, Antique, Capiz, Guimaras, Iloilo, Negros Occidental Cities: Bacolod, Bago, Cadiz, Iloilo, La Carlota, Roxas, San Carlos, Silay
District dissolved into Aklan's at-large, Antique's at-large, Capiz's at-large, Guimaras's at-large, Iloilo's at-large, and Negros Occidental's at-large districts.

== Election results ==
=== 1978 ===
Candidate	Party	Votes	%
Narciso Monfort	KBL	1,195,069	5.82
Niel Tupas	KBL	1,189,529	5.80
Fermin Caram	KBL	1,186,267	5.78
Salvador Britanico	KBL	1,180,554	5.75
Roberto Gatuslao	KBL	1,163,536	5.67
Leopoldo Locsin	KBL	1,156,429	5.64
Remo Montelibano	KBL	1,146,083	5.59
Teodoro Benedicto	KBL	1,135,107	5.53
Arturo Pacificador	KBL	1,113,846	5.43
Alfonso Garcia	KBL	1,101,911	5.37
Jose Varela Jr.	KBL	1,096,790	5.35
Jose Montalvo	KBL	1,094,203	5.33
Jose Tumbokon	KBL	1,093,804	5.33
Pedro Exmundo	KBL	1,083,136	5.28
Jaenito Madamba	KBL	1,033,803	5.04
Rodolfo Layumas	KBL	1,032,596	5.03
Alex Espino	Independent	365,234	1.78
Pascual Espinosa	Independent	270,355	1.32
Andresito Fornier	Independent	245,557	1.20
Nerio Salcedo Jr.	Independent	186,180	0.91
Fredenil Castro	Independent	181,790	0.89
Juan Dayang	Independent	173,359	0.84
Resurrecion Salvilla	Independent	155,833	0.76
Felipe Macahilig Jr.	Independent	143,148	0.70
Enrique Olmedo	Independent	139,857	0.68
Lucio Himbing Jr.	Independent	125,289	0.61
Nelson Oquendo	Independent	113,561	0.55
Benjamin Moreno	Independent	82,188	0.40
Arturo Doronila	Independent	69,185	0.34
Vicente Balsomo	Independent	65,251	0.32
Ruben Duron	Philippine Labor Party	62,688	0.31
Alfredo Loyola	Independent	56,838	0.28
Nic Garces	Independent	50,079	0.24
Roger Nite	Partido ng Bagong Pilipinas	18,050	0.09
Jovito Pabion	Partido ng Bagong Pilipinas	10,126	0.05
Total		20,517,231	100.00
Total votes		1,644,637	–
Registered voters/turnout		1,878,497	87.55
