= Rafael Palmares =

Filipino politician (1935–2004)

Member of the Batasang Pambansa from Iloilo
- In office June 30, 1984 – March 25, 1986 Serving with Salvador Britanico, Fermin Caram Jr., Arthur Defensor Sr., and Narciso Monfort

24th Governor of Iloilo
- In office January 1, 1964 – December 31, 1969
- Vice Governor: Conrado Norada
- Preceded by: Jose Zulueta
- Succeeded by: Conrado Norada

Personal details
- Born: Rafael Paciente Palmares; June 12, 1935 Passi, Iloilo, Philippine Islands
- Died: 2004 (aged 68–69)
- Party: Nacionalista (1969–1987)
- Other political affiliations: Liberal (1964–1969)

Rafael "Nono" Paciente Palmares Sr. (June 12, 1935 – c. 2004) was a Filipino lawyer and politician who served as a member of the Batasang Pambansa for Iloilo's at-large parliamentary district from 1984 to 1986. He previously served as governor of Iloilo from 1964 to 1969.

He ran for senator twice, first in 1969 and again in 1987, losing both bids.

== Electoral history ==
Electoral history of Rafael Palmares
Year	Office	Party	Votes received				Result
Year	Office	Party	Total	%	P.	Swing	Result
1964	Governor of Iloilo	Liberal	—N/a	—N/a	1st	—N/a	Won
1984	Assemblyman (Iloilo)	Nacionalista	309,839	—N/a	3rd	—N/a	Won
1969	Senator of the Philippines	Nacionalista	3,393,677	41.37%	9th	—N/a	Lost
1987	Senator of the Philippines	Nacionalista	1,974,023	8.68%	44th	−32.69	Lost

House of Representatives of the Philippines
New district	Member of the Batasang Pambansa from Iloilo; 1984–1986; With: Salvador Britanico, Fermin Caram Jr., Arthur Defensor Sr., and Narciso Monfort	District abolished
Political offices
Preceded by Jose Zulueta	Governor of Iloilo; 1955–1961	Succeeded by Conrado Norada
