= West Visayas State University, Pototan =

Public university in Iloilo, Philippines

West Visayas State University
- Motto: "Service, Harmony, Excellence"
- Type: State University
- Established: 1902 (system); 1945 (campus)
- President: Dr. Joselito F. Villaruz
- Administrator: Dr. Raymund B. Gemora
- Location: Pototan, Iloilo, Philippines; 10°56′37″N 122°38′33″E
- Campus: Suburban
- Colors: Blue & gold
- Nickname: Taga-West
- Sporting affiliations: SCUAA
- Location in the Visayas Location in the Philippines

West Visayas State University, Pototan is in Pototan, Iloilo, Philippines, has evolved from a high school and in 2000 became one of four satellite universities in the Third Congressional District of Iloilo of the West Visayas State University system (WVSU).

== History ==
The history, growth and development of the university can be traced back to the post-war refresher classes under the umbrella of Iloilo High School in 1945. The name then evolved from Pototan Regional High School (Iloilo Branch), to Iloilo Provincial High School in 1946 and, Pototan High School from 1947 to 1957.

From the NARIC building where classes were originally held, it moved to a 20-room nipa building at the town plaza and finally transferred to its present site at Barangay Cau-ayan, Pototan. Of the 11.5-hectare school site, 9.5 hectares (23 acres) were donated by some civic spirited Pototanons and another 2 hectares (4.9 acres) were purchased by the school..

On June 22, 1957, Pototan High School was converted to Pototan Vocational School by virtue of Republic Act No. 1924. For 26 years, this school had been the training ground for technical-vocational education.

On June 24, 1983, it was converted into Pototan College of Arts and Sciences. Degree programs in education were added to the trade-technical courses. More buildings and classrooms were built and additional facilities were acquired.

On January 29, 1999, pursuant to Special Provision No. 9 of Republic Act No. 8760, Pototan College of Arts and Sciences was integrated to West Visayas State University, Iloilo City. This integration became operational on August 22, 2000, through the issuance of CHED Memorandum Order 27, s. 2000. The school is then called West Visayas State University-Pototan Campus.

As part of the university system, this campus has offered additional degree programs in line with teacher education, industrial, information, business and management technology.
