= Ati language =

Ati language may refer to:

- Ati language (China)
- Ati language (Nigeria)
- Ati language (Philippines)
- Ati language (Vanuatu)
