= Ferjenel Biron =

Filipino politician and physician

Ferjenel Gonzales Biron
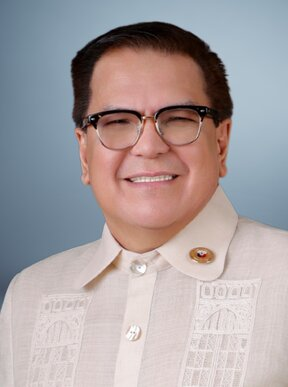
- Official portrait, 2025

Deputy Speaker of the House of Representatives of the Philippines
- Incumbent
- Assumed office July 28, 2025
- House Speaker: Martin Romualdez; Faustino "Bojie" Dy III

Member of the Philippine House of Representatives from Iloilo's 4th District
- Incumbent
- Assumed office June 30, 2022
- Preceded by: Braeden John Q. Biron
- In office June 30, 2016 – June 30, 2019
- Preceded by: Hernan G. Biron, Jr
- Succeeded by: Braeden John Q. Biron
- In office June 30, 2004 – June 30, 2013
- Preceded by: Narciso Monfort
- Succeeded by: Hernan G. Biron, Jr

Personal details
- Born: December 26, 1964 (age 61) Barotac Nuevo, Iloilo, Philippines
- Party: Nacionalista (2009–2012; 2016–present)
- Other political affiliations: NUP (2015–2016); UNA (2012–2015); KAMPI (2004–2007); Lakas (2007–2009); LDP (2001–2004)
- Spouse: Jessica Candace S. Quan
- Children: 3
- Education: Central Philippine University; West Visayas State University; Asian Institute of Management University of Asia & the Pacific

Ferjenel Gonzales Biron (born December 26, 1964) is a Filipino politician and physician. Since 2004, he has served multiple terms in the Congress of the Philippines as a representative from Iloilo. He is the founder of the Pharmawealth Group of Companies and was the Chief Executive Officer until his election to Congress in 2004.

Biron was elected as a member of the Commission on Appointments on August 8, 2022.
