= Iloilo's at-large congressional district =

Legislative district of the Philippines

Iloilo's at-large congressional district refers to the provincewide electoral district that was used to elect members of Philippine national legislatures in Iloilo before 1987.

Iloilo first elected its representatives at-large in the 1943 Philippine legislative election for a seat in the National Assembly of the Second Philippine Republic, with a separate district created for Iloilo City being a chartered city since 1936. Before 1943, the province which also included Guimaras was represented in the national legislatures through its first, second, third, fourth and fifth districts. The province was also earlier represented in the Malolos Congress of the First Philippine Republic in 1898 by appointed delegates residing in Luzon.

The five districts were restored in Iloilo ahead of the 1941 Philippine House of Representatives elections whose elected representatives only began to serve following the dissolution of the Second Republic and the restoration of the Philippine Commonwealth in 1945. An at-large district would not be used in the province again until the 1984 Philippine parliamentary election for five seats in the Batasang Pambansa which it shared with its highly urbanized capital city. It became obsolete following the 1987 reapportionment under a new constitution that restored the five districts in Iloilo and Iloilo City's at-large district.

== Representation history ==
#	Term of office		National Assembly	Seat A				Seat B				Seat C				Seat D							
#	Start	End	National Assembly	Image	Member	Party	Electoral history	Image	Member	Party	Electoral history	Image	Member	Party	Electoral history	Image	Member	Party	Electoral history				
=== Iloilo's at-large district for the Malolos Congress ===
District created June 18, 1898.
–	September 15, 1898	March 23, 1901	1st		Venancio Concepción	Nonpartisan	Appointed.		Melecio Figueroa	Nonpartisan	Appointed.		Tiburcio Hilario	Nonpartisan	Appointed.		Esteban de la Rama	Nonpartisan	Appointed.				
#	Term of office		National Assembly	Seat A				Seat B				Seats eliminated											
#	Start	End	National Assembly	Image	Member	Party	Electoral history	Image	Member	Party	Electoral history	Seats eliminated											
=== Iloilo's at-large district for the National Assembly (Second Philippine Republic) ===												Seats eliminated											
District re-created September 7, 1943.												Seats eliminated											
–	September 25, 1943	February 2, 1944	1st		Cirilo Mapa Jr.	KALIBAPI	Elected in 1943.		Fermín G. Caram	KALIBAPI	Appointed as an ex officio member.	Seats eliminated											
District dissolved into Iloilo's 1st, 2nd, 3rd, 4th and 5th districts.												Seats eliminated											
#	Term of office		Batasang Pambansa	Seat A				Seat B				Seat C				Seat D				Seat E			
#	Start	End	Batasang Pambansa	Image	Member	Party	Electoral history	Image	Member	Party	Electoral history	Image	Member	Party	Electoral history	Image	Member	Party	Electoral history	Image	Member	Party	Electoral history
=== Iloilo's at-large district for the Regular Batasang Pambansa ===
District re-created February 1, 1984.
–	July 23, 1984	March 25, 1986	2nd		Salvador B. Britanico	KBL	Elected in 1984.		Fermin Z. Caram Jr.	UNIDO	Elected in 1984.		Arthur Defensor Sr.	UNIDO	Elected in 1984.		Narciso Monfort	KBL	Elected in 1984.		Rafael Palmares	Nacionalista	Elected in 1984.
District dissolved into Iloilo's 1st, 2nd, 3rd, 4th, 5th and Iloilo City's at-large districts.

== See also ==
- Legislative districts of Iloilo
