= Pototan =

Municipality in Iloilo, Philippines

- Municipality
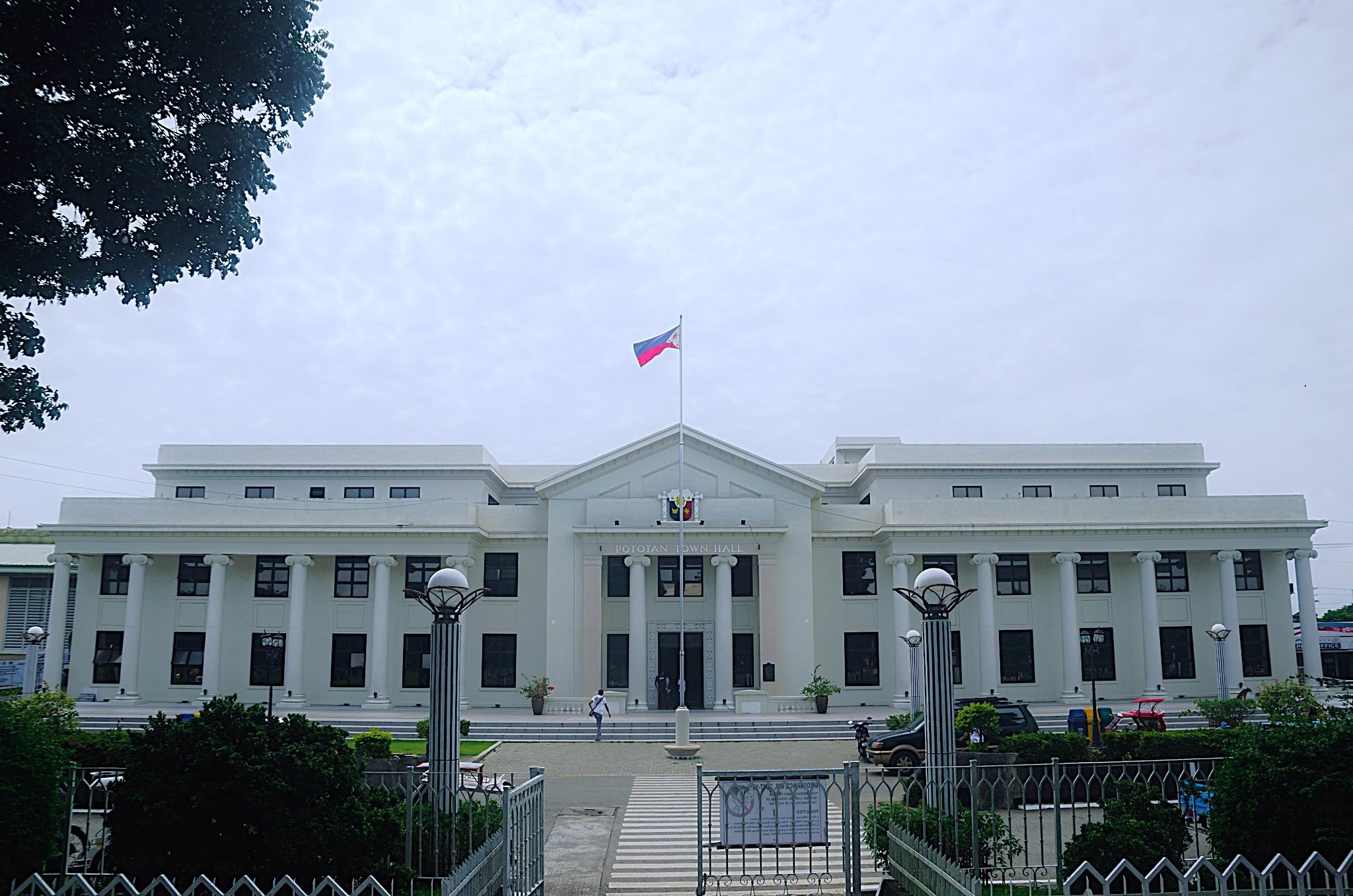
- Pototan Town Hall

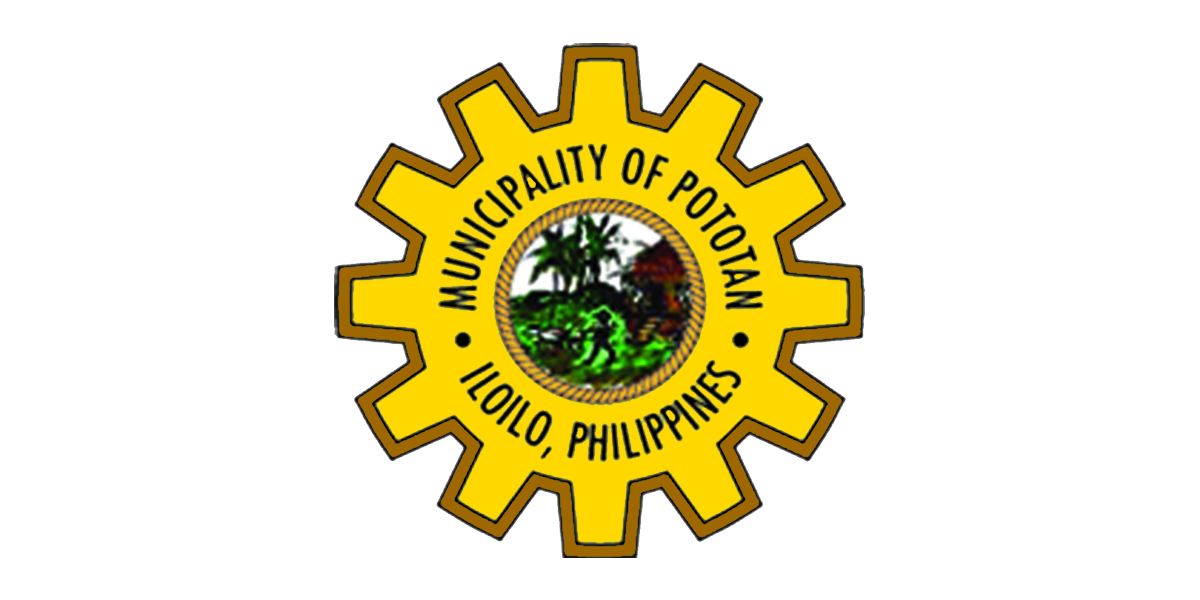
- Flag Seal
- Nicknames: Rice Granary and Christmas Capital of Western Visayas
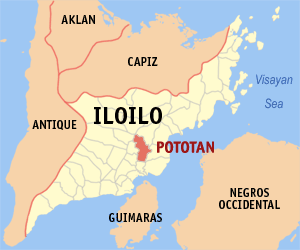
- Map of Iloilo with Pototan highlighted
- Interactive map of Pototan
- Location within the Philippines
- Coordinates: 10°57′N 122°38′E
- Country: Philippines
- Region: Western Visayas
- Province: Iloilo
- District: 3rd district
- Founded: 1593
- Barangays: 50 (see Barangays)

Government
  - Type: Sangguniang Bayan
  - Mayor: Rafael Enrique P. Lazaro (PFP)
  - Vice Mayor: Joselito Romualdo M. Ilisan (Akbayan)
  - Representative: Lorenz R. Defensor (NUP)
  - Municipal Council: Members: Paolo Lorenzo L. Tirador (PFP); Kirk P. Pedrajas (Akbayan); Nonito Q. Pasuelo, Jr. (Akbayan); Donnabelle S. Mendoza (Akbayan); Mark Angelo C. Perez (PFP); Ma. Concepcion Q. Dayot-Sumergido (Lakas); Nielo Angelo J. Palu-ay (PFP); Reynaldo E. Umalay, Jr. (Akbayan); Sherwin Peñaranda ^{‡}; Verna Angelique G. Pastolero ^{◌}; ‡ ex officio ABC president; ◌ ex officio SK chairman
  - Electorate: 46,521 voters (2025)

Area
  - Total: 97.10 km^{2} (37.49 sq mi)
- Elevation: 25 m (82 ft)
- Highest elevation: 59 m (194 ft)
- Lowest elevation: 12 m (39 ft)

Population (2024 census)
  - Total: 78,919
  - Density: 812.8/km^{2} (2,105/sq mi)
  - Households: 18,761
- Demonym(s): Filipino: Taga-Pototan; Kinaray-a: Pototanon; Hiligaynon: Pototanon

Economy
  - Income class: 1st municipal income class
  - Poverty incidence: 11.92% (2023)
  - Revenue: ₱ 346.6 million (2024)
  - Assets: ₱ 1,035 million (2024)
  - Expenditure: ₱ 327 million (2024)
  - Liabilities: ₱ 32.42 million (2024)

Service provider
  - Electricity: Iloilo 2 Electric Cooperative (ILECO 2)
- Time zone: UTC+8 (PST)
- ZIP code: 5008
- PSGC: 063037000
- IDD : area code: +63 (0)33
- Native languages: Karay-a; Hiligaynon; Tagalog
- Website: www.pototan.gov.ph

Pototan (Kinaray-a: Banwa ka Pototan, Hiligaynon: Banwa sang Pototan, Tagalog: Bayan ng Pototan), is a 1st class municipality in the province of Iloilo, Philippines. According to the 2024 census, it has a population of 78,919 people.

In December 1997, it was declared as the "Christmas Capital of Western Visayas" because of its famed Christmas Festival of Lights.

== History ==
=== Early history ===
The first people of Pototan were the family of Datu Ramon, grandson of Datu Puti, a Malay from the town of Dumangas. They first settled at Barangay Naslo, which was formerly the poblacion (town center). In that place was found a luxuriant growth of trees called "putat", after which the place was subsequently called "Kaputatan" or "place of many Putat trees." However, due to its hilly terrain and poor water supply, they decided to move nearer the bank of the Suage River, now called Pototan.

In the middle of the 16th century, the Chinese traders arrived in Pototan.

=== Spanish era ===
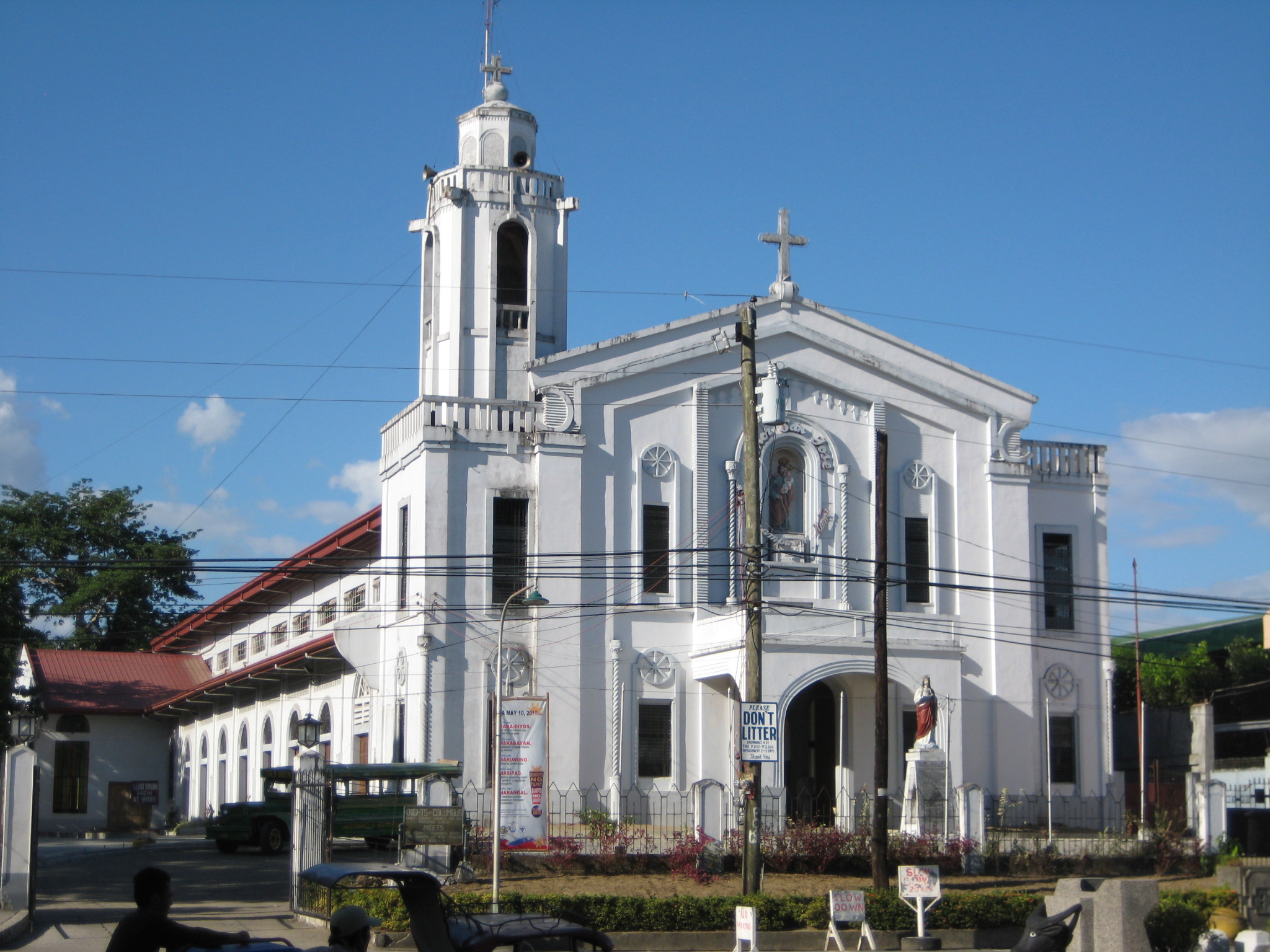
St. Joseph's Church

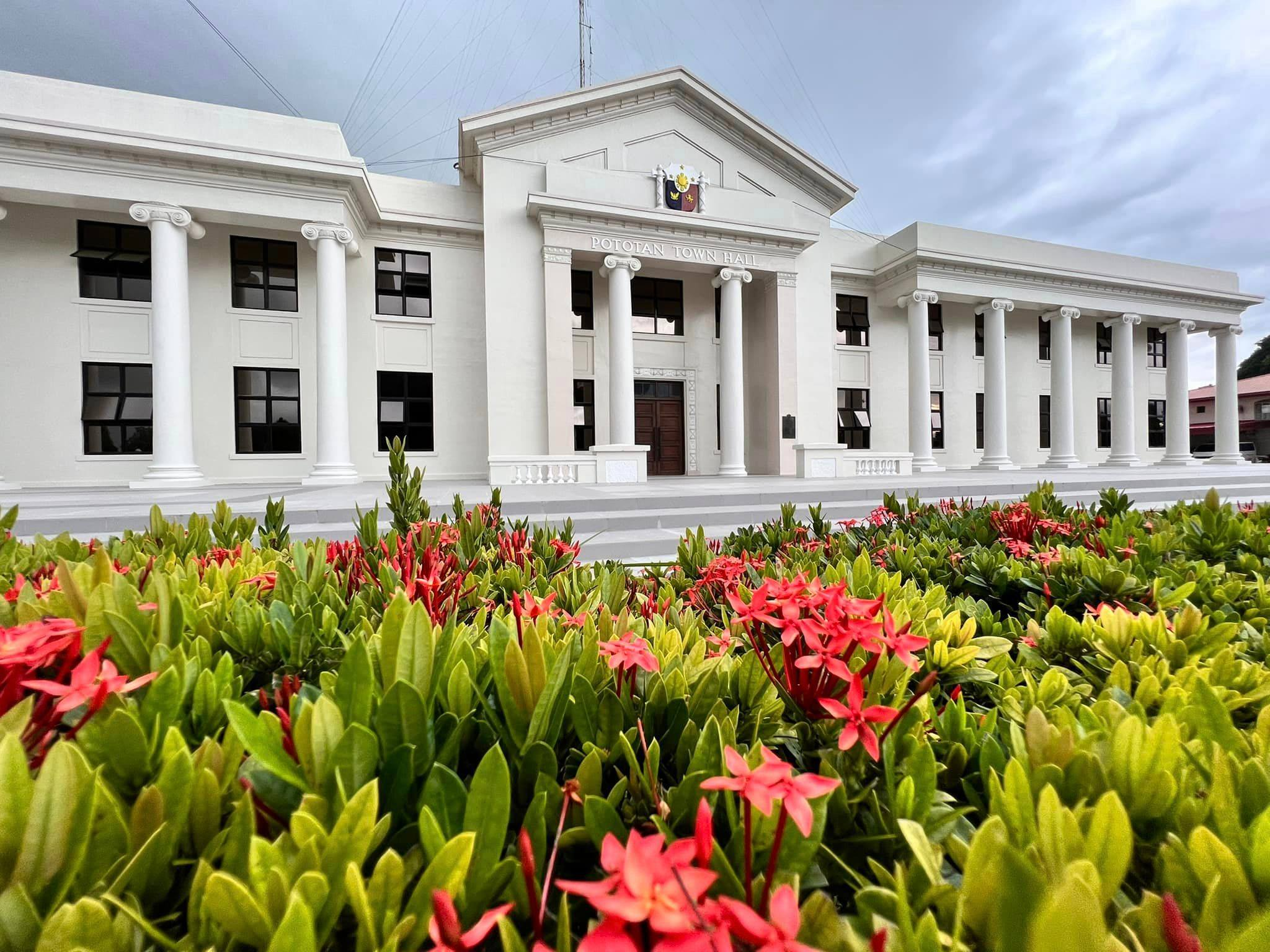
Pototan Town Hall

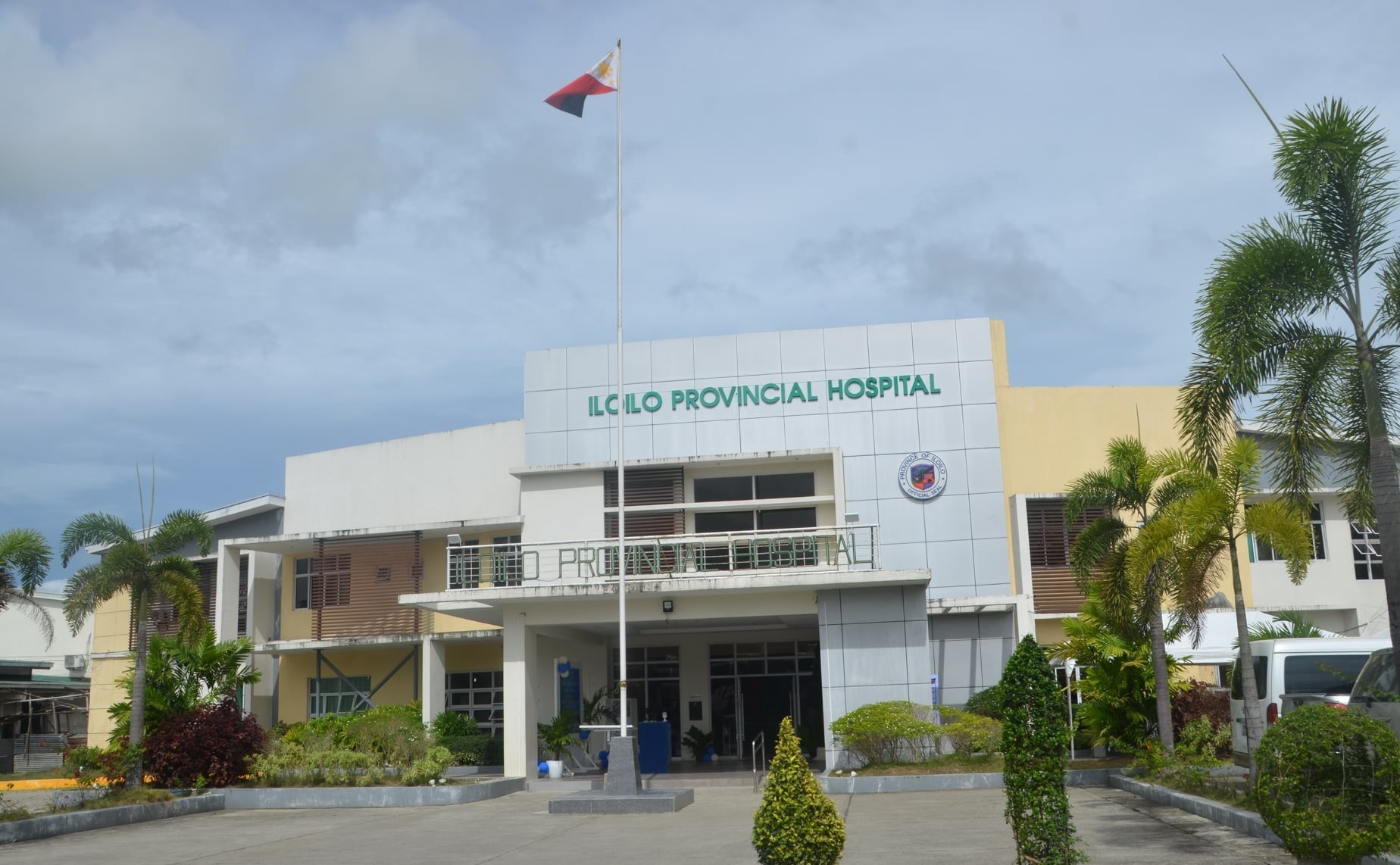
Iloilo Provincial Hospital

The arrival of the Spaniards in 1593 sparked new changes in the socio-economic and political life of the natives. It was the start of a new era, the natives were converted to Catholicism through the efforts of Augustinian Friars. The settlement was subsequently made into a Parish. Education, though at the onset only for the privileged few, was introduced. The name "Kaputatan", which the Spanish have difficulty pronouncing, was changed to "Pototan".

The Spanish built roads and bridges. Don Tomas Sajen and Don Escribano supervised the construction of the Tribunal (municipal hall) with the natives contributing the labor. The Tribunal withstood World War II and in the early 50s was modified into what is now the Western Visayas Hospital.

In 1874, Pototanons began to run their own political affairs with the appointment of Don Juan Marcelo as the first Capitan Municipal. This form of government continued until the arrival of the Americans.

During the incumbency of Capitan Municipal Braulio Peñaranda in 1891, there was a cholera outbreak.

During the Philippine Revolution, Pototanons such as Teresa Magbanua (known as the Joan of arc of the Visayas) and her two brothers, Elias and Pascual Magbanua took up arms and joined the revolution.

The Americans arrived after Spain ceded Philippines to the United States in 1898. The remaining Spanish population fled to the hills together with many Filipinos including the last Gobernadorcillio, Don Maurilio Mendoza. He was later held prisoner by the Americans but subsequently named the first Municipal President.

=== American era ===
Under the Americans, the natives were granted the freedom of speech and worship. Education was liberalized; more and better roads and bridges were constructed. Improvements were also noticed in the economic, social and cultural life of the people.

During the incumbency of Mun. President Maurillo Mendoza, the Pototanons again witnessed another unforgettable event: the burning of the entire half of the poblacion in November 1914. The cause of the fire is unknown.

When the Philippine Constitution was ratified in 1935, another change in the town's local governance was introduced: the title of Municipal President was changed to Municipal Mayor. Santiago Puig was the first Municipal Mayor. He was succeeded by Mariano Peñaflorida in 1940. Peñaflorida served until September 16, 1942.

=== World War II ===
The coming of the Japanese during World War II spread chaos and fear among Pototanons. Mayor Peñaflorida continued to act as Mayor under the Free Revolutionary Government of Tomas Confesor while the Japanese Imperial Forces designated Tomas Ferrariz as Puppet Mayor.

== Geography ==
Pototan lies on the banks of the Suage River, 30 kilometres (19 mi) from Iloilo City and 16 kilometres (9.9 mi) from Janiuay. The town has an area of 94 km^{2}, 85% of which is agricultural land.

Considered the rice granary of Panay, the town is bordered by Dingle to the north, Zarraga to the south, Barotac Nuevo to the east, New Lucena and Mina to the west.

=== Barangays ===
Pototan is politically subdivided into 50 barangays. Each barangay consists of puroks and some have sitios.

- Abangay
- Amamaros
- Bagacay
- Barasan
- Batuan
- Bongco
- Cahaguikican
- Callan
- Cansilayan
- Casalsagan
- Cato-ogan
- Cau-ayan
- Culob
- Danao
- Dapitan
- Dawis
- Dongsol
- Fundacion
- Guinacas
- Guibuangan
- Igang
- Intaluan
- Iwa Ilaud
- Iwa Ilaya
- Jamabalud
- Jebioc
- Lay-ahan
- Primitivo Ledesma Ward (Pob.
- Lopez Jaena Ward (Poblacion)
- Lumbo
- Macatol
- Malusgod
- Naslo
- Nabitasan
- Naga
- Nanga
- Pajo
- Palanguia
- Fernando Parcon Ward (Poblacion)
- Pitogo
- Polot-an
- Purog
- Rumbang
- San Jose Ward (Poblacion)
- Sinuagan
- Tuburan
- Tumcon Ilaya
- Tumcon Ilaud
- Ubang
- Zarrague

=== Climate ===
Climate data for Pototan, Iloilo
Month	Jan	Feb	Mar	Apr	May	Jun	Jul	Aug	Sep	Oct	Nov	Dec	Year
Mean daily maximum °C (°F)	28 (82)	29 (84)	30 (86)	32 (90)	32 (90)	30 (86)	29 (84)	29 (84)	29 (84)	29 (84)	29 (84)	28 (82)	30 (85)
Mean daily minimum °C (°F)	23 (73)	22 (72)	23 (73)	23 (73)	25 (77)	25 (77)	24 (75)	24 (75)	24 (75)	24 (75)	24 (75)	23 (73)	24 (74)
Average precipitation mm (inches)	57 (2.2)	37 (1.5)	41 (1.6)	42 (1.7)	98 (3.9)	155 (6.1)	187 (7.4)	162 (6.4)	179 (7.0)	188 (7.4)	114 (4.5)	78 (3.1)	1,338 (52.8)
Average rainy days	12.0	7.7	9.2	10.2	19.5	24.6	26.9	25.1	25.5	25.2	18.0	13.0	216.9
Source: Meteoblue (modeled/calculated data, not measured locally)

== Demographics ==
Population census of Pototan

Year	Pop.	±% p.a.
1903	20,964	—
1918	25,869	+1.41%
1939	33,020	+1.17%
1948	34,717	+0.56%
1960	37,231	+0.58%
1970	37,250	+0.01%
1975	41,363	+2.12%
1980	44,624	+1.53%

Year	Pop.	±% p.a.
1990	54,035	+1.93%
1995	56,340	+0.79%
2000	61,206	+1.79%
2007	67,626	+1.39%
2010	70,955	+1.76%
2015	75,070	+1.08%
2020	78,298	+0.89%
2024	78,919	+0.19%

Source: Philippine Statistics Authority

In the 2024 census, the population of Pototan was 78,919 people, with a density of 810 inhabitants per square kilometre or 2,100 inhabitants per square mile.

=== Languages ===
Karay·a is the primary language in the municipality.

== Economy ==
Poverty incidence of Pototan (%)

Source: Philippine Statistics Authority

== Education ==
=== Private Schools ===
- Adventist Academy - Iloilo, Inc. (West Visayan Academy)
- Colegio de la Inmaculada Concepción - Hijas de Jesús
- EXEL Montessori de Pototan
- First Bible Baptist Academy
- Pototan Baptist Church Learning Center
- Pototan Christian Learning Center
- The Integrated Academy School System, Inc.

=== Tertiary ===
- West Visayas State University - Pototan Campus

=== Secondary ===
- Alberto Sorongon Sr. Memorial NHS
- Pototan National Comprehensive HS
- Jamabalud NHS
- Jose Facultad Memorial NHS
- Palanguia NHS

=== Primary ===
- Barasan ES
- Batuan ES
- Cahaguikican ES
- Cansilayan ES
- Casalsagan ES
- Danao ES
- Dapitan ES
- Doña Trinidad ES
- Dolores P. Tirador ES
- Edmundo Dayot Memorial ES
- Guibuangan ES
- Guinacas ES
- Igang ES
- Iwa-Macatol ES
- Jamabalud ES
- Juana Bolivar Peñaflorida ES (Amamaros ES)
- Lay-ahan ES
- Lumbo ES
- Maravilla ES
- Matias Yusay Memorial ES
- Nabitasan ES
- Naslo ES
- Palanguia ES
- Pototan Pilot ES
- Rizal ES
- San Juan ES
- Sinuagan ES
- Tuburan ES
- Ubang ES

== Government ==
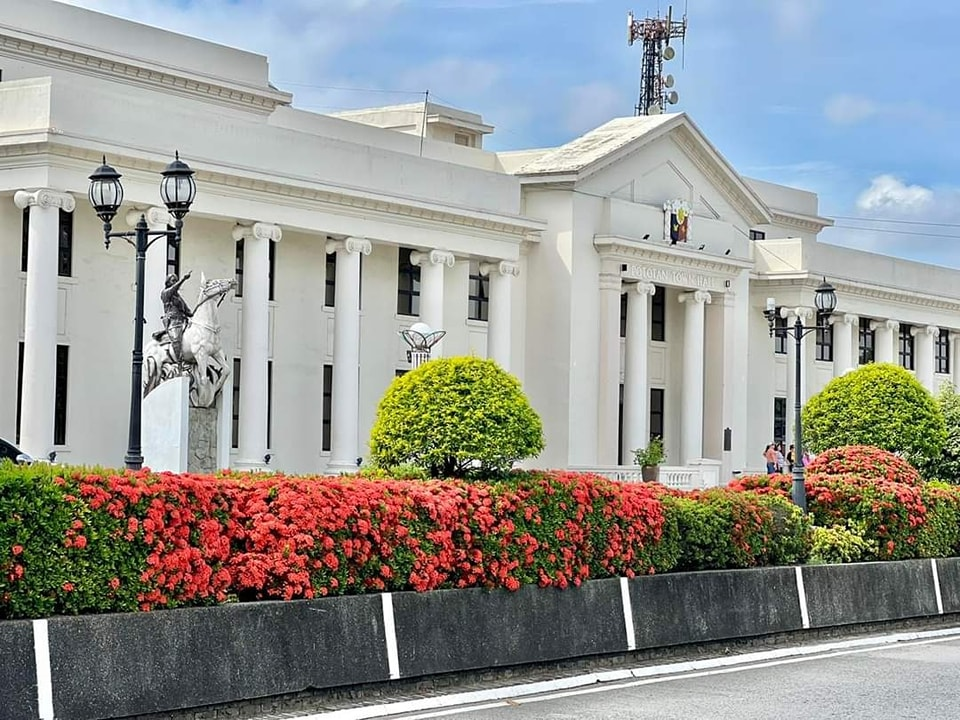
Pototan Town Hall with the "Visayan Joan of Arc"

=== List of chief executives ===
==== Gobernadorcillos ====
Order	Name	Years in Office
1	Juan Marcelo	1774
2	Juan Dato-on	1775
3	? Mangungud	1776
4	Tomás Codese	1777
5	Esteban Balas	1778
6	Juan Figueroa	1779
7	Juan Marcelo	1780
8	Agustín Diego	1781
9	Pedro Suganag	1782
10	Diego Magbanua	1783
11	Juan Figueroa	1784
12	Salvador Fiharon	1785
13	Francisco Zabia	1786
14	Juan Figueroa	1787
	Juan Figueroa	1788
15	Agustín Aliso	1789
16	Miguel Pérez	1790
17	Tomás Antesa	1791
18	Juan Figueroa	1792
19	Juan Cordero	1793
20	Silvestre Feliciano	1794
21	Antonio Mosquera	1795
22	Juan Faustino	1796
23	Miguel Jacinto	1797
24	José Amador	1798
25	Juan Macario	1799
26	Fulgencio Felipe	1800
27	Juan Miguel	1801
28	Alejandro Tingson	1802
29	Agustín Bolívar	1803
30	Nicolás Oberio	1804
31	Gregorio Mariano	1805
32	Julián Narciso	1806
33	Fernando Casumpang	1807
34	Fernando Macario	1808
35	José Belarmino	1809
36	Fulgencio Bernardo	1810
37	Mariano Fausto	1811
38	Miguel Jacinto	1812
39	Fernando Casumpang	1813
40	Fernando Macario	1814
41	Francisco Samas	1815
42	José Ynocencio	1816
43	Juan Faustino	1817
44	Juan Dionisio	1818
45	Juan Domingo	1819
46	Juan Faustino	1820
47	Juan Apolinario Delgado	1821
48	Juan Felipe Álvarez	1822
49	Francisco Pedro	1823
50	Francisco Luciano	1824
51	Mariano de la Cruz	1825
52	Juan Francisco	1826
53	Domingo Tecson	1827
54	Mariano de la Cruz	1828
55	Bernardo Macario	1829
56	Fernando Faustino	1830
57	Antonio Bolívar	1831
58	Agustín Bostrano	1832
59	Juan Bartolomé	1833
60	Francisco Luciano	1834
61	Castro Bolívar	1835
62	Domingo Nerio	1836
63	Lucas Bolívar	1837
64	Salvador Ortega	1838
65	Gregorio Marcelo	1839
66	Antonio de Padua	1840
67	Juan Ilisan	1841
68	Juan Franco	1842
69	Gregorio Casimero	1843
70	Juan Hipólito	1844
71	Mateo Remigio	1845
72	Fernando Casumpang	1846
73	? Peñafort	1847
74	Blas ?	1848
75	Fernando Felipe	1849
76	Manuel Erarco	1850
77	José Tecson	1851
	José Tecson	1852
78	Ambrosio Cordero	1853
79	Francisco Catequista	1854
80	Juan Apolinario	1855
81	Domingo Prudente	1856
82	Benito Ferrariz	1857
83	Nicolás Casumpang	1858
84	Antonio Tingson	1859
85	Bartolomé Magbanua	1860
86	Antonio Peremne	1861
87	Benito Ferrariz	1862-1863
88	Borromeo Penero	1864-1865
89	Esteban Peñaranda	1866
90	Dámaso Pineda	1867-1868
	Dámaso Pineda	1869
91	Benito Ferrariz	1870-1871
92	Alejo Pineda	1872-1873
93	Nicolasito Paranga	1874-1875
94	Felipe Parreño	1876-1877
95	José Mendoza	1878
96	Cayetano Bolívar	1879
97	León Fernando Nograles	1880-1881
98	Vicente Parreñas	1882
99	Justo Nograles	1883
100	Barcelio Peñaranda	1884
101	Pedro Belasa	1885
102	Cayetano Bolívar	1886-1887
103	Vicente Peñaflorida	1888
104	Tomás Pulmones	1889
105	Cayetano Bolívar	1890-1891
106	Hilario Magbanua	1892-1893

==== Capitán municipal ====
In 1893, the Maura Law was passed to reorganize town governments with the aim of making them more effective and autonomous. The law changed the title of chief executive of the town from gobernadorcillo to capitán municipal.

Order	Name	Years in Office
107	Julián Ubaldo	1894
108	Maurilio Mendoza	1895-1900

==== Presidentes & vice presidentes municipal ====
Order	Presidente municipal	Years in Office	Order	Vice presidente municipal	Years in Office
109	Mariano Peñaflorida	1900-1904	1		
110	Rafael Parcon	1904-1906			
111	Magdaleno Silva	1906-1907			
112	Ceferino Palabrica	1907-1908			
113	Matias Yusay	1908-1909			
114	Ceferino Palabrica	1909-1913			
115	Generoso Solinap	1913-1916			
116	Tomás Peñaflorida	1916-1919			
117	Primitivo Ledesma	1919-1922		Paulino Pérez	
118	Manuel Mendoza	1922-1925			
119	Generoso Solinap	1925-1928			
120	Sofronio Daguay	1928-1931			
121	Nemesio Cordero	1931-1933			

==== Municipal Mayors ====
Order	Mayor	Years in Office	Order	Vice-mayor	Years in Office
122	Fernando Parcon	1933-1936		Silverio Quesaba	
123	Mariano Peñaflorida	1936-1945			
	Tomás Ferrariz (Japanese Puppet Mayor)	1942-1945			
124	Fortunato Camarista	1946-1951			
125	Roque Mosquera	1951			
126	Fortunato Camarista	1952-1955			
127	Florentino Perez	1956-1960			
128	Santiago Puig	1960-1962			
129	Manuel Parcon	1963-1998			
130	Licurgo Tirador	1998-2001		Peter Parcon	
131	Manuel Parcon	2001-2002		Pablo Perez	
132	Pablo Perez	2002-2013			
133	Tomas Peñaflorida	2013-2019		Joselito Romualdo Ilisan	
134	Rafael Enrique Lazaro	2019–present			

=== Municipal officials ===
The elected municipal officials of the local government unit of Pototan, Iloilo for 2025-2028.

Local Government Unit of Pototan
Representative
Lorenz R. Defensor (NUP)	
Mayor
Rafael Enrique P. Lazaro (PFP)	
Vice Mayor
Romualdo Joselito M. Ilisan (AKBYN)	
Sangguniang Bayan Members
Paolo Lorenzo L. Tirador (PFP)	Mark Angelo C. Perez (PFP)
Kirk P. Pedrajas (AKBYN)	Ma. Concepcion Q. Dayot-Sumergido (Lakas)
Nonito Q. Pasuelo Jr. (AKBYN)	Eugenio Rodrigo J. Palu-ay (PFP)
Donnabelle S. Mendoza (AKBYN)	Reynaldo E. Umalay Jr. (AKBYN)
ABC President
Sherwin S. Peñaranda
SK Federation President
Verna Angelique G. Pastolero

== Notable personalities ==
- Espiridion Guanco – first President pro tempore of the Senate of the Philippines and Secretary to Senate President Manuel L. Quezon.
