= Lambunao =

Municipality in Iloilo, Philippines

- Municipality
- Municipality of Lambunao
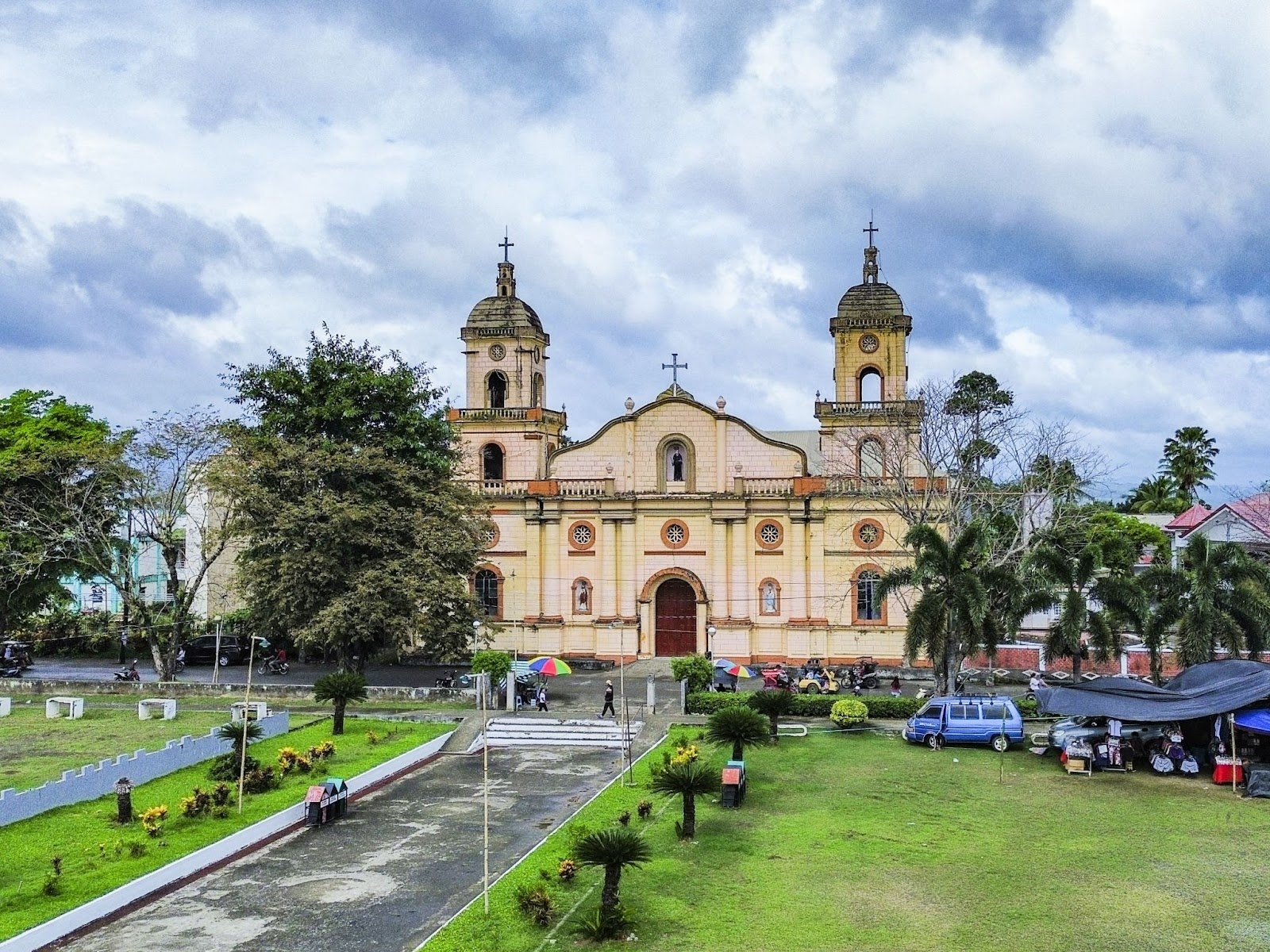
- St. Nicholas of Tolentine Parish

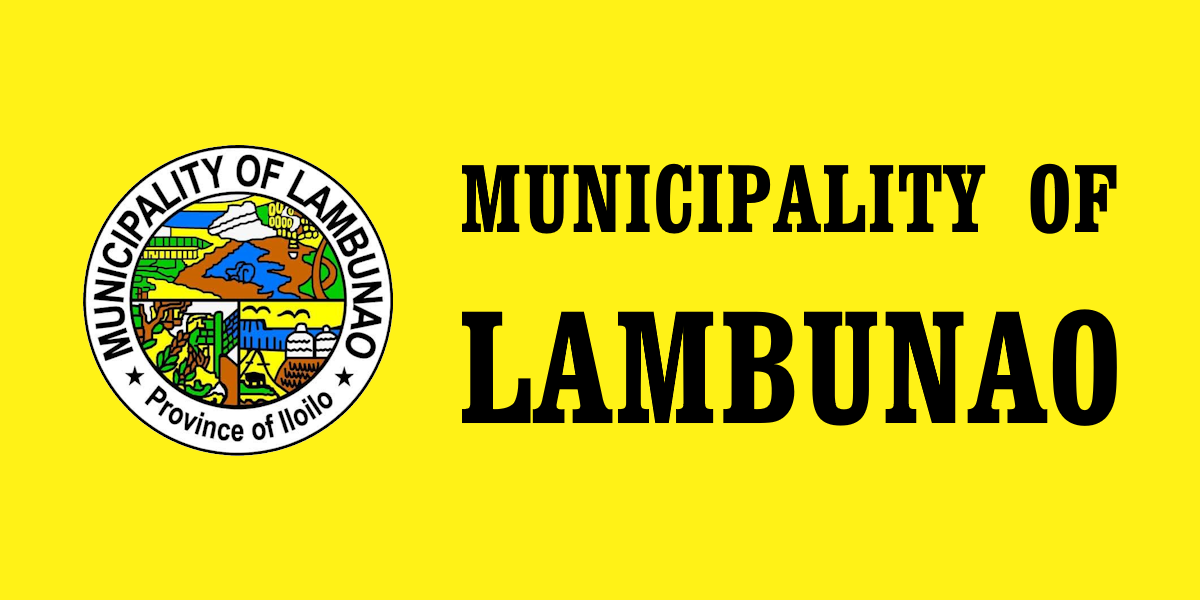
- Flag

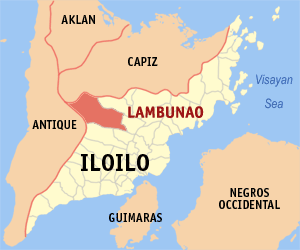
- Map of Iloilo with Lambunao highlighted
- Interactive map of Lambunao
- Location within the Philippines
- Coordinates: 11°03′N 122°29′E
- Country: Philippines
- Region: Western Visayas
- Province: Iloilo
- District: 3rd district
- Barangays: 73 (see Barangays)

Government
  - Type: Sangguniang Bayan
  - Mayor: Reynor R. Gonzales (PFP)
  - Vice Mayor: Arvin L. Losaria (PFP)
  - Representative: Lorenz R. Defensor (NUP)
  - Municipal Council: Members: Rodel T. Carmen (Nacionalista); Carl Clint J. Lingaya (PFP); Noel O. Latigay, Jr. (Ind); Mary Grace N. Suganob (PFP); Mae Claire E. Letrero (PFP); Stephen Lee L. Mandarero (Nacionalista); Cesar L. Gonzales (PFP); Hempson L. Ycaza (Ind); Kenneth John Lenaming ^{‡}; Marian Sarrah Mae Semolava ^{◌}; ‡ ex officio ABC president; ◌ ex officio SK chairman
  - Electorate: 43,548 voters (2025)

Area
  - Total: 407.09 km^{2} (157.18 sq mi)
- Elevation: 112 m (367 ft)
- Highest elevation: 281 m (922 ft)
- Lowest elevation: 62 m (203 ft)

Population (2024 census)
  - Total: 80,724
  - Density: 198.30/km^{2} (513.58/sq mi)
  - Households: 19,212

Economy
  - Income class: 1st municipal income class
  - Poverty incidence: 19.86% (2023)
  - Revenue: ₱ 341.3 million (2024)
  - Assets: ₱ 827.8 million (2024)
  - Expenditure: ₱ 286.2 million (2024)
  - Liabilities: ₱ 259.7 million (2024)

Service provider
  - Electricity: Iloilo 2 Electric Cooperative (ILECO 2)
- Time zone: UTC+8 (PST)
- ZIP code: 5042
- PSGC: 063025000
- IDD : area code: +63 (0)33
- Native languages: Sulod; Karay-a; Hiligaynon; Capisnon; Tagalog
- Website: www.lambunao.gov.ph

Lambunao, officially the Municipality of Lambunao (Kinaray-a: Banwa kang Lambunao, Hiligaynon: Banwa sang Lambunao, Tagalog: Bayan ng Lambunao), is a municipality in the province of Iloilo, Philippines. According to the 2024 census, it has a population of 80,724 people.

Lambunao is the largest municipality in Iloilo in terms of land area and is 47 kilometres (29 mi) from Iloilo City.

== Geography ==
=== Barangays ===
Lambunao is politically subdivided into 73 barangays. Each barangay consists of puroks and some have sitios.

- Agsirab
- Agtuman
- Alugmawa
- Badiangan
- Bagongbong
- Balagiao
- Banban
- Bansag
- Bayuco
- Binaba-an Armada
- Binaba-an Labayno
- Binaba-an Limoso
- Binaba-an Portigo
- Binaba-an Tirador
- Bonbon
- Bontoc
- Buri
- Burirao
- Buwang
- Cabatangan
- Cabugao
- Cabunlawan
- Caguisanan
- Caloy-ahan
- Caninguan
- Capangyan
- Cayan Este
- Cayan Oeste
- Corot-on
- Coto
- Cubay
- Cunarum
- Daanbanwa
- Gines
- Hipgos
- Jayubo
- Jorog
- Lanot Grande
- Lanot Pequeño
- Legayada
- Lumanay (Daanbanwa I)
- Madarag
- Magbato
- Maite Grande
- Maite Pequeño
- Malag-it
- Manaulan
- Maribong
- Marong
- Misi
- Natividad
- Pajo
- Pandan
- Panuran
- Pasig
- Patag
- Poblacion Ilawod
- Poblacion Ilaya
- Poong
- Pughanan
- Pungsod
- Quiling
- Sagcup
- San Gregorio
- Sibacungan
- Sibaguan
- Simsiman
- Supoc
- Tampucao
- Tranghawan
- Tubungan
- Tuburan
- Walang

=== Climate ===
Climate data for Lambunao, Iloilo
Month	Jan	Feb	Mar	Apr	May	Jun	Jul	Aug	Sep	Oct	Nov	Dec	Year
Mean daily maximum °C (°F)	29 (84)	30 (86)	32 (90)	33 (91)	31 (88)	30 (86)	29 (84)	29 (84)	29 (84)	29 (84)	29 (84)	29 (84)	30 (86)
Mean daily minimum °C (°F)	22 (72)	22 (72)	22 (72)	23 (73)	25 (77)	25 (77)	24 (75)	24 (75)	24 (75)	24 (75)	23 (73)	22 (72)	23 (74)
Average precipitation mm (inches)	48 (1.9)	41 (1.6)	58 (2.3)	82 (3.2)	223 (8.8)	300 (11.8)	346 (13.6)	307 (12.1)	311 (12.2)	292 (11.5)	167 (6.6)	81 (3.2)	2,256 (88.8)
Average rainy days	11.4	7.7	11.3	15.4	25.7	28.5	29.5	28.7	28.3	28.7	21.8	15.2	252.2
Source: Meteoblue

== Demographics ==
Population census of Lambunao
Year	Pop.	±% p.a.
1903	6,661	—
1918	13,120	+4.62%
1939	23,249	+2.76%
1948	26,099	+1.29%
1960	31,504	+1.58%
1970	36,630	+1.52%
1975	42,537	+3.04%
1980	45,435	+1.33%
1990	55,325	+1.99%
1995	58,792	+1.15%
2000	61,084	+0.82%
2007	63,300	+0.49%
2010	69,023	+3.20%
2015	73,640	+1.24%
2020	81,236	+2.09%
2024	80,724	−0.15%
Source: Philippine Statistics Authority

In the 2024 census, the population of Lambunao was 80,724 people, with a density of 200 inhabitants per square kilometre or 520 inhabitants per square mile.

== Economy ==
Poverty incidence of Lambunao (%)

Source: Philippine Statistics Authority
