= 2017 Palarong Pambansa =

Multi-sports competition

60th Palarong Pambansa
- Host city: San Jose de Buenavista, Antique (main)
- Country: Philippines
- Motto: Converges Youth Power; builds sustainable future.
- Teams: 18 regional athletic associations
- Athletes: 12,000+ athletes
- Opening: 23 April
- Closing: 29 April
- Opened by: President Rodrigo Duterte
- Torch lighter: Marian Capadocia
- Main venue: Binirayan Sports Complex
- Website: www.antiquepalaro2017.com

The 2017 Palarong Pambansa was the 60th edition of the Palarong Pambansa and was held from April 23 to 29, 2017 in Antique. Student athletes from 18 athletic associations representing the 18 regions of the Philippines competed in different sporting events and disciplines.

== Bidding ==
Two provinces remained after Negros Occidental, Cebu and Iloilo backed-out of the bid to host the annual multi-sports event in 2017 due to budget difficulties, San Jose de Buenavista, Antique and Dumaguete showed interest in hosting the event and officially submitted their respective bids to the Palarong Pambansa bids and selection committee. On November 18, 2016, the Palarong Pambansa Selection Committee voted to choose the official host of the next Palarong Pambansa. San Jose de Buenavista, Antique won with 5 votes against 4 for Dumaguete and was officially declared the host of Palarong Pambansa 2017.

2017 Palarong Pambansa bids
City/Municipality	Province/Region	Votes
San Jose de Buenavista	Antique/R-6	5
Dumaguete	Negros Oriental/R-7	4
Bacolod	Negros Occidental/R-6	Withdrawn from Bidding
Cebu City	Cebu/R-7	Withdrawn from Bidding
Iloilo City	Iloilo/R-6	Withdrawn from Bidding

Winning bid

== Plan for the games ==
Antique's bid includes plans to renovate and upgrade the rubberized track oval and other facilities inside the Binirayan Sports Complex in San Jose de Buenavista, which will be the main venue of the games. Several indoor sporting events will be held at the University of Antique in the town of Sibalom, St. Anthony's College in San Jose de Buenavista, and other covered courts located within the 40-kilometer radius around the capital town.

The province of Antique was awarded the rights to host the games by the DepEd Palarong Pambansa Selection Committee after it outbid Dumaguete, Negros Oriental by a single vote.

The Games was originally scheduled to be held from April 10 to 16, 2017 but was moved to April 23 to 29, 2017 due to the original schedule coinciding with Holy Week observances. This would be the first time for Antique to host the event.

=== Sports ===
==== Regular sports ====
Futsal is elevated from being a demonstration sport and will be played as a regular sports discipline for the first time. Dancesport, Pencak Silat, and Aerobic Gymnastics will be introduced as demonstration sports in the games.

- Archery
- Arnis
- Aquatics
- Athletics
- Badminton
- Baseball
- Basketball
- Boxing
- Chess
- Football
- Futsal
- Gymnastics
- Sepak takraw (Boys)
- Softball
- Table tennis
- Taekwondo
- Tennis
- Volleyball

==== Demonstration Sports ====
These are the seven demonstration sports for this year's Palarong Pambansa. Futsal was elevated as a regular sports discipline starting this edition of the games. Dancesport, Pencak Silat, and Aerobic Gymnastics will be introduced as demonstration sports in the games.

- Aerobic Gymnastics
- Billiards
- Dancesport
- Pencak Silat
- Sepak takraw (Girls)
- Wrestling
- Wushu

==== Special Para Games ====
These are the four sports with various events to be contested at this games:

- Swimming
- Bocce
- Goalball
- Athletics

=== Participating regions ===
A total of 18 athletic associations coming from 18 regions of the country participated in the athletic meet.

Host Region

Regions
Code	Name	Colors
ARMMAA	Autonomous Region in Muslim Mindanao	
CARAA	Cordillera Administrative Region	
NCRAA	National Capital Region	
IRAA	Region I or Ilocos Region	
CAVRAA	Region II or Cagayan Valley	
CLRAA	Region III or Central Luzon	
STCAA	Region IV-A or Southern Tagalog - Calabarzon	
MRAA (MimaropaA)	Region IV-B or Southern Tagalog - Mimaropa	
BRAA	Region V or Bicol Region	
WVRAA	Region VI or Western Visayas	
CVRAA	Region VII Central Visayas	
EVRAA	Region VIII or Eastern Visayas	
ZPRAA	Region IX or Zamboanga Peninsula	
NMRAA	Region X or Northern Mindanao	
DAVRAA	Region XI or Davao Region	
SRAA	Region XII or Soccsksargen	
Caraga	Region XIII or Caraga	
NIRAA	Region XVIII or Negros Island Region	

== Playing Venues ==
At least 31 different locations were selected as the playing venues for the 26 sports discipline of the games.

Regular Events
Event	Venue	Municipality
Archery	Pis-anan National High School Track Oval	Sibalom
Arnis	Patnongon Municipal Gym	Patnongon
Aquatics	Binirayan Swimming Pool	San Jose de Buenavista
Athletics	Binirayan Sports Complex	San Jose de Buenavista
Badminton	St. Anthony's College De Wit Hall	San Jose de Buenavista
Baseball	Camp Gen. Leandro Fullon	San Jose de Buenavista
Basketball	Binirayan Sports Complex; Binirayan Sports Complex Covered Gym; Brgy. San Pedro Gym	San Jose de Buenavista
Basketball	San Remigio Municipal Gym; St. Vincent's High School Gym	San Remigio
Boxing	EBJ Freedom Park	San Jose de Buenavista
Chess	University of Antique Library	San Jose de Buenavista
Football	Belison Football Field	Belison
Football	Binirayan Sports Complex; Saint Anthony's College Grounds	San Remigio
Football	Gov. Julian Fullon Pacificador National HS	Hamtic
Football	University of Antique Grounds	Sibalom
Futsal	Binirayan Sports Complex (Indoor)	San Jose de Buenavista
Futsal	Hamtic Basketball Court	Hamtic
Gymnastics	Binirayan Sports Complex	San Jose de Buenavista
Sepak takraw	Angel Salazar Jr. School Covered Court; Diosdado Macapagal Trade Center Gym; Brgy. San Fernando Gym	San Jose de Buenavista
Sepak takraw	Malandog Elementary School	Hamtic
Softball	Camp Gen. Leandro Fullon	San Jose de Buenavista
Table tennis	Antique Electric Cooperative Covered Gym	San Jose de Buenavista
Taekwondo	Belison Municipal Gym	Belison
Tennis	Binirayan Sports Complex; Brgy. San Pedro Sports Plaza	San Jose de Buenavista
Volleyball	St. Anthony's College Bishop Martirez Hall	San Jose de Buenavista
Volleyball	Brgy. Egaña Gym; Sta. Rita Academy Gym; Sibalom Municipal Gym; University of Antique Gym	Sibalom

Demonstration Sports
Event	Venue	Municipality
* Billiards	Robinson's Place Mall Antique	San Jose de Buenavista
Wushu	Villavert-Jimenez Gym	Hamtic
Wrestling	Hamtic Central Elementary School Covered Gym	Hamtic
Dancesport	Antique National High School Covered Gym	San Jose de Buenavista
Pencak Silat	Binirayan Sports Complex Covered Gym	San Jose de Buenavista

Special Para Events
Event	Venue	Municipality
Aquatics; Bocce; Goalball; Track Events	Antique SPED Center; Binirayan Sports Complex	San Jose de Buenavista

== Billeting Areas ==
Several public and private elementary, secondary and tertiary schools, colleges and university situated from the towns near the provincial capital San Jose de Buenavista were selected as the billeting areas for delegates and officials of the games.

Host Region

Billeting Areas
Athletic Association Code	Region	Billeting Area	Location
ARMMAA	Autonomous Region in Muslim Mindanao	Angel Salazar Jr. Memorial School	San Jose de Buenavista
CARAA	Cordillera Administrative Region	Saint Anthony's College - Grade School	San Jose de Buenavista
NCRAA	National Capital Region	Antique Vocational School	Bugasong
IRAA	Region I - Ilocos Region	Sibalom Elementary School	Sibalom
IRAA	Region I - Ilocos Region	Sibalom National High School	Sibalom
CAVRAA	Region II - Cagayan Valley	Bugasong Central School	Bugasong
CLRAA	Region III - Central Luzon	Moscoso Rios Elementary School	Hamtic
CLRAA	Region III - Central Luzon	Moscoso Rios National High School	Hamtic
STCAA	Region IV-A - Southern Tagalog - Calabarzon	Pis-anan Elementary School	Sibalom
STCAA	Region IV-A - Southern Tagalog - Calabarzon	Pis-anan National High School	Sibalom
MRAA (MimaropaA)	Region IV-B - Southern Tagalog - Mimaropa	Belison Central Elementary School	Belison
MRAA (MimaropaA)	Region IV-B - Southern Tagalog - Mimaropa	Belison National High School	Belison
BRAA	Region V - Bicol Region	Assemblyman Segundo Moscoso Memorial Elementary School	San Jose de Buenavista
BRAA	Region V - Bicol Region	San Pedro National High School	San Jose de Buenavista
WVRAA	Region VI - Western Visayas	Saint Anthony's College - High School Department	San Jose de Buenavista
WVRAA	Region VI - Western Visayas	Saint Anthony's College	San Jose de Buenavista
CVRAA	Region VII - Central Visayas	University of Antique - Sibalom Campus	Sibalom
EVRAA	Region VIII - Eastern Visayas	Aureliana Elementary School	Patnongon
EVRAA	Region VIII - Eastern Visayas	Aureliana National High School	Patnongon
ZPRAA	Region IX - Zamboanga Peninsula	University of Antique - Sibalom Campus	Sibalom
NMRAA	Region X - Northern Mindanao	Col. Abellon Memorial Elementary School	Patnongon
NMRAA	Region X - Northern Mindanao	St. Augustine's Academy	Patnongon
DAVRAA	Region XI - Davao Region	Gov. Julian Pacificador National High School	Sibalom
SRAA	Region XII - Soccsksargen	Egaña Elementary School; Egaña National High School	Sibalom
SRAA	Region XII - Soccsksargen	Buhang Elementary School; Buhang National High School	Hamtic
Caraga	Region XIII - Caraga	Carit-an Central Elementary School	Patnongon
Caraga	Region XIII - Caraga	Lerio Escaño Memorial National High School	Patnongon
NIRAA	Region XVIII - Negros Island Region	Tobias Fornier Central Elementary School	Tobias Fornier
NIRAA	Region XVIII - Negros Island Region	Dao Catholic School	Tobias Fornier
	Technical Officials	Antique National High School	San Jose de Buenavista

== Official Medal Tally ==
=== Regular Games ===
As of 29 April 2017, 12:38 (UTC+8)

* Host nation ( Western Visayas (WVRAA))

Rank	Region	Gold	Silver	Bronze	Total
1	National Capital Region (NCRAA)	98	66	45	209
2	Calabarzon/Southern Tagalog (STCAA)	41	57	57	155
3	Western Visayas (WVRAA)*	38	29	40	107
4	Negros Island Region (NIRAA)	26	27	36	89
5	Soccsksargen (SRAA)	26	22	35	83
6	Cordillera Administrative Region (CARAA)	26	21	21	68
7	Davao Region (DavRAA)	22	25	24	71
8	Northern Mindanao (NMRAA)	20	20	42	82
9	Central Visayas (CVIRAA)	20	18	29	67
10	Central Luzon (CLRAA)	15	18	28	61
11	Bicol Region (BRAA)	9	18	34	61
12	Cagayan Valley (CaVRAA)	7	15	14	36
13	Ilocos Region (IRAA)	7	12	31	50
14	Caraga (CARAGARAA)	7	12	15	34
15	Eastern Visayas (EVRAA)	7	5	18	30
16	Zamboanga Peninsula (ZPRAA)	5	0	17	22
17	Mimaropa (MRAA)	2	8	7	17
18	Autonomous Region in Muslim Mindanao (ARMMAA)	1	4	4	9
Totals (18 entries)		377	377	497	1,251

=== Demo Sports ===
* Host nation ( Western Visayas (WVRAA))

Rank	Nation	Gold	Silver	Bronze	Total
1	Central Visayas (CVIRAA)	16	16	10	42
2	Davao Region (DavRAA)	10	2	9	21
3	National Capital Region (NCRAA)	9	12	4	25
4	Western Visayas (WVRAA)*	5	2	3	10
5	Negros Island Region (NIRAA)	2	0	2	4
6	Zamboanga Peninsula (ZPRAA)	1	1	1	3
7	Calabarzon/Southern Tagalog (STCAA)	0	4	4	8
8	Soccsksargen (SRAA)	0	3	8	11
9	Cagayan Valley (CaVRAA)	0	1	1	2
10	Cordillera Administrative Region (CARAA)	0	1	0	1
11	Autonomous Region in Muslim Mindanao (ARMMAA)	0	0	2	2
11	Ilocos Region (IRAA)	0	0	2	2
13	Eastern Visayas (EVRAA)	0	0	1	1
14	Bicol Region (BRAA)	0	0	0	0
14	Caraga (CARAGARAA)	0	0	0	0
14	Central Luzon (CLRAA)	0	0	0	0
14	Mimaropa (MRAA)	0	0	0	0
14	Northern Mindanao (NMRAA)	0	0	0	0
Totals (18 entries)		43	42	47	132

=== Para Games ===
* Host nation ( Western Visayas (WVRAA))

Rank	Nation	Gold	Silver	Bronze	Total
1	Calabarzon/Southern Tagalog (STCAA)	24	5	9	38
2	Western Visayas (WVRAA)*	19	10	12	41
3	Davao Region (DavRAA)	7	6	11	24
4	Northern Mindanao (NMRAA)	7	2	2	11
5	National Capital Region (NCRAA)	6	6	8	20
6	Zamboanga Peninsula (ZPRAA)	6	6	0	12
7	Ilocos Region (IRAA)	2	9	6	17
8	Bicol Region (BRAA)	2	5	2	9
9	Negros Island Region (NIRAA)	1	8	5	14
10	Mimaropa (MRAA)	1	3	3	7
11	Caraga (CARAGARAA)	0	2	2	4
12	Cordillera Administrative Region (CARAA)	0	2	0	2
12	Soccsksargen (SRAA)	0	2	0	2
14	Central Luzon (CLRAA)	0	0	1	1
15	Autonomous Region in Muslim Mindanao (ARMMAA)	0	0	0	0
15	Cagayan Valley (CaVRAA)	0	0	0	0
15	Central Visayas (CVIRAA)	0	0	0	0
15	Eastern Visayas (EVRAA)	0	0	0	0
Totals (18 entries)		75	66	61	202
