= Iloilo's 3rd congressional district =

Legislative district of the Philippines

- Constituency for the House of Representatives of the Philippines
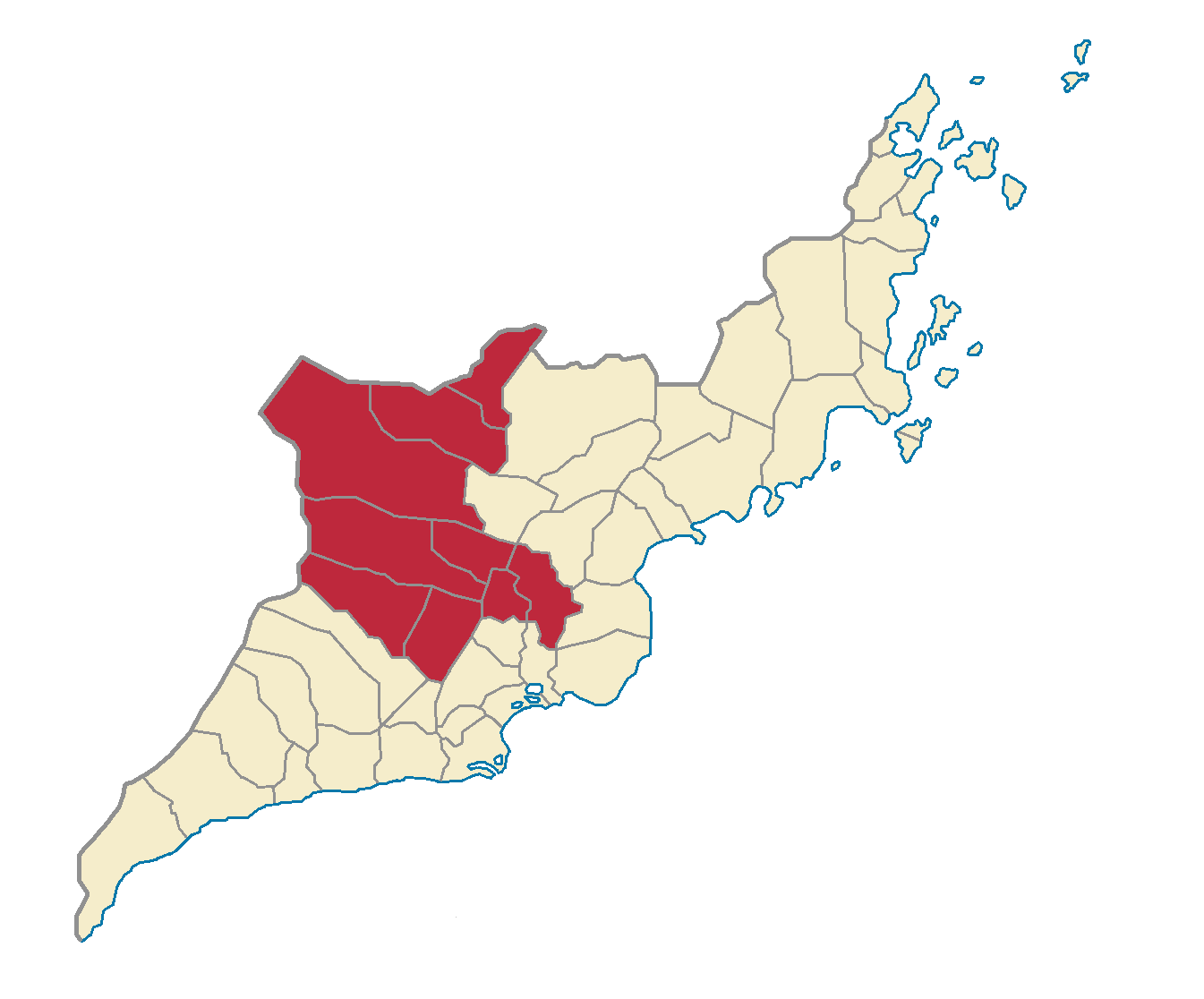
- Boundary of Iloilo's 3rd congressional district in Iloilo

- Location of Iloilo within the Philippines
- Province: Iloilo
- Region: Western Visayas
- Population: 456,006 (2020)
- Electorate: 273,797 (2022)
- Major settlements: 9 LGUs: Municipalities; Badiangan; Bingawan; Cabatuan; Calinog; Janiuay; Lambunao; Maasin; Mina; Pototan
- Area: 1,405.43 km^{2} (542.64 sq mi)

Current constituency
- Created: 1907
- Representative: Lorenz Defensor
- Political party: NUP
- Congressional bloc: Majority

Iloilo's 3rd congressional district is one of the five congressional districts of the Philippines in the province of Iloilo. It has been represented in the House of Representatives of the Philippines since 1916 and earlier in the Philippine Assembly from 1907 to 1916. The district consists of the northwestern and central municipalities of Badiangan, Bingawan, Cabatuan, Calinog, Janiuay, Lambunao, Maasin, Mina and Pototan. It is currently represented in the 20th Congress by Lorenz Defensor of the National Unity Party (NUP).

Prior to its second dissolution in 1972, the district encompassed the central Iloilo municipalities of Badiangan, Cabatuan, Janiuay, Leon, New Lucena, Maasin, San Miguel, Santa Barbara, and Zarraga.

== Representation history ==
#	Image	Member	Term of office		Legislature	Party	Electoral history	Constituent LGUs
#	Image	Member	Start	End	Legislature	Party	Electoral history	Constituent LGUs
=== Iloilo's 3rd district for the Philippine Assembly ===
District created January 9, 1907.
1		Salvador Laguda	October 16, 1907	October 16, 1909	1st	Progresista	Elected in 1907.	1907–1916; Cabatuan, Leon, Santa Barbara
2		José López Vito	October 16, 1909	October 16, 1912	2nd	Progresista	Elected in 1909.	1907–1916; Cabatuan, Leon, Santa Barbara
3		Ernesto Gustilo	October 16, 1912	October 16, 1916	3rd	Independent	Elected in 1912.	1907–1916; Cabatuan, Leon, Santa Barbara
=== Iloilo's 3rd district for the House of Representatives of the Philippine Islands ===
4		Nicanor Gregorius	October 16, 1916	June 3, 1919	4th	Progresista	Elected in 1916.	1916–1919; Cabatuan, Leon, San Miguel, Santa Barbara
5		José E. Locsin	June 3, 1919	June 6, 1922	5th	Nacionalista	Elected in 1919.	1919–1922; Cabatuan, Leon, Maasin, San Miguel, Santa Barbara
6		Tomás Confesor	June 6, 1922	June 2, 1931	6th	Nacionalista; Colectivista	Elected in 1922.	1922–1935; Cabatuan, Janiuay, Leon, Maasin, San Miguel, Santa Barbara
6		Tomás Confesor	June 6, 1922	June 2, 1931	7th	Nacionalista; Consolidado	Re-elected in 1925.	1922–1935; Cabatuan, Janiuay, Leon, Maasin, San Miguel, Santa Barbara
6		Tomás Confesor	June 6, 1922	June 2, 1931	8th	Nacionalista; Consolidado	Re-elected in 1928.	1922–1935; Cabatuan, Janiuay, Leon, Maasin, San Miguel, Santa Barbara
7		Silvestre Villa	June 2, 1931	November 3, 1933	9th	Nacionalista; Consolidado	Elected in 1931. Died.	1922–1935; Cabatuan, Janiuay, Leon, Maasin, San Miguel, Santa Barbara
8		Atanasio Ampig	June 5, 1934	September 16, 1935	10th	Nacionalista; Demócrata Pro-Independencia	Elected in 1934.	1922–1935; Cabatuan, Janiuay, Leon, Maasin, San Miguel, Santa Barbara
#	Image	Member	Term of office		National Assembly	Party	Electoral history	Constituent LGUs
#	Image	Member	Start	End	National Assembly	Party	Electoral history	Constituent LGUs
=== Iloilo's 3rd district for the National Assembly (Commonwealth of the Philippines) ===
(6)		Tomás Confesor	September 16, 1935	December 30, 1938	1st	Nacionalista; Democrático	Elected in 1935.	1935–1941; Cabatuan, Janiuay, Leon, Maasin, San Miguel, Santa Barbara
(8)		Atanasio Ampig	December 30, 1938	December 17, 1941	2nd	Nacionalista	Elected in 1938. Died.	1935–1941; Cabatuan, Janiuay, Leon, Maasin, San Miguel, Santa Barbara
District dissolved into the two-seat Iloilo's at-large district and the two-seat Iloilo City's at-large district for the National Assembly (Second Philippine Republic).
#	Image	Member	Term of office		Common wealth Congress	Party	Electoral history	Constituent LGUs
#	Image	Member	Start	End	Common wealth Congress	Party	Electoral history	Constituent LGUs
=== Iloilo's 3rd district for the House of Representatives of the Commonwealth of the Philippines ===
District re-created May 24, 1945.
9		Tiburcio Lutero	June 9, 1945	May 25, 1946	1st	Nacionalista	Elected in 1941.	1945–1946; Cabatuan, Janiuay, Leon, Maasin, San Miguel, Santa Barbara, Zarraga
#	Image	Member	Term of office		Congress	Party	Electoral history	Constituent LGUs
#	Image	Member	Start	End	Congress	Party	Electoral history	Constituent LGUs
=== Iloilo's 3rd district for the House of Representatives of the Philippines ===
(9)		Tiburcio Lutero	May 29, 1946	December 30, 1949	1st	Liberal	Re-elected in 1946.	1946–1949; Cabatuan, Janiuay, Leon, Maasin, San Miguel, Santa Barbara, Zarraga
10		Patricio V. Confesor	December 30, 1949	December 30, 1953	2nd	Nacionalista	Elected in 1949.	1949–1957; Cabatuan, Janiuay, Leon, Lucena, Maasin, San Miguel, Santa Barbara, Zarraga
11		Ramón C. Tabiana	December 30, 1953	November 10, 1955	3rd	Liberal	Elected in 1953.	1949–1957; Cabatuan, Janiuay, Leon, Lucena, Maasin, San Miguel, Santa Barbara, Zarraga
12		Domitilo G. Abordo	December 30, 1957	December 30, 1961	4th	Nacionalista	Elected in 1957.	1957–1969; Cabatuan, Janiuay, Leon, New Lucena, Maasin, San Miguel, Santa Barbara, Zarraga
(11)		Ramón C. Tabiana	December 30, 1961	December 20, 1964	5th	Liberal	Elected in 1961. Died.	1957–1969; Cabatuan, Janiuay, Leon, New Lucena, Maasin, San Miguel, Santa Barbara, Zarraga
13		Gloria Tabiana	November 9, 1965	September 23, 1972	5th	Liberal	Elected in 1965 to finish her husband's term.	1957–1969; Cabatuan, Janiuay, Leon, New Lucena, Maasin, San Miguel, Santa Barbara, Zarraga
13		Gloria Tabiana	November 9, 1965	September 23, 1972	6th	Liberal	Re-elected in 1965.	1957–1969; Cabatuan, Janiuay, Leon, New Lucena, Maasin, San Miguel, Santa Barbara, Zarraga
13		Gloria Tabiana	November 9, 1965	September 23, 1972	7th	Nacionalista	Re-elected in 1969. Removed from office after imposition of martial law.	1969–1972; Badiangan, Cabatuan, Janiuay, Leon, New Lucena, Maasin, San Miguel, Santa Barbara, Zarraga
District dissolved into the sixteen-seat Region VI's at-large district for the Interim Batasang Pambansa, followed by the five-seat Iloilo's at-large district for the Regular Batasang Pambansa.
District re-created February 2, 1987.
14		Licurgo P. Tirador	June 30, 1987	June 30, 1998	8th	Liberal	Elected in 1987.	1987–present Badiangan, Bingawan, Cabatuan, Calinog, Janiuay, Lambunao, Maasin, Mina, Pototan
14		Licurgo P. Tirador	June 30, 1987	June 30, 1998	9th	Lakas	Re-elected in 1992.	1987–present Badiangan, Bingawan, Cabatuan, Calinog, Janiuay, Lambunao, Maasin, Mina, Pototan
14		Licurgo P. Tirador	June 30, 1987	June 30, 1998	10th	Lakas	Re-elected in 1995.	1987–present Badiangan, Bingawan, Cabatuan, Calinog, Janiuay, Lambunao, Maasin, Mina, Pototan
15		Manuel P. Parcon	June 30, 1998	June 30, 2001	11th	Lakas	Elected in 1998.	1987–present Badiangan, Bingawan, Cabatuan, Calinog, Janiuay, Lambunao, Maasin, Mina, Pototan
16		Arthur Defensor Sr.	June 30, 2001	June 30, 2010	12th	Lakas	Elected in 2001.	1987–present Badiangan, Bingawan, Cabatuan, Calinog, Janiuay, Lambunao, Maasin, Mina, Pototan
16		Arthur Defensor Sr.	June 30, 2001	June 30, 2010	13th	Lakas	Re-elected in 2004.	1987–present Badiangan, Bingawan, Cabatuan, Calinog, Janiuay, Lambunao, Maasin, Mina, Pototan
16		Arthur Defensor Sr.	June 30, 2001	June 30, 2010	14th	Lakas	Re-elected in 2007.	1987–present Badiangan, Bingawan, Cabatuan, Calinog, Janiuay, Lambunao, Maasin, Mina, Pototan
17		Arthur Defensor Jr.	June 30, 2010	June 30, 2019	15th	Liberal	Elected in 2010.	1987–present Badiangan, Bingawan, Cabatuan, Calinog, Janiuay, Lambunao, Maasin, Mina, Pototan
17		Arthur Defensor Jr.	June 30, 2010	June 30, 2019	16th	Liberal	Re-elected in 2013.	1987–present Badiangan, Bingawan, Cabatuan, Calinog, Janiuay, Lambunao, Maasin, Mina, Pototan
17		Arthur Defensor Jr.	June 30, 2010	June 30, 2019	17th	PDP–Laban	Re-elected in 2016.	1987–present Badiangan, Bingawan, Cabatuan, Calinog, Janiuay, Lambunao, Maasin, Mina, Pototan
18		Lorenz R. Defensor	June 30, 2019	Incumbent	18th	PDP–Laban	Elected in 2019.	1987–present Badiangan, Bingawan, Cabatuan, Calinog, Janiuay, Lambunao, Maasin, Mina, Pototan
18		Lorenz R. Defensor	June 30, 2019	Incumbent	19th	NUP	Re-elected in 2022.	1987–present Badiangan, Bingawan, Cabatuan, Calinog, Janiuay, Lambunao, Maasin, Mina, Pototan

== Election results ==
=== 2016 ===
2016 Philippine House of Representatives elections
Party	Candidate	Votes	%
Liberal	Arthur Defensor Jr.	148,941	
Invalid or blank votes		38,616	
Total votes		187,557	
Liberal hold			

=== 2013 ===
2013 Philippine House of Representatives elections
Party	Candidate	Votes	%
Liberal	Arthur Defensor Jr.	96,514	71.87
UNA	Francis Lavilla	23,394	17.42
Margin of victory		73,120	54.45%
Invalid or blank votes		14,377	10.71
Total votes		134,285	100.00
Liberal hold			

=== 2010 ===
2010 Philippine House of Representatives elections
Party	Candidate	Votes	%
Lakas–Kampi	Arthur Defensor Jr.	89,960	55.59
Liberal	Rene Villa	54,117	33.44
PMP	Zafiro Lauron	17,755	10.97
Valid ballots		161,832	94.75
Invalid or blank votes		8,964	5.24
Total votes		170,796	100.00
Lakas–Kampi hold			

=== 1965 ===
1965 Iloilo's 3rd congressional district special election/1965 Philippine House of Representatives election at Iloilo's 3rd congressional district
Candidate	Party	Votes	%
Gloria Tabiana	Liberal Party	30,761	55.99
Domitilo Abordo	Nacionalista Party	24,156	43.97
Severino Simundo	Republican Party (independent)	20	0.04
Total		54,937	100.00
Liberal Party hold			
Source: COMELEC

== See also ==
- Legislative districts of Iloilo
