= New Lucena =

Municipality in Iloilo, Philippines

- Municipality
- Municipality of New Lucena
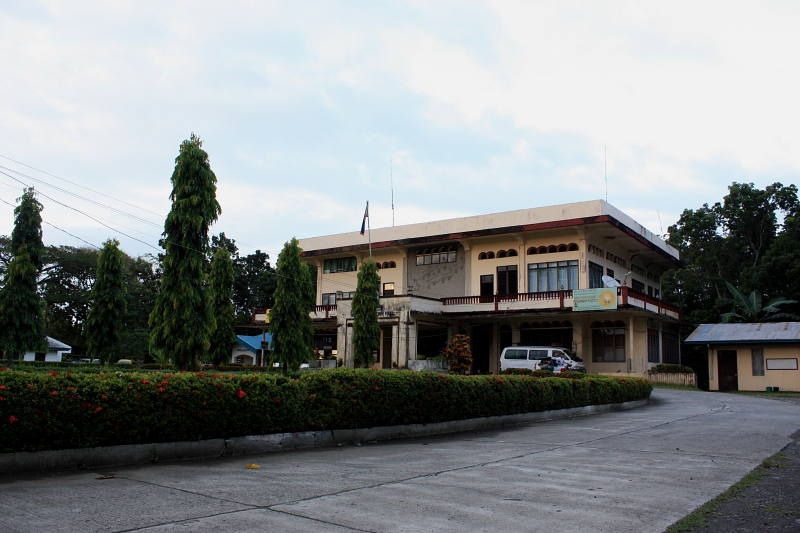
- New Lucena Town Hall

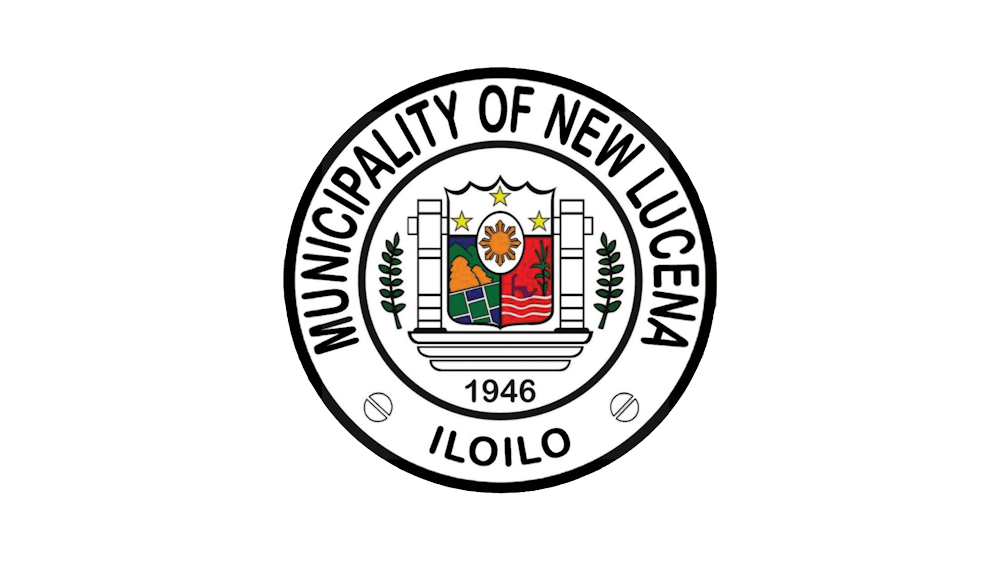
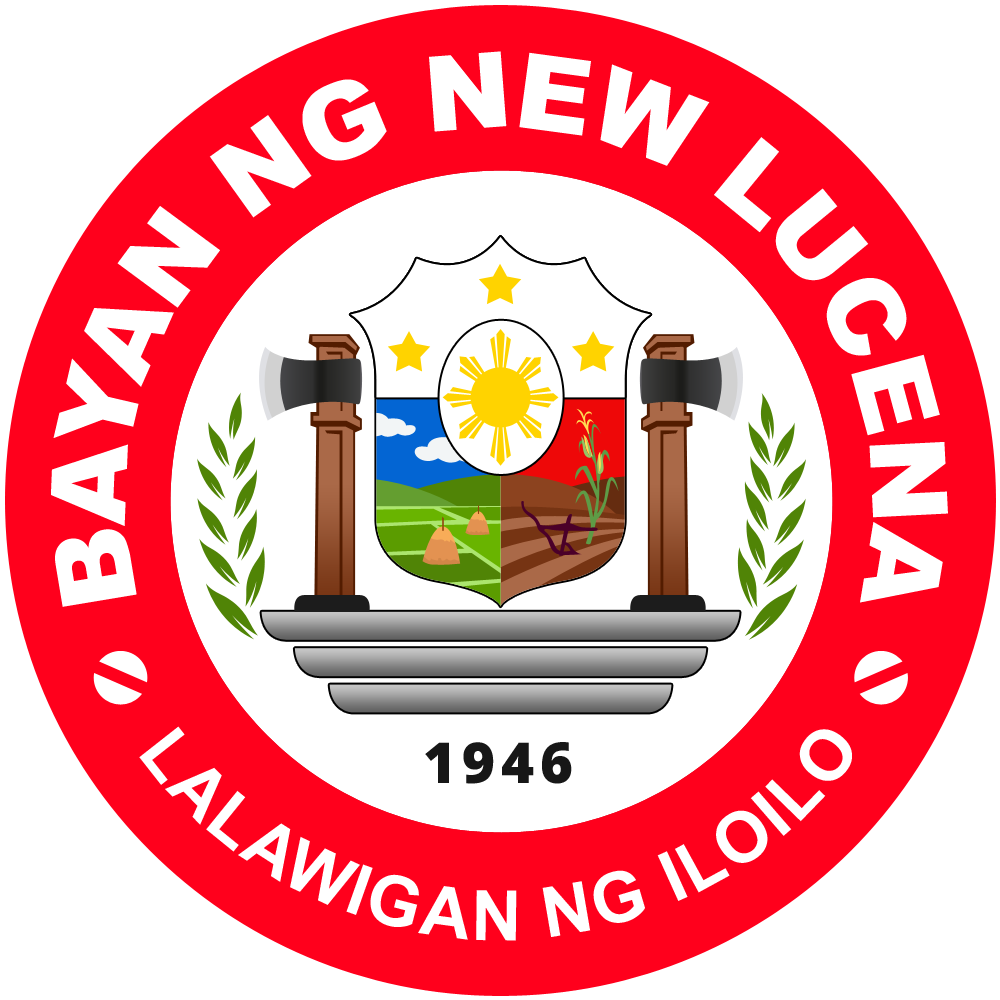
- Flag Seal
- Motto: Child Friendly Municipality in Iloilo
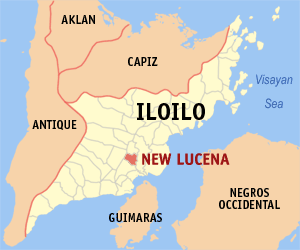
- Map of Iloilo with New Lucena highlighted
- Interactive map of New Lucena
- Location within the Philippines
- Coordinates: 10°53′N 122°36′E
- Country: Philippines
- Region: Western Visayas
- Province: Iloilo
- District: 2nd district
- Founded: October 9, 1877
- Chartered: January 1, 1947
- Barangays: 21 (see Barangays)

Government
  - Type: Sangguniang Bayan
  - Mayor: Carl Vincent G. Mondejar (PFP)
  - Vice Mayor: Isabelo M. Accolador (PFP)
  - Representative: Kathryn Joyce F. Gorriceta (Lakas)
  - Municipal Council: Members: Rene S. Asoy (Lakas); Liecel S. Mondejar-Seville (PFP); Jeffrey V. Araneta (Nacionalista); Ryan T. Sala (PFP); Niño Joseph Vincent D. Sorongon (Lakas); Floyd S. Susario (Lakas); Jocelyn P. Espia (PFP); Mauro R. Laguardia, Jr. (Nacionalista); Valentino Calumay ^{‡}; Buen Gracia Hembra ^{◌}; ‡ ex officio ABC president; ◌ ex officio SK chairman
  - Electorate: 16,299 voters (2025)

Area
  - Total: 44.10 km^{2} (17.03 sq mi)
- Elevation: 23 m (75 ft)
- Highest elevation: 67 m (220 ft)
- Lowest elevation: 4 m (13 ft)

Population (2024 census)
  - Total: 24,785
  - Density: 562.0/km^{2} (1,456/sq mi)
  - Households: 5,812

Economy
  - Income class: 4th municipal income class
  - Poverty incidence: 10.31% (2023)
  - Revenue: ₱ 128.2 million (2024)
  - Assets: ₱ 475.6 million (2024)
  - Expenditure: ₱ 33.75 million (2024)
  - Liabilities: ₱ 156.4 million (2024)

Service provider
  - Electricity: Iloilo 2 Electric Cooperative (ILECO 2)
- Time zone: UTC+8 (PST)
- ZIP code: 5005
- PSGC: 063032000
- IDD : area code: +63 (0)33
- Native languages: Karay-a; Hiligaynon; Ati; Tagalog
- Website: www.newlucena.gov.ph

New Lucena, officially the Municipality of New Lucena (Kinaray-a: Banwa kang New Lucena; Hiligaynon: Banwa sang New Lucena, Tagalog: Bayan ng Bagong Lucena), is a municipality in the province of Iloilo, Philippines. According to the 2024 census, it has a population of 24,785 people.

The "New" in the name was added in 1955.

== History ==
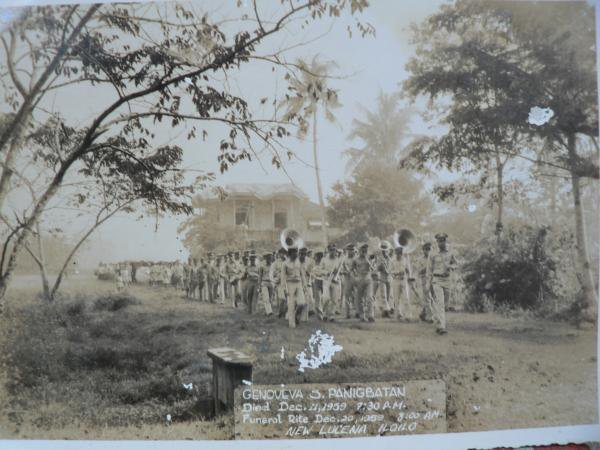
Traditional funeral in New Lucena, circa 1950s

New Lucena was formerly known as Jimanban, a very small barrio organized sometime in 1800, which was a part of the Municipality of Cabatuan. In 1886 the boundary line separating the jurisdiction of Santa Barbara and Cabatuan was defined and Jimanban was made part of Santa Barbara. Intermarriage among the people increased the area's population

Led by Bartolome Valenzuela, a prominent resident of Jimanban, the residents organized themselves and petitioned the governor general that they be granted independence by putting up a church, convent and a casa real (municipal building). With the help of the provincial officials and captain municipal of the municipalities of Santa Barbara, Cabatuan and Pototan, Lucena was separated from Santa Barbara on October 9, 1877, in accordance with the Dirrecion General De Administration Civil. The first Municipal Officials were elected and the first captain municipal was Bartolome Valenzuela known as Tan Abe, the grandfather of then Senator Tomas Confesor and Representative Patricio Confesor.

It is not recorded when Jimanban was changed to New Lucena but Lucena reportedly comes from dialect Lu (Ulo) which means "head" and "cena" which is the short version for the flower azucena, which means pure and peaceful. Thus, Lucena means pure and peaceful leader. Another belief was that Jimanban was changed to Lucena after the name of the Provincial Alcalde Mayor Pedro Gonzales Lucena, the 36th Executive of the Province of Iloilo in 1716–1717.

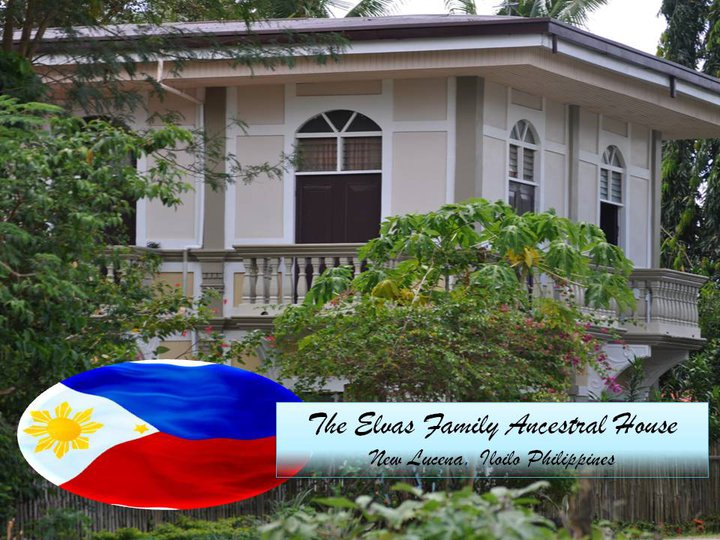
Elvas Ancestral House, built in 1934

When the Americans came, Lucena was again incorporated to Santa Barbara in 1902 for economic security and facilitation of government. In 1921, the prominent citizens of Lucena petitioned for its separation from Santa Barbara. On January 1, 1947, Lucena became a separate town again, and was later renamed New Lucena.

== Geography ==
New Lucena is located in the central portion of the Province of Iloilo. New Lucena has a total land area of 4,410 hectares (10,900 acres), or 0.83% of the total area of Iloilo Province. It is 24 kilometres (15 mi) from Iloilo City.

The town proper of New Lucena could be traversed by land either way via Dawis-Zarraga or via Santa Barbara. New Lucena is crisscrossed by the roads from the north to south and east to west thus providing roads for easy means of transportation.

=== Soil ===
The soil classification map of New Lucena reflects two types of soil, namely the Alimodian Clay Loam and the Santa Rita Clay Loam. The Alimodian Clay Loam is found in barangay Janipa-an Oeste and Badiang, also occupying the larger portion of barangay Jelicuon Oeste, Cabugao, Wari-wari, Cabilauan and Guinobatan; then in the small portion of Barangay Bololacao, Bilidan and Bita-og Gaja

The Santa Rita Clay Loam covers the Barangay Cagban, Burot, General Delgado, Baclayan, Poblacion, Dawis, Balabag, Damires, Calumbuyan, Jelicuon Este and Pasil; also occupying the larger parts of Bita-og gaja, Bilidan and Bololacao; then occupying a smaller portion of Barangay Wari-wari, Cabugao and Guinobatan. Its corresponding type, areas coverage and percentage from the total land area are as follows: The Alimodian Clay Loam covers an area of 1525 hectares is 34.56% of the total land area. The Santa Rita Clay Loam covers an area of 2887 and 65.44% of the total land area.

=== Slope ===
The degree of inclination of the municipality ranges from 0 to 15%. It is best described as broad to level land so moderately undulating and gently rolling land sloping in more than one direction. The slope category A with 0-3% best described as broad to level nearly level, has a total land coverage area of 1475 hectares representing 33.43% of the total land area; 3-5 percent slope or slope category B covers an area of 1762 hectares or 39.94% of the total land area. The 5-8% slope or category C has a total area coverage of 1050 hectares or 23.80% of the total land area. And the 8-15% slope representing the smallest figure of 125 hectares is 2.83% of the total land area.

=== Climate ===
Climate data for New Lucena, Iloilo
Month	Jan	Feb	Mar	Apr	May	Jun	Jul	Aug	Sep	Oct	Nov	Dec	Year
Mean daily maximum °C (°F)	28 (82)	29 (84)	30 (86)	32 (90)	32 (90)	30 (86)	29 (84)	29 (84)	29 (84)	29 (84)	29 (84)	28 (82)	30 (85)
Mean daily minimum °C (°F)	23 (73)	23 (73)	23 (73)	23 (73)	25 (77)	25 (77)	24 (75)	24 (75)	24 (75)	24 (75)	24 (75)	23 (73)	24 (75)
Average precipitation mm (inches)	57 (2.2)	37 (1.5)	41 (1.6)	42 (1.7)	98 (3.9)	155 (6.1)	187 (7.4)	162 (6.4)	179 (7.0)	188 (7.4)	114 (4.5)	78 (3.1)	1,338 (52.8)
Average rainy days	12.0	7.7	9.2	10.2	19.5	24.6	26.9	25.1	25.5	25.2	18.0	13.0	216.9
Source: Meteoblue

New Lucena partly belongs to the first district climate region in the province that is the region dry from December to June and wet from July to November. The average monthly rainfall for 1984 is 263.48 cu.m. and an average humidity of 79.83%

=== Barangays ===
New Lucena is politically subdivided into 21 barangays. Each barangay consists of puroks and some have sitios.

- Baclayan
- Badiang
- Balabag
- Bilidan
- Bita-og Gaja
- Bololacao
- Burot
- Cabilauan
- Cabugao
- Cagban
- Calumbuyan
- Damires
- Dawis
- General Delgado
- Guinobatan
- Janipa-an Oeste
- Jelicuon Este
- Jelicuon Oeste
- Pasil
- Poblacion
- Wari-wari

== Demographics ==
Population census of New Lucena
Year	Pop.	±% p.a.
1903	6,362	—
1948	9,815	+0.97%
1960	9,684	−0.11%
1970	11,074	+1.35%
1975	12,405	+2.30%
1980	13,457	+1.64%
1990	16,910	+2.31%
1995	16,873	−0.04%
2000	19,490	+3.14%
2007	21,318	+1.24%
2010	22,174	+1.44%
2015	23,240	+0.90%
2020	24,314	+0.96%
2024	24,785	+0.46%
Source: Philippine Statistics Authority

In the 2024 census, the population of New Lucena was 24,785 people, with a density of 560 inhabitants per square kilometre or 1,500 inhabitants per square mile.

== Economy ==
Poverty incidence of New Lucena (%)

Source: Philippine Statistics Authority

== See also ==
- List of renamed cities and municipalities of the Philippines
