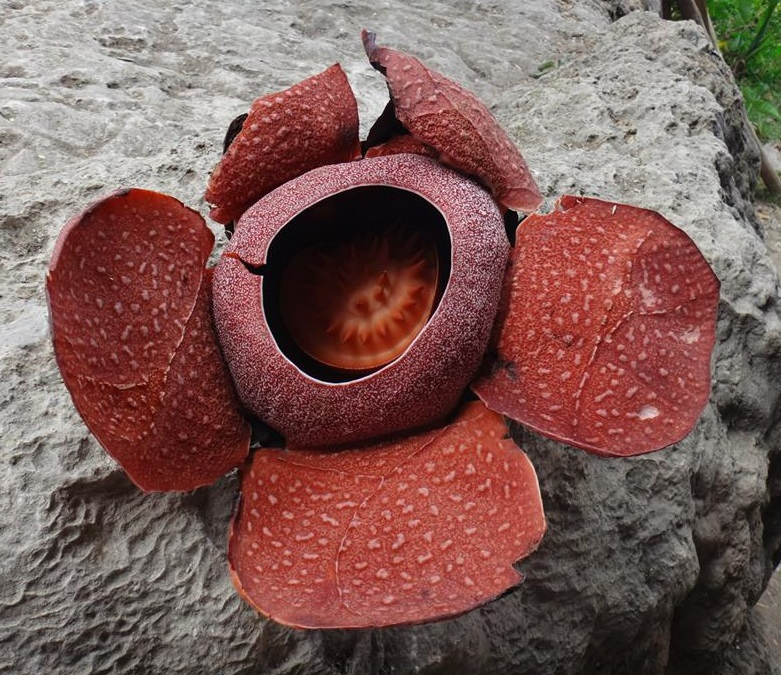
- A bloom of Rafflesia speciosa found in the mountainous barangays of Miagao, Iloilo, on the southern foothills of the Sibalom Natural Park

Scientific classification
- Kingdom: Plantae
- Clade: Embryophytes
- Clade: Tracheophytes
- Clade: Spermatophytes
- Clade: Angiosperms
- Clade: Eudicots
- Clade: Rosids
- Order: Malpighiales
- Family: Rafflesiaceae
- Genus: Rafflesia
- Species: R. speciosa

Binomial name
- Rafflesia speciosa Barcelona & Fernando

= Rafflesia speciosa =

Species of flowering plant

Rafflesia speciosa is a parasitic plant species of the genus Rafflesia. It is endemic to the Philippine island of Panay. R. speciosa is the third Rafflesia species documented to exist in the Philippines, after R. manillana and R. schadenbergiana. It belongs to the medium-sized Rafflesia (Meijer, 1997). The species was named by Julie Barcelona and Edwino Fernando.

Rafflesia speciosa was discovered in the mountains of Sibalom Natural Park (particularly Mount Porras) in Antique, Panay by members of an outdoor club. It was adopted as the symbol of Sibalom Natural Park and the municipality of Sibalom. For more information, see the review of Philippine Rafflesia.
