= University of Antique =

- Onibirsidad kang Antique (Kinaray-a); Pamantasan ng Antique (Filipino)
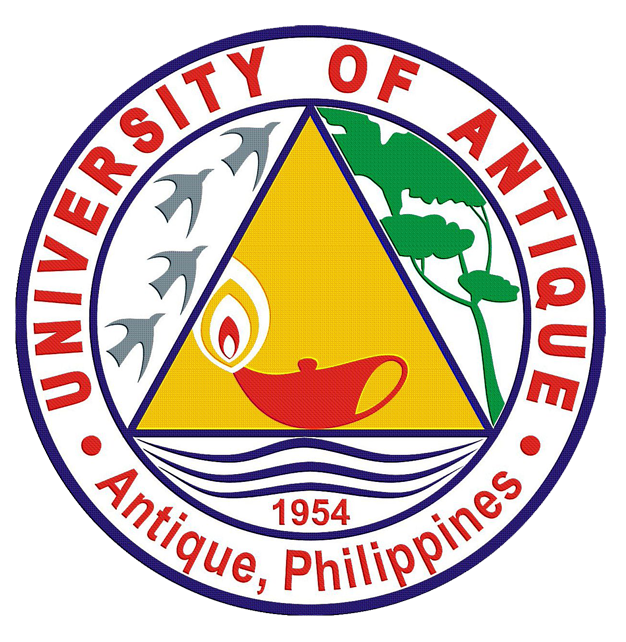
- The university seal
- Former names: Antique School of Arts and Trades (1954-1982); Polytechnic State College of Antique (1982-2009)
- Motto: Transforming lives, Building communities
- Type: State University
- Established: 1954; 72 years ago
- Academic affiliations: AACCUP
- Chairman: Comm. Shirley C. Agrupis
- President: Dr. Godelyn S. Gallega-Hisole
- Vice-president: Dr. Catherine C. Viesca (VP for Academic Affairs); Dr. May T. Delgado (VP for Administration & Finance); Dr. Jelyn O. Alentajan (VP for Research, Extension, Continuing Education & Training Services)
- Students: 21,992 (2021)
- Location: Mayor Santiago A. Lotilla St., Sibalom 5713, Antique, Philippines; 10°47′34″N 122°00′33″E
- Campus: Main: Sibalom, Antique Satellite: Hamtic, Antique Tibiao, Antique Caluya, Antique Libertad, Antique
- Alma Mater song: University of Antique Hymn
- Colors: Red and Gold
- Nickname: KasUbAy
- Mascot: Santi
- Website: antiquespride.edu.ph

- Location in the Visayas Location in the Philippines

The University of Antique (UA), formerly the Polytechnic State College of Antique, is a state university in the Philippines. It is mandated to provide higher technological, professional and vocational instruction and training in science, agricultural and industrial fields, as well as short-term technical or vocational courses. It is also mandated to promote research, advanced studies and progressive leadership in its areas of specialization. Its main campus is in Sibalom, Antique (a suburb of San Jose).

UA was originally the Antique School of Arts & Trades (ASAT) which was established by virtue of Republic Act 857 sponsored by the late Congressman Tobias A. Fornier in 1954 with Mr. Fermin Taruc as its first Superintendent. Mr. Taruc was sent to Sibalom, Antique by the Bureau of Vocational Education to set up and construct the first buildings of ASAT.
