= Maasin, Iloilo =

Municipality in Iloilo, Philippines

Maasin
- Municipality
- Municipality of Maasin
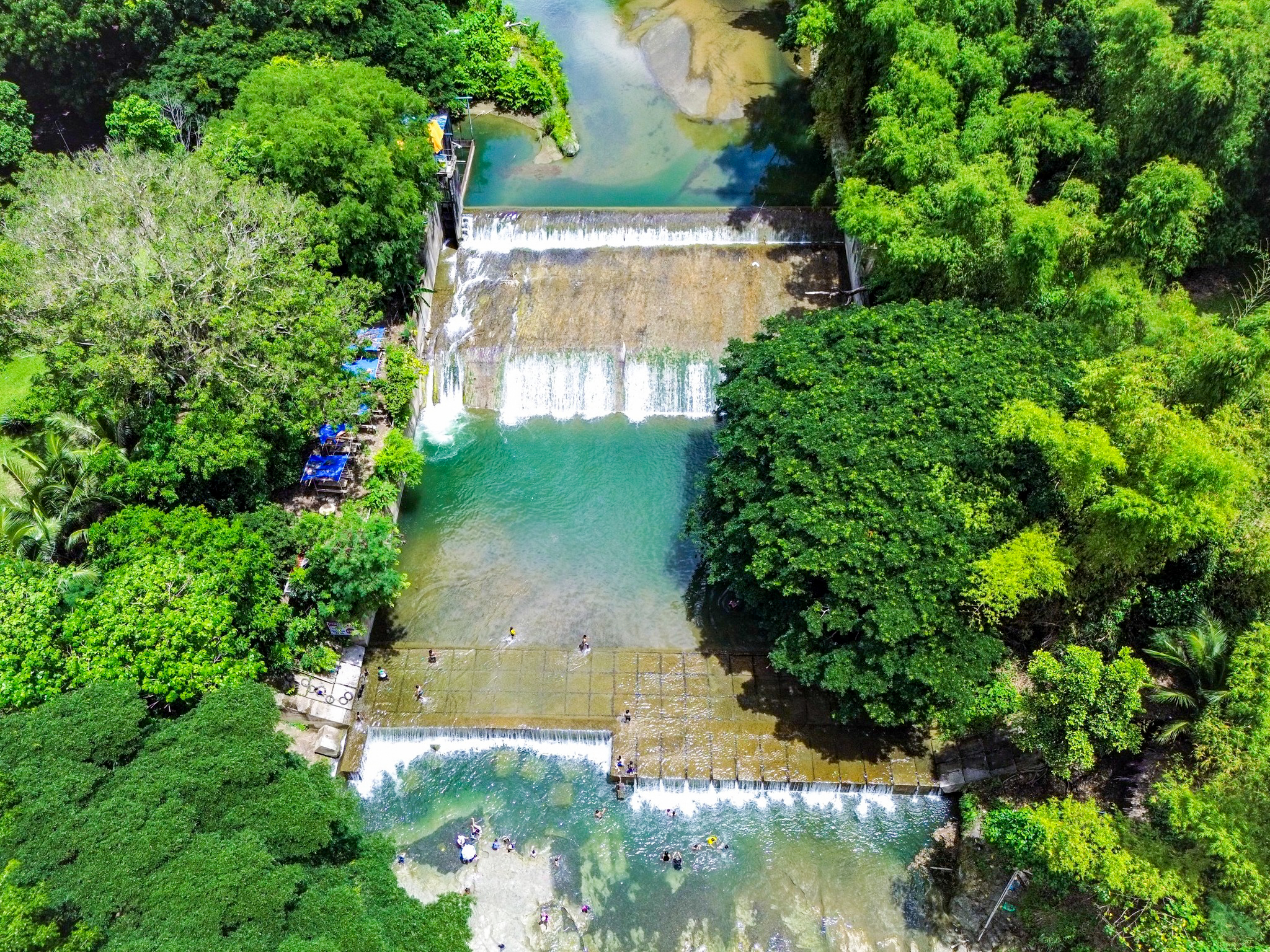
- Maasin Dam

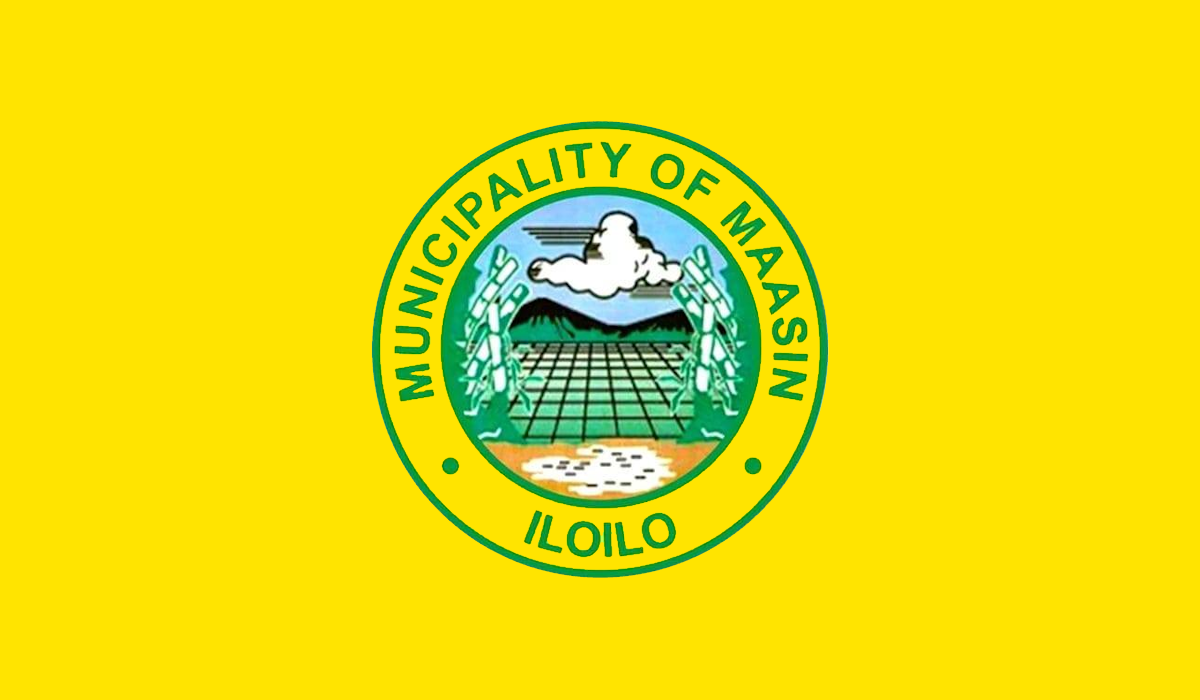
- Flag

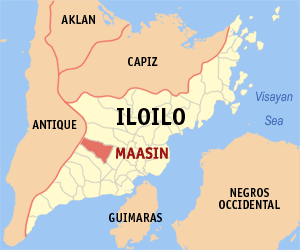
- Map of Iloilo with Maasin highlighted
- Interactive map of Maasin
- Location within the Philippines
- Coordinates: 10°53′N 122°26′E
- Country: Philippines
- Region: Western Visayas
- Province: Iloilo
- District: 3rd district
- Barangays: 50 (see Barangays)

Government
  - Type: Sangguniang Bayan
  - Mayor: Francis A. Amboy (PFP)
  - Vice Mayor: Vicente A. Albacete (PFP)
  - Representative: Lorenz R. Defensor (NUP)
  - Municipal Council: Members: Anthony Francis B. Cartagena (Ind); Ma. Keziah S. Villareal (PFP); Gerard M. Morales (PFP); Jimmy M. Borra (PFP); Mariano D. Malones, Jr. (Ind); Hope P. Mondejar (Ind); Mindaluz M. Billena (PFP); Ariel J. Corcino (Ind); Felipe T. Velasco ^{‡}; Alvin M. Manuel ^{◌}; ‡ ex officio ABC president; ◌ ex officio SK chairman
  - Electorate: 24,963 voters (2025)

Area
  - Total: 128.59 km^{2} (49.65 sq mi)
- Elevation: 130 m (430 ft)
- Highest elevation: 366 m (1,201 ft)
- Lowest elevation: 50 m (160 ft)

Population (2024 census)
  - Total: 38,761
  - Density: 301.43/km^{2} (780.70/sq mi)
  - Households: 8,826

Economy
  - Income class: 2nd municipal income class
  - Poverty incidence: 18.56% (2023)
  - Revenue: ₱ 191.2 million (2024)
  - Assets: ₱ 609.4 million (2024)
  - Expenditure: ₱ 81.5 million (2024)
  - Liabilities: ₱ 172.8 million (2024)

Service provider
  - Electricity: Iloilo 1 Electric Cooperative (ILECO 1)
- Time zone: UTC+8 (PST)
- ZIP code: 5030
- PSGC: 063029000
- IDD : area code: +63 (0)33
- Native languages: Karay-a; Hiligaynon; Tagalog
- Website: www.maasin.gov.ph

Maasin, officially the Municipality of Maasin (Kinaray-a: Banwa kang Maasin; Hiligaynon: Banwa sang Maasin; Tagalog: Bayan ng Maasin), is a municipality in the province of Iloilo, Philippines. According to the 2024 census, it has a population of 38,761 people.

== Geography ==
Maasin is 30 kilometres (19 mi) from Iloilo City.

=== Barangays ===
Maasin is politically subdivided into 50 barangays. Each barangay consists of puroks and some have sitios.

- Abay
- Abilay
- AGROCEL Pob.(Aguinaldo-Roxas-Celso)
- Amerang
- Bagacay East
- Bacuranan
- Bagacay West
- Bug-ot
- Bolo
- Bulay
- Buntalan
- Burak
- Cabangcalan
- Cabatac
- Caigon
- Cananghan
- Canawili
- Dagami
- Daja
- Dalusan
- DELCAR Pob. (Delgado-Cartagena)
- Inabasan
- Layog
- Liñagan Calsada
- Liñagan Tacas
- Linab
- MABRIZ Pob. (Mabini-Rizal)
- Magsaysay
- Mandog
- Miapa
- Nagba
- Nasaka
- Naslo-Bucao
- Nasuli
- Panalian
- Piandaan East
- Piandaan West
- Pispis
- Punong
- Sinubsuban
- Siwalo
- Santa Rita
- Subog
- THT & P Pob. (Taft-Hughes-Thompson-del Pilar)
- Tigbauan
- Trangka
- Tubang
- Tulahong
- Tuy-an East
- Tuy-an West
- Ubian

=== Climate ===
Climate data for Maasin, Iloilo
Month	Jan	Feb	Mar	Apr	May	Jun	Jul	Aug	Sep	Oct	Nov	Dec	Year
Mean daily maximum °C (°F)	29 (84)	30 (86)	32 (90)	33 (91)	31 (88)	30 (86)	29 (84)	29 (84)	29 (84)	29 (84)	29 (84)	29 (84)	30 (86)
Mean daily minimum °C (°F)	22 (72)	22 (72)	22 (72)	23 (73)	25 (77)	25 (77)	24 (75)	24 (75)	24 (75)	24 (75)	23 (73)	22 (72)	23 (74)
Average precipitation mm (inches)	48 (1.9)	41 (1.6)	58 (2.3)	82 (3.2)	223 (8.8)	300 (11.8)	346 (13.6)	307 (12.1)	311 (12.2)	292 (11.5)	167 (6.6)	81 (3.2)	2,256 (88.8)
Average rainy days	11.4	7.7	11.3	15.4	25.7	28.5	29.5	28.7	28.3	28.7	21.8	15.2	252.2
Source: Meteoblue

== Demographics ==
Population census of Maasin
Year	Pop.	±% p.a.
1903	8,401	—
1918	8,317	−0.07%
1939	13,167	+2.21%
1948	16,384	+2.46%
1960	21,510	+2.29%
1970	20,768	−0.35%
1975	24,412	+3.30%
1980	26,962	+2.01%
1990	29,062	+0.75%
1995	29,364	+0.19%
2000	30,828	+1.05%
2007	32,555	+0.75%
2010	35,069	+2.74%
2015	36,922	+0.99%
2020	38,461	+0.86%
2024	38,761	+0.19%
Source: Philippine Statistics Authority

In the 2024 census, the population of Maasin was 38,761 people, with a density of 300 inhabitants per square kilometre or 780 inhabitants per square mile.

== Economy ==
Poverty incidence of Maasin (%)

Source: Philippine Statistics Authority

=== Tourism ===
The contemporary Tultugan Festival was established by Mayor Mariano Malones in 1999. It is rooted from “tultug,” the tapping of the bamboo instrument. Maasin has abundant Bamboo including the “kawayan tinik.” Dedicated to bamboo usage, it is held every last week of December, featuring street dancing, tribal dance, the “Gwapo Karabaw,” “Parada sang Litson,” and “Rara Amakan” contests. The “Kadang Race” is a balance test, with the finale, "Miss Tultugan."

The Tultugan Festival emerged as the champion of the Kasadyahan Festival 2024, earning a PHP500,000 cash prize and PHP10 million worth of projects from Uswag Ilonggo Partylist. Additionally, it secured second place in the Aliwan Fiesta 2024.
