= Badiangan =

Municipality in Iloilo, Philippines

- Municipality
- Municipality of Badiangan
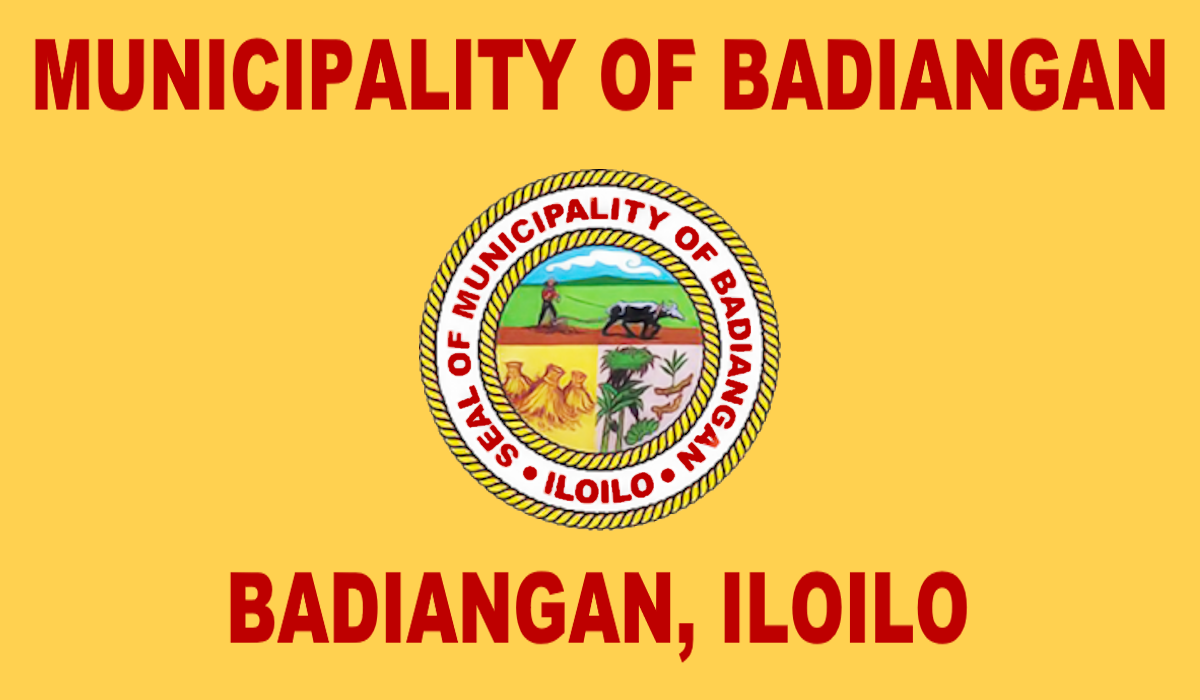
- Flag

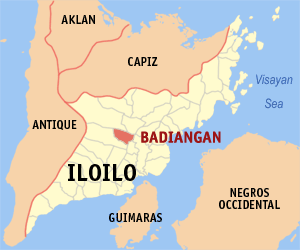
- Map of Iloilo with Badiangan highlighted
- Interactive map of Badiangan
- Location within the Philippines
- Coordinates: 10°59′10″N 122°32′13″E
- Country: Philippines
- Region: Western Visayas
- Province: Iloilo
- District: 3rd district
- Barangays: 31 (see Barangays)

Government
  - Type: Sangguniang Bayan
  - Mayor: Suzette A. Mamon (PFP)
  - Vice Mayor: Cylas Jun P. Nobleza (PFP)
  - Representative: Lorenz R. Defensor (NUP)
  - Municipal Council: Members: Gerardo P. Abogada (Nacionalista); Serafin S. Villa, Jr. (PFP); Gamaliel A. Aborjade (PFP); Jose Elvi V. Leal (PFP); Erwin Roy J. Gaje (PFP); Ian Kim M. Mamon (PFP); Mario J. Hupada (Ind); Kristine C. Larios (Ind); Richard G. Barrato ^{‡}; TJ Nicole V. Vasquez ^{◌}; ‡ ex officio ABC president; ◌ ex officio SK chairman
  - Electorate: 16,649 voters (2025)

Area
  - Total: 77.50 km^{2} (29.92 sq mi)
- Elevation: 69 m (226 ft)
- Highest elevation: 155 m (509 ft)
- Lowest elevation: 35 m (115 ft)

Population (2024 census)
  - Total: 27,088
  - Density: 349.5/km^{2} (905.3/sq mi)
  - Households: 6,607

Economy
  - Income class: 4th municipal income class
  - Poverty incidence: 16.62% (2023)
  - Revenue: ₱ 137.6 million (2024)
  - Assets: ₱ 426.3 million (2024)
  - Expenditure: ₱ 106.8 million (2024)
  - Liabilities: ₱ 70.18 million (2024)

Service provider
  - Electricity: Iloilo 2 Electric Cooperative (ILECO 2)
- Time zone: UTC+8 (PST)
- ZIP code: 5033
- PSGC: 063004000
- IDD : area code: +63 (0)33
- Native languages: Karay-a; Hiligaynon; Tagalog

Badiangan, officially the Municipality of Badiangan (Kinaray-a: Banwa kang Badiangan, Hiligaynon: Banwa sang Badiangan, Tagalog: Bayan ng Badiangan), is a municipality in the province of Iloilo, Philippines. According to the 2024 census, it has a population of 27,088 people.

== Geography ==
Badiangan is 39 kilometres (24 mi) from Iloilo City.

=== Barangays ===
Badiangan is politically subdivided into 31 barangays. Each barangay consists of puroks and some have sitios.

- Agusipan
- Astorga
- Bingauan
- Bita-oyan
- Botong
- Budiawe
- Cabanga-an
- Cabayogan
- Calansanan
- Catubig
- Guinawahan
- Ilongbukid
- Indorohan
- Iniligan
- Latawan
- Linayuan
- Mainguit
- Malublub
- Manaolan
- Mapili Grande
- Mapili Sanjo
- Odiongan
- Poblacion
- San Julian
- Sariri
- Sianon
- Sinuagan
- Talaba
- Tamocol
- Teneclan
- Tina

=== Climate ===
Climate data for Badiangan, Iloilo
Month	Jan	Feb	Mar	Apr	May	Jun	Jul	Aug	Sep	Oct	Nov	Dec	Year
Mean daily maximum °C (°F)	29 (84)	30 (86)	32 (90)	33 (91)	31 (88)	30 (86)	29 (84)	28 (82)	28 (82)	29 (84)	29 (84)	29 (84)	30 (85)
Mean daily minimum °C (°F)	21 (70)	21 (70)	22 (72)	23 (73)	25 (77)	25 (77)	24 (75)	24 (75)	24 (75)	24 (75)	23 (73)	22 (72)	23 (74)
Average precipitation mm (inches)	48 (1.9)	41 (1.6)	58 (2.3)	82 (3.2)	223 (8.8)	300 (11.8)	346 (13.6)	307 (12.1)	311 (12.2)	292 (11.5)	167 (6.6)	81 (3.2)	2,256 (88.8)
Average rainy days	11.4	7.7	11.3	15.4	25.7	28.5	29.5	28.7	28.3	28.7	21.8	15.2	252.2
Source: Meteoblue (Use with caution: this is modeled/calculated data, not measured locally.)

== Demographics ==
Population census of Badiangan
Year	Pop.	±% p.a.
1970	17,230	—
1975	19,502	+2.52%
1980	19,239	−0.27%
1990	21,989	+1.35%
1995	22,795	+0.68%
2000	22,213	−0.55%
2007	24,504	+1.36%
2010	26,218	+2.49%
2015	27,005	+0.56%
2020	27,056	+0.04%
2024	27,088	+0.03%
Source: Philippine Statistics Authority

In the 2024 census, the population of Badiangan was 27,088 people, with a density of 350 inhabitants per square kilometre or 910 inhabitants per square mile.

== Economy ==
Poverty incidence of Badiangan (%)

Source: Philippine Statistics Authority

== Education ==
The Badiangan Schools District Office governs all educational institutions within the municipality. It oversees the management and operations of all private and public, from primary to secondary schools.

Primary and elementary schools

- Astorga Primary School
- Badiangan Central Elementary School
- Badiangan Community Christian School
- Bingauan Elementary School
- Bitaoyan Elementary School
- Botong Elementary School
- Budiaue Elementary School
- Cabayogan - Latauan Elementary School
- Calansanan Elementary School
- Catubig Primary School
- Holy Child Learning Center
- Iniligan Elementary School
- Inta Elementary School
- Mainguit Elementary School
- Malublub - Sinuagan Elementary School
- Manaolan Elementary School
- Mapili Elementary School
- Odiongan Elementary School
- San Julian Elementary School
- Sariri Baptist Kindergarten School
- Tamocol Elementary School
- Tina Elementary School

Secondary schools

- Agusipan Integrated School
- Badiangan National High School
- Tina National High School
