= Binirayan Sports Complex =

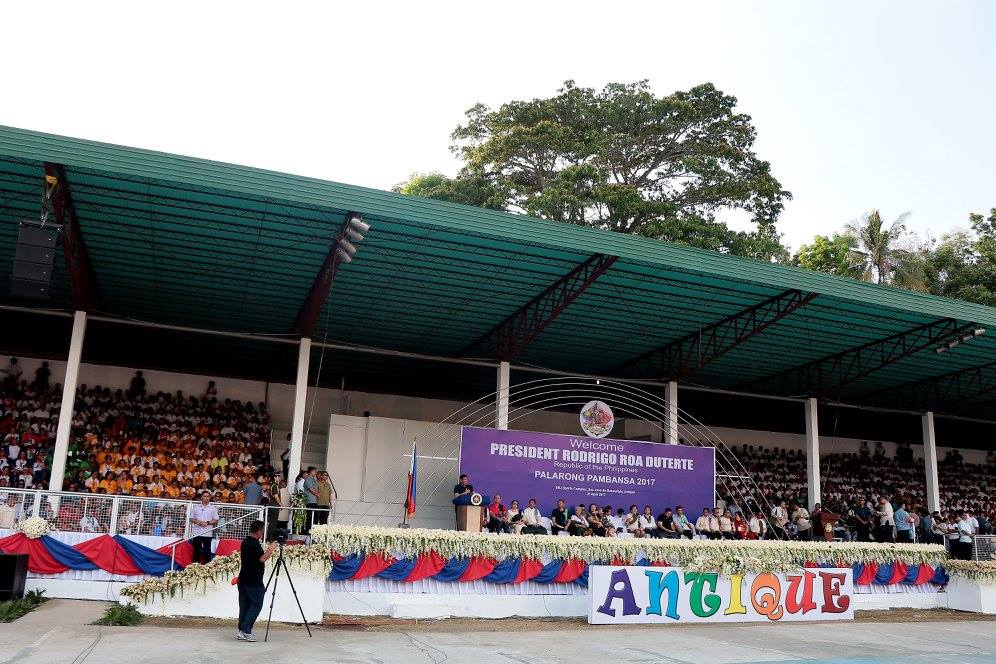
- Their grandstand during the speech of Philippine President Rodrigo Duterte in 2017 Palarong Pambansa
- Interactive map of Binirayan Sports Complex
- Location: San Jose de Buenavista, Antique, Philippines
- Coordinates: 10°44′49″N 121°56′49″E

Construction
- Renovated: 2017

The Binirayan Sports Complex is a sports facility complex located in San Jose de Buenavista, Antique, Philippines.

== Background ==
The sports complex was carved out of La Granja Hill and was one of the projects of the local government under Antique governor, Evelio Javier. The venue has Western Visayas-wide major competitions

In March 2017, the laying of a new rubberized track was commenced with the help of local firm, DMCI. The works was projected to be finished in time for the 2017 Palarong Pambansa. The sports venue hosted the opening ceremony and select events of the national games as planned.
