= Mount Igmatindog =

Mountain in Sibalom, Panay, Philippines

- Location within Visayas Location within Philippines

Highest point
- Elevation: 3,281 ft (1,000 m)
- Listing: Mountains in the Philippines
- Coordinates: 10°45′46″N 122°8′22″E

Geography
- Country: Philippines
- Region: Western Visayas
- Province: Antique
- City/municipality: Sibalom

Mount Igmatindog is a 3,281-foot (1,000 m) mountain peak in the 5,511.47-hectare (13,619.1-acre) Tipulu-an Mau-it Rivers Watershed Forest Reserve, now known as Sibalom Natural Park. Sibalom Natural Park is located in the municipality of Sibalom, Antique, Panay island, which was proclaimed a natural park on 23 April 2000.
