= Sibalom River =

River in Antique, Philippines

- Location within Visayas Location within Philippines

Location
- Country: Philippines
- Region: Western Visayas
- Province: Antique
- City/municipality: Sibalom

Physical characteristics
- Source
  - location: Central Panay Mountain Range, San Remigio, Antique.
  - coordinates: 10°45′46″N 122°8′22″E
  - elevation: 4,000 feet (1,200 m)
- Mouth: Sulu Sea
  - location: coastal border of Belison and San Jose de Buenavista
  - coordinates: 10°48′42″N 121°56′51″E
- Length: 74.5 km (46.3 mi)
- Basin size: 682 km^{2} (263 sq mi)
- Discharge
  - average: 40 m^{3}/s (1,400 cu ft/s)
  - maximum: 900 m^{3}/s (32,000 cu ft/s)

Basin features
- Tributaries
  - left: Maninila River; Tipulu-an River; Mao-it River
  - right: Cansilayan River
- Bridges: Sibalom Bridge

The Sibalom River is the longest river in the province of Antique in Panay island Philippines. With a total length of 74.5 kilometres (46.3 mi) and a drainage basin covering 682 square kilometres (263 sq mi), it is the largest river system in Antique and fourth longest in Panay after the Panay River, Jalaur River, and Aklan River. It is located in Sibalom and San Remigio. Along with its main tributaries the Mao-it River and Tipulu-an River, it forms the 5,511.47-hectare (13,619.1-acre) Tipulu-an and Mao-it River Watershed Forest Reserve (now known as Sibalom Natural Park) which was proclaimed a natural park on April 23, 2000.

The Sibalom River has four main tributaries by length: the Tipulu-an River 33 km, Maninila River 31 km, Mao-it River 15.8 km and Cansilayan River 12.5 km. The river's watershed is considered one of the last remaining lowland rainforests on Panay.

== Tributaries ==
The tributaries of the Sibalom River by length are as follows:

- Tipulu-an River – 33 km (20.5 miles)
- Maninila River – 31 km (19.2 miles)
- Mao-it River – 15.8 km (9.8 miles)
- Cansilayan River – 12.5 km (7.7 miles)
