= Sibalom =

Municipality in Antique, Philippines

- Municipality
- Municipality of Sibalom
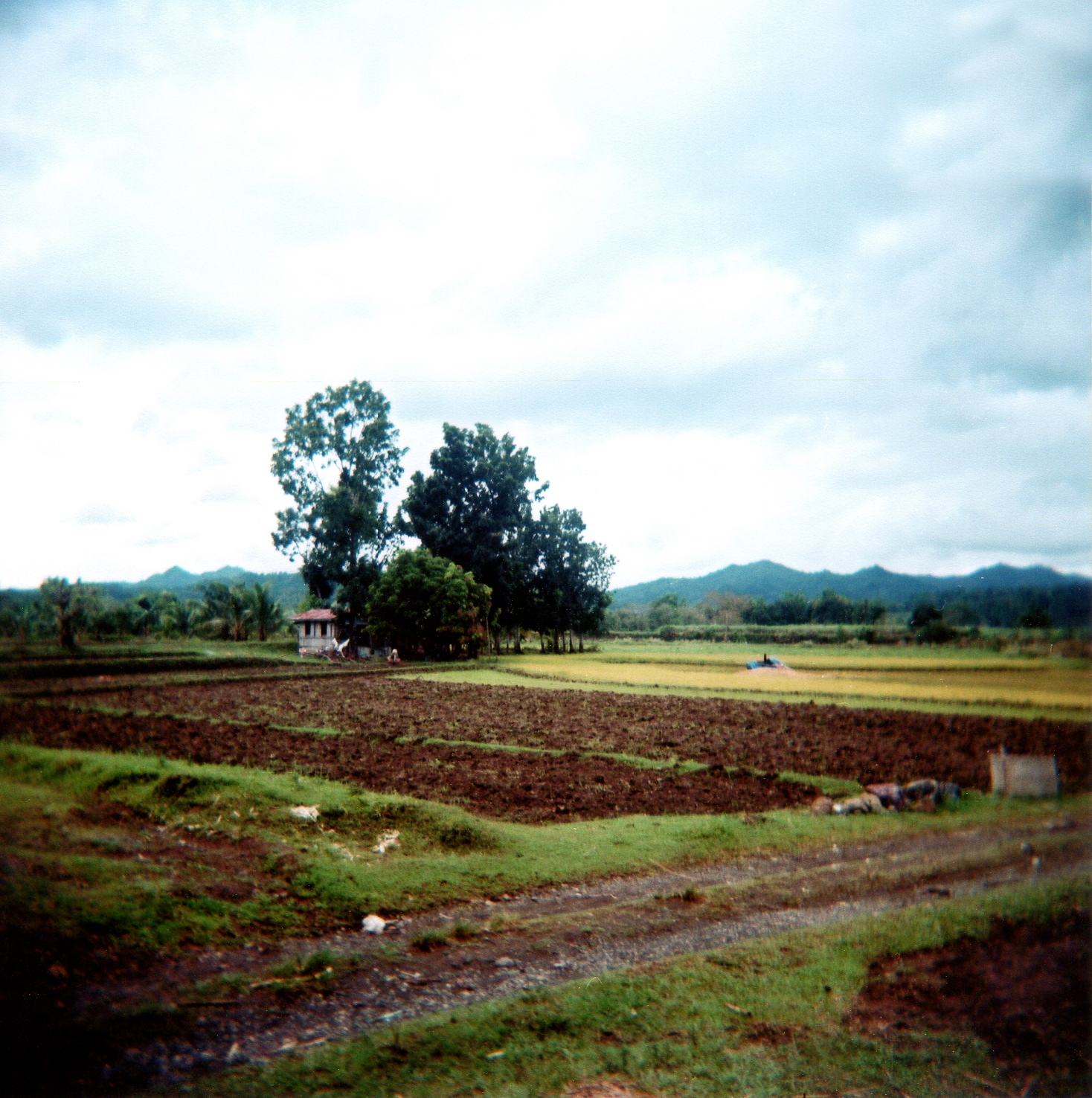
- Sugarcane farm in Sibalom

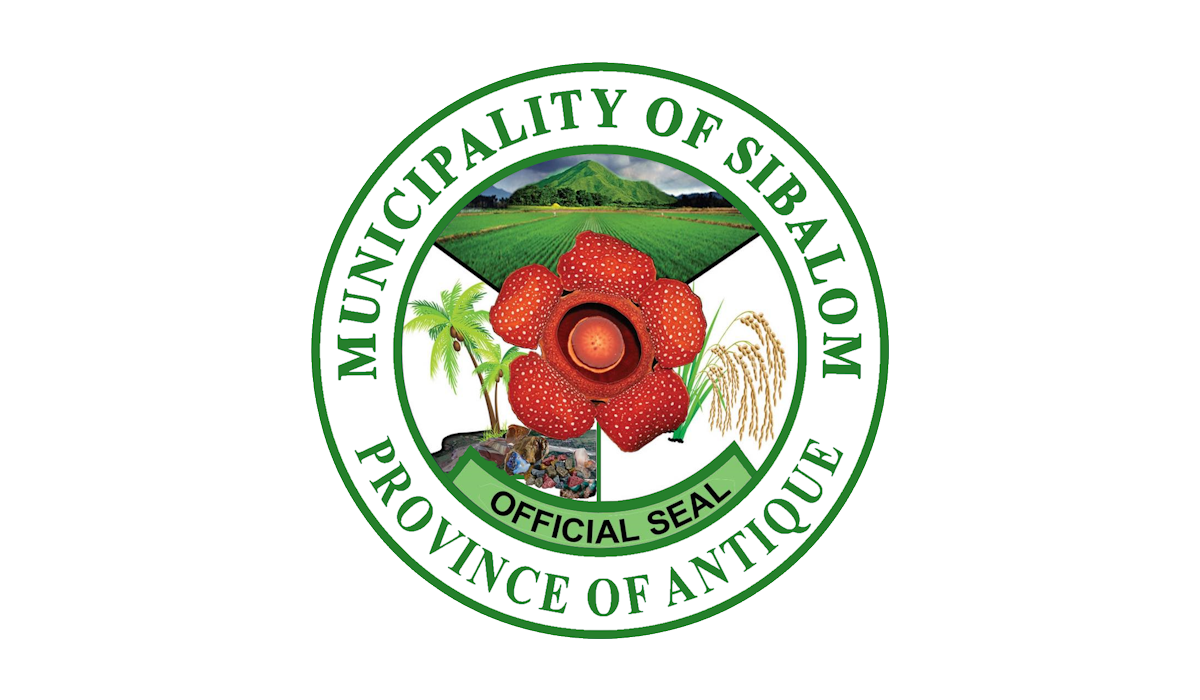
- Flag
- Motto: Experience the Gems of Sibalom
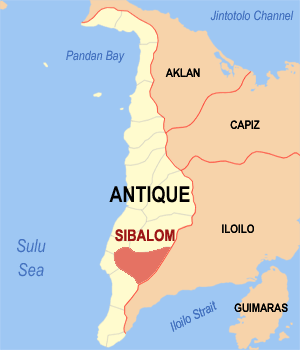
- Map of Antique with Sibalom highlighted
- Interactive map of Sibalom
- Location within the Philippines
- Coordinates: 10°47′18″N 122°01′03″E
- Country: Philippines
- Region: Western Visayas
- Province: Antique
- District: Lone district
- Barangays: 76 (see Barangays)

Government
  - Type: Sangguniang Bayan
  - Mayor: Gian Carlo F. Occeña
  - Vice Mayor: Kazy V. Butiong
  - Representative: Anthony Agapito B. Legarda Jr.
  - Municipal Council: Members: Felipe D. Lacsama Jr.; Jimmy M. Eco; Marc Franco V. Pajarito; Zoilo Bernardo E. Tubianosa; Sebastian V. Butiong; Donna Chris Y. Subong; Reymond D. Nabalan; Marlene S. Nacis
  - Electorate: 41,241 voters (2025)

Area
  - Total: 201.30 km^{2} (77.72 sq mi)
- Elevation: 27 m (89 ft)
- Highest elevation (Mount Sansanan): 1,283 m (4,209 ft)
- Lowest elevation: 10 m (33 ft)

Population (2024 census)
  - Total: 67,155
  - Density: 333.61/km^{2} (864.04/sq mi)
  - Households: 15,111

Economy
  - Income class: 1st municipal income class
  - Poverty incidence: 17.62% (2023)
  - Revenue: ₱ 295.2 million (2024)
  - Assets: ₱ 729.5 million (2024)
  - Expenditure: ₱ 148.6 million (2024)
  - Liabilities: ₱ 308.2 million (2024)

Service provider
  - Electricity: Antique Electric Cooperative (ANTECO)
- Time zone: UTC+8 (PST)
- ZIP code: 5713
- PSGC: 060616000
- IDD : area code: +63 (0)36
- Native languages: Karay-a; Hiligaynon; Ati; Tagalog
- Website: sibalom.gov.ph

Sibalom, officially the Municipality of Sibalom, (Kinaray-a: Banwa kang Sibalom; Hiligaynon: Banwa sang Sibalom; Tagalog: Bayan ng Sibalom), is a municipality in the province of Antique, Philippines. According to the 2024 census, it has a population of 67,155 people. Thus, making it a suburb of San Jose (the provincial capital), the second most populous municipality in the province of Antique and fifth largest municipality in terms of land area, with a total area of 201.30 square kilometers.

== History ==
The 1818 Spanish census recorded 4,665 native families in the area, living in co-existence with 2 Spanish-Filipino families.

== Geography ==
Sibalom is located at 10°47′18″N 122°01′03″E. It is 11 kilometres (6.8 mi) from the provincial capital, San Jose de Buenavista.

According to the Philippine Statistics Authority, the municipality has a land area of 201.30 square kilometres (77.72 sq mi) constituting 7.38% of the 2,729.17-square-kilometre- (1,053.74 sq mi) total area of Antique.

Sibalom's geography is defined by its rolling and mountainous terrain, with about 83% of its land being elevated, making it a landlocked municipality within the coastal province of Antique. Key geographical features include the Sibalom River, the longest in Antique, and the Sibalom Natural Park, a protected area centered around the Tipulu-an and Mao-it river watershed. This mountainous and river-rich environment supports its nickname, the "rice bowl of Antique," due to its significant agricultural activity.

=== Barangays ===
Sibalom is politically subdivided into 76 barangays. Each barangay consists of puroks and some have sitios. From 1953 to 1955, Barangay Catmon was known as Barangay Pajarito.

== Climate ==
Climate data for Sibalom, Antique
Month	Jan	Feb	Mar	Apr	May	Jun	Jul	Aug	Sep	Oct	Nov	Dec	Year
Mean daily maximum °C (°F)	30 (86)	31 (88)	32 (90)	33 (91)	32 (90)	30 (86)	29 (84)	28 (82)	28 (82)	29 (84)	30 (86)	30 (86)	30 (86)
Mean daily minimum °C (°F)	21 (70)	21 (70)	22 (72)	23 (73)	25 (77)	25 (77)	24 (75)	24 (75)	24 (75)	24 (75)	23 (73)	22 (72)	23 (74)
Average precipitation mm (inches)	19 (0.7)	17 (0.7)	26 (1.0)	37 (1.5)	119 (4.7)	191 (7.5)	258 (10.2)	260 (10.2)	248 (9.8)	196 (7.7)	97 (3.8)	39 (1.5)	1,507 (59.3)
Average rainy days	7.2	5.2	8.3	11.9	22.3	26.5	28.3	28.2	27.3	26.4	18.7	11.8	222.1
Source: Meteoblue

== Demographics ==
Population census of Sibalom
Year	Pop.	±% p.a.
1903	15,562	—
1918	17,844	+0.92%
1939	22,178	+1.04%
1948	28,558	+2.85%
1960	24,468	−1.28%
1970	30,392	+2.19%
1975	32,247	+1.20%
1980	35,515	+1.95%
1990	42,647	+1.85%
1995	46,143	+1.49%
2000	49,971	+1.72%
2007	53,934	+1.06%
2010	56,058	+1.42%
2015	60,306	+1.40%
2020	63,833	+1.20%
2024	67,155	+1.23%
Source: Philippine Statistics Authority

In the 2024 census, Sibalom had a population of 67,155 people. The population density was 330 inhabitants per square kilometre (850/sq mi).

== Economy ==
Poverty incidence of Sibalom (%)

Source: Philippine Statistics Authority

== Tourism ==
Sibalom's tourism industry dawned after the proclamation of the Sibalom Natural Park.

=== Sibalom Natural Park ===
Sibalom Natural Park, one of the last patches of lowland forest on Panay Island and the first protected area in the island, harbors many unique species of plants and animals, some of which are on the brink of extinction. About 5,000 hectares (12,000 acres) of forest in Sibalom from Mount Porras extending to Mount Igmatindog, covering Sibalom river and its main tributaries Mao-it river and Tipulu-an river, was declared a natural park on April 23, 2000. Of this forest, 672 hectares (1,660 acres) are undisturbed by any human activity while about 4,223 hectares (10,440 acres) constitutes the 50-year-old reforestation site. One highlight is the Rafflesia speciosa, discovered in Mount Porras and surrounding Barangays in 2002. Dubbed the biggest bloom in the world, its discovery put Sibalom in the map of tourist stopovers in the Philippines. Sibalom also has century-old industries and structures, as well as boulders of gemstones and treacherous mountain trails.

== Education ==
There are two schools district offices which govern all educational institutions within the municipality. They oversee the management and operations of all private and public, from primary to secondary schools. These are the:

- Sibalom North Schools District
- Sibalom South Schools District

=== Primary and elementary schools ===
- Adventist Elementary School
- Alangan-Bungsod Cubay Elementary School
- Apong Elementary School
- Bari Elementary School
- Barley Learning Center
- Berean Sibalom Christian Academy
- Bongbongan I Elementary School
- Bongbongan II Elementary School
- Bontol Elementary School
- Buga Elementary School
- Bululacao Elementary School
- Cabariuan Elementary School
- Cabladan-Cabanbanan Elementary School
- Cadoldolan-Igdagmay Elementary School
- Calooy Elementary School
- Catmon Elementary School
- Catungan 3rd & 4th Elementary School
- Egaña Elementary School
- Egaña Sacred Heart Parochial School
- Esperanza Elementary School
- Fornier Elementary School
- Happy Kids Character Building and Learning Center
- Igcocok Elementary School
- Iglanot Elementary School
- Igpanolong Elementary School
- Igsuming Elementary School
- Ilabas Elementary School
- Imparayan Elementary School
- Inabasan Elementary School
- Indag-an Elementary School
- Initan Elementary School
- Insarayan Elementary School
- Juan Vego Elementary School
- Lagdo Elementary School
- Lambayagan Elementary School
- Lotilla Elementary School
- LSD Child Study Center
- Luyang Elementary School
- Maasin Elementary School
- Mabini Elementary School
- Nagdayao Elementary School
- Nazareth Elementary School
- Odiong Elementary School
- Pangpang Elementary School
- Panlagangan Elementary School
- Pis-anan Central School
- Salvacion Elementary School
- Sibalom Central Elementary School
- Sido-San Juan Elementary School
- Sta. Rita Academy
- Tabong-Tabong Elementary School
- Tig-ohot Elementary School
- Tigbalua Elementary School
- Tinubuan Primary School
- Tordesillas Elementary School
- Tulatula Elementary School
- V. Grasparil Elementary School
- Villafont Elementary School
- Villar Elementary School
- Valentine Saydoquis Memorial School

=== Secondary schools ===
- Dr. Luis E. Baraquia National High School
- Egaña National High School
- Lacaron lntegrated School
- LSD Child Study Center
- Pangpang National High School
- Pis-anan National High Sshool
- Sibalom National High School
- Sido-San Juan National High School
- University of Antique (High School)
- Wright Technological College (High School)

=== Higher educational institutions ===
- University of Antique (Main Campus)
- Wright Technological College
