= Karay-a language =

Visayan language

Karay-a
- Harayan
- Kinaray-a, Hiniraya, Binisaya nga Karay-a
- Native to: Philippines
- Region: Antique, southern and central Iloilo, southern part of Guimaras, southern Aklan, Occidental Mindoro particularly in Ilin Island, western Capiz, some parts of Palawan, and a few parts of Soccsksargen
- Ethnicity: Karay-a
- Native speakers: 1.1 million (2023)
- Language family: Austronesian: Malayo-Polynesian; Philippine; Central Philippine; Bisayan; Western Bisayan; Karay-a
- Writing system: Latin

Official status
- Official language in: Regional language in the Philippines
- Regulated by: Komisyon sa Wikang Filipino

Language codes
- ISO 639-3: krj
- Glottolog: kina1250
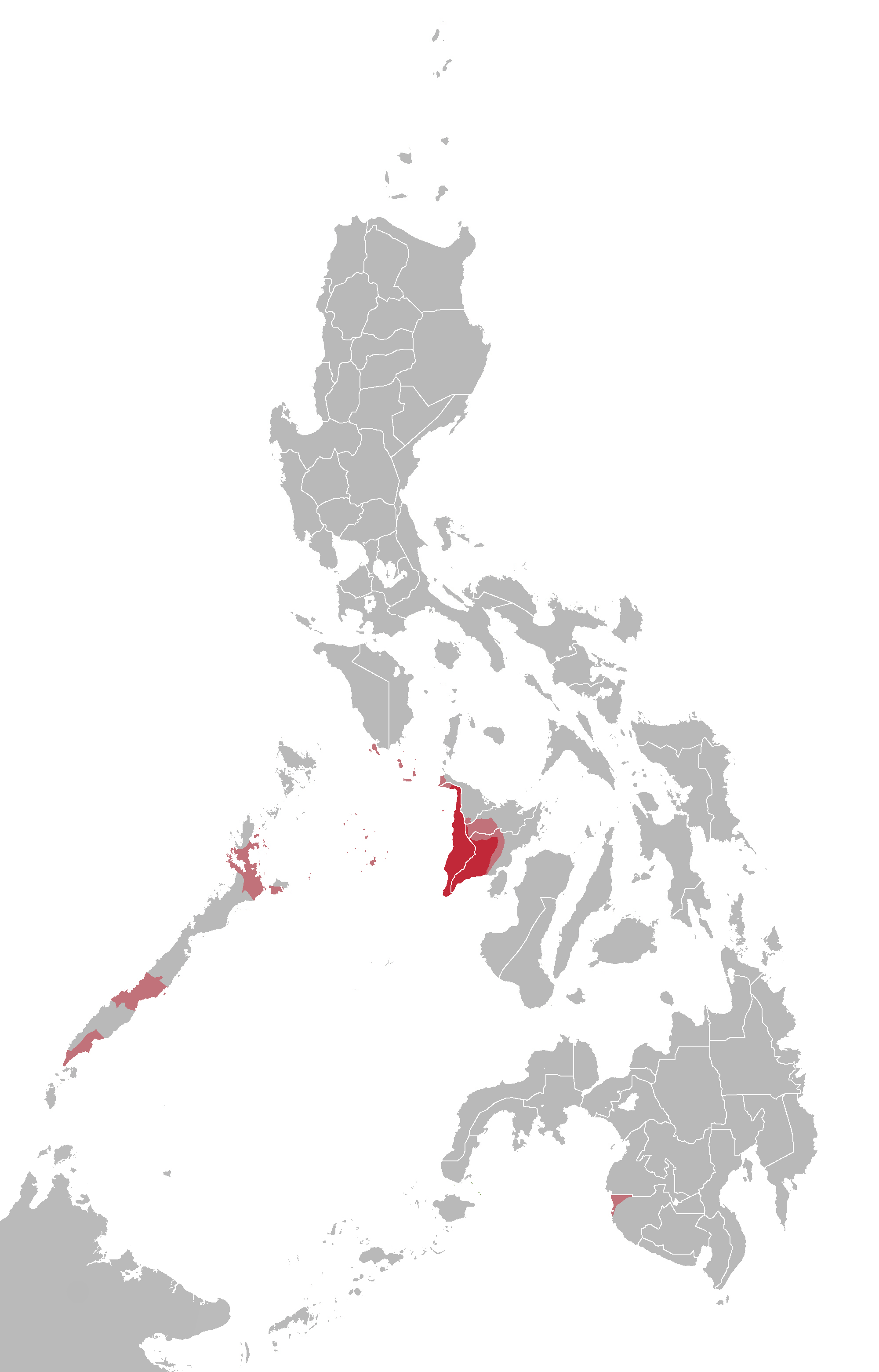
- Area where Karay-a is spoken

The Karay-a language (Kinaray-a, Binisayâ nga Kinaray-a or Hinaraya; English: Harayan) is an Austronesian regional language in the Philippines spoken by the Karay-a people, mainly in Antique.

It is one of the Bisayan languages, along with Aklanon/Malaynon, Capiznon, Cebuano, and Hiligaynon.

== History ==
Kinaray-a, Kinaray-a Bukidnon, or Hiniraya, possibly deriving from "Iraya." It was the primary language spoken by the majority of the Panay people whom the first Spanish colonizers encountered upon their arrival and subsequent settlement in Ogtong (now Oton, Iloilo) between the late 16th and early 17th centuries. This was before the linguistic evolution that eventually led to the Hiligaynon language of Iloilo gaining dominance as the common language over Kinaray-a on the island. However, in modern times, Kinaray-a remains in use as a primary language in the province of Antique and the western part of Iloilo province.

== Geographical distribution ==
Kinaray-a is spoken mainly in Antique. It is also spoken in Iloilo province as a primary language in the city of Passi, in the municipalities of Alimodian, San Joaquin, Lambunao, Calinog, Leon, Miag-ao, Pavia, Badiangan, San Miguel, Guimbal, San Enrique, Tigbauan, Igbaras, Leganes, Pototan, Bingawan, San Rafael, Mina, Zarraga, Oton, Santa Barbara, Cabatuan, Janiuay, Maasin, New Lucena, Dueñas, Dingle, and Tubungan, and certain villages in Palawan and Mindanao – especially in the Soccsksargen region (particularly the province of Sultan Kudarat) by citizens who trace their roots to Antique or to Karay-a-speaking areas of Panay island. Inhabitants of most towns across the latter areas speak Kinaray-a while Hiligaynon is predominant around coastal areas particularly in Iloilo. It is also spoken in Iloilo City by a minority, particularly in the Arevalo district and few parts of southern Mindoro and parts Capiz and Aklan provinces, as well as Guimaras and some parts of Negros Occidental.

=== Dialects ===
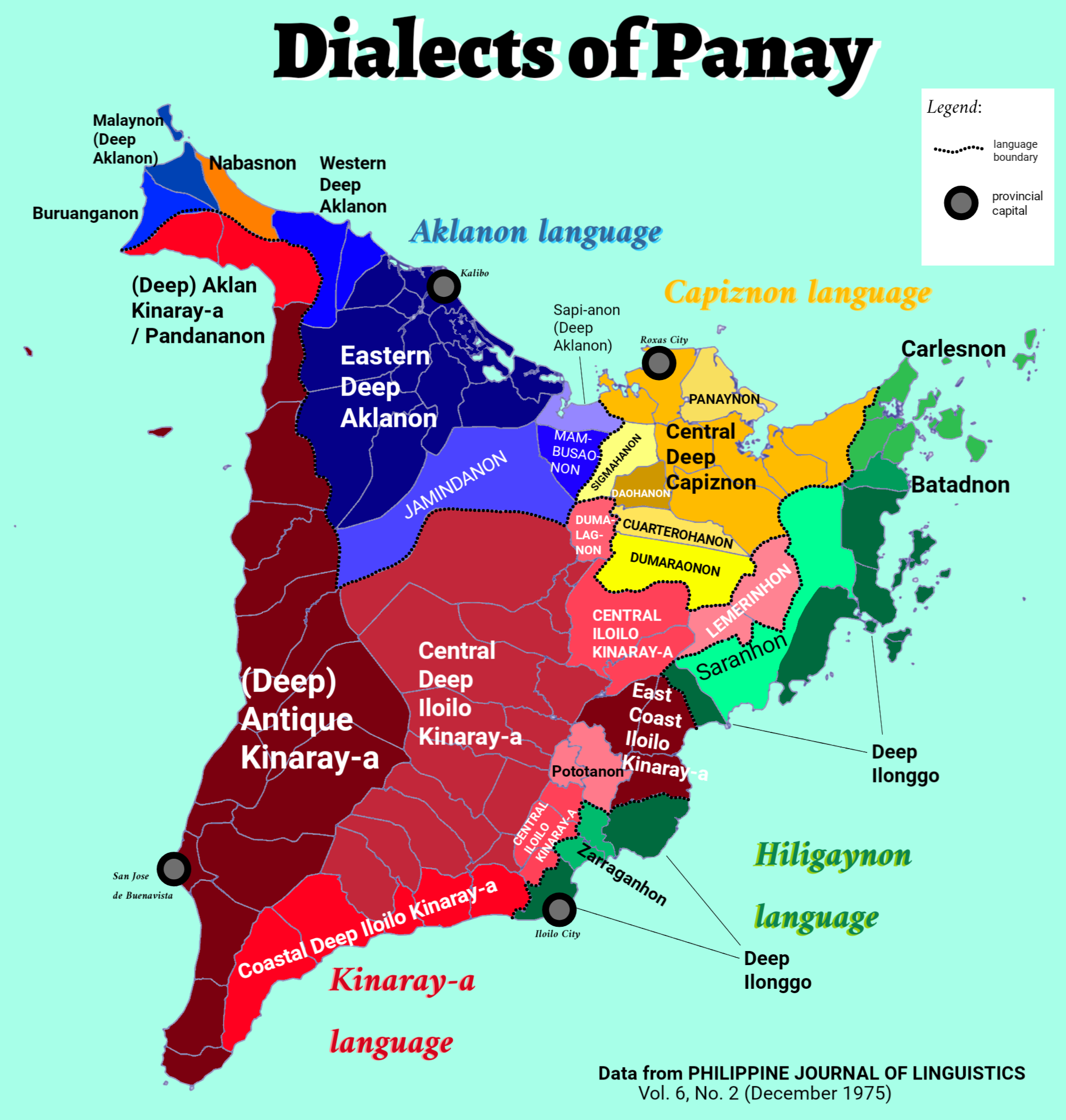
Map of the Dialects of Panay Languages including Kinaray-a

There has not been much linguistic study on the dialects of Kinaray-a. Speakers both of Kinaray-a and Hiligaynon would however admit to hearing the differences in the ways by which Kinaray-a speakers from different towns speak. Differences in vocabulary can also observed between and among the dialects.

The differences and the degrees by which the dialects differ from each other depend largely on the area's proximity to another different language-speaking area. Thus, in Antique, there are, on the northern parts, varieties that are similar to Aklanon, the language of Aklan, its neighbor on the north. On the south, in Iloilo towns on the other hand, the dialects closely resemble that of the standard Kinaray-a spoken in San Jose de Buenavista, lowland Sibalom and Hamtic. A distinct dialect of Karay-a is spoken in central Iloilo where a lot of Hiligaynon loanwords are used and some Kinaray-a words are pronounced harder as in rigya or ja ('here') of southern Iloilo and San José de Buenavista area as compared to giya of Janiuay, Santa Barbara, and nearby towns. Two highly accented dialects of Kinaray-a can be heard in Anini-y and Tobias Fornier in Antique and San Joaquin, Leon, and Tubungan in Iloilo.

Some dialects differ only on consonant preference like y vs h. e.g. bayi/bahi ('girl') or l vs r e.g. wala/wara. Some have distinct differences like sayëd/kadë ('ugly') and rangga/gëba ('defective').

=== Intelligibility with Hiligaynon ===
Due to geographic proximity and mass media Kinaray-a-speakers can understand Hiligaynon (also known as Ilonggo) speakers. However, only Hiligaynon speakers who reside in Kinaray-a-speaking areas can understand the language. Those who come from other areas, like Iloilo City and Negros Island, have difficulty in understanding the language, if they can at all.

It is a misconception among some Hiligaynon speakers that Kinaray-a is a dialect of Hiligaynon; the reality is that the two belong to two different, but related, branches of the Bisayan languages.

However, most Karay-a also know Hiligaynon as their second language. To some extent, an intermediate dialect of Hiligaynon and Kinaray-a is spoken in Mindanao, mainly in Sultan Kudarat province.

== Phonology ==
=== Vowels ===
	Front	Central	Back
Close	i	ə ~ ɨ	u
Mid	e ~ ɛ	ə ~ ɨ	o
Open		a	

The phonemes /e/ and /o/ are used mostly in non-Karay-a words and were formerly allophonic with /i/ and /u/, respectively. The phonemes /i/ and /u/ may also be pronounced as [ɪ] and [ʊ]. Among some speakers, /u/ may be pronounced as [ə], such as when subâ is uttered as [səˈbaʔ] instead of as /suˈbaʔ/.

Vowel comparison of Karay-a, Hiligaynon and Tagalog cognates
English	Karay-a	Hiligaynon	Tagalog
mine	akën	akon	akin
dark	madëlëm	madulom	madilim
food	pagkaën	pagkaon	pagkain
head	ulo	ulo	ulo
ball	bola	bola	bola
animal	sapat, hayëp	sapat	hayop
plant	tanëm	tanom	pananim, halaman
six	anëm	anom	anim

=== Consonants ===
Kinaray-a Consonants
		Labial	Alveolar	Palatal	Velar	Glottal
Nasal		m	n		ŋ	
Plosive	voiceless	p	t		k	ʔ
Plosive	voiced	b	d		ɡ	
Fricative			s			h
Tap/Flap			ɾ			
Approximant			l	j	w	

== Orthography ==
There are two official orthographic conventions currently in use: a four-vowel-grapheme system released by the Komisyon sa Polong Kinaray·a in 2016 in coordination with the Komisyon sa Wikang Filipino (KWF), and a six-vowel-grapheme system recommended by the KWF in 2018. The latter builds on Brigadier General Vicente Pangantihon's introduction of a separate letter ⟨ə⟩ for /ɨ/ through the publication of Karay-a Rice Tradition Revisited, but using ⟨ë⟩ in ⟨ə⟩'s place. Karay-a writings predating Pangantihon's innovation had not graphemically distinguished between /ɨ/ and /u/. In 2018, the KWF elaborated,

Harmonization is not compulsory for older users of the language or individual organizations; it is specifically aimed at helping the Department of Education and teachers to teach any of the native languages. Other organizations are free to adopt their own stylebook in their own publications.

=== Vowels ===
The 2018 Pangantihon–KWF orthography provides for six vowel letters: ⟨a⟩, ⟨e⟩, ⟨ë⟩ (previously ⟨ə⟩), ⟨i⟩, ⟨o⟩ and ⟨u⟩. (Note: The vowel "u" is called matig-a nga "o" (the hard "o"). Hence, when a syllable with a vowel is pronounced lightly, the vowel "i" is substituted with the vowel "e". The opposite rule applies to the vowel "u". The practice however, is not the norm. What is more controlling for using either the vowels "i" and "o" or the introduced vowels "e" and "u" is what appears to the Karay-as pleasing to their eyes and ears. When in doubt on what vowel to use, it is always safe to use the indigenous vowels. The introduced "ë" vowel has no substitute. It will always be used since many Kinaray-a words have a schwa vowel sound.) They do not form diphthongs with each other and always indicate a separate syllable: there are as many vowels as there are syllables. Informal writing, however, contravenes this orthographic rule such as, for example, when words such as balunggay, kambiyo, lanaw, puwede, ruweda and tuáw are written as *balunggai, *kambio, *lanao, *puede, *rueda and *tuao.

⟨Ë⟩, referred to as malëm·ëk nga ⟨i⟩ and which Pangantihon had originally written as ⟨ə⟩, represents /ɨ/, a phoneme that occurs natively in Karay-a and in some other languages spoken in the Philippines such as Ivadoy, Maranao and Pangasinan. ⟨Ë⟩ is also used for integrated words of relatively recent foreign origin.

Separate glyphs for /e/ and /u/ were introduced with the arrival of the Spaniards; namely ⟨e⟩ and ⟨u⟩.

=== Consonants ===
In line with the KWF's 2018 recommendation, the alphabet has 23 consonant letters: ⟨b⟩, ⟨c⟩, ⟨d⟩, ⟨f⟩, ⟨g⟩, ⟨h⟩, ⟨j⟩, ⟨k⟩, ⟨l⟩, ⟨m⟩, ⟨n⟩, ⟨ñ⟩, ⟨ng⟩, ⟨p⟩, ⟨q⟩, ⟨r⟩, ⟨s⟩, ⟨t⟩, ⟨v⟩, ⟨w⟩, ⟨x⟩, ⟨y⟩ and ⟨z⟩. Of the above, ⟨c⟩, ⟨ñ⟩, ⟨q⟩ and ⟨x⟩ are used only in names and unintegrated loan words.

The digraph ⟨ng⟩ constitutes a single letter and represents the phoneme /ŋ/. In the old orthography, which followed the Spanish norms set forth by the Real Academia Española, this phoneme was represented by ⟨n͠g⟩, the tilde stretching over both letters in order to distinguish it from ⟨ng⟩ and ⟨ñ⟩, which represented the Spanish /ŋɡ/ and /ɲ/, respectively.

In contrast to ⟨ng⟩, the digraph ⟨ts⟩, which represents /t͡ʃ/, is not counted as a distinct letter.

== Grammar ==
=== Nouns ===
Noun cognacy between Kinaray-a, Malay and Tagalog
Karay-a	English meaning	Malay	English meaning	Tagalog	English meaning
ayam	dog	ayam/anjing	chicken/dog	manok/aso	chicken/dog
bayi, bahi	female, woman	wanita	female, woman	babae	female, woman
bosong	abdomen	pusar/pusat	navel/central	puson/pusod	stomach/navel, core
kutî	cat	kucing	cat	kuting	kitten
damog	fodder	umpan/(pa)dang	fodder/pasture	kumpay/damo	fodder/pasture, grass
yawâ	demon	setan/awa	demon/accusation	demonyo/awa	demon/pity
makəl/uhong	mushroom	jamur	mushroom	kabuti	mushroom
kahig	foot	kaki	foot	paa	to scrape (ground)

=== Pronouns ===
	Absolutive₁ (emphatic)	Absolutive₂ (non-emphatic)	Ergative₁ (postposed)	Ergative₂ (preposed)	Oblique
1st person singular	ako	takən	nakən, ko	akən	kanakən
2nd person singular	ikaw, kaw	timo	nimo, mo	imo	kanimo
3rd person singular	-	tana	nana, na	ana	kanana, kana
1st person plural inclusive	kita	tatən	natən, ta	atən	kanatən
1st person plural exclusive	kami	tamən	namən	amən	kanamən
2nd person plural	kamo	tinyo	ninyo, nyo	inyo	kaninyo
3rd person plural	sanda	tanda	nanda	anda	kananda

== Numbers ==
Number	Kinaray-a	Malay	Tagalog
1	isará/sará	satu	isa
2	darwa	dua	dalawa
3	tatlo	tiga	tatlo
4	apat	empat	apat
5	limá	lima	lima
6	anəm	enam	anim
7	pitó	tujuh	pito
8	waló	lapan	walo
9	siyam	sembilan	siyam
10	pulù	(se)puluh	sampu
11	napulù kag sará / unsi (from Spanish)	(se)belas	labing-isa/onse (from Spanish)
50	kalim-an/singkwenta (from Spanish)	lima puluh	limampu/singkwenta (from Spanish)
100	sangkagatos/sanggatos	se ratus	isang daan
1,000	sangkalibo/sanglibo	se ribu	isang libo
100,000	sangka gatos ka libo	se ratus ribu	isang daang libo
500,000	lima ka gatos ka libo	lima ratus ribu	lima daang libo
1,000,000	sangka milyon	satu juta	isang milyon

== Common expressions ==
Saying Diin kaw maagto? (literally 'Where are you going?') is a common way to greet people. The question does not need to be answered directly. The usual answer is an action like Maninda (literally 'to buy something on the market') instead of Sa tinda (literally, 'to the market'.)

- Are you eating well? – Mayad man pangaën mo?
- Good. – Mayad.
- How are you feeling? – Musta bay pamatyagan mo? or: Ano bay pamatyag mo? (What do you feel?)
- I don't know. – Wara takën kamaan. / Waay takën kamaan (or simply: Maan a. / Ambay a. / Ilam a. – informal, usually an annoyed expression)
- Let's go! – Panaw ta / Halin ta ron! / Dali ron! (usually for hurrying up companions)
- Come together. – Iririmaw kita. / imaw kita. / Iribhanay kita./ Iririmaw tatən
- Why? – Manhaw/Wanhaw? (or: Andët haw/aw?)/ Insa haw? / Insaw? (informal)
- I love you. – Ginagugma ta (i)kaw. / palangga ta (i)kaw.
- My love/sweetheart. – Palangga ko.
- What is your name? – Ano ngaran mo?
- Good morning! – Mayad nga aga!
- Good afternoon! – Mayad nga hapon!
- Good evening! – Mayad nga gabiʔi!
- That one. – Amo kara. (Or simply: Ra/Ra ay.)(or: Amo ran)/ Amo ka di-a.
- How much? – Tag pira?
- Yes. – hə-əd. (Ho-ud)/ (h)ə-əd
- No. – Bukut./Bëkët. (Bëkën)/Indi
- Because. – Bangëd.
- Because of you. – Bangëd kanimo or Tëngëd kanimo.
- About you. – Nahanungëd kanimo or Parti kanimo.
- You know. – Man-an mo (or: Man-an mo man.)
- Hurry! – Dasiga! (lit. 'Fast!') or Dali-a! (lit. 'Hurry!')
- Again. – Liwan/Liwat/Riwan/Liwan (or: Uman ('again') / Umana (command to repeat).)
- Do you speak English? – Kamaan kaw maghambal kang Inglis? or Kama-an kaw mag-Inglis?
- It is fun to live. – Sadya mabuhi / Sadya ang mabuhi.
- Happy – Sadya
- Thank you – Salamat

== See also ==
- Language shift
- Hiligaynon
- Language revitalization
