= Tomás Confesor =

Filipino politician

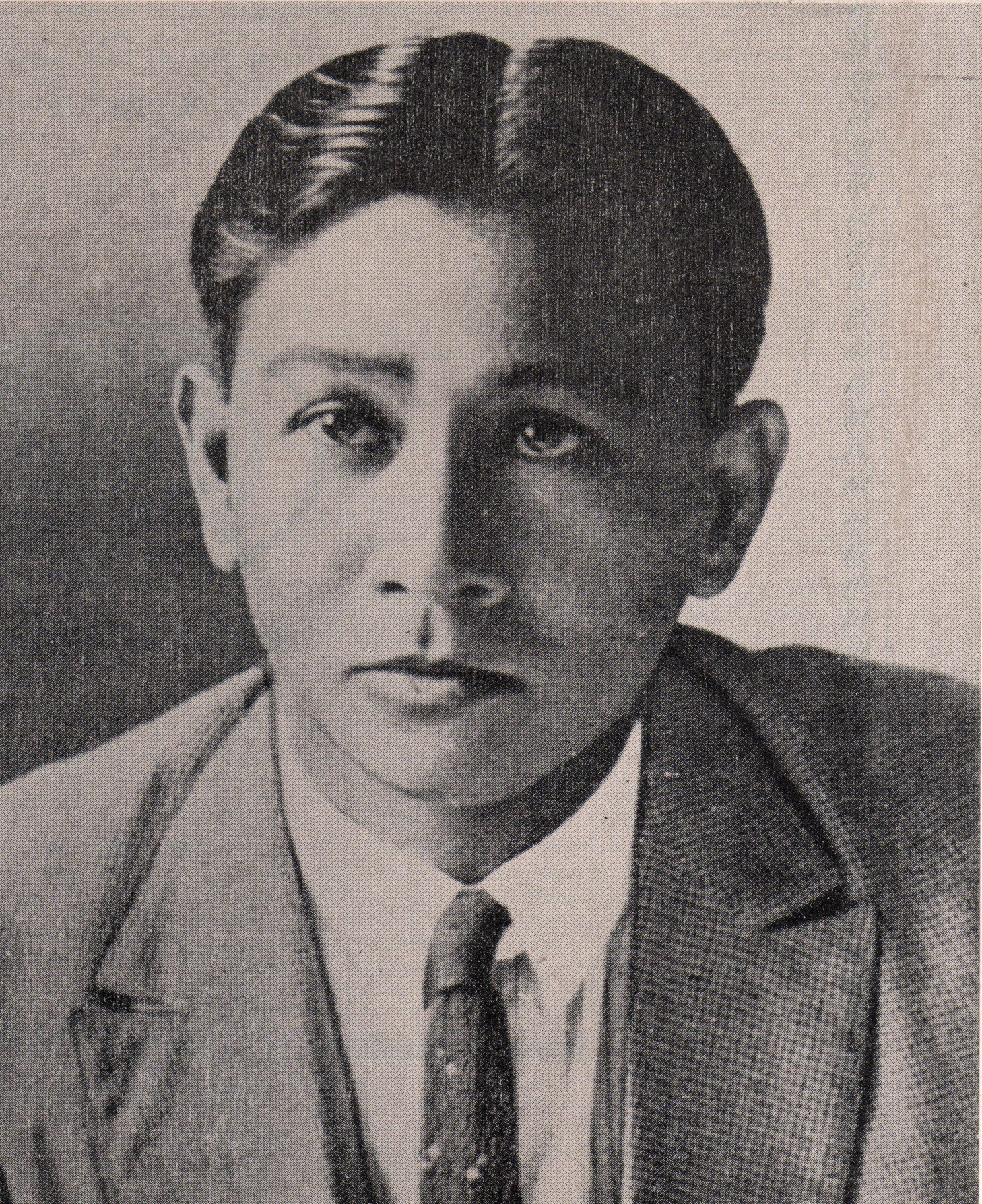

Senator of the Philippines
- In office May 25, 1946 – June 6, 1951

Secretary of the Interior
- In office March 8, 1945 – July 10, 1945
- President: Sergio Osmeña
- Preceded by: José P. Laurel
- Succeeded by: Alfredo Montelibano Sr.

15th and 18th Governor of Iloilo
- In office 1942–1945
- Preceded by: Fermin Caram
- Succeeded by: Patricio Confesor
- In office 1938–1941
- Preceded by: Timoteo Y. Consing Sr.
- Succeeded by: Oscar Ledesma

Member of the National Assembly from Iloilo's 3rd district
- In office September 16, 1935 – December 30, 1938
- Preceded by: Atanasio Ampig (as Representative)
- Succeeded by: Atanasio Ampig

Member of the House of Representatives from Iloilo's 3rd district
- In office 1922–1931
- Preceded by: José E. Locsin
- Succeeded by: Silvestre Villa

Personal details
- Born: Tomás Valenzuela Confesor; March 2, 1891 Cabatuan, Iloilo, Captaincy General of the Philippines
- Died: June 6, 1951 (aged 60) Manila, Philippines
- Party: Nacionalista (1938-1951)
- Spouse: Rosalina Javellana Grecia
- Children: 3
- Parents: Julian Confesor; Prospera Valenzuela
- Education: University of California; University of Chicago
- Occupation: Politician
- Awards: Philippine Legion of Honor, degree of commander

Military service
- Allegiance: Philippines
- Branch/service: Philippine Commonwealth Army
- Years of service: 1941–1945
- Battles/wars: World War II

Tomás Valenzuela Confesor (March 2, 1891 – June 6, 1951) was a Filipino politician and former Senator of the Philippines from 1946 to 1951. He was served as a governor of Iloilo and later, all of Panay Island during the Japanese occupation of the Philippines during World War II. Right after the war, he served as Mayor of Manila and secretary of the Philippine Department of the Interior under President Sergio Osmeña.

== Biography ==
Confesor was born to a "farmer-schoolteacher" in Iloilo. He graduated from the Iloilo High School. He then went to the United States, which then ruled the Philippines, and worked while attending the University of California for three years. In 1912, while at the University of California, he was a founder of a new pro-Philippine independence student newspaper called the Filipino Student. He later graduated from the University of Chicago in Illinois with a major in municipal government and economics. He earned a Bachelor of Science in commerce from the University of California and a Bachelor of Philosophy in economics from the University of Chicago.

When he returned to the Philippines, he was briefly a teacher. He served as supervisor of Jaro, Iloilo.v He was then elected to the Philippine Legislature in 1922 and served for three terms. In 1933, he was appointed by the Governor-General of the Philippines Theodore Roosevelt, Jr. as the Director of Commerce, the first Filipino to hold that office.

In 1934, he was elected to the Philippine Constitutional Convention that drafted the 1935 Constitution of the Philippines and was subsequently elected to the Philippine National Assembly, the body that replaced the Philippine Legislature.

=== World War II resistance leader on Panay ===
When Japan attacked the Philippines on December 8, 1941, Confesor was in Manila. He was chief of the National Cooperatives Association while also governor of Iloilo. He escaped to Panay on a small sailboat. He fled to the mountains of Panay along with his wife and children to help lead the resistance to the Japanese occupation. He led the civilian government first of Iloilo and then he was appointed by Philippine President Quezon as “wartime governor of Free Panay and Romblon”, which includes the provinces of Aklan, Antique, Capiz and Romblon. Macario Peralta, Jr. led the armed guerrillas on Panay. Confesor and Peralta frequently clashed.

During the war, the puppet governor of Iloilo urged Confesor to stop fighting. Confesor replied in what Time Magazine called a "classic of resistance literature": "This war has placed us in the crucible to assay the metal in our being. . . . You underrate the nobility and grandeur of the character and soul of the Filipino. . . . I will not surrender as long as I stand on my feet."

Immediately after the liberation of Manila from the Japanese, during which Manila was largely destroyed, he was appointed mayor of Manila. The destruction of Manila was so great that in Manila's business district only two buildings were not damaged and those two were looted of their plumbing. On April 8, 1945, he was also appointed Secretary of the Interior. Also after the war, he served as the Chief Philippine Delegate to the Far Eastern Commission.

In 1946, he was elected to the Philippine Senate.

== Positions on issues ==
In the 1946 presidential election he supported incumbent Pres. Osmeña of the Nacionalista Party over challenger and ultimate winner Manuel Roxas of the Nacionalista Party (Liberal wing) (the precursor to today's Liberal Party).

He opposed "parity rights", providing rights to Philippine natural resources to American citizens and corporations equal to Philippine citizens and corporations, as required by the U.S. Bell Trade Act and campaigned against approval of the parity rights constitutional amendment in the Philippine parity rights plebiscite of 1947.

== Honours ==
President Sergio Osmeña awarded Confesor the Philippine Legion of Honor, degree of commander.

== Death ==
Confesor died of a heart attack on June 6, 1951, during his Senate term. He was given a state funeral in 1951.

== See also ==
- List of Philippine legislators who died in office
