= Mount Porras =

Mountain in the Philippines

- Location within Philippines

Highest point
- Elevation: 868 m (2,848 ft)
- Coordinates: 10°45′46″N 122°8′22″E

Geography
- Country: Philippines
- Region: Western Visayas
- Province: Antique

Mount Porras is a mountain in the 5,511.47-hectare (13,619.1-acre) Tipulu-an Mau-it Rivers Watershed Forest Reserve, now known as Sibalom Natural Park. Sibalom Natural Park is located in the municipality of Sibalom, Antique, Panay Island, which was proclaimed a natural park on 23 April 2000.
