= St. Anthony's College, San Jose de Buenavista =

Roman Catholic school in Antique, Philippines

St. Anthony College
- Motto: "Religio Artibus"
- Motto in English: "Religion Arts"
- Type: Private School
- Established: August 4, 1959
- Affiliation: Roman Catholic
- President: Rev. Fr. Edione R. Febrero, JCL
- Address: Bagumbayan, San Jose, Antique, Philippines; 10°44′32″N 121°56′31″E
- Colors
- Website: Sac.Edu.ph

St. Anthony's College is a private Catholic school in San Jose de Buenavista, Antique, Philippines.

== History ==
Before 1958, none of the Catholic educational institutions already in existence in Antique offers both Basic Education and Higher Education. This changed in 1958 after the Mill Hill Missionaries purchased Antique Academy and renamed it St. Anthony's College.

In June 1959, the school site was transferred to a five-hectare lot in Bagumbayan, Antique under the management of the Mill Hill Missionaries. In that same year on August 4, St. Anthony's College was registered with the Securities and Exchange Commission. In 1976, the College was handed over by the Mill Hill Missionaries to the Prelature of San Jose de Antique which in 1983 became the Diocese of San Jose de Antique.

From the time the College was bought, it was managed by a Mill Hill Father as the College President. However, four years after the declaration of Martial Law, a decree was passed barring foreign nationals from holding key positions or public office in the country; hence in 1976, Fr. Joaquin A. Dioso Jr., a Filipino and an Antiqueño Diocesan priest, became the sixth College President. After him, other Diocesan priests served as College Presidents: Rev. Fr. Fortunato M. Abiera (7th), Rev. Fr. Jose Romeo O. Lazo (8th), Rev. Fr. Nicolas A. Rendon (9th), Rev. Fr. Cornelio V. Ysulat, Jr. (10th), and Rev. Fr. Jose S. Bantolo (11th).
