= Mao-it River =

River in Antique, Philippines

- Location within Visayas Location within Philippines

Location
- Country: Philippines
- Region: Western Visayas
- Province: Antique

Physical characteristics
- Source
  - coordinates: 10°45′46″N 122°8′22″E
- Mouth: Sibalom River
  - coordinates: 10°47′29″N 122°01′46″E
- Length: 15.8 km (9.8 mi) (9.8 miles)

Basin features
- Progression: Mao-it–Sibalom

The Mao-it River is a tributary of the Sibalom River located in Antique province in the Philippines.
