= Tipulu-an River =

River in Antique, Philippines

Location
- Country: Philippines
- Region: Western Visayas
- Province: Antique

Physical characteristics
- Source
  - coordinates: 10°45′46″N 122°8′22″E
- Mouth: Sibalom River
- Length: 33.1 km (20.6 mi)

Basin features
- Progression: Tipulu-an–Sibalom

The Tipulu-an River is a tributary of the Sibalom River located in Antique province in the Philippines.
