= Zarraga =

Municipality in Iloilo, Philippines

- Municipality
- Municipality of Zarraga
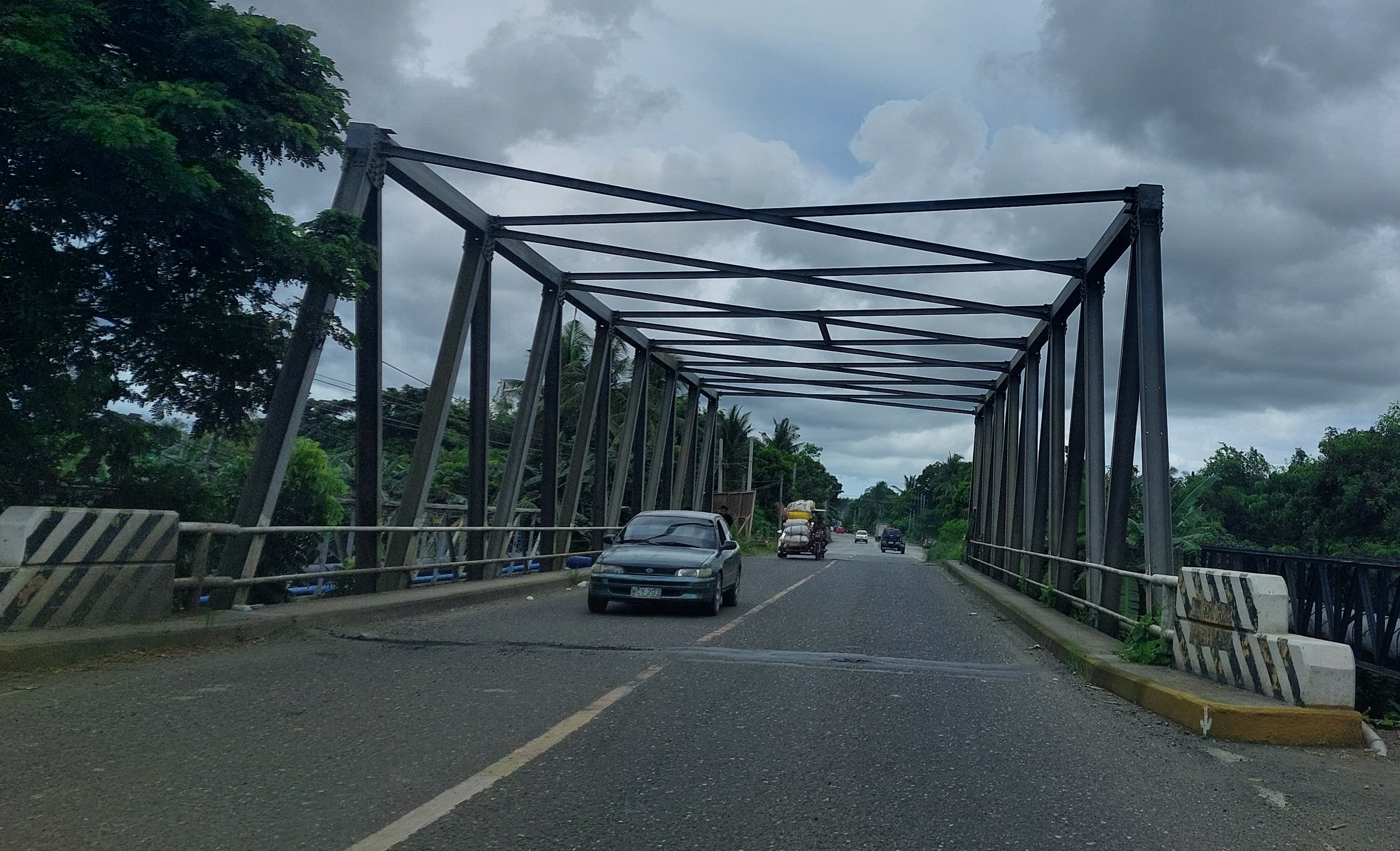
- Sigangao Bridge

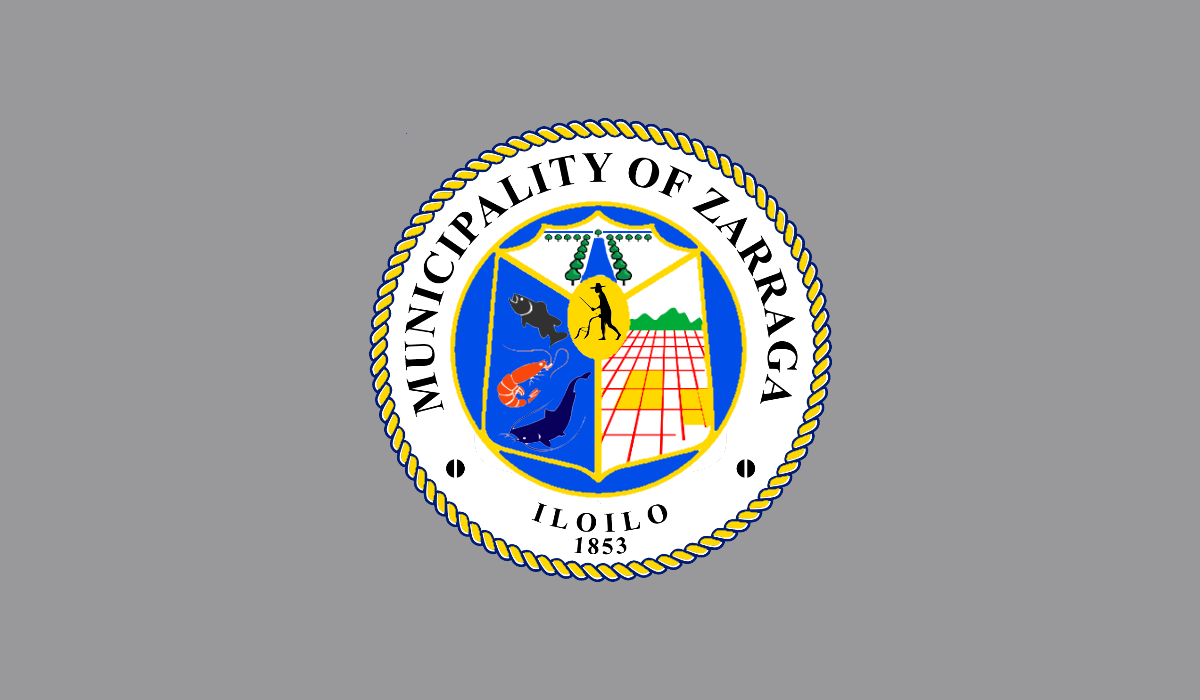
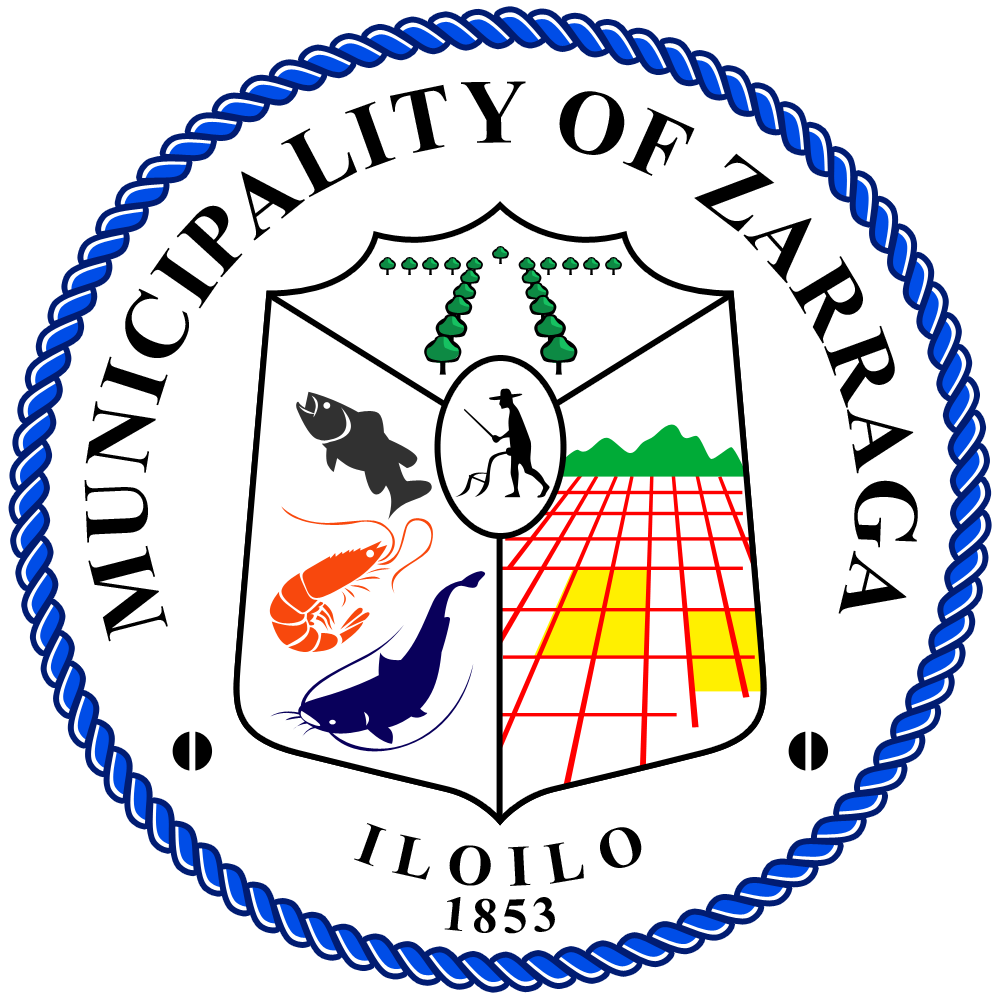
- Flag Seal

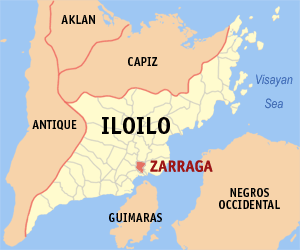
- Map of Iloilo with Zarraga highlighted
- Interactive map of Zarraga
- Location within the Philippines
- Coordinates: 10°49′N 122°36′E
- Country: Philippines
- Region: Western Visayas
- Province: Iloilo
- District: 2nd district
- Barangays: 24 (see Barangays)

Government
  - Type: Sangguniang Bayan
  - Mayor: Jeffrey M. Silveo (Nacionalista)
  - Vice Mayor: Laurence John B. Sortigosa (Nacionalista)
  - Representative: Kathryn Joyce F. Gorriceta (Lakas)
  - Municipal Council: Members: Jose Erwin S. Guadalupe (Nacionalista); Jose Jeffren P. Millan (Nacionalista); Noel G. Martirizar (PFP); Imarie P. Malaca (PFP); Reynaldo A. Matutina (PFP); Kein C. Puertollano (Nacionalista); Mark Vincent S. Fabresis (Nacionalista); Jerome M. Marañon (Nacionalista); Arturo G. Doronila ^{‡}; Nyck Harvey G. Fabresis ^{◌}; ‡ ex officio ABC president; ◌ ex officio SK chairman
  - Electorate: 19,091 voters (2025)

Area
  - Total: 54.48 km^{2} (21.03 sq mi)
- Elevation: 11 m (36 ft)
- Highest elevation: 79 m (259 ft)
- Lowest elevation: −1 m (−3.3 ft)

Population (2024 census)
  - Total: 27,852
  - Density: 511.2/km^{2} (1,324/sq mi)
  - Households: 6,851

Economy
  - Income class: 3rd municipal income class
  - Poverty incidence: 8.41% (2023)
  - Revenue: ₱ 148.9 million (2024)
  - Assets: ₱ 592.6 million (2024)
  - Expenditure: ₱ 123.1 million (2024)
  - Liabilities: ₱ 173.2 million (2024)

Service provider
  - Electricity: Iloilo 2 Electric Cooperative (ILECO 2)
- Time zone: UTC+8 (PST)
- ZIP code: 5004
- PSGC: 063047000
- IDD : area code: +63 (0)33
- Native languages: Hiligaynon; Karay-a; Tagalog

Zarraga, officially the Municipality of Zarraga (Hiligaynon: Banwa sang Zarraga, Kinaray-a: Banwa kang Zarraga, Tagalog: Bayan ng Zarraga), is a municipality in the province of Iloilo , Philippines. According to the 2024 census, it has a population of 27,852 people.

== Geography ==
Zarraga is 16 kilometres (9.9 mi) north from Iloilo City.

=== Barangays ===
Zarraga is politically subdivided into 24 barangays. Each barangay consists of puroks and some have sitios.

- Balud Lilo-an
- Balud I
- Balud II
- Dawis Centro
- Dawis Norte
- Dawis Sur
- Gines
- Inagdangan Centro
- Inagdangan Norte
- Inagdangan Sur
- Jalaud Norte
- Jalaud Sur
- Libongcogon
- Malunang
- Pajo
- Ilawod Poblacion
- Ilaya Poblacion
- Sambag
- Sigangao
- Talauguis
- Talibong
- Tubigan
- Tuburan
- Tuburan Sulbod - this barangay was transferred from Santa Barbara in 1948.

=== Climate ===
Climate data for Zarraga, Iloilo
Month	Jan	Feb	Mar	Apr	May	Jun	Jul	Aug	Sep	Oct	Nov	Dec	Year
Mean daily maximum °C (°F)	28 (82)	29 (84)	30 (86)	32 (90)	32 (90)	31 (88)	30 (86)	29 (84)	29 (84)	29 (84)	29 (84)	28 (82)	30 (85)
Mean daily minimum °C (°F)	23 (73)	23 (73)	23 (73)	24 (75)	25 (77)	25 (77)	25 (77)	24 (75)	24 (75)	24 (75)	24 (75)	23 (73)	24 (75)
Average precipitation mm (inches)	57 (2.2)	37 (1.5)	41 (1.6)	42 (1.7)	98 (3.9)	155 (6.1)	187 (7.4)	162 (6.4)	179 (7.0)	188 (7.4)	114 (4.5)	78 (3.1)	1,338 (52.8)
Average rainy days	12.0	7.7	9.2	10.2	19.5	24.6	26.9	25.1	25.5	25.2	18.0	13.0	216.9
Source: Meteoblue

== Demographics ==
Population census of Zarraga
Year	Pop.	±% p.a.
1903	6,583	—
1948	7,943	+0.42%
1960	8,666	+0.73%
1970	10,410	+1.85%
1975	11,449	+1.93%
1980	12,673	+2.05%
1990	15,483	+2.02%
1995	17,519	+2.34%
2000	18,252	+0.88%
2007	21,458	+2.26%
2010	23,693	+3.67%
2015	25,605	+1.49%
2020	27,305	+1.36%
2024	27,852	+0.48%
Source: Philippine Statistics Authority

In the 2024 census, the population of Zarraga was 27,852 people, with a density of 510 inhabitants per square kilometre or 1,300 inhabitants per square mile.

== Economy ==
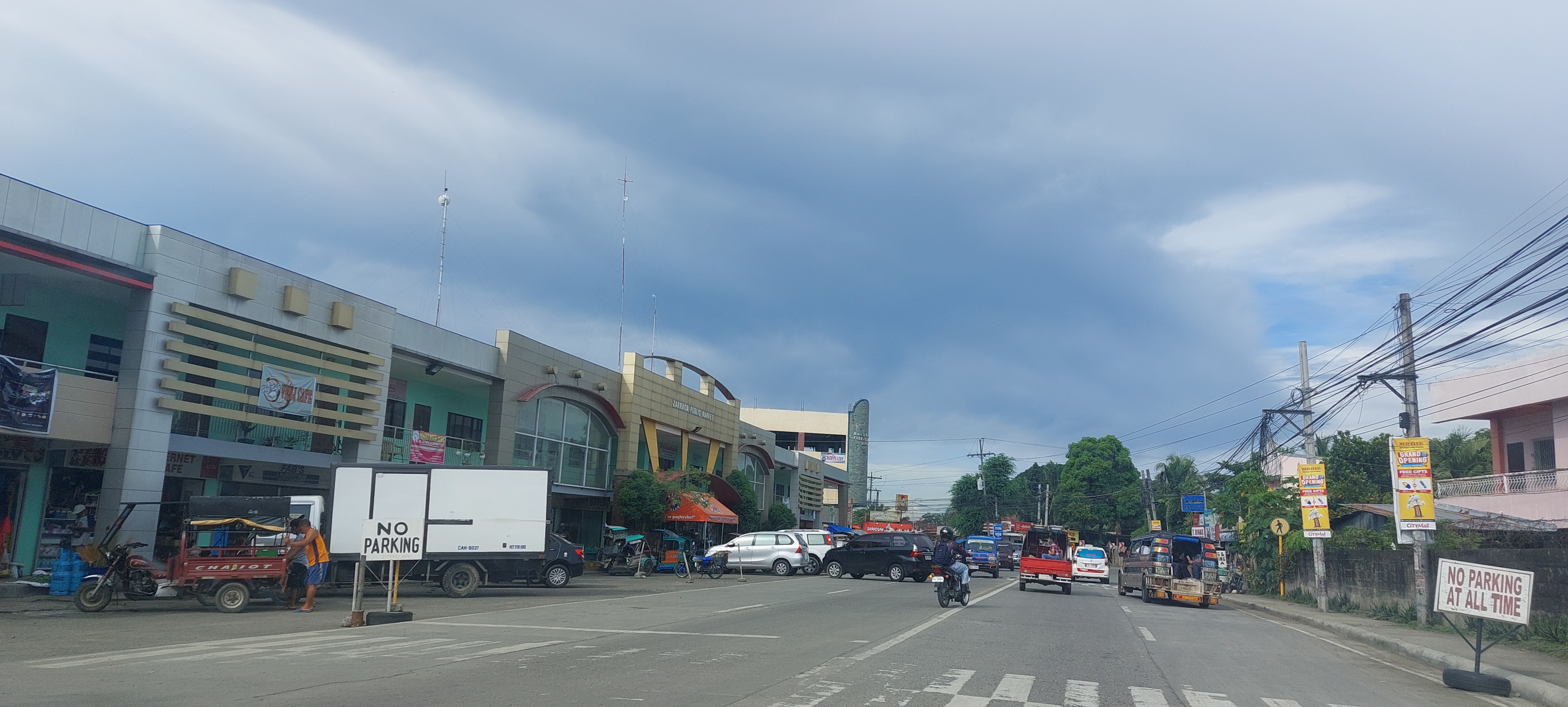
Zarraga Public Market

Poverty incidence of Zarraga (%)

Source: Philippine Statistics Authority
