= San Miguel, Iloilo =

Municipality in Iloilo, Philippines

San Miguel
- Municipality
- Municipality of San Miguel
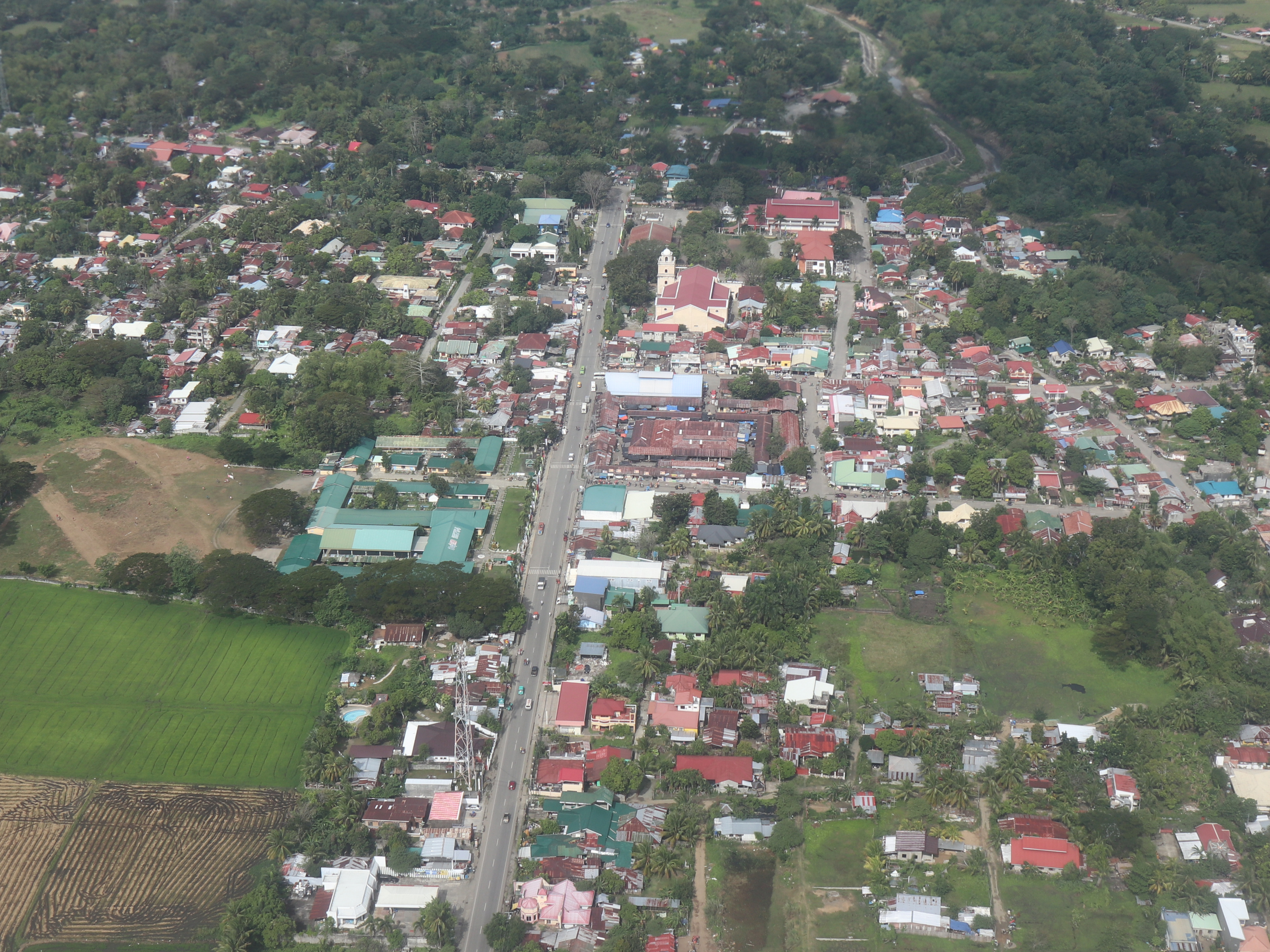
- Aerial view of San Miguel

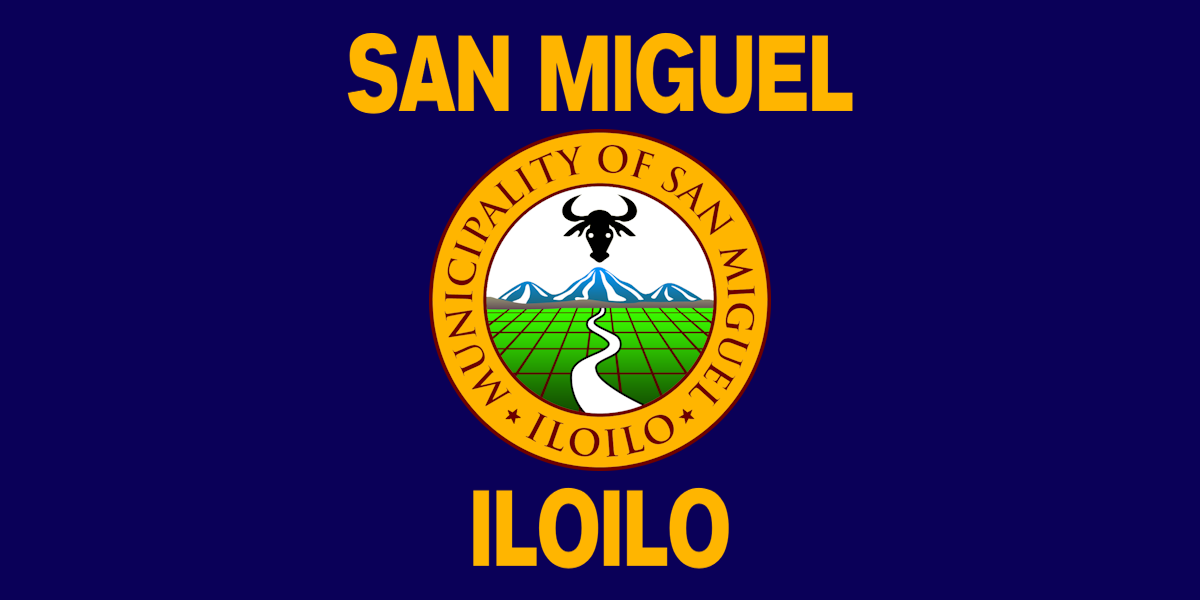
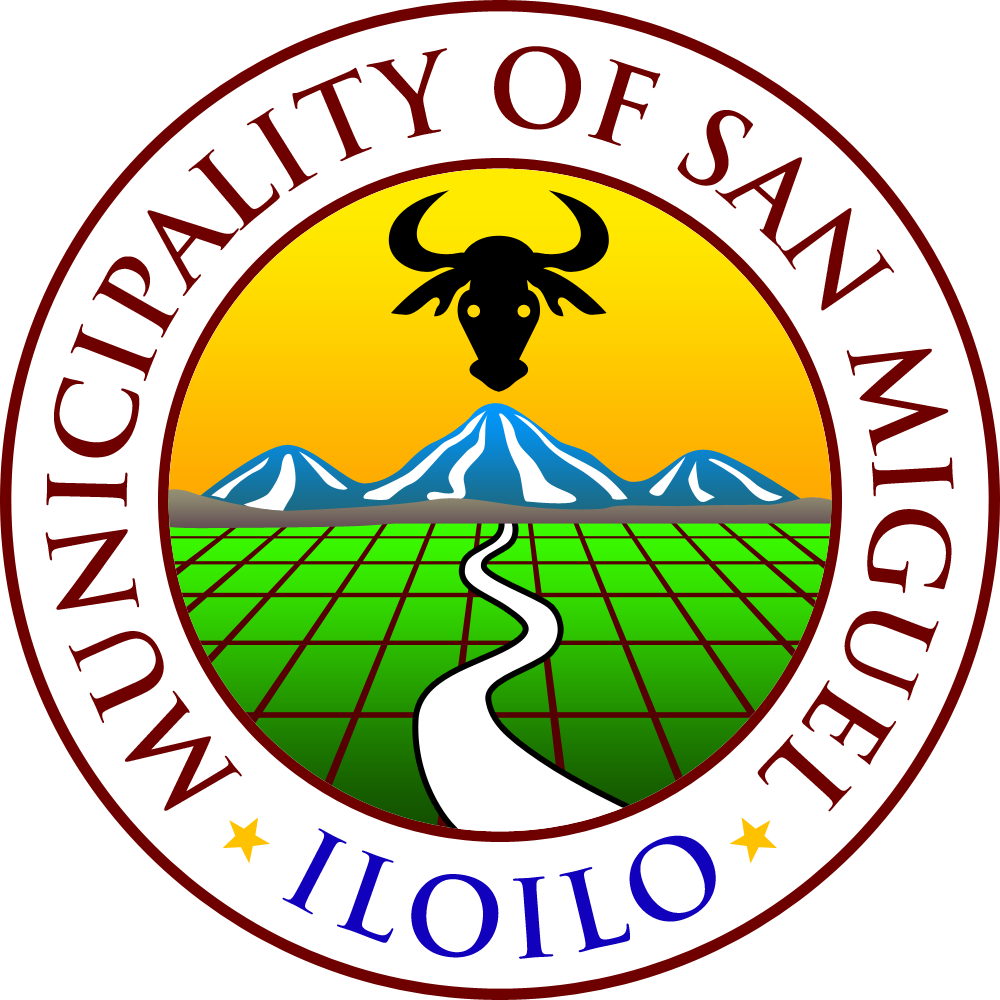
- Flag Seal

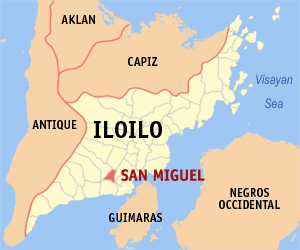
- Map of Iloilo with San Miguel highlighted
- Interactive map of San Miguel
- Location within the Philippines
- Coordinates: 10°47′N 122°28′E
- Country: Philippines
- Region: Western Visayas
- Province: Iloilo
- District: 2nd district
- Barangays: 24 (see Barangays)

Government
  - Type: Sangguniang Bayan
  - Mayor: Bonifacio S. Salapantan, Jr. (PFP)
  - Vice Mayor: Rochin Sherwin S. Sanchez (PFP)
  - Representative: Kathryn Joyce F. Gorriceta (Lakas)
  - Municipal Council: Members: Bernie S. Saul (Nacionalista); Je S. Mondejar (PFP); Elsie G. Sorongon (PFP); Frince Pal M. Sales (Nacionalista); Rogelio S. Cabanalan, Jr. (Nacionalista); Teresita T. Sabijon (PFP); George S. Delgado (Lakas); Miguel S. Garillos (Nacionalista); Michael S. Salaveria ^{‡}; Kierstine Nicole C. Manglallan ^{◌}; ‡ ex officio ABC president; ◌ ex officio SK chairman
  - Electorate: 21,223 voters (2025)

Area
  - Total: 31.97 km^{2} (12.34 sq mi)
- Elevation: 42 m (138 ft)
- Highest elevation: 194 m (636 ft)
- Lowest elevation: 13 m (43 ft)

Population (2024 census)
  - Total: 31,093
  - Density: 972.6/km^{2} (2,519/sq mi)
  - Households: 7,371

Economy
  - Income class: 3rd municipal income class
  - Poverty incidence: 9.17% (2023)
  - Revenue: ₱ 169.1 million (2024)
  - Assets: ₱ 661.2 million (2024)
  - Expenditure: ₱ 140.2 million (2024)
  - Liabilities: ₱ 66.04 million (2024)

Service provider
  - Electricity: Iloilo 1 Electric Cooperative (ILECO 1)
- Time zone: UTC+8 (PST)
- ZIP code: 5025
- PSGC: 063041000
- IDD : area code: +63 (0)33
- Native languages: Hiligaynon; Karay-a; Ati; Tagalog
- Website: www.sanmiguel-iloilo.gov.ph

San Miguel, officially the Municipality of San Miguel (Hiligaynon: Banwa sang San Miguel, Kinaray-a: Banwa kang San Miguel, Tagalog: Bayan ng San Miguel), is a municipality in the province of Iloilo, Philippines. According to the 2024 census, it has a population of 31,093 people. San Miguel is a part of the Metro Iloilo–Guimaras area, centered on Iloilo City.

It is the site of Aganan River Dam, which is an agricultural purpose dam used for irrigation of the ricefields in the surrounding towns. Pepsi Bottlers Philippines Inc. has a bottling plant in San Miguel, which supplies Pepsi products in Panay Island.

== Geography ==
San Miguel is 17 kilometres (11 mi) northeast of Iloilo City and 8 kilometres (5.0 mi) from Alimodian. The municipality is bordered by Cabatuan in the north, Santa Barbara and Pavia in the east, Alimodian and Leon in the west, and by Oton in the south. Southeast of San Miguel is Mandurriao district of Iloilo City.

=== Barangays ===
San Miguel is politically subdivided into 24 barangays. Each barangay consists of puroks and some have sitios.

- Barangay 1 Poblacion (Roxas St.)
- Barangay 2 Poblacion (Salvilla Santo Rosario)
- Barangay 3 Poblacion (A.S. Suarez St. Zone 1)
- Barangay 4 Poblacion (A.S. Suarez East)
- Barangay 5 Poblacion (Santiago St. North)
- Barangay 6 Poblacion (Santiago St. South)
- Barangay 7 Poblacion (San Roque St. South)
- Barangay 8 Poblacion (Montaño-San Roque)
- Barangay 9 Poblacion (Salazar San Jose)
- Barangay 10 Poblacion (R.V. Sanchez St. South)
- Barangay 11 Poblacion (R.V. Sanchez St. North)
- Barangay 12 Poblacion (Sales Malaga Saliedo)
- Barangay 13 Poblacion (SantaRita-Saclauso St.)
- Barangay 14 Poblacion (San Miguel North)
- Barangay 15 Poblacion (San Miguel South)
- Barangay 16 Poblacion (San Agustin St.)
- Consolacion
- Igtambo
- San Antonio
- San Jose
- Santa Cruz
- Santa Teresa
- Santo Angel
- Santo Niño

=== Climate ===
Climate data for San Miguel, Iloilo
Month	Jan	Feb	Mar	Apr	May	Jun	Jul	Aug	Sep	Oct	Nov	Dec	Year
Mean daily maximum °C (°F)	30 (86)	31 (88)	32 (90)	33 (91)	32 (90)	30 (86)	29 (84)	29 (84)	29 (84)	29 (84)	30 (86)	30 (86)	30 (87)
Mean daily minimum °C (°F)	21 (70)	21 (70)	22 (72)	23 (73)	24 (75)	25 (77)	24 (75)	24 (75)	24 (75)	24 (75)	23 (73)	22 (72)	23 (74)
Average precipitation mm (inches)	19 (0.7)	17 (0.7)	26 (1.0)	37 (1.5)	119 (4.7)	191 (7.5)	258 (10.2)	260 (10.2)	248 (9.8)	196 (7.7)	97 (3.8)	39 (1.5)	1,507 (59.3)
Average rainy days	7.2	5.2	8.3	11.9	22.3	26.5	28.3	28.2	27.3	26.4	18.7	11.8	222.1
Source: Meteoblue

== Demographics ==
Population census of San Miguel
Year	Pop.	±% p.a.
1903	5,378	—
1918	5,079	−0.38%
1939	7,153	+1.64%
1948	8,453	+1.87%
1960	10,014	+1.42%
1970	12,033	+1.85%
1975	12,635	+0.98%
1980	14,241	+2.42%
1990	17,606	+2.14%
1995	18,819	+1.26%
2000	20,754	+2.12%
2007	23,804	+1.91%
2010	25,013	+1.82%
2015	27,686	+1.95%
2020	30,115	+1.79%
2024	31,093	+0.77%
Source: Philippine Statistics Authority

In the 2024 census, the population of San Miguel was 31,093 people, with a density of 970 inhabitants per square kilometre or 2,500 inhabitants per square mile.

=== Languages ===
Hiligaynon is the main language used by the residents. Karay-a is also spoken as a secondary language, especially in the northeastern part bordering the municipalities of Cabatuan and Leon. Tagalog and English are also spoken.

=== Religion ===
Roman Catholicism is the most dominant religion in this municipality.

== Economy ==
Poverty incidence of San Miguel (%)

Source: Philippine Statistics Authority

== Government ==
=== List of Mayors ===
No.	Mayor	Terms in Office	No. of Terms
	Bonifacio Sampong Salapantan Jr.	2025-present	1 Term
	Marina Luz Sanchez Gorriceta	2016–2025	3 Terms
	Dunstan Claudio Sale	2013 - 2016	1 Term (appointed)
	Engr. Victor Suarez Saclauso	2010 - 2013	2 Terms
	Greg S. Villarico	2001 - 2010	3 Terms
	Atty. Avito S. Sacluaso	1992 - 2001	3 Terms
