= Gorriceta =

Gorriceta is a surname. Notable people with the surname include:

- Kathryn Joyce Gorriceta, Filipino politician
- Michael Gorriceta, Filipino politician
