= Leon, Iloilo =

Municipality in Iloilo, Philippines

Leon
- Municipality
- Municipality of Leon
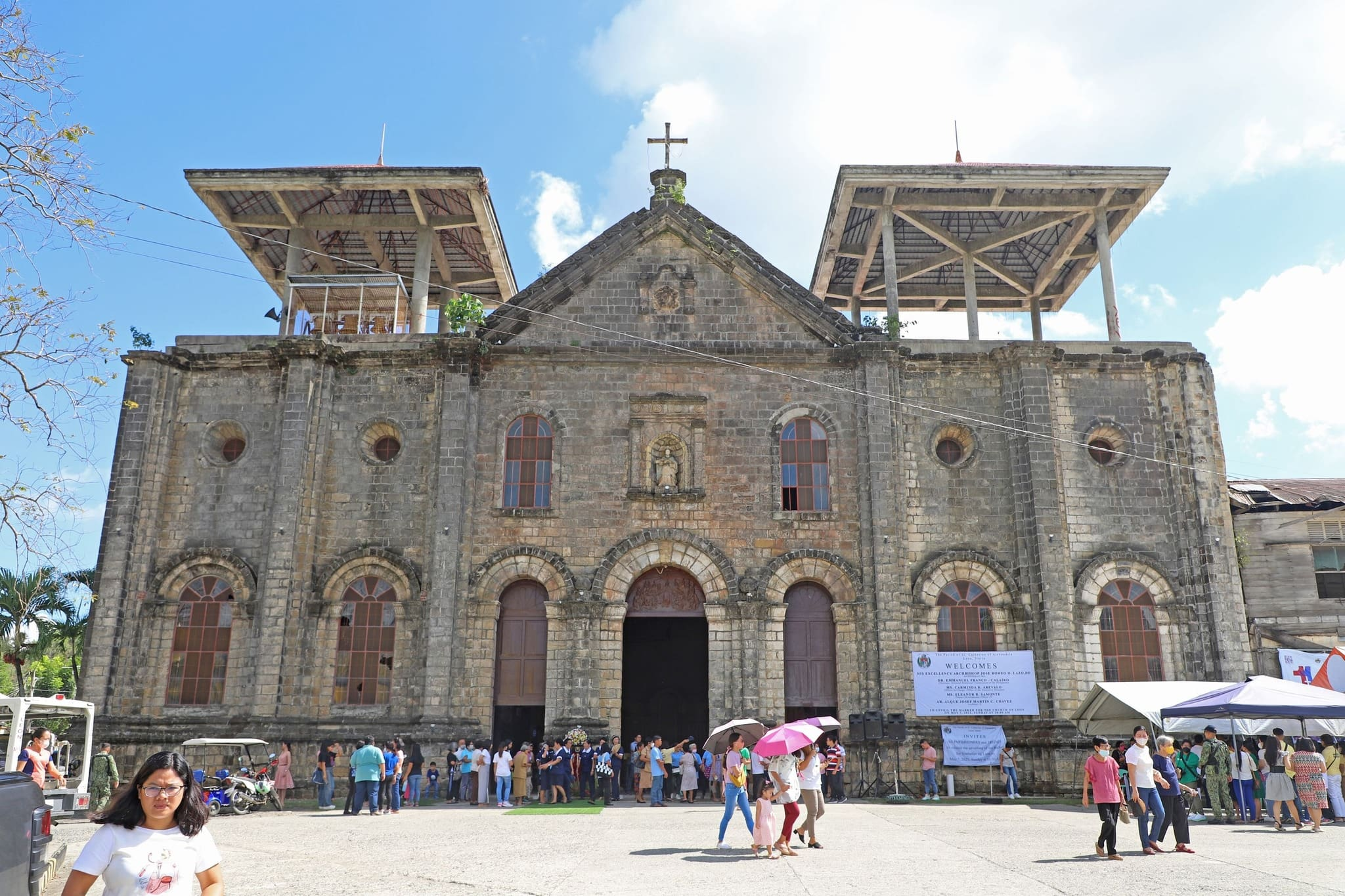
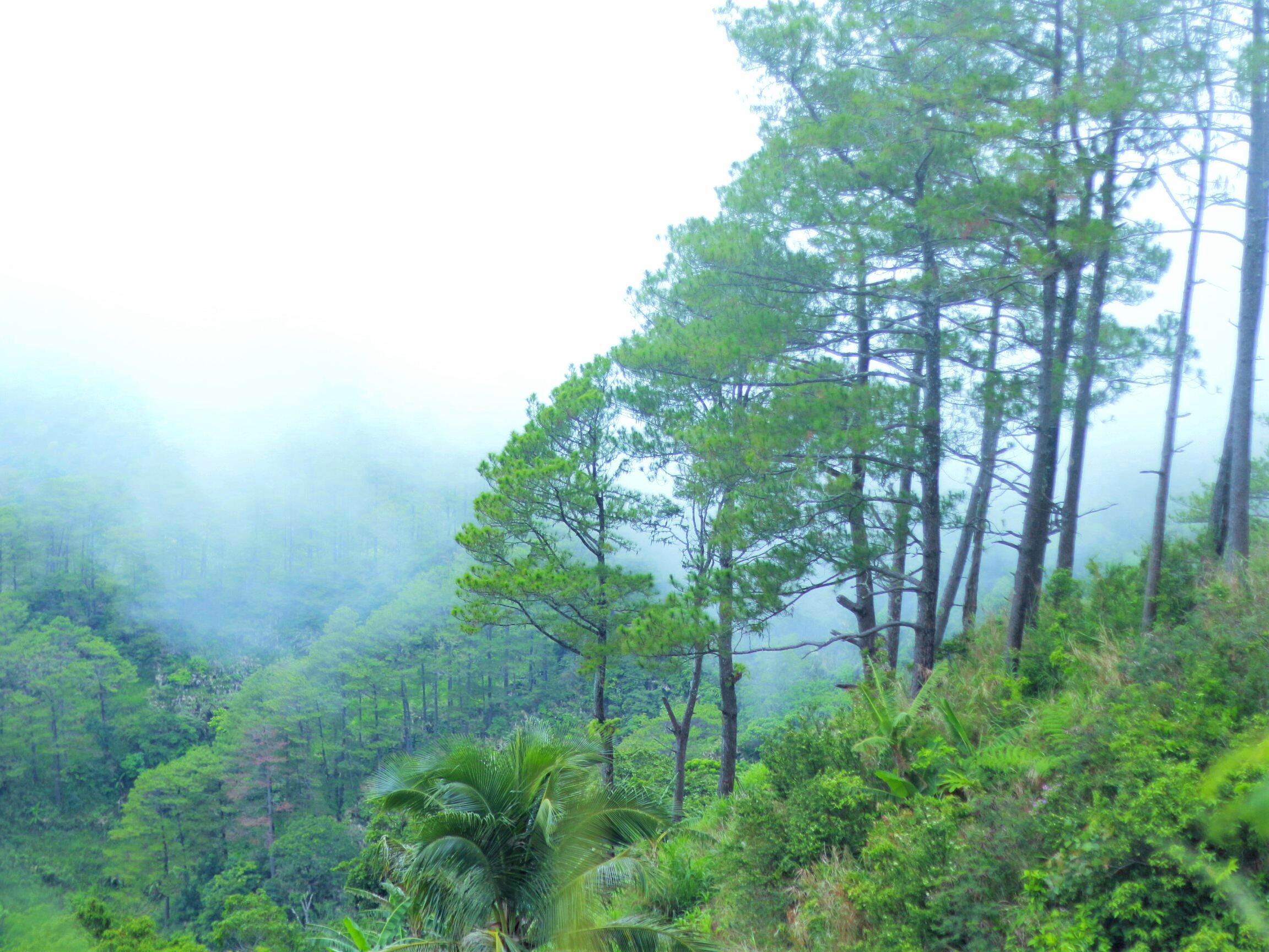
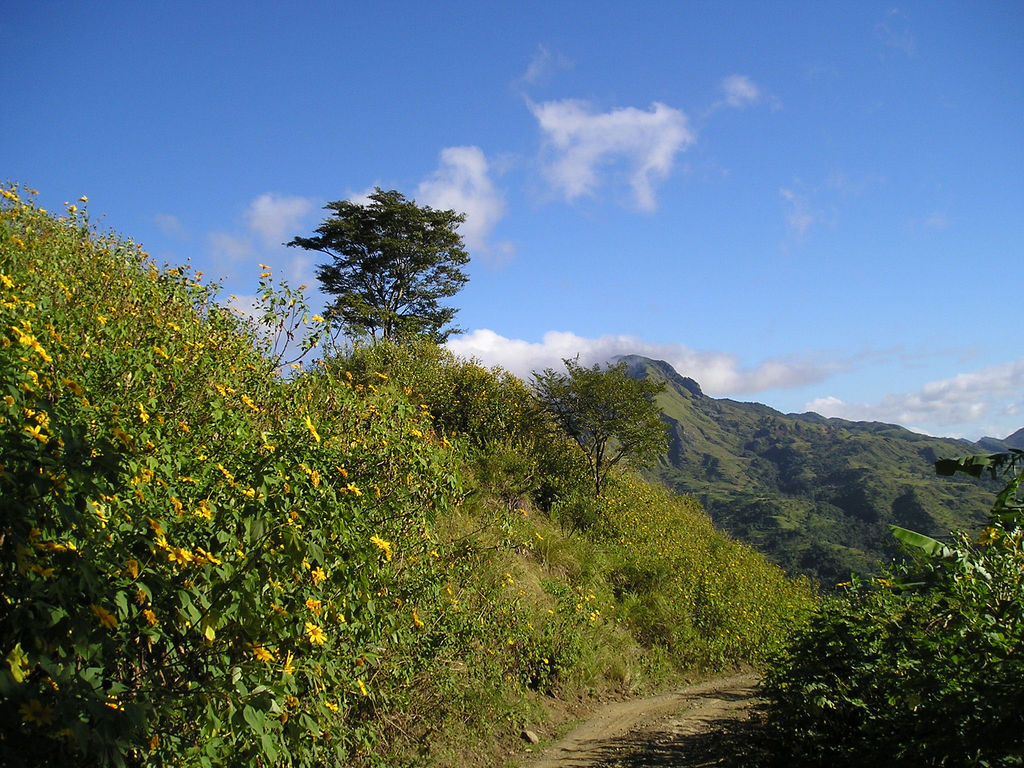
- (from top: left to right) Leon Church; Bucari Pine Forest; Bucari Mountain

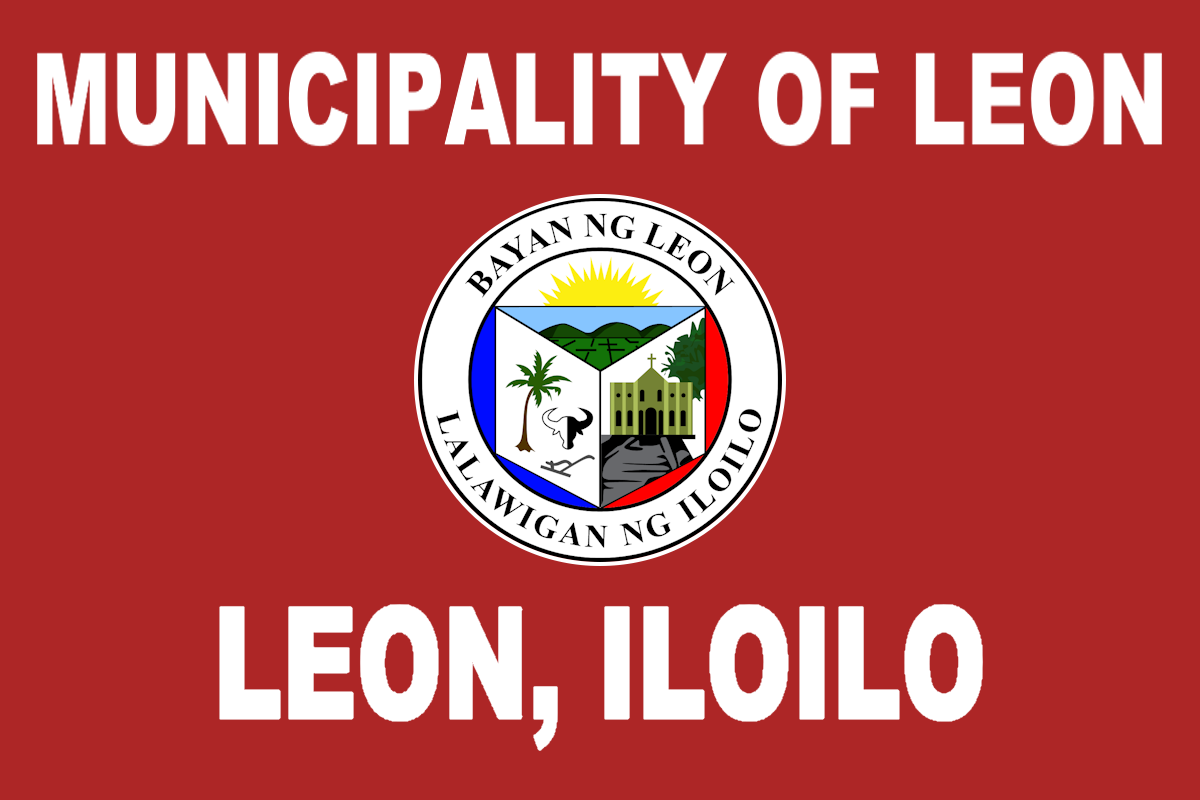
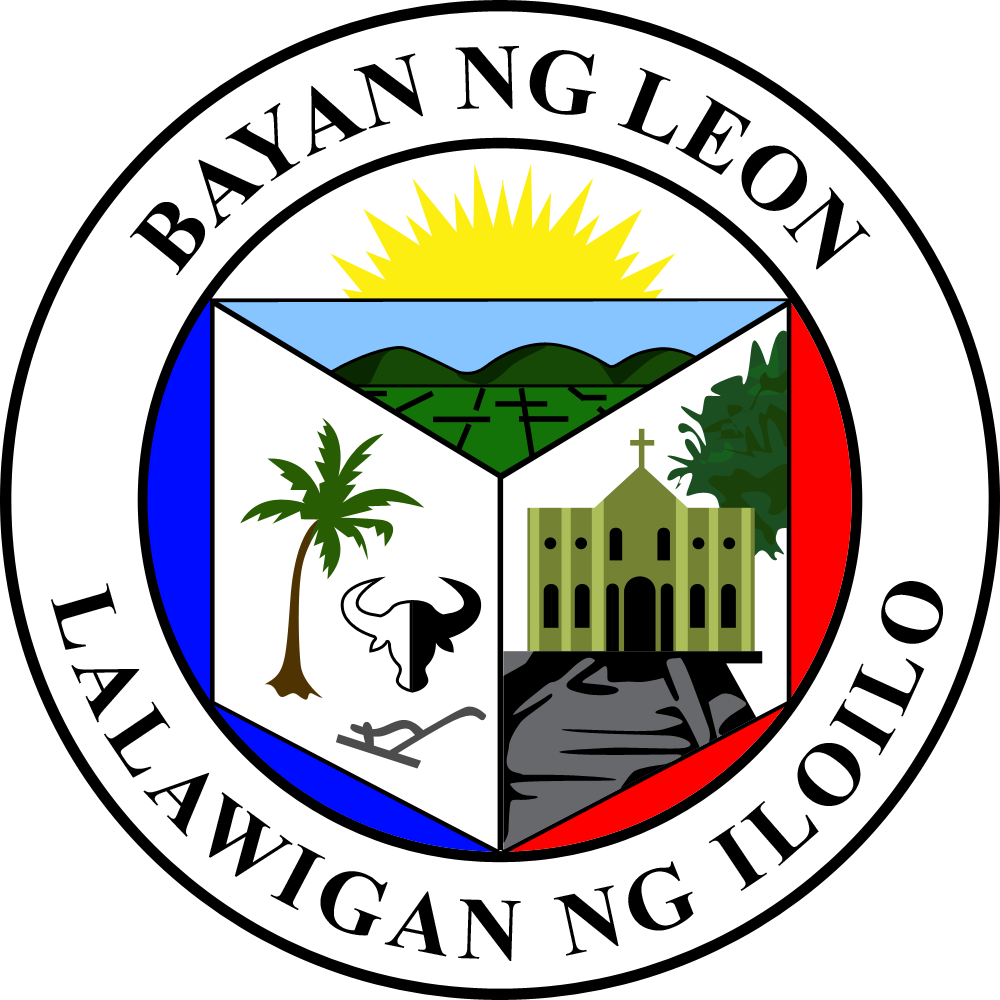
- Flag Seal
- Nicknames: "Summer Capital of Iloilo", "Vegetable Garden of Iloilo"
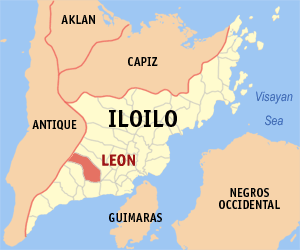
- Map of Iloilo with Leon highlighted
- Interactive map of Leon
- Location within the Philippines
- Coordinates: 10°46′51″N 122°23′22″E
- Country: Philippines
- Region: Western Visayas
- Province: Iloilo
- District: 2nd district
- Barangays: 85 (see Barangays)

Government
  - Type: Sangguniang Bayan
  - Mayor: Ma. Lina C. Holipas (Nacionalista)
  - Vice Mayor: Rey V. Capaque (Nacionalista)
  - Representative: Kathryn Joyce F. Gorriceta (Lakas)
  - Municipal Council: Members: Salvador C. Cabaluna, IV (Nacionalista); Jethro M. Caigoy (Nacionalista); Mary Japhet C. Capalla (Nacionalista); Wilane S. Calfoforo (Nacionalista); Hilario E. Taño (Nacionalista); Jann C. Cagampang (Nacionalista); Eric C. Camposano (Nacionalista); Ruben C. Calicaran (Nacionalista); Rey August T. Dela Gente ^{‡}; Trixie Jan C. Villacastin ^{◌}; ‡ ex officio ABC president; ◌ ex officio SK chairman
  - Electorate: 33,775 voters (2025)

Area
  - Total: 140.20 km^{2} (54.13 sq mi)
- Elevation: 209 m (686 ft)
- Highest elevation: 568 m (1,864 ft)
- Lowest elevation: 57 m (187 ft)

Population (2024 census)
  - Total: 52,777
  - Density: 376.44/km^{2} (974.98/sq mi)
  - Households: 12,173

Economy
  - Income class: 1st municipal income class
  - Poverty incidence: 16.36% (2023)
  - Revenue: ₱ 239.6 million (2024)
  - Assets: ₱ 927.6 million (2024)
  - Expenditure: ₱ 76.83 million (2024)
  - Liabilities: ₱ 226.2 million (2024)

Service provider
  - Electricity: Iloilo 1 Electric Cooperative (ILECO 1)
- Time zone: UTC+8 (PST)
- ZIP code: 5026
- PSGC: 0603028000
- IDD : area code: +63 (0)33
- Native languages: Karay-a; Hiligaynon; Tagalog
- Named after: León, Spain
- Website: www.leon.gov.ph

Leon, officially the Municipality of Leon (Hiligaynon: Banwa sang Leon, Kinaray-a: Banwa kang Leon, Tagalog: Bayan ng Leon), is a municipality in the province of Iloilo, Philippines. According to the 2024 census, it has a population of 52,777 people.

It is known as the "Vegetable Basket of Iloilo Province" due to its supply of asparagus, cabbages, baguio beans, sayote, eggplants, carrots and other vegetables.

A popular tourist attraction in the municipality is the Bucari Mountain Range, which is known as the Summer Capital of Iloilo and Vegetable Garden of Iloilo.

== Geography ==
Leon has a total land area of 14,020 hectares (34,600 acres) of which 276.16 hectares is classified as an urban area and 13,728.84 hectares as rural land. It is 36 kilometres (22 mi) from Iloilo City and 12 kilometres (7.5 mi) from Alimodian.

=== Barangays ===
Leon is politically subdivided into 85 barangays. Each barangay consists of puroks and some have sitios.

- Agboy Norte
- Agboy Sur
- Agta
- Ambulong
- Anonang
- Apian
- Avanzada
- Awis
- Ayabang
- Ayubo
- Bacolod
- Baje
- Banagan
- Barangbang
- Barasan
- Bayag Norte
- Bayag Sur
- Binolbog
- Biri Norte
- Biri Sur
- Bobon
- Bucari
- Buenavista
- Buga
- Bulad
- Bulwang
- Cabolo-an
- Cabunga-an
- Cabutongan
- Cagay
- Camandag
- Camando
- Cananaman
- Capt. Fernando
- Carara-an
- Carolina
- Cawilihan
- Coyugan Norte
- Coyugan Sur
- Danao
- Dorog
- Dusacan
- Gines
- Gumboc
- Igcadios
- Ingay
- Isian Norte
- Isian Victoria
- Jamog Gines
- Lanag
- Lang-og
- Ligtos
- Lonoc
- Lampaya
- Magcapay
- Maliao
- Malublub
- Manampunay
- Marirong
- Mina
- Mocol
- Nagbangi
- Nalbang
- Odong-odong
- Oluangan
- Omambong
- Paoy
- Pandan
- Panginman
- Pepe
- Poblacion
- Paga
- Salngan
- Samlague
- Siol Norte
- Siol Sur
- Tacuyong Norte
- Tacuyong Sur
- Tagsing
- Talacuan
- Ticuan
- Tina-an Norte
- Tina-an Sur
- Tunguan
- Tu-og

=== Climate ===
Climate data for Leon, Iloilo
Month	Jan	Feb	Mar	Apr	May	Jun	Jul	Aug	Sep	Oct	Nov	Dec	Year
Mean daily maximum °C (°F)	30 (86)	31 (88)	32 (90)	33 (91)	32 (90)	30 (86)	29 (84)	29 (84)	29 (84)	29 (84)	30 (86)	30 (86)	30 (87)
Mean daily minimum °C (°F)	21 (70)	21 (70)	22 (72)	23 (73)	25 (77)	25 (77)	25 (77)	24 (75)	24 (75)	24 (75)	23 (73)	22 (72)	23 (74)
Average precipitation mm (inches)	19 (0.7)	17 (0.7)	26 (1.0)	37 (1.5)	119 (4.7)	191 (7.5)	258 (10.2)	260 (10.2)	248 (9.8)	196 (7.7)	97 (3.8)	39 (1.5)	1,507 (59.3)
Average rainy days	7.2	5.2	8.3	11.9	22.3	26.5	28.3	28.2	27.3	26.4	18.7	11.8	222.1
Source: Meteoblue (modeled/calculated data, not measured locally)

== Demographics ==
Population census of Leon

Year	Pop.	±% p.a.
1903	10,277	—
1918	23,045	+5.53%
1939	20,797	−0.49%
1948	21,805	+0.53%
1960	25,099	+1.18%
1970	27,018	+0.74%
1975	30,185	+2.25%
1980	31,552	+0.89%

Year	Pop.	±% p.a.
1990	36,948	+1.59%
1995	41,043	+1.99%
2000	43,729	+1.37%
2007	45,647	+0.59%
2010	47,522	+1.48%
2015	49,875	+0.92%
2020	51,990	+0.88%
2024	52,777	+0.36%

Source: Philippine Statistics Authority

In the 2024 census, the population of Leon was 52,777 people, with a density of 380 inhabitants per square kilometre or 980 inhabitants per square mile.

== Economy ==
Poverty incidence of Leon (%)

Source: Philippine Statistics Authority
