= Bucari =

Barangay in Leon, Iloilo, Philippines

- Barangay and mountain resort
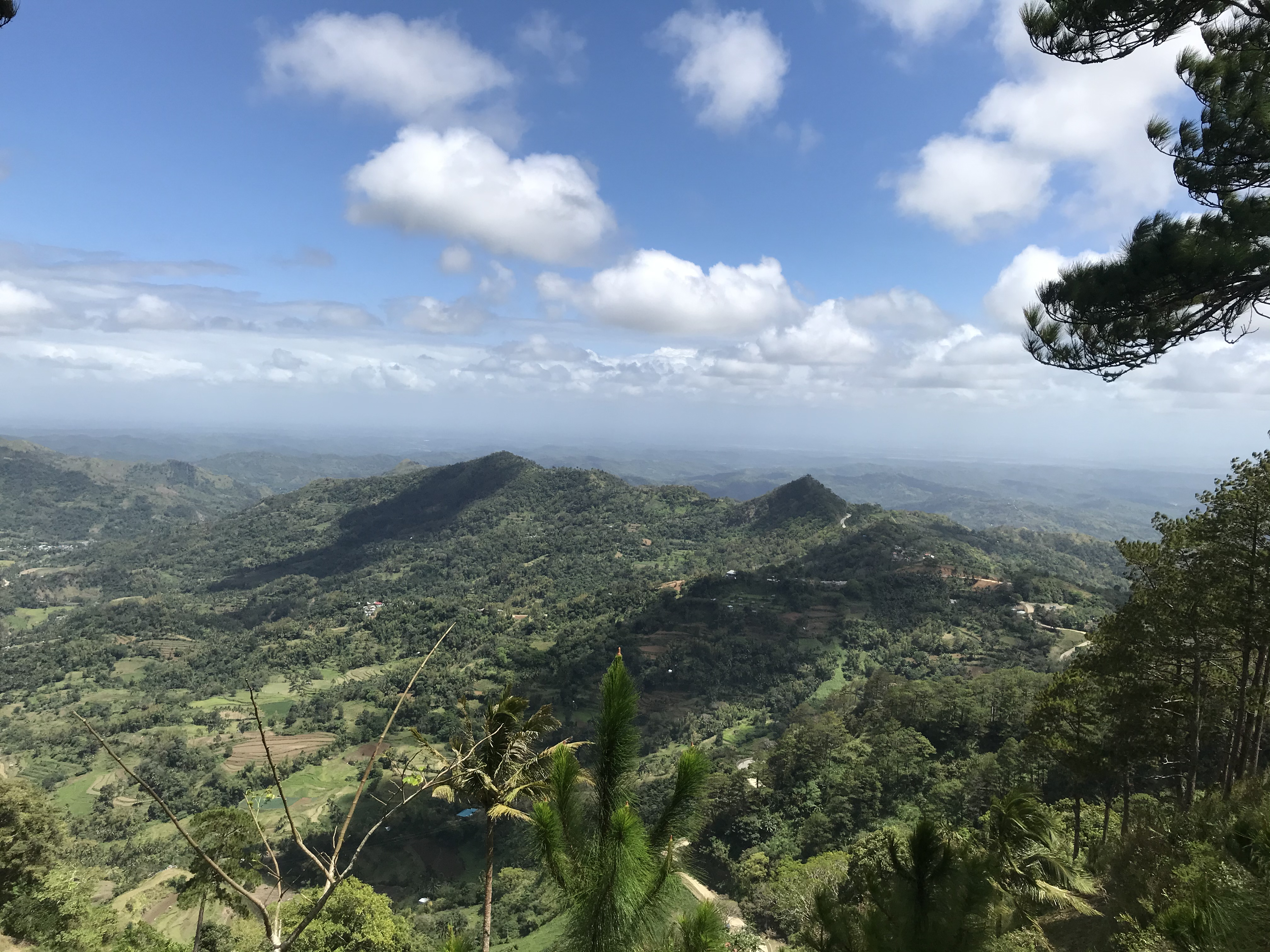
- Bucari aerial view
- Nickname: Summer Capital of Iloilo
- Interactive map of Bucari
- Location within the Philippines
- Coordinates: 10.8667°N 122.2893°E
- Country: Philippines
- Region: Western Visayas
- Province: Iloilo
- Municipality: Leon
- District: 2nd District

Government
  - Type: Barangay

Area
  - Total: 2.85 km^{2} (1.10 sq mi)
  - Greater Bucari: 104.33 km^{2} (40.28 sq mi)
- Highest elevation: 1,300 m (4,300 ft)
- Lowest elevation: 600 m (2,000 ft)

Population (2020)
  - Total: 1,606
- Time zone: UTC+8 (PST)
- Postal Code: 5026

Bucari is a barangay in the municipality of Leon, Iloilo, Philippines. It is a popular tourist destination in the province known for its cool climate and highland attractions, and often regarded as the summer capital of Iloilo and "little Baguio."

The term "Bucari" also refers to the broader area, which include 15 barangays in Leon (including Bucari itself) and 7 barangays in Alimodian (known as Seven Cities). The area has been declared a special economic zone for tourism and ecological enterprises.

== Geography ==
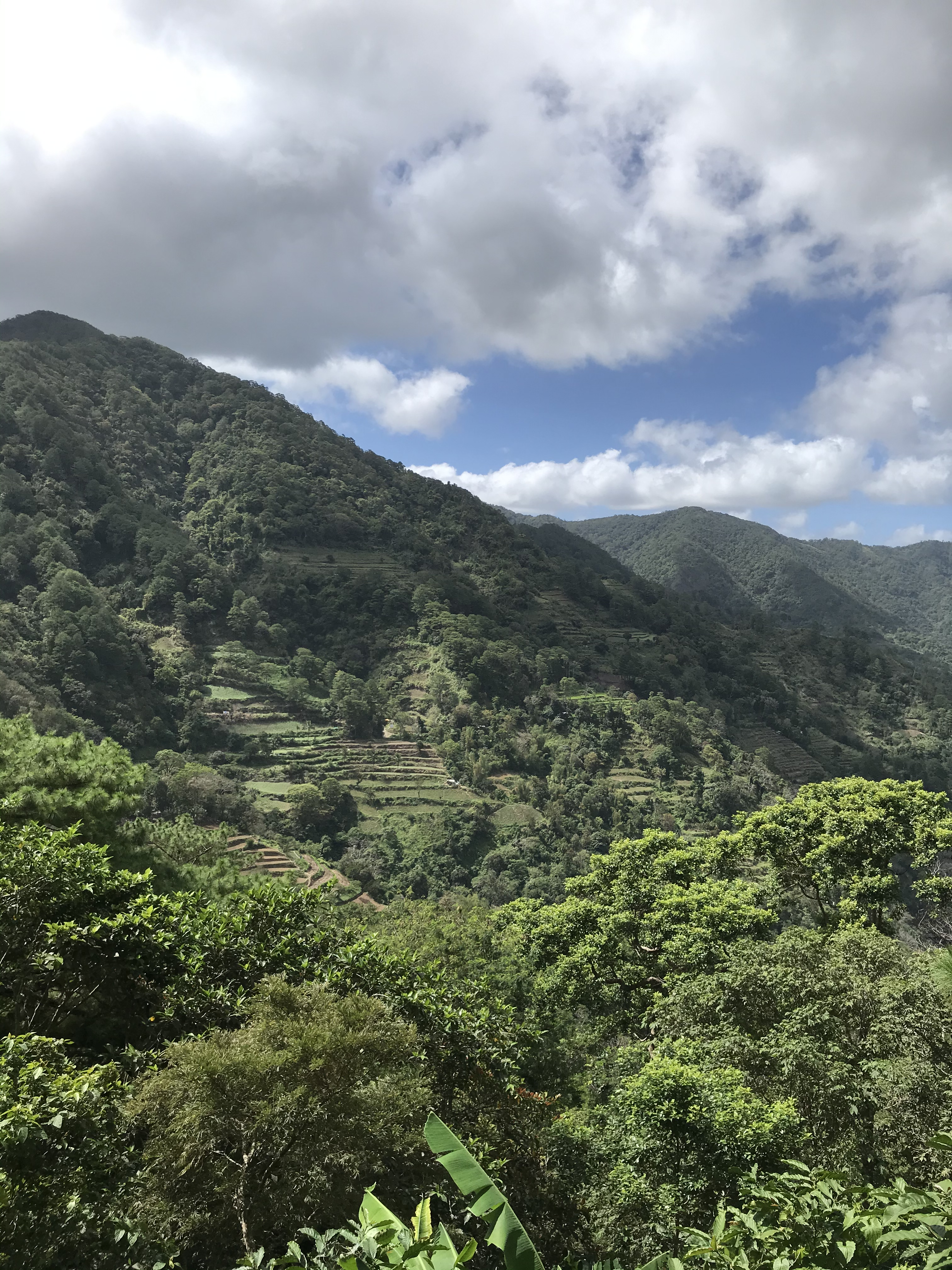
Rice terraces in Bucari

Bucari is located 20 kilometres (12 mi) from the town center of Leon and 58 kilometres (36 mi) from Iloilo City. It is bordered by several neighboring areas: Barangay Camandag to the north, Barangay Bacolod to the northeast, Barangay Maliao to the east, Barangay Tagsing to the southeast, Barangay Cawilihan to the south, Barangay Cagay to the southwest, and Barangay Panpanan II of San Remigio, Antique, to the west.

Barangay Bucari proper covers a total land area of 2.8536 km^{2} (1.1018 sq mi), while the Greater Bucari Area, which includes a total of 22 barangays, spans 74.90625 km^{2} (28.92146 sq mi) in Leon and 29.4225 km^{2} (11.3601 sq mi) in Alimodian, resulting in a combined total of 104.32875 km^{2} (40.28156 sq mi).

=== Topography ===
The region features diverse terrain and mountain ridges that are part of the Central Panay mountain range.

The average elevation of the populated mountain ridge is 764.5 metres (2,508 ft) above sea level, surrounding a valley that serves as the catchment area for the Aganan River. The highest point in the region reaches 1,300 metres (4,300 ft).

=== Climate ===
Temperatures in the area typically range from 18 to 20 °C (64 to 68 °F), with occasional dips to 10 °C (50 °F) during the wind-chill period from December to February.

== Demographics ==
Population census of Bucari
Year	Pop.	±% p.a.
1990	1,010	—
1995	1,035	+0.46%
2000	1,283	+4.71%
2007	1,380	+1.01%
2010	1,385	+0.13%
2015	1,448	+0.85%
2020	1,606	+2.20%
Source: Philippine Statistics Authority

In the 2020 census, the population of Bucari was 1,606 people.

== Flora and Fauna ==
The area is home to diverse fauna, including the Visayan warty pig, various snakes and lizards, hawks, frogs, hornbills, and monkeys. The endemic flora consists of pine trees, narra, teak, bacan, antipolo, hambabalop, mahogany, antosan-dilaw, kultingan, and undergrowth coffee.

== Tourist attractions ==
The Bucari Area features a range of attractions that highlight its natural and cultural significance. Pineridge Bucari is a spa resort that offers health and wellness services, along with climbing and exploration activities. It includes a restaurant with organic and gourmet menus. The Tabionan Reforestation Area covers nearly 5,000 hectares (12,000 acres) of 30- to 50-year-old pine trees.

Mansiga Cave, located in Tabionan, requires a descent of about 30 feet (9 meters) down a cliff to access its entrance. Susong Dalaga, or Ambassador Hill, is the highest point along the road to Bucari and features twin peaks. Imoy Falls, at the headwaters of the Aganan River in Barangay Camandag, includes clear waters surrounded by trees and wildflowers.

The Tomas Confesor Marker stands on a hill to commemorate Tomas Confesor, who established the Free Government of Panay and Romblon during World War II. Agua Colonia is a rainforest in Alimodian's Seven Cities. The Farm Terraces in the area demonstrate rich soil suitable for high-value crops.

Bato Duko (or Bato Dungok) is a rock formation resembling Pico de Loro, and Manipuron Hill in Barangay Tugaslon provides views of the plains and Iloilo City. Maslog Waterfalls are located in Barangay Lico, featuring a series of mini waterfalls within a forest.

Ibagat Spring offers mineral spring water in Alimodian, and Putting Bato in Barangay Cabacanan-Rizal is a large stone associated with local legend. The Umingan Plateau in Barangay Umingan consists of grasslands that blend with the surrounding atmosphere. Tinagong Danao, situated between Barangay Dao and Barangay Umingan, is known for its quest for hidden treasures, while Taruc Hills in Barangay Tabug provide scenic views and exploration opportunities.

Local farmers in the area cultivate a variety of vegetables, including asparagus, cauliflower, broccoli, cabbage, baguio beans, sayote, eggplant, and carrots, as well as fruits such as strawberries, mangoes, and bananas. Rice is grown in terraced fields. Currently, part of the area has been developed into a mountain resort, and future plans include the conversion of additional land into a national park and botanical garden.
