= Iloilo's 2nd congressional district =

Legislative district of the Philippines

- Constituency for the House of Representatives of the Philippines
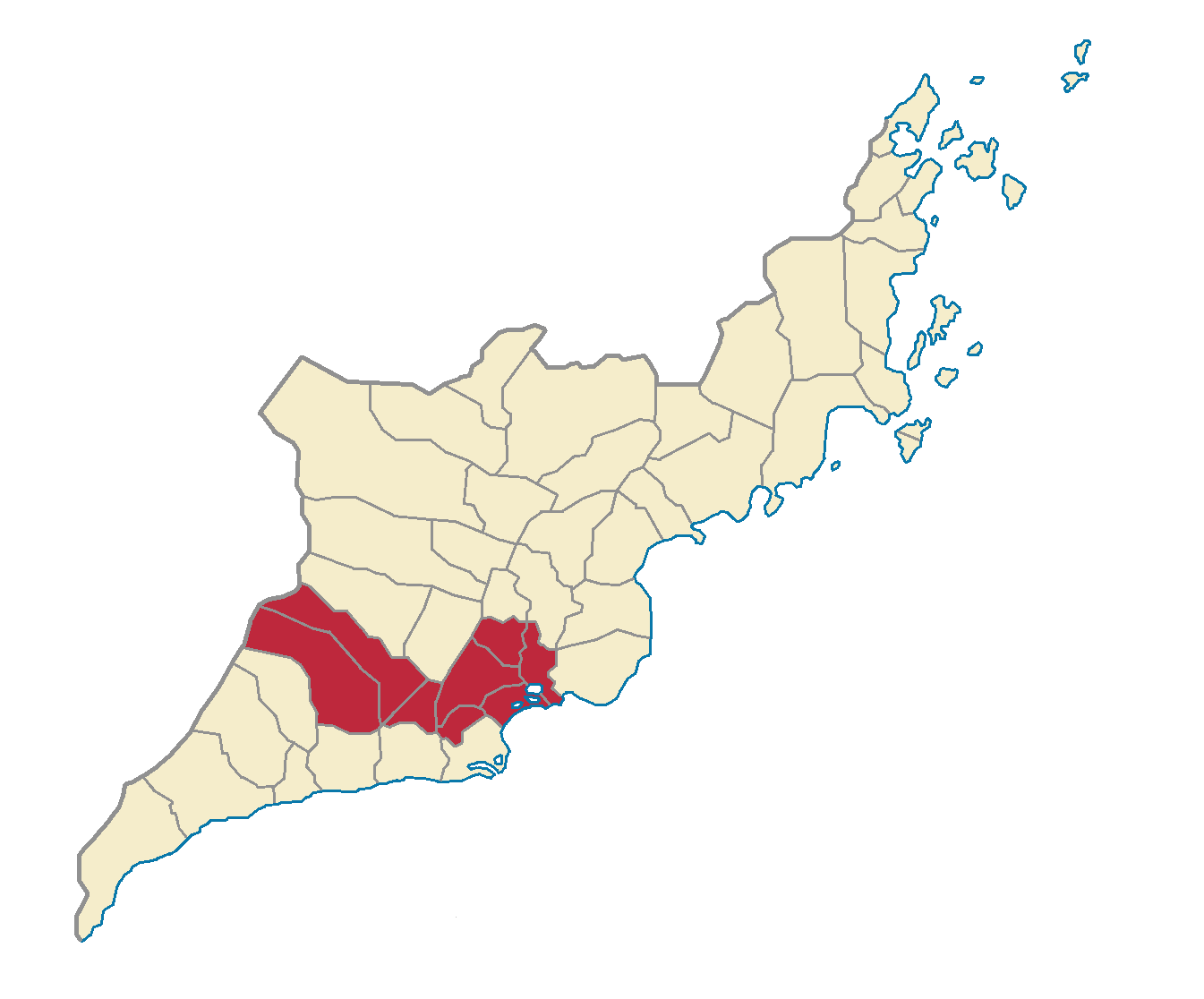
- Boundary of Iloilo's 2nd congressional district in Iloilo

- Location of Iloilo within the Philippines
- Province: Iloilo
- Region: Western Visayas
- Population: 346,189 (2020)
- Electorate: 222,230 (2022)
- Major settlements: 8 LGUs: Municipalities; Alimodian; Leganes; Leon; New Lucena; Pavia; San Miguel; Santa Barbara; Zarraga
- Area: 606.88 km²

Current constituency
- Created: 1907
- Representative: Kathryn Joyce F. Gorriceta
- Political party: Lakas
- Congressional bloc: Majority

Iloilo's 2nd congressional district is one of the five congressional districts of the Philippines in the province of Iloilo. It has been represented in the House of Representatives of the Philippines since 1916 and earlier in the Philippine Assembly from 1907 to 1916. The district consists of the municipalities of Alimodian, Leganes, Leon, New Lucena, Pavia, San Miguel, Santa Barbara and Zarraga. Until 1995, it previously included the former sub-province of Guimaras, which became a separate province in 1992. Prior to its second dissolution in 1972, it was composed of Iloilo City, the southern Iloilo municipalities of Leganes and Pavia, and the sub-province of Guimaras. It is currently represented in the 20th Congress by Kathryn Joyce Gorriceta of the Lakas-CMD.

== Representation history ==
#	Image	Member	Term of office		Legislature	Party	Electoral history	Constituent LGUs
#	Image	Member	Start	End	Legislature	Party	Electoral history	Constituent LGUs
=== Iloilo's 2nd district for the Philippine Assembly ===
District created January 9, 1907.
1		Nicolás Jalandoni	October 16, 1907	October 16, 1909	1st	Nacionalista	Elected in 1907.	1907–1916; Arevalo, Buenavista, Iloilo, Jaro
2		Carlos Ledesma	October 16, 1909	October 16, 1912	2nd	Progresista	Elected in 1909.	1907–1916; Arevalo, Buenavista, Iloilo, Jaro
3		Perfecto J. Salas	October 16, 1912	October 16, 1916	3rd	Nacionalista	Elected in 1912.	1907–1916; Arevalo, Buenavista, Iloilo, Jaro
=== Iloilo's 2nd district for the House of Representatives of the Philippine Islands ===
4		Crescenciano Lozano	October 16, 1916	June 2, 1925	4th	Nacionalista	Elected in 1916.	1916–1919; Arevalo, Buenavista, Iloilo, Jaro
4		Crescenciano Lozano	October 16, 1916	June 2, 1925	5th	Nacionalista	Re-elected in 1919.	1919–1922; Arevalo, Buenavista, Iloilo, Jaro, Jordan, La Paz
4		Crescenciano Lozano	October 16, 1916	June 2, 1925	6th	Nacionalista; Unipersonalista	Re-elected in 1922.	1922–1935; Arevalo, Buenavista, Iloilo, Jaro, Jordan, La Paz, Pavia
5		Vicente R. Ybiernas	June 2, 1925	June 5, 1928	7th	Nacionalista; Consolidado	Elected in 1925.	1922–1935; Arevalo, Buenavista, Iloilo, Jaro, Jordan, La Paz, Pavia
6		Engracio Padilla	June 5, 1928	June 2, 1931	8th	Demócrata	Elected in 1928.	1922–1935; Arevalo, Buenavista, Iloilo, Jaro, Jordan, La Paz, Pavia
(5)		Vicente R. Ybiernas	June 2, 1931	September 16, 1935	9th	Nacionalista; Consolidado	Elected in 1931.	1922–1935; Arevalo, Buenavista, Iloilo, Jaro, Jordan, La Paz, Pavia
(5)		Vicente R. Ybiernas	June 2, 1931	September 16, 1935	10th	Nacionalista; Democrático	Re-elected in 1934.	1922–1935; Arevalo, Buenavista, Iloilo, Jaro, Jordan, La Paz, Pavia
#	Image	Member	Term of office		National Assembly	Party	Electoral history	Constituent LGUs
#	Image	Member	Start	End	National Assembly	Party	Electoral history	Constituent LGUs
=== Iloilo's 2nd district for the National Assembly (Commonwealth of the Philippines) ===
7		Ruperto Montinola	September 16, 1935	February 10, 1940	1st	Nacionalista; Demócrata Pro-Independencia	Elected in 1935.	1935–1938; Arevalo, Buenavista, Iloilo, Jaro, Jordan, La Paz, Pavia
7		Ruperto Montinola	September 16, 1935	February 10, 1940	2nd	Nacionalista	Re-elected in 1938. Died.	1938–1941; Buenavista, Iloilo City, Jaro, Jordan, Pavia
8		Oscar C. Ledesma	December 10, 1940	December 30, 1941	2nd	Nacionalista	Elected in 1940 to finish Montinola's term.	1938–1941; Buenavista, Iloilo City, Jaro, Jordan, Pavia
District dissolved into the two-seat Iloilo's at-large district and the two-seat Iloilo City's at-large district for the National Assembly (Second Philippine Republic).
#	Image	Member	Term of office		Common wealth Congress	Party	Electoral history	Constituent LGUs
#	Image	Member	Start	End	Common wealth Congress	Party	Electoral history	Constituent LGUs
=== Iloilo's 2nd district for the House of Representatives of the Commonwealth of the Philippines ===
District re-created May 24, 1945.
(8)		Oscar C. Ledesma	June 9, 1945	May 25, 1946	1st	Nacionalista	Re-elected in 1941.	1945–1946; Buenavista, Iloilo City, Jordan, Leganes, Nueva Valencia, Pavia
#	Image	Member	Term of office		Congress	Party	Electoral history	Constituent LGUs
#	Image	Member	Start	End	Congress	Party	Electoral history	Constituent LGUs
=== Iloilo's 2nd district for the House of Representatives of the Philippines ===
(8)		Oscar C. Ledesma	May 29, 1946	December 30, 1949	1st	Nacionalista	Re-elected in 1946.	1946–1972; Buenavista, Iloilo City, Jordan, Leganes, Nueva Valencia, Pavia
9		Pascual P. Espinosa	December 30, 1949	December 30, 1953	2nd	Liberal	Elected in 1949.	1946–1972; Buenavista, Iloilo City, Jordan, Leganes, Nueva Valencia, Pavia
10		Rodolfo Ganzon	December 30, 1953	November 10, 1955	3rd	Nacionalista	Elected in 1953. Resigned on election as Iloilo City mayor.	1946–1972; Buenavista, Iloilo City, Jordan, Leganes, Nueva Valencia, Pavia
(9)		Pascual P. Espinosa	December 30, 1957	December 30, 1961	4th	Liberal	Elected in 1957.	1946–1972; Buenavista, Iloilo City, Jordan, Leganes, Nueva Valencia, Pavia
(10)		Rodolfo Ganzon	December 30, 1961	November 12, 1964	5th	Nacionalista	Elected in 1961. Resigned on election as senator.	1946–1972; Buenavista, Iloilo City, Jordan, Leganes, Nueva Valencia, Pavia
11		Fermin Z. Caram Jr.	December 30, 1965	September 23, 1972	6th	Nacionalista	Elected in 1965.	1946–1972; Buenavista, Iloilo City, Jordan, Leganes, Nueva Valencia, Pavia
11		Fermin Z. Caram Jr.	December 30, 1965	September 23, 1972	7th	Nacionalista	Re-elected in 1969. Removed from office after imposition of martial law.	1946–1972; Buenavista, Iloilo City, Jordan, Leganes, Nueva Valencia, Pavia
District dissolved into the sixteen-seat Region VI's at-large district for the Interim Batasang Pambansa, followed by the five-seat Iloilo's at-large district for the Regular Batasang Pambansa.
District re-created February 2, 1987.
12		Alberto J. Lopez	June 30, 1987	June 30, 1998	8th	LnB	Elected in 1987.	1987–1995; Alimodian, Buenavista, Jordan, Leganes, Leon, New Lucena, Nueva Valencia, Pavia, San Miguel, Santa Barbara, Zarraga
12		Alberto J. Lopez	June 30, 1987	June 30, 1998	9th	Lakas	Re-elected in 1992.	1987–1995; Alimodian, Buenavista, Jordan, Leganes, Leon, New Lucena, Nueva Valencia, Pavia, San Miguel, Santa Barbara, Zarraga
12		Alberto J. Lopez	June 30, 1987	June 30, 1998	10th	Lakas	Re-elected in 1995.	1995–present Alimodian, Leganes, Leon, New Lucena, Pavia, San Miguel, Santa Barbara, Zarraga
13		Augusto Syjuco Jr.	June 30, 1998	June 30, 2004	11th	LAMMP	Elected in 1998.	1995–present Alimodian, Leganes, Leon, New Lucena, Pavia, San Miguel, Santa Barbara, Zarraga
13		Augusto Syjuco Jr.	June 30, 1998	June 30, 2004	12th	Lakas	Re-elected in 2001.	1995–present Alimodian, Leganes, Leon, New Lucena, Pavia, San Miguel, Santa Barbara, Zarraga
14		Judy Syjuco	June 30, 2004	June 30, 2010	13th	Liberal	Elected in 2004.	1995–present Alimodian, Leganes, Leon, New Lucena, Pavia, San Miguel, Santa Barbara, Zarraga
14		Judy Syjuco	June 30, 2004	June 30, 2010	14th	Lakas	Re-elected in 2007.	1995–present Alimodian, Leganes, Leon, New Lucena, Pavia, San Miguel, Santa Barbara, Zarraga
(13)		Augusto Syjuco Jr.	June 30, 2010	June 30, 2013	15th	Lakas–Kampi	Elected in 2010.	1995–present Alimodian, Leganes, Leon, New Lucena, Pavia, San Miguel, Santa Barbara, Zarraga
(13)		Augusto Syjuco Jr.	June 30, 2010	June 30, 2013	15th	UNA	Elected in 2010.	1995–present Alimodian, Leganes, Leon, New Lucena, Pavia, San Miguel, Santa Barbara, Zarraga
15		Arcadio H. Gorriceta	June 30, 2013	June 30, 2019	16th	Liberal	Elected in 2013.	1995–present Alimodian, Leganes, Leon, New Lucena, Pavia, San Miguel, Santa Barbara, Zarraga
15		Arcadio H. Gorriceta	June 30, 2013	June 30, 2019	17th	Liberal	Re-elected in 2016.	1995–present Alimodian, Leganes, Leon, New Lucena, Pavia, San Miguel, Santa Barbara, Zarraga
16		Michael Gorriceta	June 30, 2019	June 30, 2025	18th	Nacionalista	Elected in 2019.	1995–present Alimodian, Leganes, Leon, New Lucena, Pavia, San Miguel, Santa Barbara, Zarraga
16		Michael Gorriceta	June 30, 2019	June 30, 2025	19th	Nacionalista	Re-elected in 2022.	1995–present Alimodian, Leganes, Leon, New Lucena, Pavia, San Miguel, Santa Barbara, Zarraga
17		Kathryn Joyce Gorriceta	June 30, 2025	Incumbent	20th	Lakas	Elected in 2025.	1995–present Alimodian, Leganes, Leon, New Lucena, Pavia, San Miguel, Santa Barbara, Zarraga

== Election results ==
=== 2019 ===
2019 Philippine House of Representatives elections
Party	Candidate	Votes	%
Nacionalista	Michael Gorriceta	106,121	71.50
NUP	Dennis Superficial	41,072	27.67
Independent	Mark John Velasco	1,226	8.26
Total votes		148,419	100.00

=== 2016 ===
2016 Philippine House of Representatives elections
Party	Candidate	Votes	%
Liberal	Arcadio Gorriceta	99,957	64.25
UNA	June Mondejar	41,585	26.73
Invalid or blank votes		14,032	9.01
Total votes		155,574	100.00

=== 2013 ===
2013 Philippine House of Representatives elections
Party	Candidate	Votes	%
Liberal	Arcadio Gorriceta	44,310	41.60
Independent	Salvador Cabaluna III	30,773	28.89
UNA	Augusto Syjuco Jr.	23,404	21.97
Margin of victory		13,537	12.71
Invalid or blank votes		8,033	7.54
Total votes		106,520	100.00
Liberal gain from UNA			

=== 2010 ===
2010 Philippine House of Representatives elections
Party	Candidate	Votes	%
Lakas–Kampi	Augusto Syjuco Jr.	79,843	63.11
NPC	Ramon Arenas Jr.	43,654	34.50
Independent	Diopito Gonzales	3,027	2.39
Valid ballots		126,524	91.63
Invalid or blank votes		11,558	8.37
Total votes		138,082	100.00
Lakas–Kampi hold			

== See also ==
- Legislative districts of Iloilo
