= Alimodian =

Municipality in Iloilo, Philippines

- Municipality
- Municipality of Alimodian
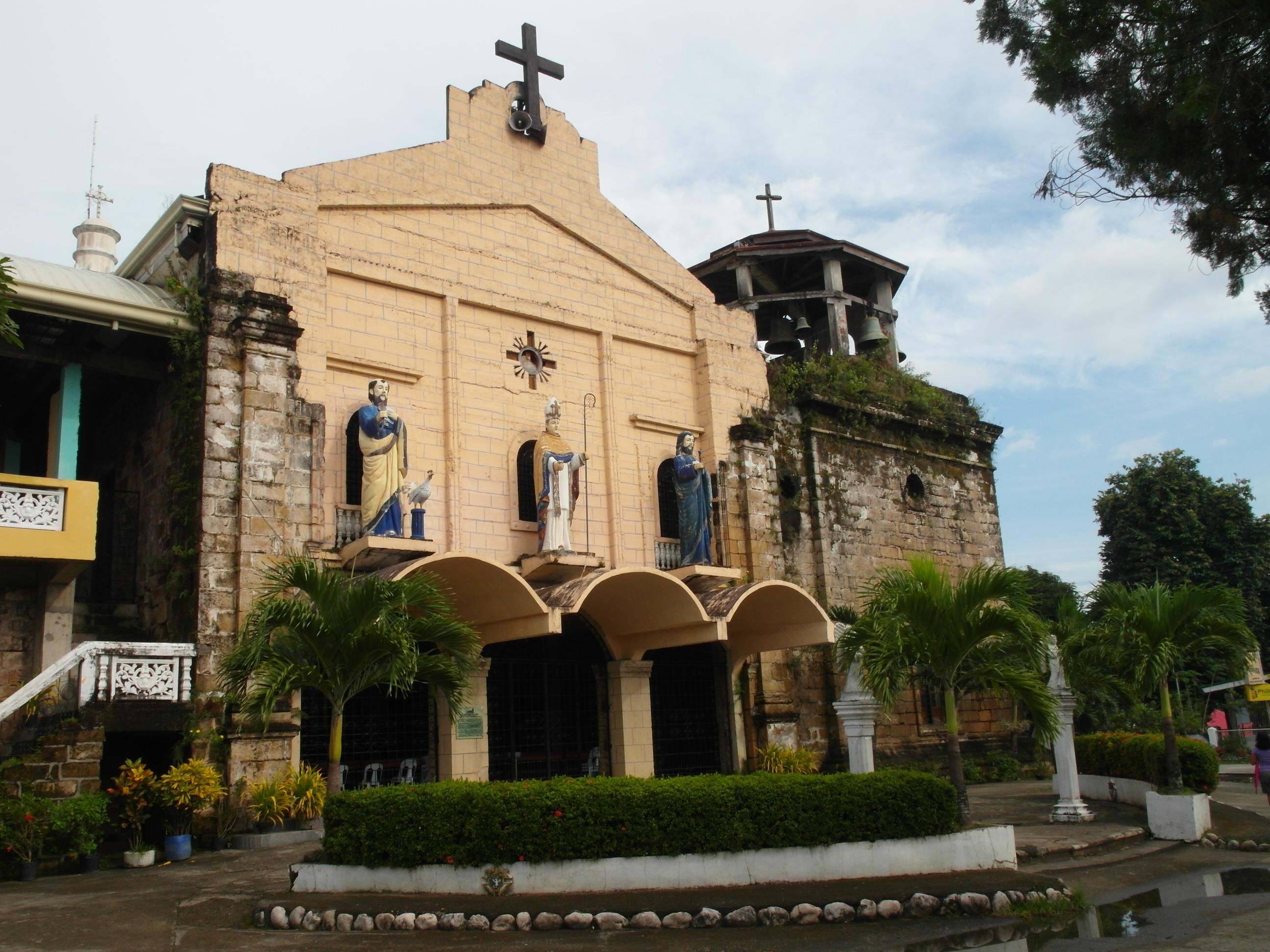
- Alimodian Roman Catholic Church

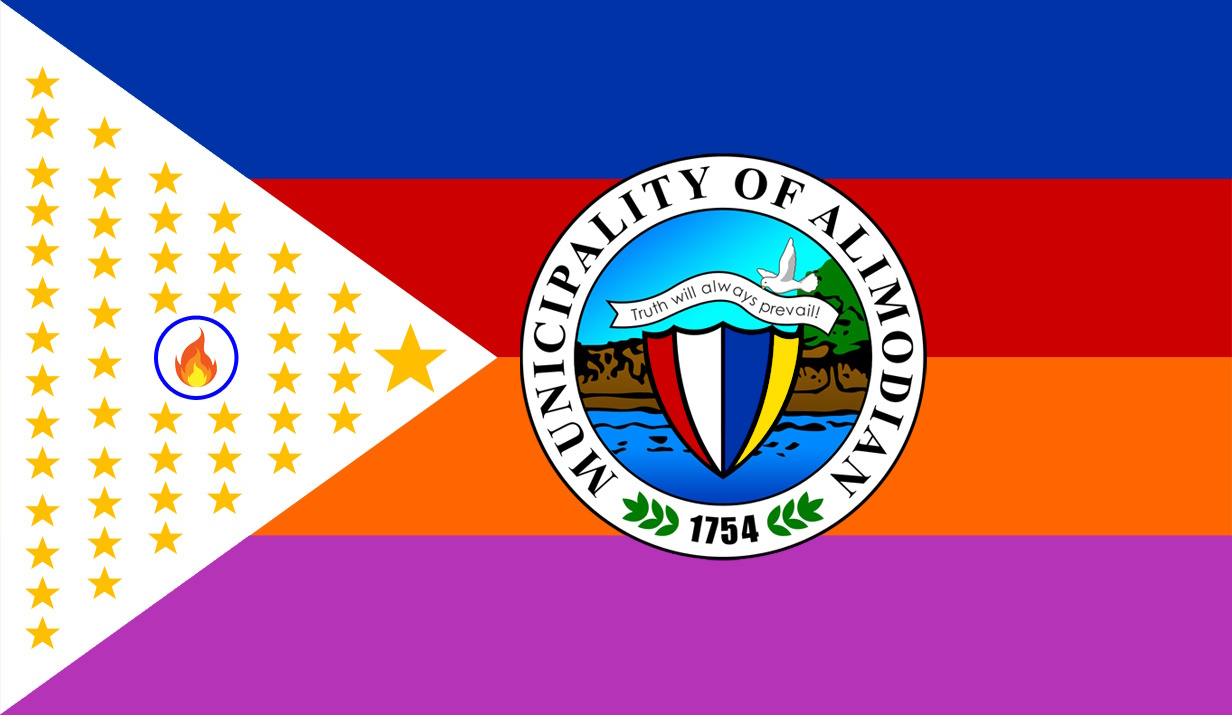
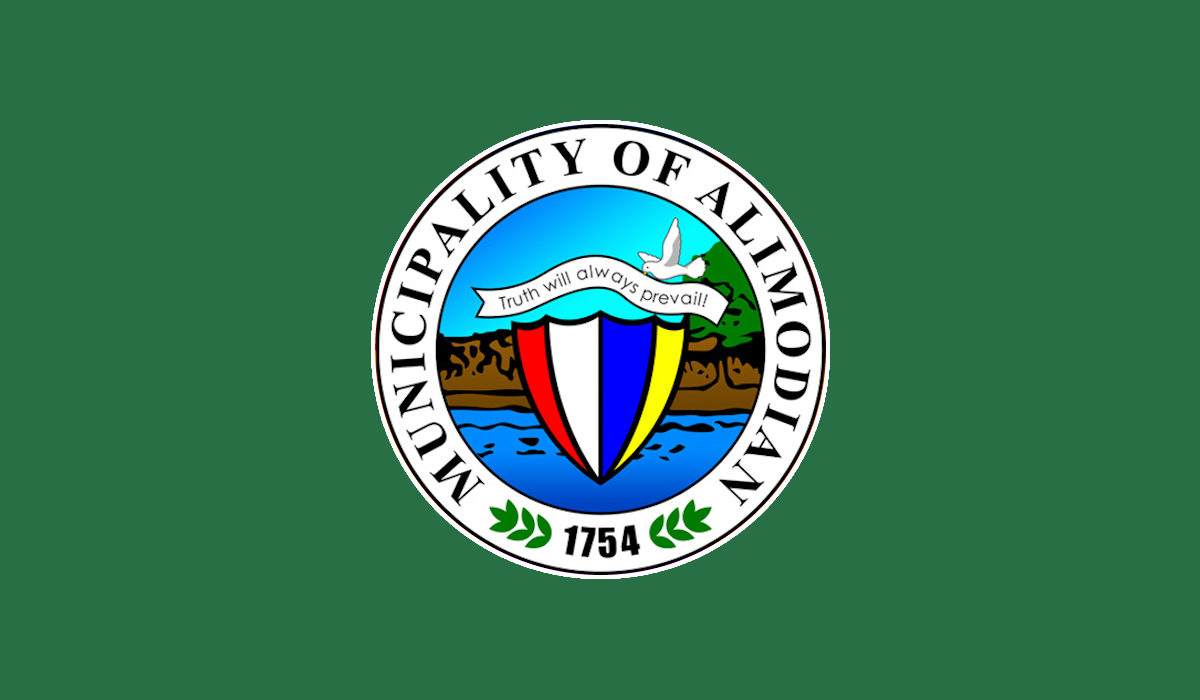
- Flag Flag (government)
- Nicknames: Banana Capital of Western Visayas; Strawberry Capital of Iloilo
- Motto: Truth Always Prevails
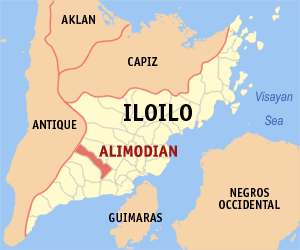
- Map of Iloilo with Alimodian highlighted
- Interactive map of Alimodian
- Location within the Philippines
- Coordinates: 10°49′10″N 122°25′56″E
- Country: Philippines
- Region: Western Visayas
- Province: Iloilo
- District: 2nd district
- Founded: 1754
- Barangays: 51 (see Barangays)

Government
  - Type: Sangguniang Bayan
  - Mayor: Ian Kenneth A. Alfeche (PFP)
  - Vice Mayor: Gefree C. Alonsabe (PFP)
  - Representative: Kathryn Joyce F. Gorriceta (Lakas)
  - Municipal Council: Members: John Darwin A. Almacen (Nacionalista); Larriette A. Altubar (Lakas); Nelson P. Tagabi (Nacionalista); Marilyn A. Aquidado (PFP); Noralyn A. Cabatbat (Nacionalista); Jessie M. Cablas (PFP); Eden Faye A. Almenoral (PFP); Relen A. Cabangal (Lakas); Sebastian Salcedo ^{‡}; Demie Bernard Angelitud ^{◌}; ‡ ex officio ABC president; ◌ ex officio SK chairman
  - Electorate: 25,616 voters (2025)

Area
  - Total: 144.82 km^{2} (55.92 sq mi)
- Elevation: 90 m (300 ft)
- Highest elevation: 291 m (955 ft)
- Lowest elevation: 31 m (102 ft)

Population (2024 census)
  - Total: 39,814
  - Density: 274.92/km^{2} (712.04/sq mi)
  - Households: 9,276

Economy
  - Income class: 2nd municipal income class
  - Poverty incidence: 16.61% (2023)
  - Revenue: ₱ 193.8 million (2024)
  - Assets: ₱ 417.5 million (2024)
  - Expenditure: ₱ 67.54 million (2024)
  - Liabilities: ₱ 117.3 million (2024)

Service provider
  - Electricity: Iloilo 1 Electric Cooperative (ILECO 1)
- Time zone: UTC+8 (PST)
- ZIP code: 5028
- PSGC: 063002000
- IDD : area code: +63 (0)33
- Native languages: Karay-a; Hiligaynon; Tagalog
- Website: www.alimodian.gov.ph

Alimodian, officially the Municipality of Alimodian (Kinaray-a: Banwa kang Alimodian; Hiligaynon: Banwa sang Alimodian; Tagalog: Bayan ng Alimodian), is a municipality in the province of Iloilo, Philippines. According to the 2024 census, it has a population of 39,814 people.

Known as the Banana Capital of Western Visayas, it produces not only the most harvest in Western Visayas, but also the sweetest banana in the region. The town also boasts of producing maize, mangoes, root crops, sweet potatoes, legumes, bamboo, coconuts, as well as high yielding crops such as carrots, cauliflower, broccoli and strawberries, thus widely regarded as the Strawberry Capital of Iloilo, as it produces substantial amount of strawberries in its strawberry farms.

== Etymology ==
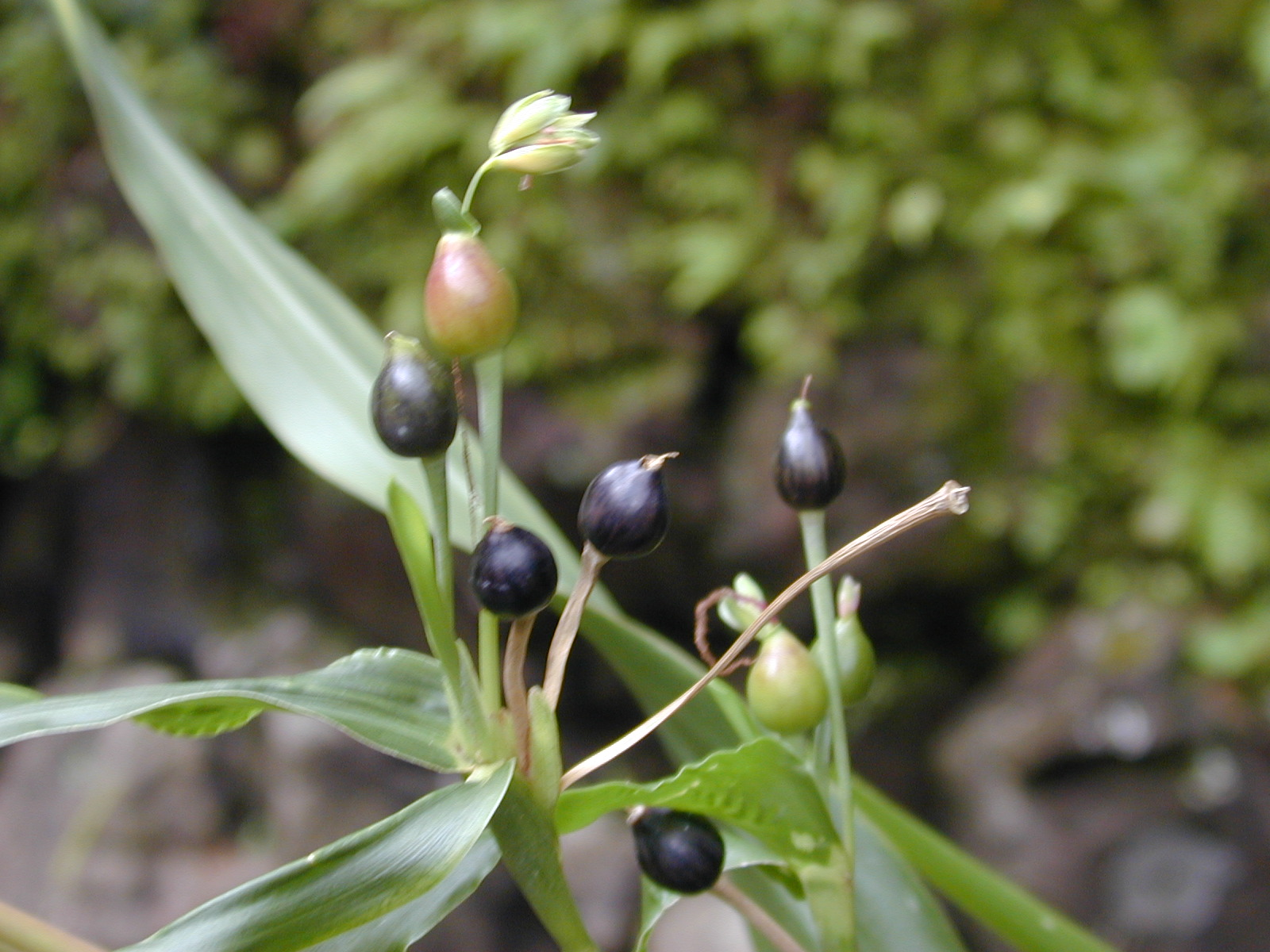
The name of the town was named after this plant alimodia or alimodias, the old Visayan name for Coix lachryma-jobi.

The name of the town is derived from alimodia or alimodias, the old Visayan name for Job's tears (Coix lachryma-jobi), a grain-bearing plant of the grass family ubiquitous in the town according to the recent discovered research through the town's old Spanish manuscript and documents. The plant owes its name to the shape of its hard-shelled pseudocarps which are made by some into necklaces or rosary beads.

== History ==
=== Spanish colonial period ===
Alimodian was formerly an arrabal of the town of Ogtong. The town was founded in 1754 by Capitan Agustin Magtanong. On August 20, 1756, Alimodian was officially separated from Ogtong.

The original church of Alimodian was first constructed in 1754. It was agreed that the site of the church would be on the place where the rope that pulled the tablon (a huge timber) would break. The tablon came from the shore of Ogtong (now Oton) and it was pulled by a pair of carabaos. Thus the site was decided and the people built a chapel of bamboos, cogon and logs. The plan to build a permanent church made of bricks and rocks plastered with lime was initiated in 1780 by then gobernadorcillo Marcos Gregorio and incumbent priest Fr. Francisco Monasterio and was moved on the northwest of the church's cemetery on Nichols St. It was completed in 1784 but was destroyed by an earthquake in 1787.

The cornerstone of a permanent stone was laid on December 5, 1859, through the efforts of parish priest Fr. Florencio Martin and gobernadorcillo Don Timoteo Amarra. It was well attended by Spanish dignitaries from Manila, Cebu and Iloilo. It was completed in 1864 and was formally opened to public on December 22, 1864, amidst a colorful ceremonies.

The first permanent municipal hall was constructed in 1872 more than a century after its foundation since the first municipal building was built. It was completed in 1873 at a cost of 300 pesos during the incumbency of Capitan Marcelo Tolentino y Alger.

==== Calamities during the 19th century ====
The last half of the 19th century has been infamously remembered as one of the most disastrous and disturbing period in the annals of Alimodian.

It started in December 1851 when it rained tremendously for over a week with some gusty winds. The heavy downpour causes deluge on the rivers uprooting huge trees carrying them from the banks of the river to the plains. No official record of casualties existed. Another typhoon happened in May 1866 struck several towns including Alimodian. During its full strength a lightning struck the giant cross on the belfry of the new church toppling it to the ground. A strong earthquake jolted the church on June 29, 1869, a feast day of St. Peter and St. Paul and many pious devotees who flocked to the church at 7 am mass suffered broken limbs during a commotion. A big fire took place at around 1 pm April 25, 1877 and at least 17 houses made of bamboo and other light materials reduced to ashes while an old woman caught fire and left several families homeless. July and August 1877 were months ravaged with typhoon and severe flooding causing many trees to be uprooted. The heavy downpour in those months caused nature to exhaust its supply that from September 1877 to May 1878 not a single drop fell from heaven. There is a severe drought and the town suffered almost 10 months of arid climate people are parched and feel the searing heat pierced their bodies and crops were devastated and no single harvest took place in 1878 because it was a toxic year of famine, disease and death. On March 1, 1878, at eight in the evening, a huge fire reduced to ashes some 180 houses in Balud and Dawis (now Liboon and Rodriguez Streets respectively) just near the town plaza. Many got sick and perished in the dreaded months of August to December 1878 due to low resistance brought by deficient food intake. Almost 3,000 elderly people and children died on this tragic period and anemia and gastroenteritis were the leading cause of their early deaths. Another pestilence happen in August 1882 and according to the records some 900 people perished. A strong earthquake shook the town on February 2, 1887, which caused the stone image of St. Augustine which sits on top of the main door of the church to fell.

=== American colonial period ===
The turn of the century, with the coming of the Americans, didn't augur well for the town. On September 8, 1900, tragedy struck with the outbreak of cholera. The epidemic according to the official records took the lives of at least 700 people, which does not include those in the remote villages.

In 1902 Wilford Nichols, an American teacher arrived in Alimodian to teach the English language. Those who were already proficient in Spanish were required to attend school first so they could in turn teach other citizens how to read and write in English. The first principal was Justo Puga, and the first teachers were Felicidad Alingasa Santa Cruz, Venancia Santa Cruz Edurese and Concepcion Alfante Akol.

Alimodian together with San Miguel became an arrabales of the town of Leon under Commonwealth Act No. 719 signed on April 4, 1903, which takes effect in January 1904. Executive Order No. 45 signed by Governor General Francis Burton Harrison separated Alimodian from Leon effective December 31, 1918. By the first day of 1919 Alimodian elevated its status from just an arrabal of Leon to a fully independent municipality.

=== Japanese occupation and World War II ===
The Japanese Imperial Army first passed by Alimodian on April 19, 1942, from Maasin aboard their trucks and bicycles. They left the town peacefully and without any incidents since there were no combat forces in the area as they camped out in the mountains like in Cabacanan long before the Japanese military arrived, except for the intelligence operatives of the G-2 section and other units who were in the town center to monitor covertly the movements of the invading enemy forces. The operatives included Sgt. Marcelo Tolentino, Conrado Norada, former Iloilo governor, and Sgt. Alfredo Galon. It was learned based on the intelligence reports gathered by the military that there were Japanese sympathizers among the evacuees at the convent of Fr. Mariano Perez, who was the parish priest at the time Sgt. Galon was planted as a houseboy at the convent. The information Fr. Mariano Perez gathered was relayed to Maj. Rafael Almacen, chief of the G-2 Intelligence Section operative during the war. In May 1942, an order was received from Major Rafael Almacen to round up Filipino soldiers who escaped being a prisoner of war and convince them to join Panay Free Forces organized in the mountains of Lambunao by Panay movement led by Col. Macario Peralta, Lt. Col. Leopoldo Relunia, Maj. Jose Alvior, Lt. Col. Julian Chavez and other responsible officers of the disbanded USAFFE. Refusal to join meant their firearms would be confiscated. The designated town officer, First Lt. Marcelo Tolentino organized the Alimodian chapter of the movement in June 1942. This was a sub-unit of the First Iloilo Sector consisting of southern towns of Iloilo. Major Almacen was assigned as sector commander by Col. Peralta. During the first few months of guerilla warfare, Sitio Taban became the center of activities of guerillas, Japanese spies and civilians. After the Japanese eventually landed in Iloilo, the town's public market was transferred to Sitio Taban.

==== Taban massacre ====
This took place in the early morning of August 17, 1942.

It was a fine busy Tuesday morning and people were busy trading and buying and selling farm produce and people of all ages and genders crowded the marketplace. All of a sudden the Japanese appeared in a flash. The first impulse is to escape but it was too late for most of the people to escape. The preconceived plan of getting all the able bodied men from the crowd was carried out, Japanese forces seized them and tied their hands. About 50 men were captured after all the rest successfully eluded the Japanese while those who were left in the scene were women. Bayonets and sabers were immediately put into action after lining up the captured 50 men who were securely tied up. One by one, the captives were made to stand against the trunk of a coconut tree. Immediately, each one of them was subjected to bayonet thrusts and later beheaded with sabers. The massacre was completed and the severed heads of the victims were left scattered around to be eaten by the dogs after the murderers had gone. The Japanese soldiers were ruthless and committed many atrocities during the Second World War.

The brave Filipinos had to fight back. On May 7, 1942, the first ambush on the Japanese Imperial forces took place in Barangay Balabago led by Col. Macario Peralta, commander of the Panay Guerilla and Free Panay Movement. Meanwhile, Col. Julian Chavez, the 63rd Regiment Commander established his command post in Barangay Dalid in preparation for the landing of the American forces in Parara Sur, Tigbauan. The 63rd Regiment Hospital headed by Capt. Alejandro Nery Cruz, MD was housed in the old central school building now the site of Alimodian Water District and Municipal Library. US navy pilot, Ensign William G. Shackleford was safely brought in Alimodian after his forced landing in Barrio Bangkal, Tigbauan, Iloilo due to engine trouble during an air raid of Iloilo City on September 13–14 and 24, 1944. William Shackleford was saved by the guerillas and able to dismantle six machine guns and hundreds of ammunitions. William Shackleford also burned his plane by firing a tracer bullet before the Japanese arrived. Shackleford was brought by Lt. Marcelo Tolentino to the command post in Inocencio Street. Shackleford was welcomed cheerfully and treated like a hero and offered a sumptuous meal by the Segovia sisters, Luisa, Carolina and Maria who were evacuees from the city and signed autographs in emergency notes by those present. In turn Shackleford distributed chewing gums and candies.

=== Post-war reconstruction and developments ===
Alimodian was a no man's land after the war. Houses were burned and demolished. When the people returned to the town after the war, they had to live in makeshift houses made of bamboo and nipa for their shelter. The American government has its fair share of damages during the war. The American government paid the people in the form of reparations. In addition, guerilla notes issued during the war were also redeemed. Mayor Felix Altura who was the town's mayor before and after the war came back to office in March 1945 to have a responsive government immediately act on the people's needs. The military government appointed Simeon Cañonero as municipal mayor on May 15, 1946. The vice mayor was Anacleto Amparo and the councilors were Gelacio Allones, Wenceslao Anino, Teodosia Amarra, Pablo Albeza and Clara Alegrado. Mayor Simeon Cañonero is the longest-serving mayor of the town who served for two years as a military-appointed mayor after the war and was elected for three terms of four years. Many buildings and structures in the town were destroyed and ruined during the Japanese occupation mostly from Japanese attacks, arson attempts of retaliating Filipino forces and series of lootings by deprived citizens and evacuees. During the term of Mayor Cañonero, roads, bridges, schools and other infrastructure ruined by the war were reconstructed and made completely functional. School buildings in the town and barrios were rebuilt funded from the Philippine War Damage Claim. Rehabilitation of school buildings were given importance and priority due to an increase of student enrollment after the war. Alimodian High School was founded in 1947 paving the way for secondary education for the young citizens of the town.

A street lighting system was first introduced in town after the war provided by Alimodian Electric Light Service, an electric plant owned by the prominent family of Mrs. Natalia Amparado. On November 9, 1966, a boundary dispute between Alimodian and Cabatuan was resolved. The popular Holy Week pilgrimage site Agony Hill was blessed and inaugurated at 3:30 PM on May 3, 1967, by then Jaro Auxiliary Bishop, most Reverend Jaime L. Sin, D.D. This project was initiated and completed by Reverend Father Nicolas Caberoy. Rural Bank of Alimodian Inc. was established in 1973 during the incumbency of Mayor Miguel Anas. It was inaugurated on December 31, 1974. ALEOSAN (initials of Alimodian, Leon and San Miguel) were the towns serviced by the hospital. The initials would be also the name of a town in Mindanao where the majority of Hiligaynon settlers and their descendants came from. The hospital was founded in April 1968 through Republic Act No. 4854 authored by late Congressman Ramon Tabiana. The town was first energized on May 5, 1975, by Iloilo Electric Cooperative I with its main office in Tigbauan, Iloilo. Three hundred fifty households in the town proper and forty-two households in the barangays of Balabago, Bancal, Buhay and Lanot were the first recipients of the electrification project. Aganan River flood control was also constructed.

Five policemen, patrolmen Silvio Amaguin, Bernardo Alinday, Agustin Alitre, Romeo Alipat and Florencio Aligor, were killed on the spot by an ambush of the anti-government forces while on their way home after performing their mission in Barangay Tarug on the tragic day of August 20, 1978.

== Geography ==
Alimodian is 39 kilometres (24 mi) from Iloilo City. The rugged terrains of the seven cities in the northwestern hinterlands or upland communities of the town is part of the Bucari mountain ranges which lies mostly in the town of Leon. Bato Dungok of Mount Agua Colonia in the seven cities is the highest point in Alimodian. The main tributary which passes through and serves several barangays is Aganan river which is the longest and only river in the town.

Alimodian has a total land area of 14,482 hectares (35,790 acres), making up 2.89% of the provincial land area of Iloilo. It has some rugged terrains as well as ample flat lands for agriculture. The Bucari mountain range which serves as a natural boundary with other towns is located in the northern hinterlands of the town.

Alimodian is bounded on the north by the municipality of Maasin, northeast by the municipality of Cabatuan while to the south is the town of Leon. Southeast of the town is the town of San Miguel while to its west is the Municipality of San Remigio in the province of Antique.

=== Land use ===
Alimodian is still mainly an agricultural town. For the most part, since the soil is fertile agriculture and farming use vast tracts of land in the town. Other portion of the land is used for residential and commercial purposes. Below is the data of land use for agricultural based resources.

1. Rice, Irrigated – 300 hectares
2. Rice, Rain feed – 1,400 hectares
3. Corn – 700 hectares
4. Vegetables / Fruits – 150 hectares
5. Fruit Trees – 30 hectares
6. Root Crops – 35 hectares
7. Mango – 45 hectares
8. Legumes – 250 hectares
9. Bamboo – 80 hectares
10. High Value Crops – 75 hectares
11. Coconut – 120 hectares

=== Climate ===
Climate data for Alimodian, Iloilo, Philippines — NOAA Station Id: PH98637
Month	Jan	Feb	Mar	Apr	May	Jun	Jul	Aug	Sep	Oct	Nov	Dec	Year
Mean daily maximum °C (°F)	29.7 (85.5)	30.2 (86.4)	31.7 (89.1)	33.1 (91.6)	33.1 (91.6)	31.6 (88.9)	30.7 (87.3)	30.4 (86.7)	30.8 (87.4)	31.1 (88.0)	30.9 (87.6)	30.2 (86.4)	31.12 (88.02)
Daily mean °C (°F)	26.1 (79.0)	26.5 (79.7)	27.6 (81.7)	28.9 (84.0)	29.1 (84.4)	28.1 (82.6)	27.6 (81.7)	27.5 (81.5)	27.6 (81.7)	27.7 (81.9)	27.5 (81.5)	26.8 (80.2)	27.59 (81.66)
Mean daily minimum °C (°F)	22.7 (72.9)	22.7 (72.9)	23.5 (74.3)	24.6 (76.3)	25.1 (77.2)	24.7 (76.5)	24.4 (75.9)	24.5 (76.1)	24.4 (75.9)	24.2 (75.6)	24.0 (75.2)	23.4 (74.1)	24.02 (75.24)
Average rainfall mm (inches)	39.9 (1.57)	19.1 (0.75)	27.1 (1.07)	47.7 (1.88)	117.9 (4.64)	255.2 (10.05)	313.2 (12.33)	363.7 (14.32)	266.8 (10.50)	264.1 (10.40)	174.8 (6.88)	64.2 (2.53)	1,953.7 (76.92)
Average relative humidity (%)	82	80	75	73	77	82	85	85	85	84	84	83	81.25
Source: "Climate (Average Weather) Data". Climate-Charts.com. Archived from the original on May 11, 2011.

Alimodian has three pronounced seasons: summer or hot dry season from March – May, rainy season from June – November and cold dry months from December – February.

=== Barangays ===
Alimodian is politically subdivided into 51 barangays. Each barangay consists of puroks and some have sitios.

These barangays are further subdivided into 8 administrative districts.

- Abang-abang
- Agsing
- Atabay
- Ba-ong
- Baguingin-Lanot
- Bagsakan
- Bagumbayan-Ilajas
- Balabago
- Ban-ag
- Bancal
- Binalud
- Bugang
- Buhay
- Bulod
- Cabacanan Proper
- Cabacanan Rizal
- Cagay
- Coline
- Coline-Dalag
- Cunsad
- Cuyad
- Dalid
- Dao
- Gines
- Ginomoy
- Ingwan
- Laylayan
- Lico
- Luan-luan
- Malamhay
- Malamboy-Bondolan
- Mambawi
- Manasa
- Manduyog
- Pajo
- Pianda-an Norte
- Pianda-an Sur
- Poblacion
- Punong
- Quinaspan
- Sinamay
- Sulong
- Taban-Manguining
- Tabug
- Tarug
- Tugaslon
- Ubodan
- Ugbo
- Ulay-Bugang
- Ulay-Hinablan
- Umingan

== Demographics ==
Population census of Alimodian
Year	Pop.	±% p.a.
1903	7,274	—
1939	13,638	+1.76%
1948	16,886	+2.40%
1960	18,121	+0.59%
1970	19,751	+0.86%
1975	21,886	+2.08%
1980	22,906	+0.91%
1990	27,203	+1.73%
1995	29,179	+1.32%
2000	31,494	+1.65%
2007	34,035	+1.08%
2010	37,484	+3.58%
2015	38,408	+0.46%
2020	39,722	+0.71%
2024	39,814	+0.06%
Source: Philippine Statistics Authority

In the 2024 census, the population of Alimodian was 39,814 people, with a density of 270 inhabitants per square kilometre or 700 inhabitants per square mile. It is the 22nd most populous municipality in the province of Iloilo.

=== Languages ===
The citizens of Alimodian are called Alimodiananon. The main dialects of the town are Kinaray-a and Hiligaynon. English and Tagalog are also widely spoken.

=== Religion ===
The dominant religion is Roman Catholicism.

== Economy ==
Poverty incidence of Alimodian (%)

Source: Philippine Statistics Authority

Alimodian is a third class municipality in the province of Iloilo. It has an annual income of P57,574,977 pesos making it the 20th largest economy in the province. The town and its people have access to excellent healthcare, banking, communication, transportation and commercial services. Below is the socio-economic support services provided for the citizens and people in the municipality.

Socio-economic support services

- 95 kilometers of national, municipal and barangay roads
- Domestic water supplied by ILECO I in the Poblacion and adjacent barangays by Alimodian Water District
- Electric power supplied by ILECO I in the Poblacion and all of the 50 barangays 100% energized
- Communication facilities operated by PLDT, wireless communication services such as Globe and Smart, Philippine National Police and Icom Handheld Transceiver
- Internet broadband and wireless services provided by PLDT, Globe and Smart Wireless Networks
- Direct broadcast satellite providers by Cignal Digital TV, Dream Satellite TV, G Sat and Sky Direct
- Educational facilities
  - a. 8 primary and 20 elementary schools with 8 kindergarten classes
  - b. 4 secondary schools
  - c. 47 day care centers
- Health and social services facilities
  - a. ALEOSAN District Hospital
  - b. 1 municipal health center
  - c. 8 health stations
  - d. 47 Day Care Centers
  - e. Community based rehabilitation services for persons with disabilities (CBRS)

Multi-purpose cooperatives

- Kooperatiba Sang Alimodian
- ALGEMCO (Alimodian Government Employees Multi-Purpose Cooperative)
- Alimodian Bamboo Craft Multi-Purpose Cooperative
- Alimodian Dairy Farmers Multi-Purpose Cooperative
- Alimodian Veterans Multi-Purpose Cooperative
- ANCHS Teachers & Employees Multi-Purpose Cooperative
- Baguingin-Lanot Multi-Purpose Cooperative
- Buhay Multi-Purpose Cooperative
- Binalud Multi-Purpose Cooperative
- Ban-ag Multi-Purpose Cooperative
- Bancal Multi-Purpose Cooperative
- Bagsakan Multi-Purpose Cooperative
- Bagumbayan – Ilajas Multi-Purpose Cooperative
- Bulod Multi-Purpose Cooperative
- Coline-Dalag Multi-Purpose Cooperative
- Coline Kaisahan Multi-Purpose Cooperative
- Dao Sikat Multi-Purpose Cooperative
- Kooperatiba Kang Pianda-an
- Manguining Multi-Purpose Cooperative
- Manduyog Multi-Purpose Cooperative
- Mambawi Multi-Purpose Cooperative
- Pilucca Multi-Purpose Cooperative
- Rosario Hills Home Owners Multi-Purpose Cooperative
- Sinamay Multi-Purpose Cooperative
- St. Thomas Van Owners and Drivers Multi-Purpose Cooperative
- Sulong Multi-Purpose Cooperative
- Ubodan Multi-Purpose Cooperative
- Ulay Hinablan Multi-Purpose Cooperative

=== Banking ===
Banking services and financial assistance for the residents of Alimodian began with the inauguration of the Rural Bank of Alimodian on December 31, 1974, with accounts officially opened on February 6, 1975. The bank ceased operations in 2021 and its banking office was replaced by Queen City Development Bank. Alimodian Kilusang Bayan for Credits and Kooperatiba sang Alimodian were also established to provide support to the local population. Today, there are at least 28 multi-purpose cooperatives serving various barangays, communities and associations in the town.

=== Trade ===
The Alimodian Public Market has various stores that sell different products and other dry goods, some food stalls and other services like barbershop, internet cafe and beauty salons. Market days in the town take place every Tuesday and Friday but some stalls and stores are open every day such as vegetables, fruits, other dry goods, medicines and hardware.

== Government ==
=== Elected officials ===
Current local government officials whose tenure of office will end by June 30, 2028.

Members of the Alimodian Municipal Council (2025–2028)
Position	Name
Chief Executive of the Municipality (Mayor)	Ian Kenneth A. Alfeche
Presiding Officer of the Municipal Council (Vice Mayor)	Gefree C. Alonsabe
Members of the Municipal Council	John Darwin A. Almacen
Members of the Municipal Council	Larriette A. Altubar
Members of the Municipal Council	Nelson P. Tagabi
Members of the Municipal Council	Marilyn A. Aquidado
Members of the Municipal Council	Noralyn A. Cabatbat
Members of the Municipal Council	Jessie M. Cablas
Members of the Municipal Council	Eden Faye A. Amendral
Members of the Municipal Council	Relen A. Cabangal

=== Seal ===
The Official Seal of the Municipality of Alimodian was declared as an official symbol of the town of Alimodian on July 29, 1973, during the Municipal Council.

=== List of former chief executives ===
At the turn of the century during the early years of the American civil government, Alimodian was an arrabal of the municipality of Leon. These are the elected officials during that time.

1904 - 1906 - Evaristo Capalla
1906 - 1907 - Gelacio Tabiana
1908 - 1909 - Nicolas Cambronero
1910 - 1911 - Raymundo Canillas
1912 - 1915 - Justo Puga
1916 - 1918 - Gregorio Alvior

On January 1, 1919, the Municipality of Alimodian separated from Leon becoming an independent municipality through Executive Order No. 45 signed by then American governor-general Francis Burton Harrison. These were elected municipal presidents (equivalent to municipal town mayor today) during that time.

1919 - 1920 - Gregorio Alvior
1920 - 1922 - Ramon Liboon
1922 - 1925 - Gregorio Alvior
1925 - 1928 - Tomas Algallar
1928 - 1931 - Gelacio Allones
1931 - 1934 - Ruperto Rodriguez
1934 - 1937 - Jose G. Alvior

In 1937, the name Municipal President was changed to Alcalde.

1937 - 1940 - Cipriano Cabaluna
1940 - 1945 - Felix G. Altura

The town is under the Japanese Imperial Puppet Government from 1942 - 1945 and the present name of town mayor began during this period.

1942 - 1945 - Anacleto Amparo (Puppet Government Mayor)
1942 - 1945 - Felix Altura (Civil Resistance Government Mayor)

After World War II appointed officials were designated to assess the damage of the war for rebuilding efforts.

1946 - Simeon Cañonero (Appointed)

1947 - 1959 - Simeon Cañonero
1960 - 1963 - David Alfeche
1964 - 1967 - Simeon Salarda
1968 - 1974 - Miguel Anas
1974 - 1980 - Antonio Anibigno*
1980 - 1987 - Salvador Altura
1987 - 1998 - Juanito Alipao
1998 - 2001 - Bernardo Ambut
2001 - 2010 - Marylou Alipao
2010 - 2013 - Juanito Alipao
2013 - 2022 - Geefre "Calay" Alonsabe
2022 - 2025 - Ian Kenneth Alfeche
2025 - Present - Ian Kenneth Alfeche (re-elected)

- Vice Mayor Antonio Anibigno succeeded the mayoralty post after the death of the incumbent mayor Miguel Anas who was the first mayor of the town who died while in office.

== Culture ==
The annual patronal town fiesta is celebrated every 22 September in honor of Saint Thomas of Villanova. There are several week long activities and shows prior to the highlights of the celebration and a feria is put up to entertain and celebrate with the people. Since the town is a deeply Catholic municipality, religious practices and customs are being observed during Lent, the Flores de Mayo and Christmas. Pilgrims flock to the popular Agony Hill to make the Way of the Cross during Easter Holy Week.

There are many activities, programs and food festivals around the town plaza during Christmas including Christmas tree and lantern competition.

== Tourism ==
Alimodian is a small picturesque farming town of around 40,000 people. It is known for its rugged, cloud-capped mountains, fertile lands, hills, and a tidy environment that makes it a distinctive central Iloilo town. Its meaningful past contributed to shape the course of history not only in the province of Iloilo but also the entire Western Visayas region.

Alimodian Public Plaza
The charming plaza once won first place in the National Beautification Contest.

Agony Hill
Pilgrims, devotees and tourists from all over Western Visayas region flock to this majestic hill during the Holy Week to reflect and make the Way of the Cross.

St. Thomas Of Villanova Parish Church and Convent
This Augustinian church was first built in 1859 and completed in 1864. It was opened to public on December 22, 1864. It was partially destroyed during the strong 1948 Lady Kay-Kay earthquake causing its biggest bell to fall on the ground. The church underwent major restoration and renovation during the late 1990s and early 2000s. The beautiful convent with a large statue of Our Lady of Lourdes was built and completed in early 2000s.

Alimodian Municipal Building
The first permanent municipal hall was constructed in 1872 only to be replaced with a newer building in the 1960s. The modern municipal building today was completed in 2016.

Seven Cities
It composed the seven clustered barangays or villages located in the upland hinterlands of the town of Alimodian and is linked to the Bucari mountain range of the town of Leon. It is composed of the barangays Cabacanan (Proper and Rizal), Dao, Lico, Manasa, Tabug and Umingan. It is called the "Little Baguio of Iloilo" because of its cool climate. They produce high yielding crops such as cauliflower, carrots, broccoli and even strawberries. It is also known for its lush vegetation, thick jungle forest, diverse wildlife and plants such as wild berries and fruits, caves, steep cliffs and boulders, waterfalls and rice terraces.

== Sports ==
Basketball is a common sport played by men of all ages and watched by the people during the summer basketball league sponsored and supported by the local government. Other sports being played by the people are tennis, sepak takraw, volleyball, softball and football. The people of the town are also huge fans of boxing, FIFA World Cup and NBA. Some of the town's youth are perennial champions in sepak takraw and softball while they also reap gold medals in athletics and tennis in Palarong Pambansa through the years.

== Infrastructure ==
=== Transportation ===
The town is accessible by several land vehicles. Jeepneys, tricycles and motorcycles are the main transportation. Jeepneys and motorcycles ply daily or several times a week to several barangays most especially to the remote upland villages and in the Seven Cities transporting farm produce to the town's public market and sometimes delivering it to Iloilo City's public and supermarkets. There are also weekly regular stops of Roro bus vehicles loading and unloading passengers to and from Roro ferry ships. Taxis occasionally pass by to load and unload passengers to and from the city but picking up a taxi in the town is made easier by taxi booking app Grab.

=== Energy ===
Electricity first came to Alimodian after the war in 1946 with the first street lighting system provided by Alimodian Electric Light Service of Mrs. Natalia Amparado. The commercial and public use of electricity in the town was first available on May 5, 1975, bringing lights and improving the lives of the people. In the beginning three hundred fifty households in the town proper and another forty-two households in Barangay Balabago, Bancal, Buhay and Lanot were serviced by ILECO I, the main energy provider of the town. Today, the town is 100% completely energized as all the fifty-one (51) barangays have access to electricity.

=== Telecommunications ===
Telephone services in town is provided by PLDT since 1996. PLDT has a sub-station in Barangay Bancal and services three towns of ALEOSAN (Alimodian, Leon and San Miguel). Wireless mobile services in the town were started in 2003 and were provided by Globe Telecom and Smart.

=== Internet ===
Internet broadband network services is offered by PLDT and Globe to the people of Alimodian to get wired and connected to the rest of the world and stay in touch with their families, friends and other people through social media and VoIP apps. Wi-fi network services are also made available by PLDT and Globe. Other options include pocket wifi, Piso wifi and mobile Internet powered by Globe and Smart.

== Education ==
The Alimodian I Schools District Office governs all educational institutions within the municipality. It oversees the management and operations of all private and public, from primary to secondary schools.

Primary and elementary schools

- Abang-Abang Elementary School
- Alimodian Central Elementary School
- Amaquin Memorial Elementary School
- Bancal Elementary School
- Cagay Elementary School
- Cunsad Primary School
- Cuyad Elementary School
- Desamparados Amita Elementary School
- Exploring Minds Academy of Learning
- Felix Amparado Memorial Elementary School
- Ingwan Elementary School
- Gelacio Allones Memorial Elementary School
- Pajo Primary School
- Quinaspan Elementary School
- Ugbo Elementary School
- Ulay-Bugang Elementary School
- Saint Thomas Kinder School

Secondary schools

- Alimodian National Comprehensive High School
- Bancal National High School

== Media ==
=== Radio and television ===
The town receives almost every radio wave frequency (am / fm) from all radio stations in the province.

Free-to-air channels were accessible to households with television with excellent reception except in the remote barangays and communities where there are good reception of some of these free viewing channels. Direct-to-home satellite providers such as Cignal, Dream, G Sat and Sky Direct offer optional subscription to fine tune the reception quality of channels and program as well as provide additional channels and entertainment to families enjoying television viewing.

=== Newspaper ===
Alimodian Iloilo Today is the official news publication of the municipality.

== Further reading and viewing ==
=== Books ===
- Alimodian LGU. Alimodian Patronal Town Fiesta Souvenir Program Makinaugalingon Press, 2016.
- Caparanga, Leila and Victor Amantillo Jr. Alimodian: Its Yesterday, Today and Tomorrow Makinaugalingon Press, 1985.

=== Video journals ===
- Alimodian Iloilo, another beautiful town in Iloilo Province, Philippines (Part 1) – My Philippine Journey, YouTube (2014, 11 min)
- Alimodian Iloilo, another beautiful town in Iloilo Province, Philippines (Part 2) – My Philippine Journey, YouTube (2014, 8 min)
- Alimodian Fiesta Slideshow – Jay Laurista, YouTube (2015, 12 min 49 sec)
- Santa Climb to Seven Cities – Alimodian, Iloilo, Philippines – Bert Esposado, YouTube (2015, 9 min)
- Iloilo 4K Drone || City Proper & Alimodian – LifeAfterShift, YouTube (2016, 3 min 16 sec.)
