= Michael Gorriceta =

Filipino politician

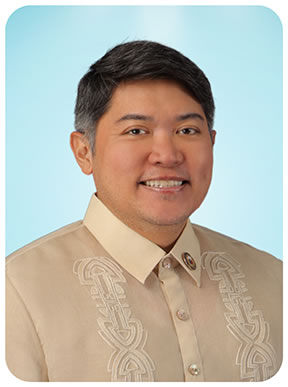
- Official portrait, 2022

Member of the House of Representatives of the Philippines from Iloilo's 2nd District
- In office June 30, 2019 – June 30, 2025
- Preceded by: Arcadio Gorriceta
- Succeeded by: Kathryn Joyce Gorriceta

Mayor of Pavia, Iloilo
- In office June 30, 2013 – June 30, 2019
- Vice Mayor: Raymund Gumban
- Preceded by: Arcadio Gorriceta
- Succeeded by: Laurence Anthony Gorriceta

Personal details
- Born: Michael Barrido Gorriceta; October 5, 1976 (age 49) Iloilo City, Philippines
- Party: Nacionalista (2018–present)
- Other political affiliations: Liberal (2009–2018); Lakas (2007–2009)
- Spouse: Kathryn Joyce Gorriceta

Michael Barrido Gorriceta (born October 5, 1976) is a Filipino politician who was a member of the House of Representatives. He represented Iloilo's 2nd congressional district from 2019 to 2025. He was succeeded by his wife. He succeeded his father Arcadio H. Gorriceta.

== See also ==
- 18th Congress of the Philippines
- 19th Congress of the Philippines
