= Kathryn Joyce Gorriceta =

Filipino physician and politician

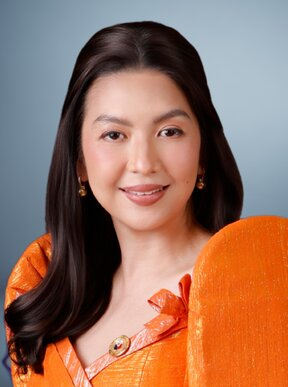
- Official portrait, 2025

Member of the House of Representatives of the Philippines from Iloilo's 2nd District
- Incumbent
- Assumed office June 30, 2025
- Preceded by: Michael Gorriceta

Personal details
- Born: August 12, 1980 (age 45) Iloilo City, Philippines
- Party: Lakas (2024–present)
- Spouse: Michael Gorriceta

Kathryn Joyce "Kathy" Fermin-Gorriceta (born August 12, 1980) is a Filipino physician and politician who is a member of the House of Representatives. She has represented Iloilo's 2nd congressional district since 2025. She succeeded her husband.

== See also ==
- List of female members of the House of Representatives of the Philippines
