= Fornier =

Fornier is a surname. Notable people with the surname include:

- Jose Fornier (1913–1979), Filipino politician
- Jacques Fornier (1926–2020), French theatrical actor and director
- Jacques Fournier, birth name of Pope Benedict XII
- François Seydoux Fornier de Clausonne (1905–1981), French diplomat
- Léa Hélène Seydoux-Fornier de Clausonne, known as Léa Seydoux, French actress
- Tobias Fornier (1902–1964), Filipino politician and namesake of the municipality of Tobias Fornier, Antique
