= National Historical Shrines in the Philippines =

National Historical Shrines
- Pambansang Dambanang Pangkasaysayan (Filipino)
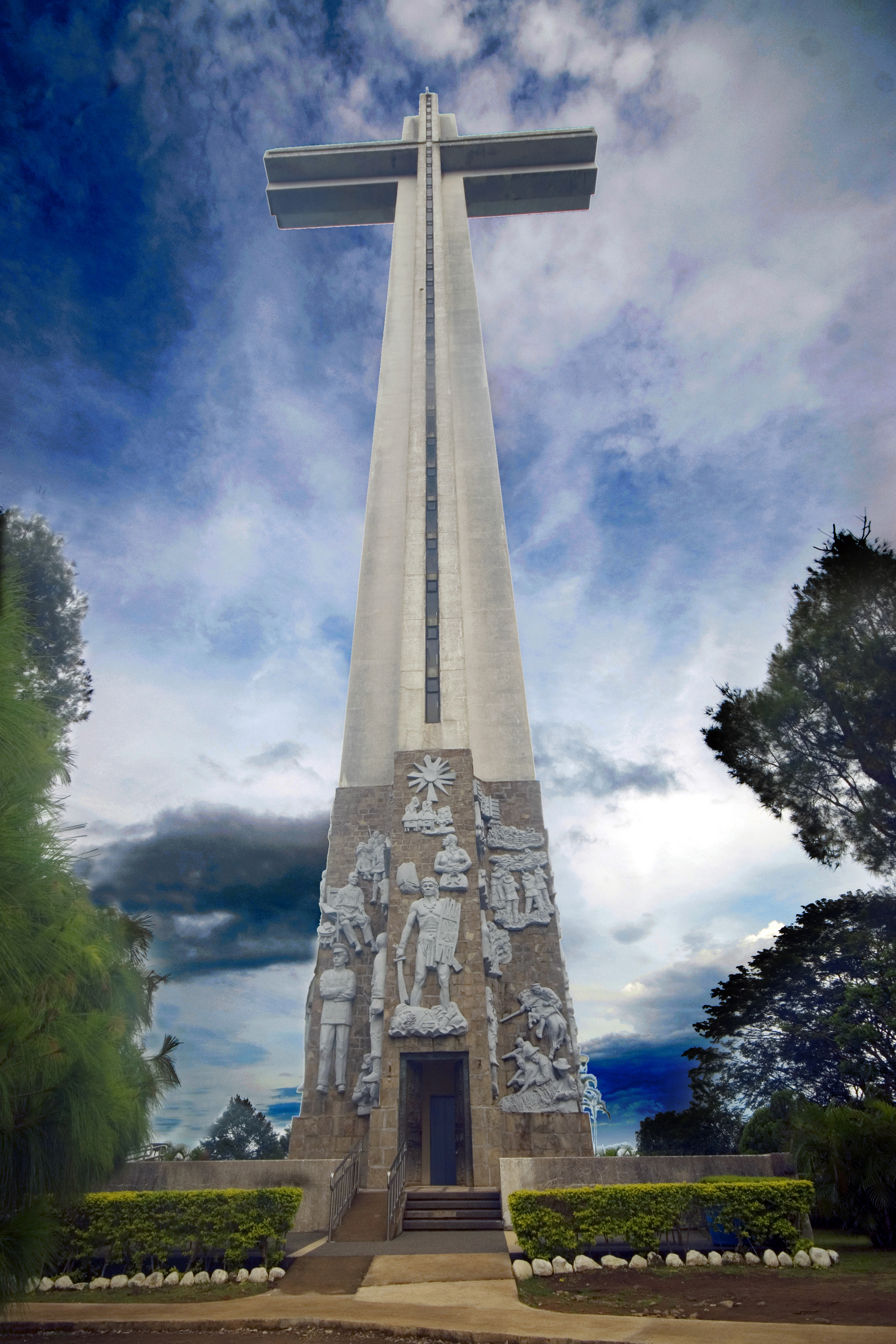
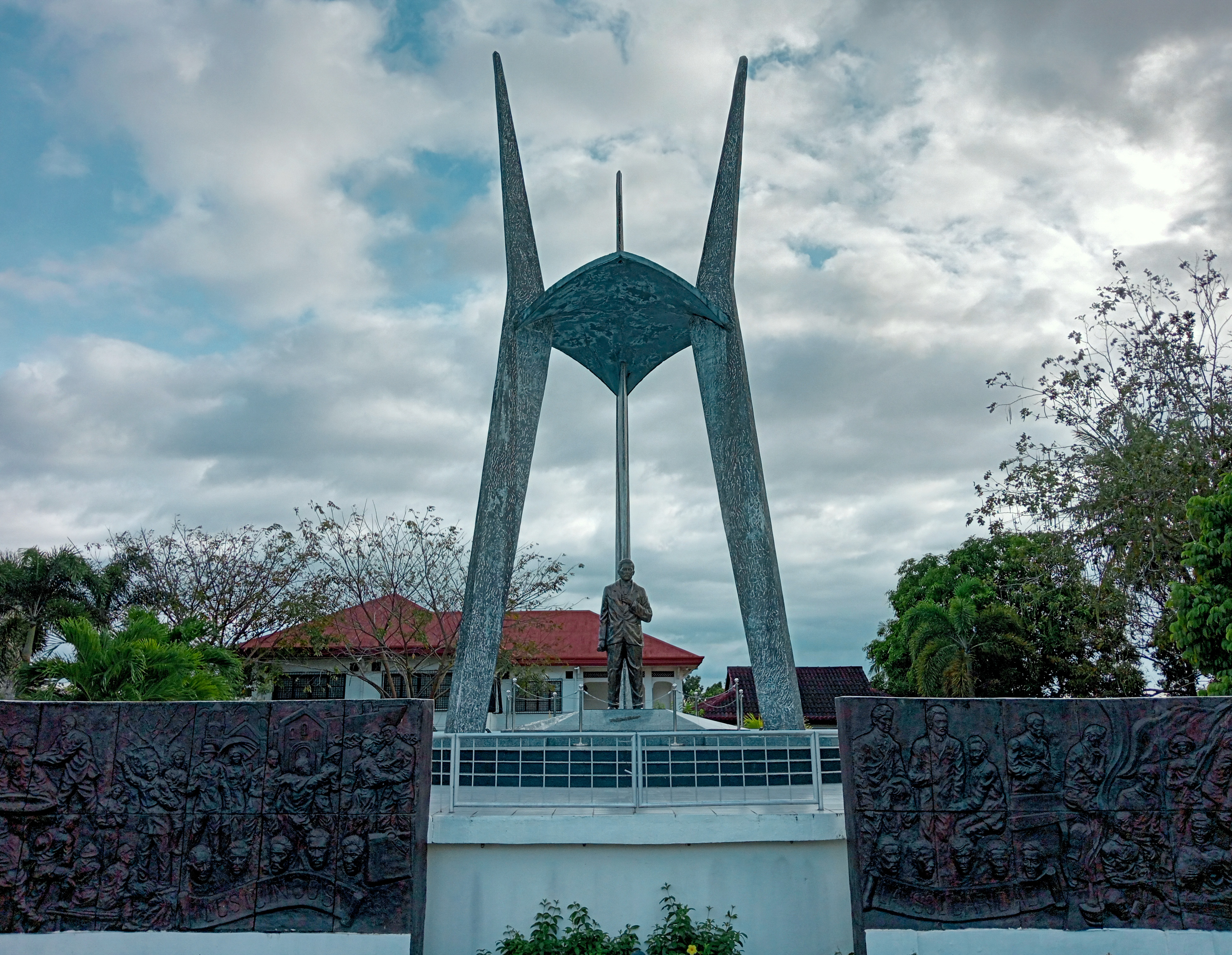
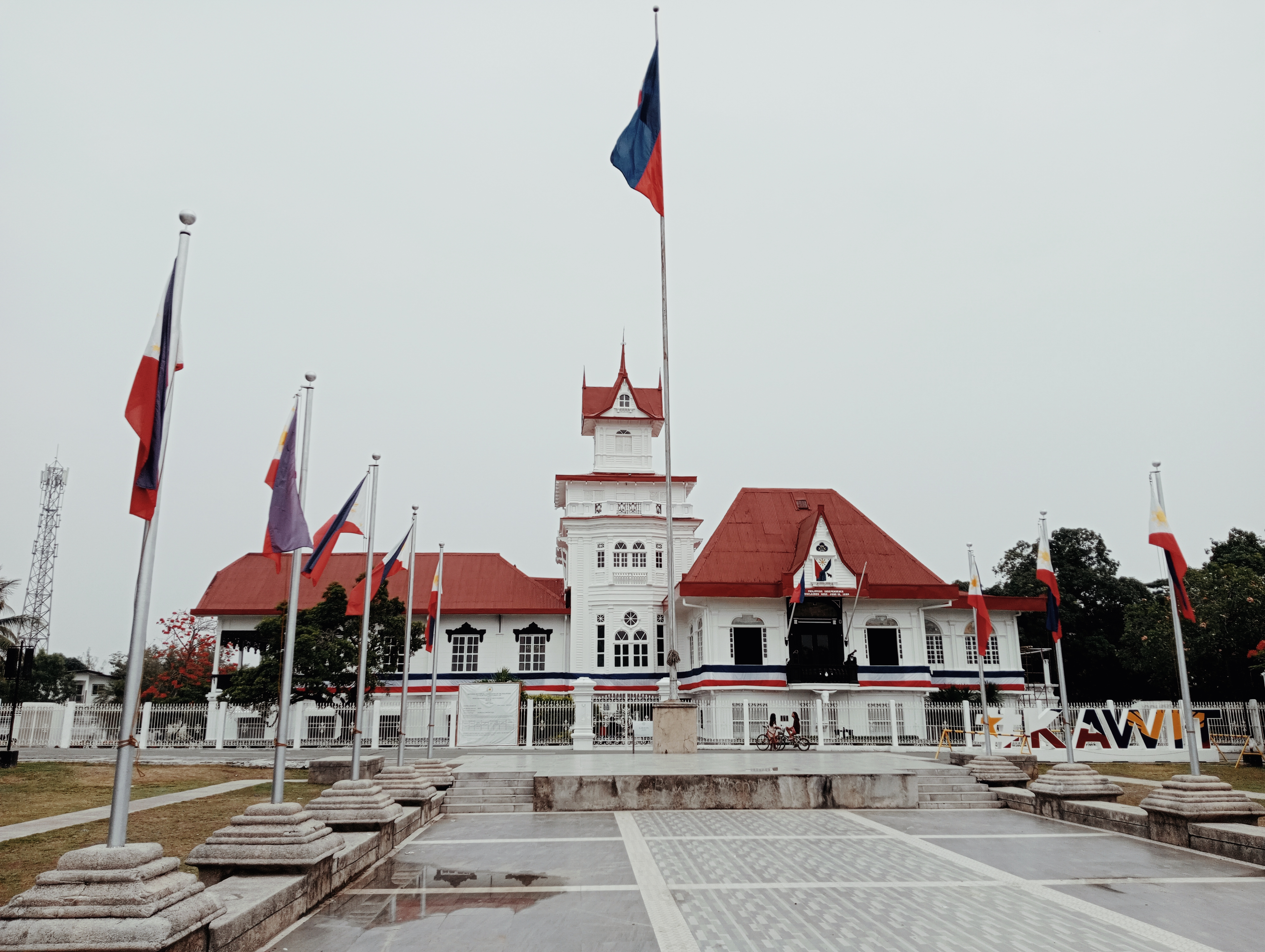
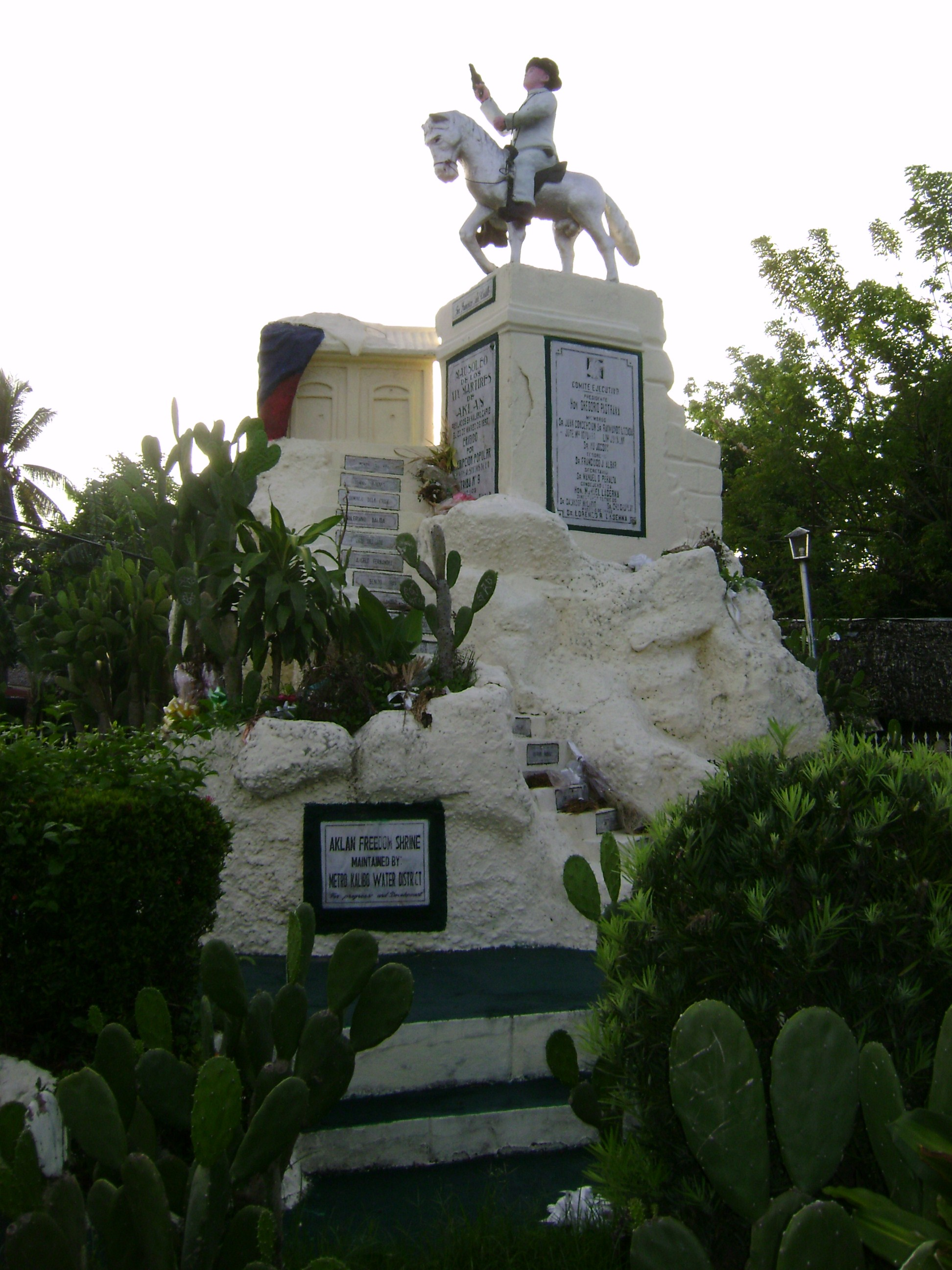
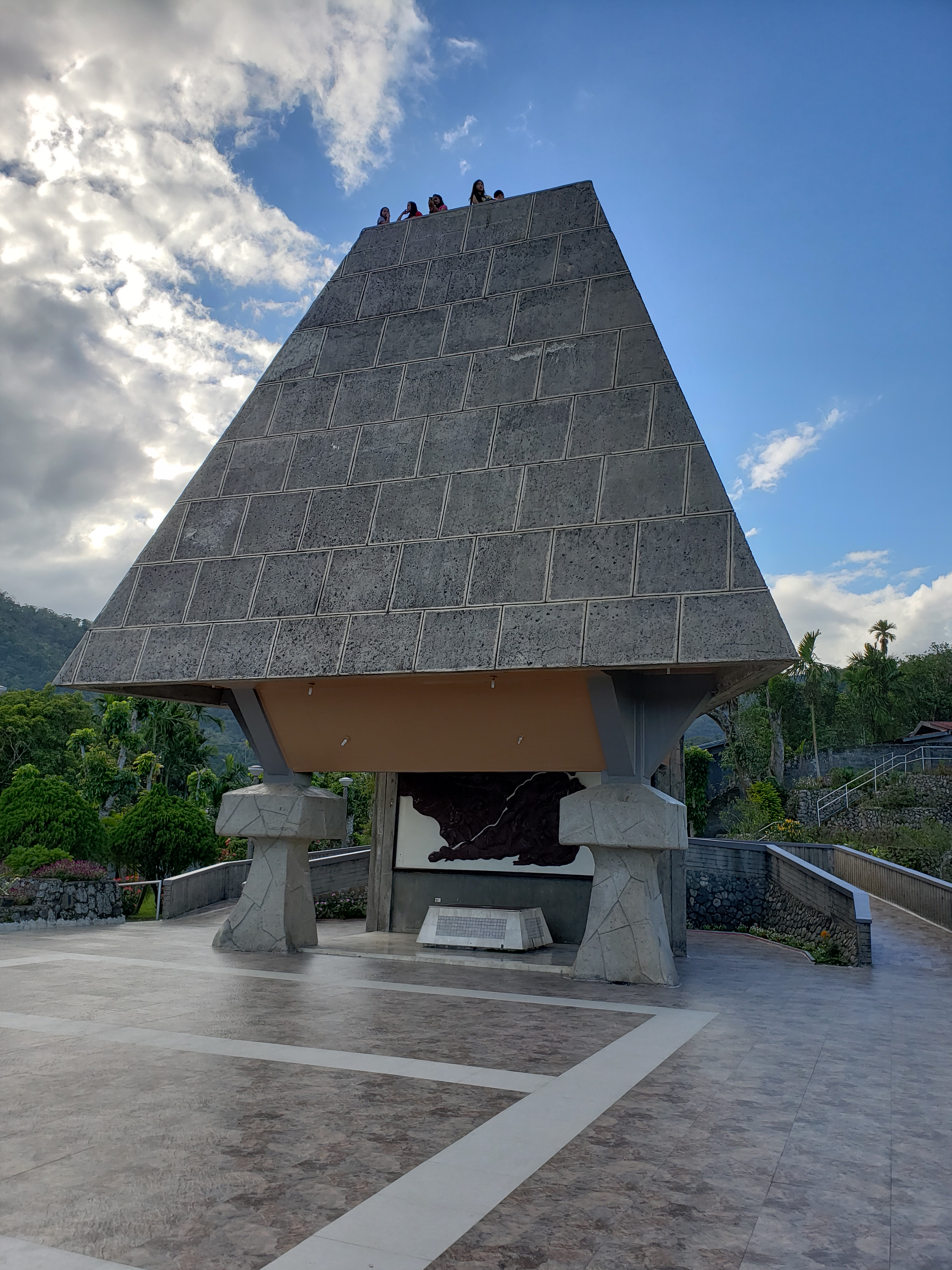
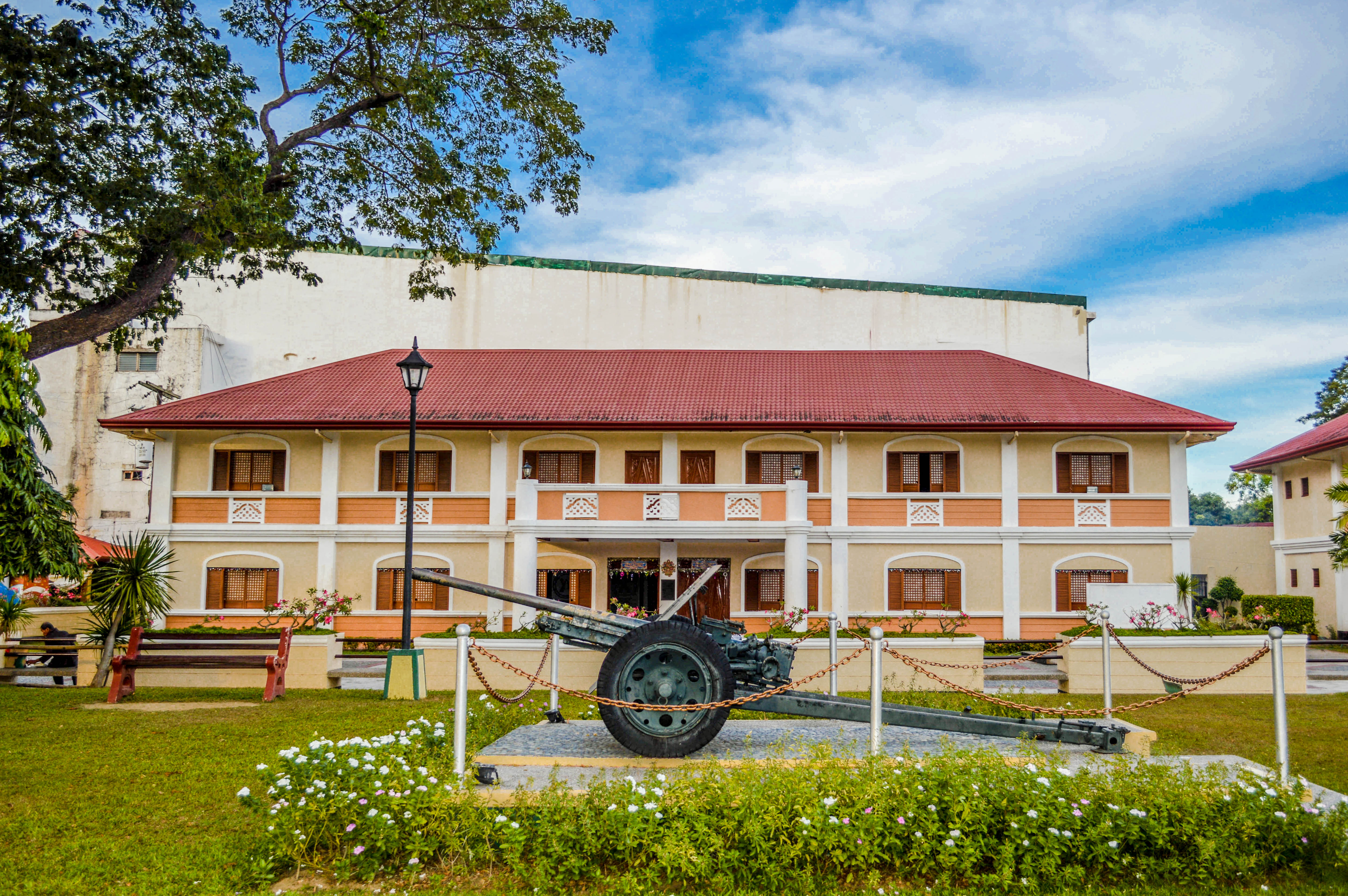
- Clockwise, from top left: Mount Samat National Shrine, Marcelo H. del Pilar Shrine, Aklan Freedom Shrine, Ricarte shrine, Kiangan National Shrine, Aguinaldo Shrine

Designation details
- Also known as: National Shrines
- Authority: National Historical Commission of the Philippines; Philippine Veterans Affairs Office some Local government units
- Country: Philippines
- Listed in: Philippine Registry of Cultural Property

National Historical Shrines, more commonly known as National Shrines, are sites or structures in the Philippines that have been declared hallowed and revered due to their historical association to certain figures or events. Their designation are done by presidential decrees and executive orders, acts of congress (or by their predecessors) and the National Historical Commission of the Philippines (NHCP).

== Background ==
Presidential Decree No. 105, issued in 1973 defines national shrines as sites associated with significant events in the lives of great and eminent leaders of the nation, such as sites of their birth, exile, imprisonment and/ or death. While this definition provides a foundational understanding, it could be expanded to encompass a broader range of historical and cultural significance, which have extended to military sites and battlefields.

RA 10066, sec. 22 reinforces the protection of national shrines (as with other declared cultural property) by prohibiting the renaming of sites unless a written approval by the National Historical Commission of the Philippines, and only after due hearing on the matter. This measure ensures that these historical sites retain their original identities and the sacredness of the site.

The NHCP plays a pivotal role in preserving and managing national shrines. The commission's board oversees the declaration of these sites and ensures their protection. It is of note that many national shrines have been declared by Republic Acts.

However, it's important to note that military memorials and battle monuments designated as national shrines fall under the purview of the Philippine Veterans Affairs Office (PVAO), operating within the Department of National Defense. Moreover, local government units often play a significant role in the establishment, maintenance, and preservation of national shrines. A notable example is the Melchora (Tandang Sora) Aquino National Shrine, which was developed through the initiative and efforts of the local government.

== Privileges and Protections of declared National Historical shrines ==
The privileges and protections to National Historical Shrines are as follows

=== Privileges ===
- Identification, maintenance, restoration, conservation, preservation and protection of shrines
- Collection of fees for the use of the NHCP's resources and for technical services rendered, as well as entrance fees to its Shrines

=== Protections ===
- Protection from modification, alteration, destruction, construction or real estate development, which includes its buffer zones, without written permission from the NHCP
- Prohibition and fines for desecration of national shrines by disturbing their peace and serenity through digging, excavating, defacing, causing unnecessary noise, and committing unbecoming acts within their premises.

== Declared National Historical Shrines in the Philippines ==
Image	Official National Historical Shrine/ National Shrine name	Description	Location	Legal Basis	Year declared
	Shrine of Freedom (Dambana ng Kalayaan) (Note: Section 1 of RA 597 s. 1951 declares Fort Santiago as "Shrine of freedom", on the other hand, Section 5 of RA 1607, s. 1956 declares that Fort Santiago would be known as the "Dambana ng Kalayaan", the same name but in Filipino.)	Declares Fort Santiago as Shrine of Freedom. Dedicated to the memory of Rizal and a Legion of National Heroes and Martyrs who had been confined as lost their lives within said premises Includes: National Plaza of the Unknown Hero (Unbuilt); Ayuntamiento; Former site of the Palacio Del Gobernador-Heneral (Note: The structure on the site was rebuilt in 1976.)	Intramuros, Manila	Declaration: RA 597 s. 1951, RA 1607, s. 1956	1951
	All battlefields of Corregidor and Bataan province	Site of WW2 Battlefields	Corregidor Island; Bataan Province	Declaration: EO no. 58, 1954	1954
	The Site in Magallanes, Limasawa Island in the Province Of Leyte, Where The First Mass In The Philippines	Also known as the National Shrine to the First Mass, more commonly known as Limasawa Shrine, this site commemorates the birth of Christianity in the Philippines	Limasawa Island, Leyte	Declaration: RA 2733	1960
	Freedom Shrine (Aguinaldo Shrine) (Note: PD no. 105 s. 1973 names the site as Aguinaldo Mansion in Kawit, Cavite)	The site is the largely renovated ancestral house and land donated to by General Emilio Aguinaldo- First President of the Philippines, to the nation in 1963. Also contains his tomb. Inclusions from RA 4039 include: Freedom house- which would depict, stage by stage important events in the Philippine revolution (unbuilt)	Kawit, Cavite	Declaration: RA 4039	1964
	Casa Real	A Spanish-era building which, among other things housed the First printing press of the First Republic of the Philippines	Malolos, Bulacan	Declaration: EO 173 s. 1965	1965
	Mt. Samat National Shrine (Dambana ng Kagitingan (Note: The name "Dambana ng Kagitingan" is what appears in the historical marker installed by the National Historical commission in 1966.))	Built in honor and in the memory of soldiers who fought and perished during WW2	Pilar, Bataan	Exclusion of land from the Bataan National Park reservation to create the Mt. Samat National Shrine: Proclamation No. 25, s. 1966	1966
	Fort San Antonio Abad	Spanish colonial era fortification	Malate, Manila	Reservation for National Shrine purposes: Proclamation no. 207, s. 1967	1967
	Libingan ng mga Bayani	First established as Republic Memorial Cemetery as a tribute to soldiers who died during WW2. Final resting place of Philippine presidents, Medal of valor recipients and other persons entitled to internment at this National Shrine	Taguig	Act to construct a Pantheon of Illustrious Filipinos: Act no. 1856 s. 1908; Providing for the construction of a National Pantheon: RA 289; Reservation of land for National Shrine Purposes: Proclamation no. 208, s. 1967	Site reserved for National Shrine purposes: 1967
	Tirad Pass National Shrine	Site and Memorial to the Battle of Tirad Pass	Gregorio Del Pilar, Sigay, Quirino, Cervantes and Suyo, Ilocos Sur	Declaration: Proclamation no. 433, s. 1968	1968
	Mabini Shrine	Replica House of where Apolinario Mabini-First Prime Minister of the Philippines lived when he studied law and where he died. Contains the	Pandacan, Manila (Note: The site where the house once stood was in Pandacan, Manila along the banks of the Nagtahan river. This was original location of the National Shrine contained in Proclamation no. 324, s. 1968. The house was moved several times due to developments of the Nagtahan Bridge (now Mabini Bridge).); Sta. Mesa, Manila (Note: Proclamation 1992, s. 2010 declares PUP- Sta Mesa as the permanent home of the Mabini shrine. No law or legal declaration rescinds the Pandacan site.)	Reservation of Pandacan site: Proclamation 324, s. 1968 Declaring the Sta Mesa site as the permanent home of the Mabini Shrine: Proclamation 1992, s. 2010	1968
	Liberty Shrine	More commonly known as Mactan Shrine, the site commemorates what is believed to be the environs where the Battle of Mactan occurred Includes: Magellan Monument; Lapulapu Monument; Liberty House; Other improvements made on the site	Mactan Island, Cebu	Declaration: RA 5695, PD 260 s. 1973	1969
	Ricarte Shrine	Birth site of Artemio Ricarte- General of the Philippine Revolution	Batac, Ilocos Norte	Declaration: RA 5648	1969
	Aglipay Shrine	Birthplace of Gregorio Aglipay- reformer and firstObispo Maximo of the Philippine Independent church	Batac, Ilocos Norte	Declaration: RA 5649	1969
	Birthplace of Dr. Jose Rizal in Calamba, Laguna	Reconstructed birthplace on the land once owned by the Rizals. Also the reinterment site of Francisco and Teodora Rizal.	Calamba, Laguna	Declaration: PD 105 1973	1973
	Talisay, Dapitan City, where the hero (Jose Rizal) was exiled for four years	More popularly known as the Rizal National Shrine. Site where Rizal lived and developed during his exile from 1982 to 1986. The site is integrated in the Jose Rizal Memorial Protected Landscape	Dapitan City, Zamboanga Del Norte	Declaration: PD 105 1973	1973
	Talaga, Tanauan, Batangas where Apolinario Mabini was born	Birthplace and final resting place of Apolinario Mabini, first prime minister of the Philippines	Tanauan, Batangas	Declaration: PD 105 1973	1973
Pinaglabanan Shrine 01	Pinaglabanan Memorial Shrine	Site of the Battle of Pinaglabanan- first battle of the Filipino people against the Spanish	San Juan City	Declaration: PD 260, s. 1973 (Note: PD 260, s. 1973 is what appears in the historical marker installed by the National Historical Institute, however, the law does not expressly declare the site as National shrine. The National Registry of Historical sites and structures lists the site as Level I- National shrine)	1973
	Kiangan War Memorial Shrine	Commemorates the site where Tomoyuki Yamashita and in his capacity, the Japanese Imperial forces surrendered, signaling the end of the Japanese occupation of the Philippines	Kiangan, Ifugao	Declaration as Military Shrine: Proclamation No. 1460, s. 1975; Declaration as National Shrine: Proclamation No. 1682, s. 1977	1975
	Karim Ul-Makhdum Mosque of Simunul, Tawi-Tawi	Mosque built by Sheikh Karim Ul-Makhdum- Arab missionary, in 1380. Current structure was rebuilt in the 1960s as the original was burned during WW2.	Simunul, Tawi-Tawi	Declaration: BP 150	1982
	General Leandro Locsin Fullon National Shrine	Final resting place of Leandro Locsin Fullon, Filipino General of the Philippine Revolution and Liberator of Antique Includes: The monument of General Fullon; The public plaza of Hamtic, Antique	Hamtic, Antique	Declaration: BP no. 309 s. 1982	1982
	Capas National Shrine	Memorial to the Allied soldiers who were incarcerated and died in Camp O'donell	Capas, Tarlac	Reservation of Land for National Shrine Purposes: Proclamation no. 842	1991
	Balantang Memorial Cemetery National Shrine (Note: NHI resolution no. 7, s. 1991 further declares Balantang Cemetery as National Memorial shrine.)	Burial ground dedicated to the memory of Panay and Romblon soldiers who fought in WW2	Jaro, Iloilo	Declaration: NHI Resolution no. 7, s. 1991	1991
	Don Paciano Rizal House	Retirement home of Paciano Rizal- general of the Philippine Revolution and Filipino- American War. His final resting place, together with sisters Trinidad and Narcisa.	Los Baños, Laguna	Declaration: NHI Resolution no. 1, s. 1992	1992
	The Burial Site Of Sheik Karimol Makhdum in Tandu Banak, Sibutu, Tawi-Tawi (Note: The historical marker on the site removes the barrio name "Tandu Banak" which was expressed in the NHI resolution)	Burial Site of Sheik Karimol Makhdum, Arab Missionary who brought Islam to Tawi-tawi	Sibutu, Tawi-Tawi	Declaration: NHI Resolution No. 6, S. 1993	1993
	Andres Bonifacio Shrine	Shrine dedicated to Andres Bonifacio- Father of the Katipunan, in recognition for starting and leading the 1896 Philippine Revolution. Declared during the centenary of his death	Manila	Declaration: Proclamation No. 1132, s. 1997	1997
	Marcelo H. Del Pilar Shrine	Birthsite and re-internment site of Marcelo H. Del Pilar- Filipino reformist and nationalist	Bulakan, Bulacan	Declaration: Resolution No. 1, S. 2006	2006
	Melchora (Tandang Sora) Aquino National Shrine	Birthplace and re-internment site of Melchora "Tandang Sora" Aquino, Mother of the Katipunan.	Bo. Banlat, Quezon city	Declaration: NHCP Resolution No. 04, S. 2012	2012
	Balete Pass National shrine	Site of the Battle of Balete Pass	Dalton Pass, Santa Fe, Nueva Vizcaya	Declaration: RA 10796	2016
	Aklan Freedom Shrine	Final resting place of the Nineteen Martyrs of Aklan	Kalibo, Aklan	Declaration: NHCP Resolution No. 8, s. 2019	2019

== Unbuilt, reclassified, or delisted National Historical Shrines ==
Name of site	Description	Status	References
Rizal Cultural shrine	RA 1427 stipulates the construction of the Rizal Cultural shrine (which was to be dubbed a National Cultural shrine) consisting of a national theater, national museum and a national library. Debates over the site of the shrine and the slow funding made the shrine in its entirety unrealized. Only the National Library was inaugurated in time for the Jose Rizal Centennial celebrations. Plans for the national theater was redesigned to create the Rizal Theater in Makati (Note: The Rizal theater in Makati was demolished in the 1960s.).	Partially built	
Bessang Pass National Shrine	Site of the Battle of Bessang Pass. Declared as National Shrine by virtue of Proclamation no. 54, s. 1954. Reclassified pursuant to Proclamation no. 284, s. 2000 as Bessang Pass Natural Monument. Recognized as National park under the E-NIPAS act of 2018.	Reclassified	Reclassification: Proclamation no. 284, s. 2000
“Red Beach,” the landing point of General Douglas MacArthur and the liberating forces	Site in Palo, Leyte where General Douglas MacArthur and the liberating forces arrived to start the recapture of the Philippines from the Japanese. Site first reserved for National Shrine purposes by virtue of Proclamation No. 1272, s. 1974. Reclassified as National Park through Letter of Instructions No. 572, s. 1977 as Macarthur Landing Memorial Park.	Reclassified	Reservation for National Shrine purposes: Proclamation No. 1272, s. 1974 Reclassification: Letter of Instructions No. 572, s. 1977
Where the Code of Kalantiaw was promulgated in 1443	Site in Aklan, where the Code of Kalantiaw- a supposed legal code, was promulgated. Discovered to be a hoax created by Jose E. Marco. Delisted by virtue of NHI resolution No. 12, S. 2004 which found the Code of Kalantiaw to have no valid historical basis.	Delisted	Declaration: EO 234 s. 1957 Delisted:NHI resolution No. 12, S. 2004

== Sites commonly associated as National Historical Shrines ==
- Bahay ni Luna (Juan Luna Shrine) in Badoc, Ilocos Norte (Note: The historical marker installed by the National Historical Institute in 1977 declares the site as National Historical Landmark. While the National Registry of Historical sites and structures declare it as Level I- Shrine, no law or proclamation from the NHCP or executive and legislative bodies of the Philippines declare it as such.) is expressed to as a National Landmark
- Quezon Memorial Shrine and National Monument in Quezon city (Note: The historical marker installed by the National Historical Commission (NHC) states that the Quezon Memorial Shrine (QMS) was declared a National Shrine in January 14, 1974. However, a review of the NHCP National Registry of Historic Sites and Structures website suggests that while the QMS is classified as a Level I Shrine, the legal bases cited, E.O. No. 79 s. 1945 and Resolution No. 4, s. 2015, do not explicitly declare it as a National Shrine.) is expressed to as National Monument

== Others ==
- The City of Dapitan is declared to as Shrine city due to the many cultural and historical objects associated with Jose Rizal

== Notes ==
1. Section 1 of RA 597 s. 1951 declares Fort Santiago as "Shrine of freedom", on the other hand, Section 5 of RA 1607, s. 1956 declares that Fort Santiago would be known as the "Dambana ng Kalayaan", the same name but in Filipino.
2. The structure on the site was rebuilt in 1976.
3. PD no. 105 s. 1973 names the site as Aguinaldo Mansion in Kawit, Cavite
4. The name "Dambana ng Kagitingan" is what appears in the historical marker installed by the National Historical commission in 1966.
5. The site where the house once stood was in Pandacan, Manila along the banks of the Nagtahan river. This was original location of the National Shrine contained in Proclamation no. 324, s. 1968. The house was moved several times due to developments of the Nagtahan Bridge (now Mabini Bridge).
6. Proclamation 1992, s. 2010 declares PUP- Sta Mesa as the permanent home of the Mabini shrine. No law or legal declaration rescinds the Pandacan site.
7. PD 260, s. 1973 is what appears in the historical marker installed by the National Historical Institute, however, the law does not expressly declare the site as National shrine. The National Registry of Historical sites and structures lists the site as Level I- National shrine
8. NHI resolution no. 7, s. 1991 further declares Balantang Cemetery as National Memorial shrine.
9. The historical marker on the site removes the barrio name "Tandu Banak" which was expressed in the NHI resolution
10. The Rizal theater in Makati was demolished in the 1960s.
11. The historical marker installed by the National Historical Institute in 1977 declares the site as National Historical Landmark. While the National Registry of Historical sites and structures declare it as Level I- Shrine, no law or proclamation from the NHCP or executive and legislative bodies of the Philippines declare it as such.
12. The historical marker installed by the National Historical Commission (NHC) states that the Quezon Memorial Shrine (QMS) was declared a National Shrine in January 14, 1974. However, a review of the NHCP National Registry of Historic Sites and Structures website suggests that while the QMS is classified as a Level I Shrine, the legal bases cited, E.O. No. 79 s. 1945 and Resolution No. 4, s. 2015, do not explicitly declare it as a National Shrine.
