= 2022 Philippine presidential election in Antique =

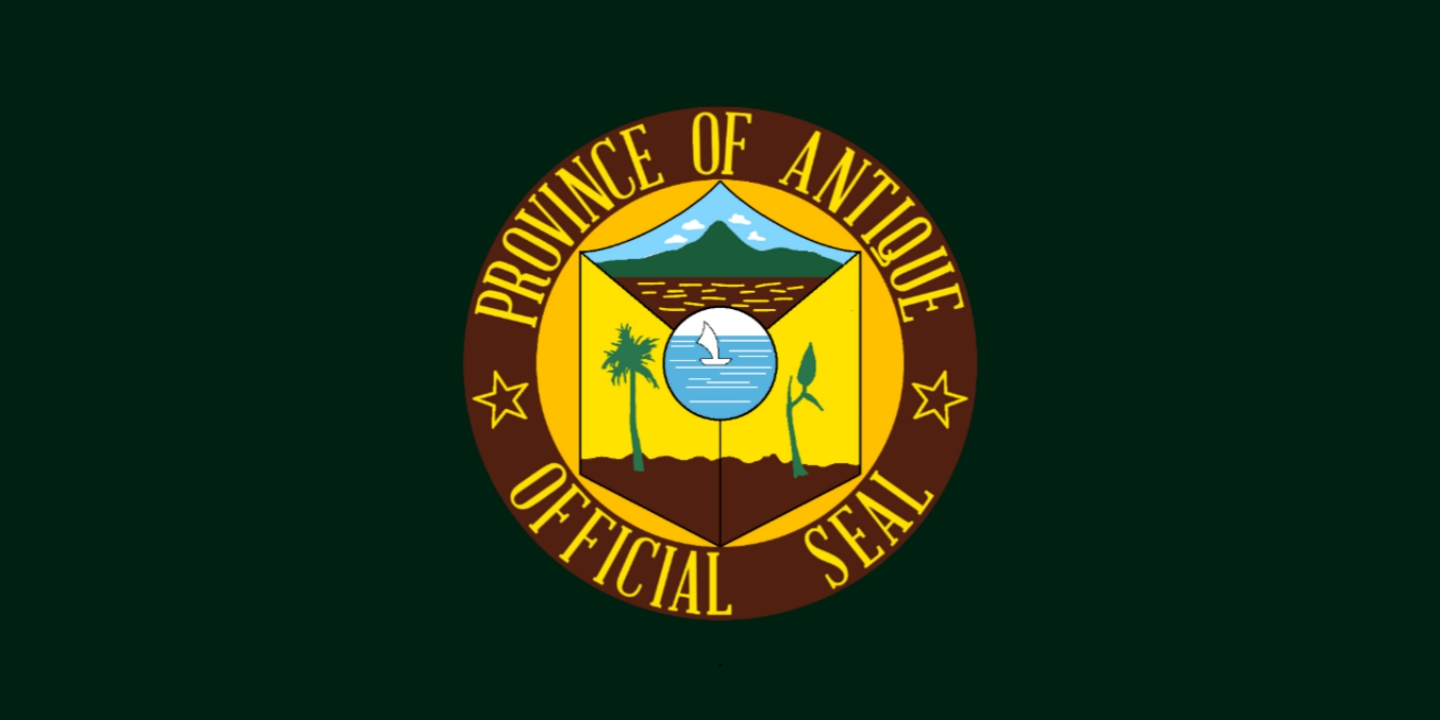
- May 9, 2022
- Registered: 387,998
- Turnout: 87.18%
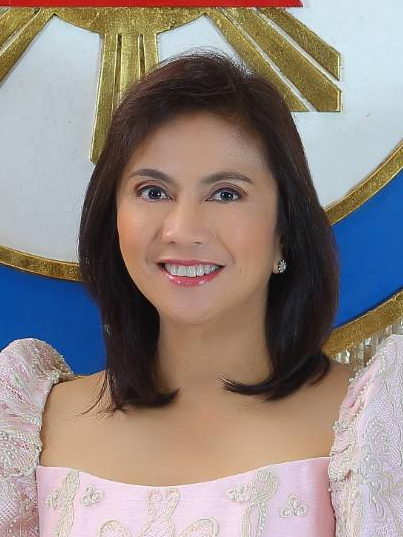

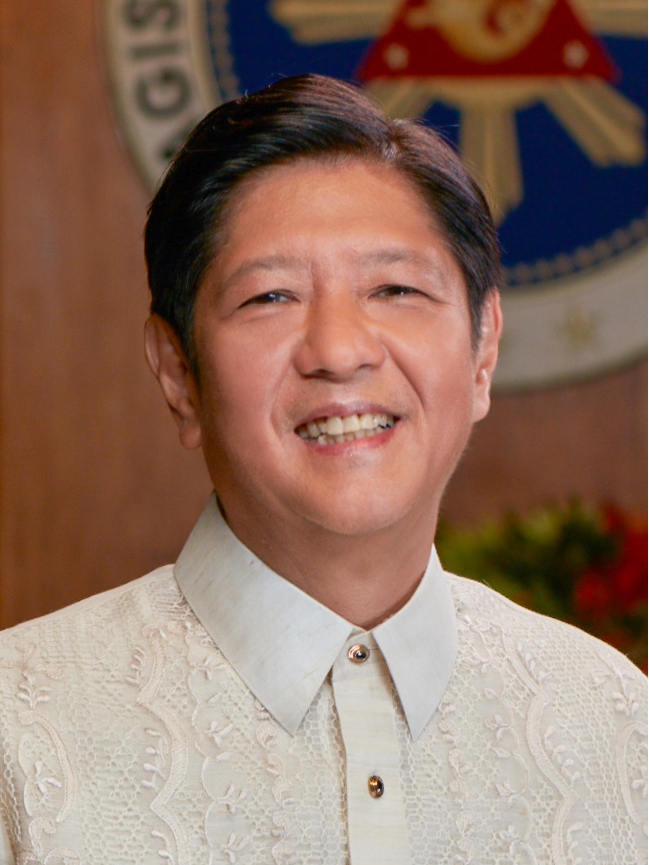
Candidate	Leni Robredo	Bongbong Marcos
Party	Independent	PFP
Alliance	TRoPa	UniTeam
Running mate	Kiko Pangilinan	Sara Duterte
Popular vote	142,663	115,027
Percentage	44.73%	36.07%
Home province/city	Naga City	Ilocos Norte

Robredo
30%–40%
40%–50%
50%–60%
60%–70%
70%–80%
Marcos
30%–40%
40%–50%
50%–60%
60%–70%
70%–80%
Pacquiao
30%–40%
40%–50%
50%–60%
60%–70%
Moreno
30%–40%
Tie
President before election
Rodrigo Duterte
PDP-Laban
Elected President
Bongbong Marcos
PFP

The 2022 Philippine presidential election in Antique was held on Monday, May 9, 2022, as part of the 2022 Philippine general election in which all provinces, higly urbanized cities, and independent component cities participated. The electorate of Antique cast their votes for the president.

A predominantly rural province in Western Visayas, Antique is considered a reliable province for Robredo. In the 2016 vice-presidential election, Robredo carried the province by approximately 32 percentage points over Bongbong Marcos. It was widely expected that Antique would maintain this trend in 2022,

Robredo, running as an independent, secured victory in Antique, garnering 142,663 votes or 44.73% of the total votes cast. Former senator Bongbong Marcos of Partido Federal ng Pilipinas (PFP), Robredo's main rival, received 115,027 votes, which amounted to 36.07%.

Although Robredo won Antique with 44.73% of the vote against Marcos's 36.07%, her margin of victory represented a significant narrowing compared to the 2016 result. This pattern of shrinking opposition leads was similarly observed in neighboring provinces across Western Visayas and in other traditional opposition strongholds elsewhere in the country. Antique is one of only fifteen provinces nationwide where Robredo placed first.

== Campaign ==
=== Robredo ===
Robredo held a rally at the Evelio B. Javier Freedom Park in San Jose de Buenavista, the provincial capital, drawing at least 4,000 supporters. Edgar Denosta, the provincial vice governor, as well as several vice mayors and councilors, were present at the event. Governor Rhodora Cadiao and all 18 of the province's mayors were notably absent. Robredo's campaign in the province was driven largely by volunteers organized under local chapters of the Robredo People's Council, consistent with her broader national campaign which she described as a "people's campaign."

=== Marcos ===
Marcos faced significant difficulties in staging a campaign presence in Antique. A UniTeam rally initially scheduled for February 24 at the Evelio B. Javier Freedom Park was postponed following a public backlash from residents, who objected to the holding of a Marcos campaign event at the site where former governor Evelio Javier, a staunch opponent of Marcos's father and director of Corazon Aquino's 1986 snap election campaign in the province, was assassinated on February 11, 1986. Javier's son, Gideon, was among those who publicly denounced the planned rally, calling it "insulting" to his family and to Antique. Marcos spokesman Vic Rodriguez confirmed the postponement, stating the campaign had decided "to adjust our schedule to a later date in the spirit of peace and unity," without directly acknowledging the protests as the reason.

== Results ==
2022 Philippine presidential election in Antique
Party	Candidate	Votes	%
Independent	Leni Robredo	142,663	44.73%
PFP	Bongbong Marcos	115,027	36.07%
PROMDI	Manny Pacquiao	30,190	9.47%
Aksyon	Isko Moreno	22,126	6.94%
Independent	Ping Lacson	5,312	1.67%
Independent	Ernie Abella	5,312	1.67%
PLM	Leody de Guzman	846	0.27%
PDSP	Norberto Gonzales	685	0.21%
DPP	Jose Montemayor Jr.	641	0.20%
Katipunan	Faisal Mangondato	303	0.10%
Total votes		318,940	100.00%

=== By municipality ===
Municipality	Leni Robredo Independent		Bongbong Marcos PFP		Other candidates		Margin		Total
Municipality	#	%	#	%	#	%	#	%	Total
Anini-y	4,864	42.29%	4,415	38.38%	2,223	19.33%	449	3.90%	11,502
Barbaza	6,571	50.92%	4,052	31.40%	2,282	17.68%	2,519	19.52%	12,905
Belison	3,814	45.29%	3,706	44.00%	902	10.71%	108	1.28%	8,422
Bugasong	8,152	43.97%	6,356	34.28%	4,032	21.75%	1,796	9.69%	18,540
Caluya	6,517	34.85%	8,350	44.66%	3,831	20.49%	-1,833	-9.80%	18,698
Culasi	11,011	47.98%	7,377	32.14%	4,562	19.88%	3,634	15.83%	22,950
Hamtic	9,822	38.59%	11,627	45.68%	4,002	15.72%	-1,805	-7.09%	25,451
Laua-an	6,541	42.47%	6,004	38.99%	2,855	18.54%	537	3.49%	15,400
Libertad	4,803	52.08%	3,165	34.32%	1,254	13.60%	1,638	17.76%	9,222
Pandan	8,883	42.79%	9,156	44.10%	2,721	13.11%	-273	-1.32%	20,760
Patnongon	10,042	55.51%	4,879	26.97%	3,171	17.53%	5,163	28.54%	18,092
San Jose de Buenavista	14,327	44.50%	11,741	36.47%	6,127	19.03%	2,586	8.03%	32,195
San Remigio	7,976	43.03%	4,999	26.97%	5,562	30.00%	2,977	16.06%	18,537
Sebaste	3,720	36.46%	4,370	42.83%	2,114	20.72%	-650	-6.37%	10,204
Sibalom	16,652	49.18%	10,727	31.68%	6,477	19.13%	5,925	17.50%	33,856
Tibiao	7,577	51.48%	4,345	29.52%	2,797	19.00%	3,232	21.96%	14,719
Tobias Fornier	6,769	41.51%	6,127	37.57%	3,411	20.92%	642	3.94%	16,307
Valderrama	4,622	41.34%	3,631	32.48%	2,927	26.18%	991	8.86%	11,180
Totals	142,663	44.73%	115,027	36.07%	61,250	19.20%	27,636	8.66%	318,940

== Analysis ==
Robredo's winning margin of approximately 8.66 percentage points in Antique, a lead of 27,636 votes, was a significant contraction from her performance in the province six years earlier. In the 2016 vice presidential race, she had carried Antique with 119,055 votes against Marcos's 44,663, a margin of roughly 32 percentage points. By 2022, Robredo grew her raw vote total to 142,663, while Marcos rose from 44,663 to 115,027.

Part of this shift is attributable to the consolidation of the race nationally. In 2016, votes in Antique were distributed across multiple vice-presidential candidates. In 2022, the contest was effectively a two-candidate race, with secondary candidates Manny Pacquiao, Isko Moreno, and Panfilo Lacson collectively drawing a much smaller share of the vote than the combined field had in 2016.

Marcos's improvement in Antique was consistent with a broader national pattern in which he expanded his vote in nearly every province, including those he ultimately lost. Marcos doubled, tripled, or more his 2016 totals even in Western Visayas provinces where Robredo retained the lead.

== See also ==
- 2022 Philippine presidential election
- 2022 Philippine general election
