= Ángelo Fernández =

Ángelo Fernández is one of the Nineteen Martyrs of Aklan (Spanish: Diecinueve mártires de Aklan), Filipino patriots who were executed by musketry in Kalibo, Aklan, Philippines on March 23, 1897 2: a.m, for cooperating with the Katipunan during the Philippine Revolution against Spain.

== Personal and family life ==
Ángelo Fernández was born from a Kalibonhon father and a Tagalog mother. He was a businessman engaged in a buy-and-sell business just before the outbreak of the revolution before the close of the 19th century. He was one of those men who led a busy and moderately provided life when fate swept him off his feet and involved him in that struggle which resulted to his gruesome death. He was happily married to Eugenia "Senyang" Fernández (Arcenia in other accounts) of Kalibo whom he did not have a child after six years of marriage.

== Forced entry to the Katipunan ==
One day when all paths led to Mabilo in Kalibo, Aklan where men submitted themselves to blood compact (also known as sandugo or pacto de sangre), Ángelo Fernández went with the others out of curiosity to see what is happening. They found the place a beehive of human activities. People got into small bamboo chapel which was the provisional recruiting office of the katipuneros, and later they came out with a wound at their forearm.

While Ángelo and his brother-in-law was trying to get information as to what it was all about, a big husky man who was Tomás Briones (also one of the nineteen martyrs), one of the officers, persuaded them to get inside the chapel, and once inside they were blind-folded with the others without their expressed consent. They were made to swear allegiance to the creed of the Katipunan by following after a dictated oath, after which the arm was pricked with a pointed blade until it bled.

Taking off the blindfold, they were made to sign their names on a scroll with their blood to signify that they are now members of the KKK. Then they were sent home. A few days later, he was called and given the rank of an officer of the organization because he was a good speaker and has shown signs of good leadership.

== Death of General Francisco del Castillo ==
When Francisco del Castillo entered the poblacion at the head of the ill-equipped troops to seek audience with the authorities under the Spanish yoke on the fateful day of March 17, 1897, Ángelo who was residing in the poblacion was not even informed of the hastily executed move, and so was not able to join. Nevertheless, when the troops dispersed upon the fall of their supremo and went hiding, Ángelo did not go out of town. He just hid from one house to another among his relatives.

He was among the first to surrender to the authorities when Monet's amnesty was announced, and he told the truth that he was an officer of the revolutionary army, whereupon he was immediately imprisoned and tied from behind. He stayed for a few days in prison before he was executed together with other suspected leaders.

== Death ==
Ángelo did not die during the night of the massacre. Tied arm to arm behind with the others, he fell after the volley of shots in the early morning of March 23, 1897 with the others, but he was not wounded. He was only injured from beating the previous evening.

For Ángelo, it was so many hours of pretending to be dead. All the time he was waiting for an opportunity to crawl away undetected and escape. But he was too weak to move and there was not a time when nobody was around, from the time at the break of day when all the nineteen where untied from the bamboo pole, to the time they are hauled and laid down at the town plaza, and later loaded on a cart and carted to the cemetery almost a kilometer away.

All the time that he was pretending to be dead as he lay under a pile of bodies, sticky and stinking with the acrid smell of blood, some of whom had their intestines and brains spelling over him, he could not move because the civil guards were always around. He was hoping that at the cemetery the civil guards would leave them before actual interment.

Fate had counted Angelo among the dead, although death actually came late. When the bodies were unloaded to the ground, the handlers were surprised to note that, while other bodies had stiffened, that of Angelo was limp and warm. That clue gave him away.

The discovery brought instant solution from the civil guards. One aimed his bayonet at the heart of Angelo, as he lay helpless, and gave him a quick thrust. The martyr just quivered and died.

== Legacy ==
The mortal remains of the 19 martyrs were relocated to a mausoleum now known as Aklan Freedom Shrine or locally known as Castillo.

In order to commemorate the death anniversary of the 19 Martyrs of Aklan, Republic Act No. 7806 was made into law setting the 23rd day of March of every year as a special public holiday in the Province of Aklan. A former general himself, President Fidel V. Ramos let Republic Act 7806 lapsed into law without his signature. And on September 1, 1994, in accordance with Article VI, Sec. 27(1) of the Constitution became law.

The street where they were massacred earlier known as Amadeo Street in Kalibo is now known as XIX Martyrs Street, in their honor.

As of 2015, a new building has been erected by his relatives in Kalibo, Aklan and named it as Angelo Fernandez Business Center in his honor, located just a block away from the Aklan Freedom Shrine.

On the 102nd martyrdom anniversary of the 19 Martyrs of Aklan on March 23, 2018, the National Historical Commission of the Philippines officially turned over to the Provincial Government of Aklan a tableau memorial in honor of the freedom heroes at the Goding Ramos Park.

== Published works ==
- Dela Cruz, Roman A. (1993) [1993]. Town of a Thousand (1st ed.). Kalibo, Aklan: Macar Publishing House. ISBN 971-9023-00-7.
