= Roman Aguirre =

Roman Selorio Aguirre is one of the Nineteen Martyrs of Aklan, Filipino patriots who were executed by musketry in Kalibo, Aklan, Philippines on March 23, 1897, at 2 a.m, for cooperating with the Katipunan during the Philippine Revolution against the Spanish Empire.

== Personal and family life ==
Born on August 9, 1864, Roman Aguirre hailed from Lezo, Aklan section of Capiz. He was a tailor and drummer by occupation and was residing in Kalibo poblacion.

As a tailor he was the best in town. In his hands passed the uniforms of many associations of the time: the white suit of the cuadrilleros (the policemen) and the linggons of the guardia civiles (civil guards).

He was also a skilled drummer of the local band. He had a big heart for the oppressed and the helpless, but his fists were fast as the sticks of his snare drum against the haughty, the high and the mighty.

Roman Aguirre's relatives called him Oma. Others called him Bugoy which means tough guy. He had a penchant for brawling. It is said he developed fever if he failed to feature in a fight for a long time. It's in his blood. He was only of regular Filipino height and build. To Roman Bugoy, anybody reputed to be another fighter or trouble-maker was a challenge. Once there was a famed rouge in the neighboring town of Banga by the name of Vicente Alba. Alba had also heard of Bugoy in Kalibo. Each now wanted to have a chance to fight the other.

They met during a fiesta in Banga. The Kalibo band was assisting and was marching down the street and Roman was beating the snare drum. Then Vicente came around and each suspected the other as his long morn foe. Bugoy struck first by beating Vicente's head with his drum stick.

They boxed and wrestled and rolled on the dust and down a muddy ditch until the cuadrilleros arrived to stop them. That's how they knew each other and that's the beginning of a long intimate friendship.

Bugoy hated persons in authority. One time when he was drunk, he beat the chief of police and it took four cuadrilleros to subdue him. They tied him with a rope and had a bamboo pole pass through his tied arms and legs hog-fashion to bring him to the municipal jail.

But Oma was very loving to his family. He had his moments of piety too. Sometime before his death, which came all too unexpectedly, he said to his wife, “lya, it is at my age when our Lord Jesus died. He was also thirty-three.”

Roman left behind nine small children. The youngest was five years old. He could have left them riches as he was the best tailor and drummer in town. But, no. He said his children might only quarrel over inheritance. They would have to sweat for their living if they had to survive. And so he drank and gambled.

== Entry into the Katipunan ==
When the Katipunan called for recruitment, Roman Bugoy enlisted into the society. He marched with the troops into Kalibo poblacion the day Del Castillo fell. When the forces disbanded, he was made to hide in a barrio in Lezo. But he clamored, “I do not know how to hide. I'd rather fight.” He was alone in hiding because his family stayed in Lezo poblacion.

The night news reached Lezo that the insurrectos from barrio, Liloan swooped down Malinao poblacion, four kilometers away from Lezo, and killed the présidente municipal, it was pandemonium in Lezo.

Without any strong male to depend on to protect the family in the face of the threatening danger of rebel raid from Malinao, Eulogia, Roman's wife, dragged her brood back to their home in Kalibo the following day, where situation under the Spanish authorities was still relatively peaceful.

== Surrender for Amnesty ==
Learning of the departure of his family to Kalibo, Roman left his hideout and went after them. But he stayed outside the poblacion in barrio Guba across the Aklan River. The next day, a bandillo announced Colonel Monet's amnesty urging the rebels to report and be pardoned.

Antonia, 16, accompanied by her little sister Irene, 7, both daughters of Roman, went to see. their father in Guba and tearfully persuaded him to come to town and present himself to the authorities. Roman reprimanded the children and told them to go back and tell their mother that he would not present himself as he had a hunch that the amnesty was just a ruse. At noon, Antonia again returned to her father, saying that it was the priest himself who gave the assurance in a church sermon of the sincere intention of the Spaniards, and that so many insurrectos in fact had already surrendered. Her effort was again in vain.

At 6:00 o’clock that afternoon, when Antonia went back the third time, Roman gave in to a tearful daughter's plea. He came to town and, with his wife and children, he reported dutifully at the municipal building. Since it was already evening, Roman was allowed to go home and was advised to report the following day to formalize his surrender. When they returned the following day, Roman was detained and his family sent home.

Hundreds of rebels who reported that day were detained. Suspected leaders of the uprising were picked out, segregated and confined at the Azarraga warehouse. Roman was among those detained, because the authorities had known him to be a perennial trouble-maker. It was enough reason.

They spent the night of March 21 as prisoners incommunicado. Their fate was sealed the following day in the connivance of the local leaders with the Spanish officials. At 4:00 o’clock in the afternoon they were herded to church and made to take confession. When they were brought back to the warehouse, Roman sent for his family. Eulogia and the children were barely allowed to see him. When they were finally permitted, Spanish marines who accompanied them rested a rifle at every shoulder of each child as they approached the prisoners‘ quarters.

Seeing his wife and children thus, the once stout-hearted fighter fell on his knees and broke down in tears. He clasped his youngest child, the petite Ana, but soon a Spanish marino told him to let go the child, and bade the family to depart.

== Death ==
Roman, as a parting word to his wife, said that it was bruited that they would be shipped to Capiz the following day where other prisoners had been brought. That was the last they saw of Roman alive. The following day when the nineteen dead were laid on the plaza before the tribunal, all red with their own blood, Irene, Roman's daughter, upon seeing the corpses, not knowing that her father was one of them, ran home and told her mother: "Inay, many camineros are lying down on the plaza. They are in their red uniform.”

== Legacy ==
The mortal remains of the 19 martyrs were relocated to a mausoleum in 1926 now known as Aklan Freedom Shrine or locally known as Castillo.

In order to commemorate the death anniversary of the Nineteen Martyrs of Aklan, Republic Act No. 7806 was made into law setting the 23rd day of March of every year as a special public holiday in the province of Aklan. A former general himself, President Fidel V. Ramos let Republic Act 7806 lapsed into law without his signature. And on September 1, 1994, in accordance with Article VI, Sec. 27(1) of the Constitution became law.

The street where they were massacred earlier known as Amadeo Street in Kalibo is now known as XIX Martyrs Street, in their honor.

His relatives in Kalibo named a building after him. The Ramon Aguirre Building is located in the corner of XIX Martyrs and Pastrana Streets, Kalibo.

On the 102nd martyrdom anniversary of the Nineteen Martyrs of Aklan on March 23, 2018, the National Historical Commission of the Philippines officially turned over to the Provincial Government of Aklan a tableau memorial in honor of the freedom heroes at the Goding Ramos Park.

== Published works ==
- Dela Cruz, Roman A. (1993) [1993]. Town of a Thousand (1st ed.). Kalibo, Aklan: Macar Publishing House. ISBN 971-9023-00-7.
