= Jose Fornier =

Filipino lawyer, diplomat and politician (1913-1979)

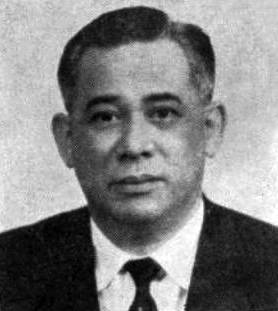
- Fornier in 1967

Member of the House of Representatives from Antique's lone district
- In office December 30, 1965 – December 30, 1969
- Preceded by: Tobias Fornier
- Succeeded by: Enrique A. Zaldívar

Personal details
- Born: December 10, 1913 Hamtic, Antique, Philippine Islands
- Died: August 9, 1979 (aged 65) Manila, Philippines
- Party: Nacionalista (1965–1979); Independent (until 1965)
- Spouse: Loda Xavier
- Children: 6
- Education: University of Manila (LL.B.)
- Occupation: Lawyer, diplomat, politician

Jose Abiera Fornier (December 10, 1913 – August 9, 1979) was a Filipino lawyer, diplomat and politician. He represented the lone district of Antique in the House of Representatives from 1965 to 1969.

== Early life and education ==
Fornier was born on December 10, 1913, in Hamtic, Antique, to Andres Zabala Fornier and Asuncion Abiera. He attended public schools in the Philippines, graduating from Antique High School in 1932. He then completed his law degree at the University of Manila and became a member of the Philippine Bar in 1949.

== Career ==
Fornier began his government service as a clerk in the municipal council in San Jose, Antique, in 1933. During World War II, he served as a justice of the peace of Caluya, Antique, under the free government. After the war, Fornier resigned from his position as a municipal councilor to become an assistant to the Philippine Mission to the United Nations. He was later appointed foreign affairs officer and vice consul at the Philippine Consulate General's Office in New York. Fornier also served as a consul in the Philippine Consulate in New Orleans , and was assigned to the Consulate General in Hong Kong and as consul in Macau.

Fornier returned to the Philippines in 1963 and was appointed associate commissioner of the Public Service Commission. He resigned from that post when he ran for representative in his home province of Antique. Fornier served as chairman of the committee on the codification of laws, vice-chairman of the committee on transportation and committee on ways and means, and a member of the committees on immigration, foreign affairs, and public works.

Fornier's political career was inspired by his late brother, Tobias Fornier, who served in the House of Representatives for four consecutive terms.

== Personal life ==
Fornier was married to Loda Valente Xavier from Culasi and has six children.

== Death ==
Fornier died on August 9, 1979, leaving a legacy of public service in both the diplomatic and political arenas.
