= Anini-y =

- Municipality
- Municipality of Anini-y
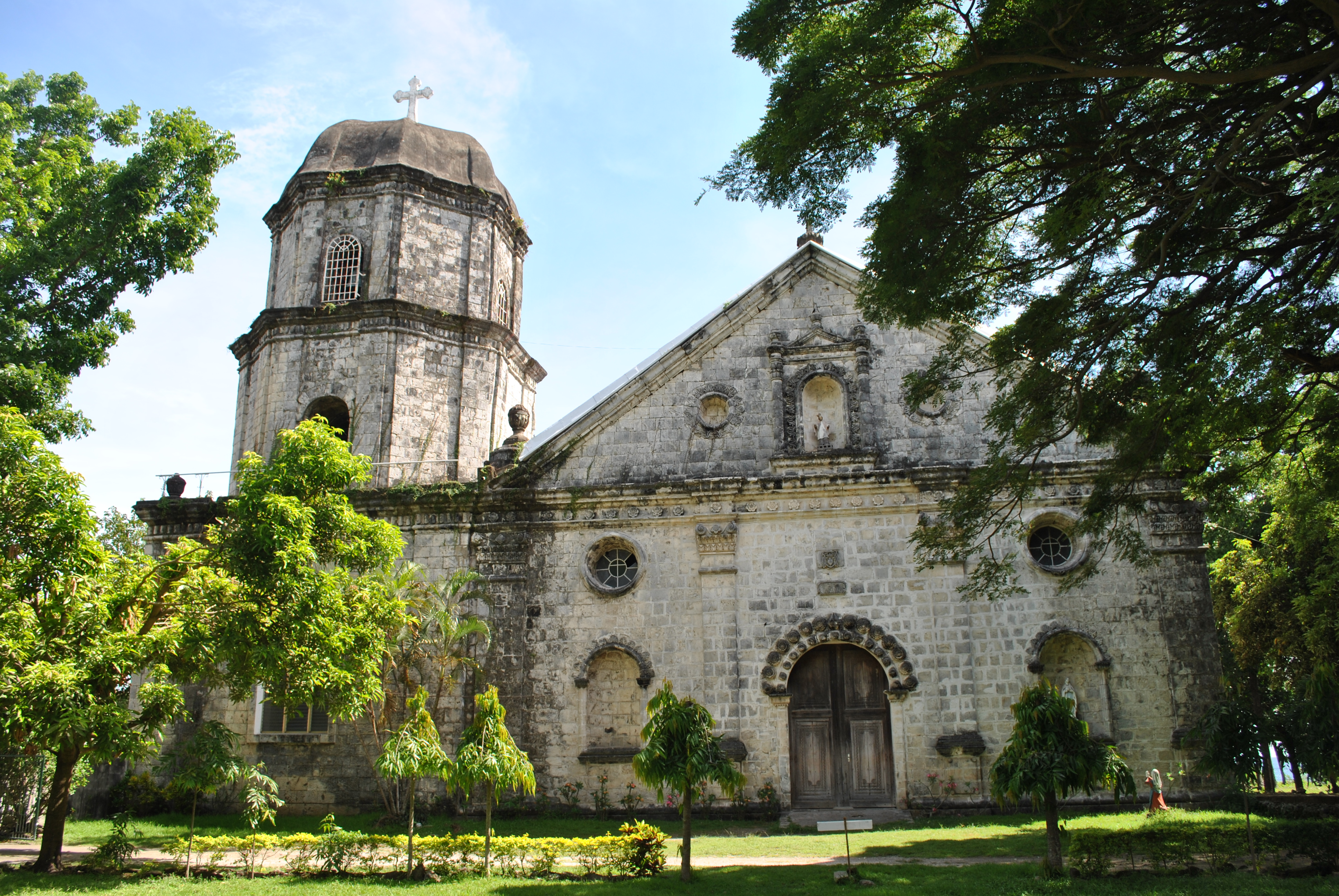
- Anini-y Church

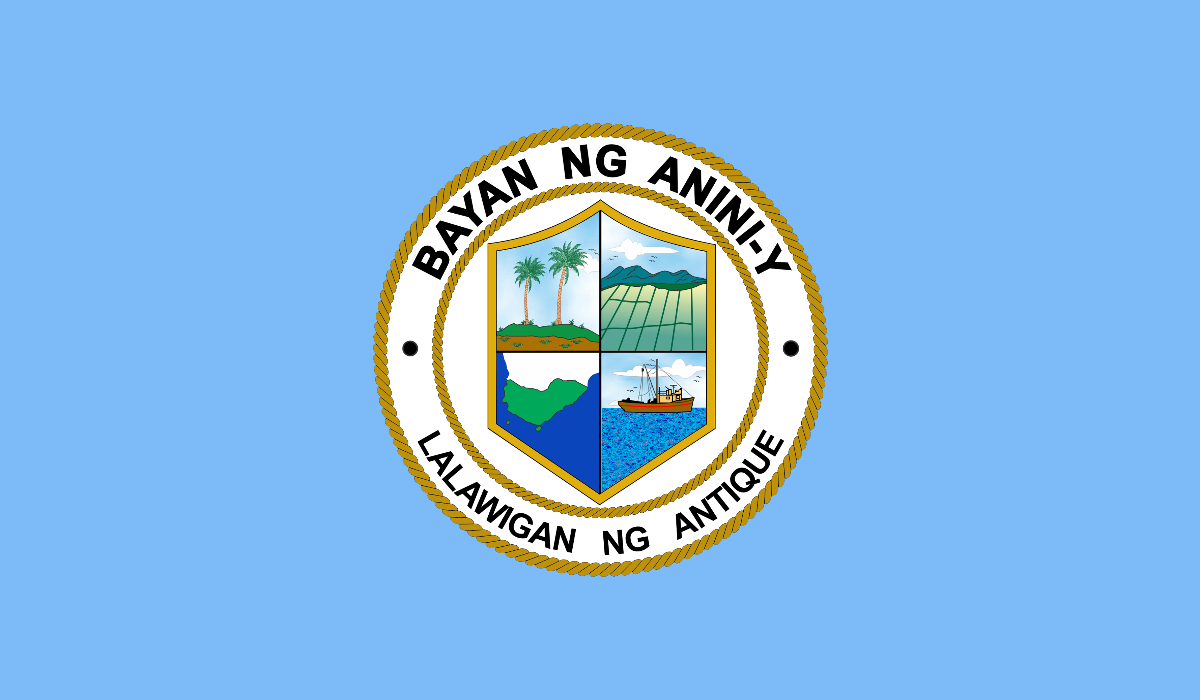
- Flag Seal
- Anthem: Anini-y, Banwang Pinili (unofficial)
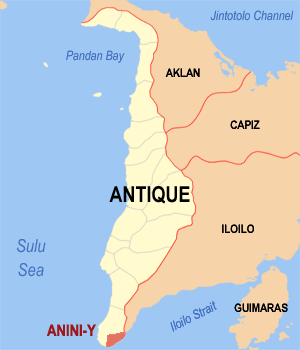
- Map of Antique with Anini-y highlighted
- Interactive map of Anini-y
- Location in the Philippines
- Coordinates: 10°25′57″N 121°55′31″E
- Country: Philippines
- Region: Western Visayas
- Province: Antique
- District: Lone district
- Barangays: 23 (see Barangays)

Government
  - Type: Sangguniang Bayan
  - Mayor: Maxfil B. Pollicar
  - Vice Mayor: Atty: Jorrey T. Sampior
  - Representative: Antonio Agapito "AA Legarda" Bautista Legarda Jr.
  - Municipal Council: Members: Glenn Hernaez; Micah Jeremy Hernaez; Mahal Pollicar; Arvin Salmite; Magdalena Cazeñas; Adviento Orlando Solis; Amalia Formarejo; Roger Gentica
  - Electorate: 14,388 voters (2025)

Area
  - Total: 66.17 km^{2} (25.55 sq mi)
- Elevation: 14 m (46 ft)
- Highest elevation (Mount Paluli-an): 404 m (1,325 ft)
- Lowest elevation: 0 m (0 ft)

Population (2024 census)
  - Total: 22,713
  - Density: 343.3/km^{2} (889.0/sq mi)
  - Households: 5,466

Economy
  - Income class: 4th municipal income class
  - Poverty incidence: 16.74% (2023)
  - Revenue: ₱ 134.4 million (2024)
  - Assets: ₱ 224.9 million (2024)
  - Expenditure: ₱ 51.33 million (2024)
  - Liabilities: ₱ 30.22 million (2024)

Service provider
  - Electricity: Antique Electric Cooperative (ANTECO)
- Time zone: UTC+8 (PST)
- ZIP code: 5717
- PSGC: 060601000
- IDD : area code: +63 (0)36
- Native languages: Karay-a; Ati; Hiligaynon; Tagalog
- Major religions: Roman Catholic, Iglesia Filipina Independiente
- Local feast: Urukay Festival
- Catholic diocese: Diocese of San Jose de Buenavista
- Patron saint: St. Joseph the Worker; St. John of Nepomuk; St. Theresa of Avila
- Website: aniniyantique.gov.ph

Anini-y, officially the Municipality of Anini-y (Kinaray-a: Banwa kang Anini-y; Hiligaynon: Banwa sang Anini-y; Tagalog: Bayan ng Anini-y), is a municipality in the province of Antique, Philippines. According to the 2024 census, it has a population of 22,713 people, making it 14th most populous municipality in the province of Antique.

== History ==
During the Spanish period, Anini-y was already an independent town, with a Baroque church situated at the center of its poblacin. During the American period, on October 23, 1903, it was merged with the municipality of Tobias Fornier (formerly Dao) under Philippine Commission Act No. 961, as part of a broader reorganization of local government units. On August 5, 1949, Anini-y regained its status as an independent municipality from Tobias Fornier through Executive Order No. 253 issued by President Elpidio Quirino.

== Geography ==
Anini-y is the southernmost municipality of the province and is 40 kilometres (25 mi) from the provincial capital, San Jose de Buenavista, and 85 kilometres (53 mi) from Iloilo City.

According to the Philippine Statistics Authority, the municipality has a land area of 66.17 square kilometres (25.55 sq mi) constituting 2.42% of the 2,729.17-square-kilometre- (1,053.74 sq mi) total area of Antique.

=== Climate ===
Climate data for Anini-y, Antique
Month	Jan	Feb	Mar	Apr	May	Jun	Jul	Aug	Sep	Oct	Nov	Dec	Year
Mean daily maximum °C (°F)	30 (86)	31 (88)	32 (90)	33 (91)	32 (90)	30 (86)	29 (84)	29 (84)	29 (84)	29 (84)	30 (86)	30 (86)	30 (87)
Mean daily minimum °C (°F)	21 (70)	21 (70)	22 (72)	23 (73)	25 (77)	25 (77)	25 (77)	25 (77)	24 (75)	24 (75)	23 (73)	22 (72)	23 (74)
Average precipitation mm (inches)	19 (0.7)	17 (0.7)	26 (1.0)	37 (1.5)	119 (4.7)	191 (7.5)	258 (10.2)	260 (10.2)	248 (9.8)	196 (7.7)	97 (3.8)	39 (1.5)	1,507 (59.3)
Average rainy days	7.2	5.2	8.3	11.9	22.3	26.5	28.3	28.2	27.3	26.4	18.7	11.8	222.1
Source: Meteoblue (Use with caution: this is modeled/calculated data, not measured locally.)

=== Barangays ===
Anini-y is politically subdivided into 23 barangays. Each barangay consists of puroks and some have sitios.

The barrio of San Ramón was formerly the sitio of Igdacoton in the barrio of Magdalena.

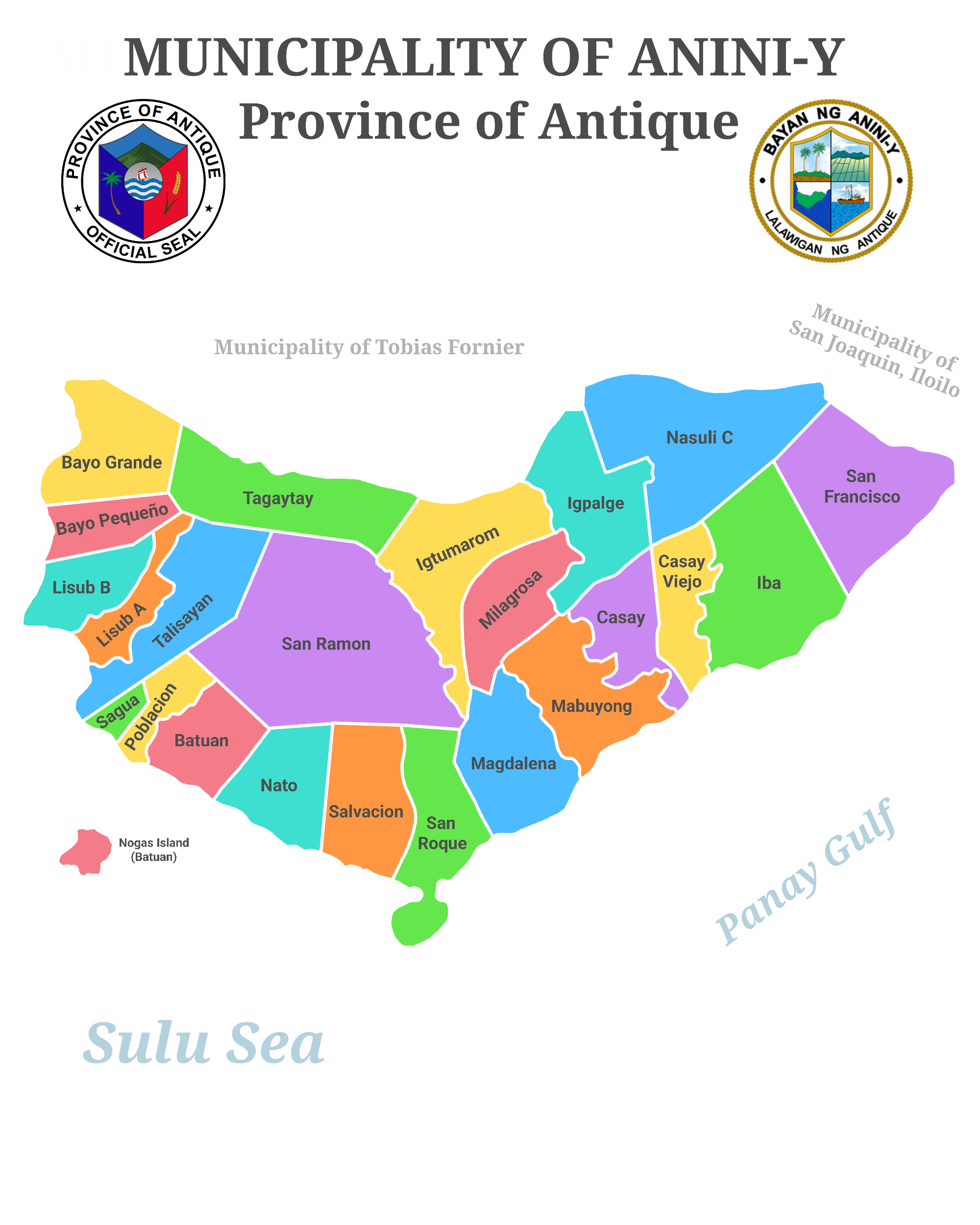
This map shows the barangays of the municipality of Anini-y in the province of Antique, Philippines.

PSGC	Barangay	Population			±% p.a.	
		2024		2010		
060601001	Bayo Grande	2.9%	670	655	▴	0.16%
060601002	Bayo Pequeño	2.6%	600	574	▴	0.31%
060601004	Butuan	6.0%	1,352	1,347	▴	0.03%
060601005	Casay, Anini-y	5.0%	1,134	1,176	▾	−0.25%
060601006	Casay Viejo	1.9%	421	374	▴	0.83%
060601007	Iba	4.9%	1,119	1,081	▴	0.24%
060601008	Milagrosa (Igbarabatuan)	1.6%	371	344	▴	0.53%
060601009	Igpalge	2.7%	612	632	▾	−0.22%
060601010	Igtumarom	1.9%	423	417	▴	0.10%
060601011	Lisub A	3.5%	801	868	▾	−0.56%
060601012	Lisub B	5.2%	1,184	896	▴	1.96%
060601013	Mabuyong	6.1%	1,385	1,361	▴	0.12%
060601014	Magdalena	9.5%	2,168	2,127	▴	0.13%
060601015	Nasuli C	2.8%	645	533	▴	1.34%
060601016	Nato	4.4%	999	963	▴	0.26%
060601017	Poblacion	3.5%	789	754	▴	0.32%
060601018	Sagua	5.1%	1,150	1,124	▴	0.16%
060601019	Salvacion	3.3%	750	736	▴	0.13%
060601020	San Francisco (Dapdap)	6.1%	1,378	1,363	▴	0.08%
060601021	San Ramon	1.6%	368	337	▴	0.61%
060601022	San Roque	5.6%	1,277	1,137	▴	0.81%
060601023	Tagaytay	1.2%	264	257	▴	0.19%
060601024	Talisayan	5.9%	1,341	1,293	▴	0.25%
	Total		22,713	20,349	▴	0.77%

== Demographics ==
Population census of Anini-y
Year	Pop.	±% p.a.
1903	4,541	—
1960	8,792	+1.17%
1970	11,590	+2.80%
1975	11,740	+0.26%
1980	13,480	+2.80%
1990	16,851	+2.26%
1995	18,657	+1.93%
2000	19,623	+1.09%
2007	20,097	+0.33%
2010	20,349	+0.45%
2015	21,201	+0.78%
2020	22,018	+0.80%
2024	22,713	+0.75%
Source: Philippine Statistics Authority

In the 2024 census, Anini-y had a population of 22,713 people. The population density was 340 inhabitants per square kilometre (880/sq mi).

== Economy ==
Poverty incidence of Anini-y

Source: Philippine Statistics Authority

== Tourism ==
- Cresta de Gallo — a mountain with a shape like a rooster's crown.
- Aliwliw - the highest mountain in Anini-y located along Anini-y and Tobias Fornier border.
- Iboc River and Nasuli River - two longest rivers in Anini-y
- Nogas Island — according to local legend, this Island was formed when the two lovers Anini and Nogas had broken their promises with the fairy God Mother. While riding on a boat near the town, their boat was capsized by big waves summoned by the fairy God Mother. After which, at the spot where Nogas and Anini were last seen, a white sand island full of mangroves appeared just near beside the Anini-y town.
- Siraan Hot Spring and Health Resort — People who reside near Siraan hot spring usually take their time relaxing in a bath tub sized pool early in the morning to feel the warmness and the cool breeze of the ocean as the resort is located just along the seashore.
- San Juan Nepomuceno Parish Church or Anini-y Church — built during the Spanish era in the 19th century. The church is made of coral reefs carved into thick blocks to form an adobe and were glued using thousands of egg whites/yolks. Early locals/settlers of the town were the prime workers and carpenters of the church. Some stories tell that people of the town were forced to contribute anything such as goods and food for the Spanish priest as well as raising chicken to lay more eggs so that it will be used for building of the church.
- Bantigue Marine Sanctuary — a marine reef and sanctuary situated on the western coast of Barangay San Francisco (Dapdap). This site is the future of local tourism of the barrio.

== Education ==
The Anini-y Schools District Office governs all educational institutions within the municipality. It oversees the management and operations of all private and public, from primary to secondary schools.

=== Primary and elementary schools ===
- Anini-y Central School
- Bayo-Crispin V. Unica Memorial School
- Casay Elementary School
- Gelacio Autajay Sr. Primary School (Salvacion Primary School)
- Iba Elementary School
- Igpalge Elementary School
- Igtumarom Elementary School
- Lisub Elementary School
- Magdalena Elementary School
- Milagrosa Elementary School
- Nasuli-C Elementary School
- Nato-Butuan Elementary School
- San Francisco Elementary School
- San Francisco Tree of Life International School
- San Ramon Elementary School
- San Roque-Ezpeleta Elementary School
- Silvino Qubing Memorial Elementary School (Mabuyong Elementary School)
- Tagaytay Elementary School
- Talisayan Elementary School

=== Secondary schools ===
- Igpalge National High School
- San Francisco Tree of Life International School
- San Roque-Ezpeleta National High School
- St. Andrew's High School
- St. Therese's High School
