= Leandro Fullon =

Filipino general and politician (1874-1904)

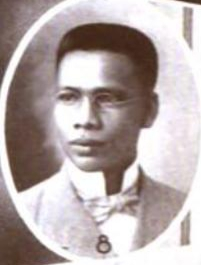
- Portrait as governor of Antique, published c. 1905, by the United States Bureau of the Census

Governor of Antique
- In office 1901–1904
- Preceded by: Major Holbrock
- Succeeded by: Angel Salazar, Sr.
- In office 1898
- Preceded by: Pedro Gella
- Succeeded by: Lt. Col. W. S. Scott

Personal details
- Born: March 13, 1874 Hamtic, Antique, Captaincy General of the Philippines
- Died: October 16, 1904 (aged 30) Hamtic, Antique, Philippine Islands
- Spouse: Petra Francisco
- Children: 5
- Occupation: Revolutionary, politician

Leandro Fullón y Locsín (March 13, 1874 – October 16, 1904) was a Philippine general and government administrator who fought against both the Spaniards during the Philippine Revolution and the United States invasion force during the Philippine-American War.

A member of the Katipunan, Fullón helped organize the first revolutionary government in the Philippines. He led the expeditionary forces to Panay and later established a Revolutionary Provincial Government in Antique. Fullón later became the first Filipino Governor of the Province of Antique from 1901 to 1904.

== Early life and education ==
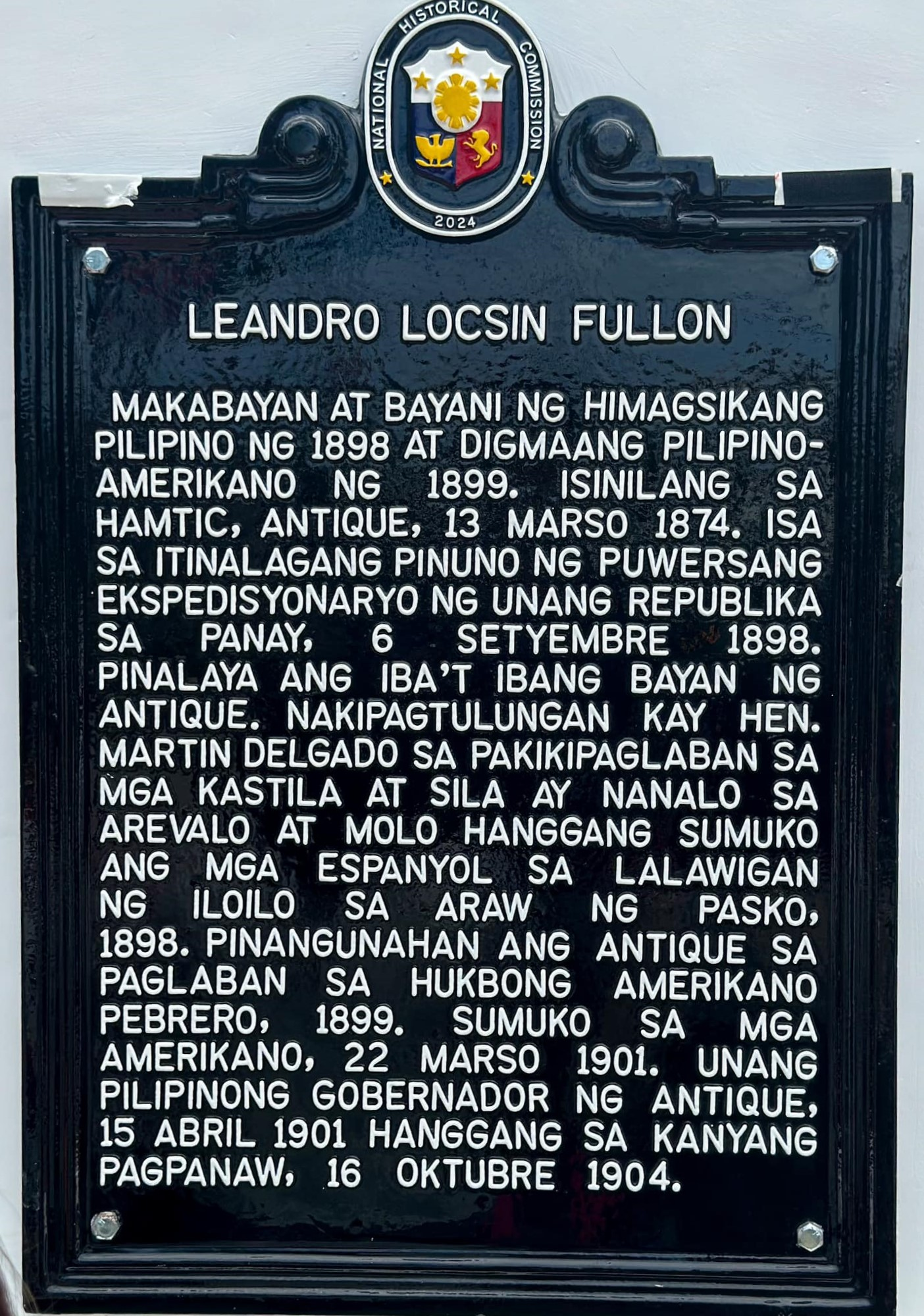
National historical marker installed in 2024 at Fullon's monument at the town plaza of Hamtic

Leandro Fullón was born on March 13, 1874, to Justo Guerrero Fullon and Fausta Gerona Locsin in Hamtic, Antique. He studied at Ateneo Municipal de Manila before transferring to Colegio de San Juan de Letran in Manila in 1896.

== Personal life ==
At age 22, Fullon married Petra Francisco, daughter of Evaristo Francisco and Margarita Dairo, a prominent family from Binondo, Manila.

== War with Spain ==
On September 6, 1898, Fullón, now a general in the Philippine forces, was assigned by General Emilio Aguinaldo and returned to Antique with 140 officers and 350 men under his command. After arriving in Antique on September 21, many local volunteers joined his forces.

Fullón established a revolutionary government in Pandan and Culasi . On Nov. 22, 1898, Fullón's forces captured San Jose de Buenavista. He formed a Revolutionary Provincial Government with Ángel Salazar (Governor), Santos Capadocia (Vice Governor), Anacleto Villavert Jiménez and José Gontanilla (Council of Justice), Anselmo Alicante (Council of Internal Revenue) and Vicente Gella (Representative to Malolos Congress).

Fullón's forces fought the Spanish in San Miguel, Pavia and outside Jaro in Iloilo City. The new revolutionary government in Visayas later appointed Fullón as Politico-Military Governor of Antique.

== War with the United States ==
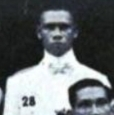
Fullon as governor of Antique, published c. 1905, by the Bureau of Insular Affairs

On December 10, 1898, Spain ceded the Philippines to the United States to end the Spanish-American War. When U.S. forces entered Iloilo on February 11, 1899, Fullón joined in the resistance. In early 1900, he returned to Antique to continue fighting. On March 22, 1901, Fullón and the other resistance fighter were forced to surrender.

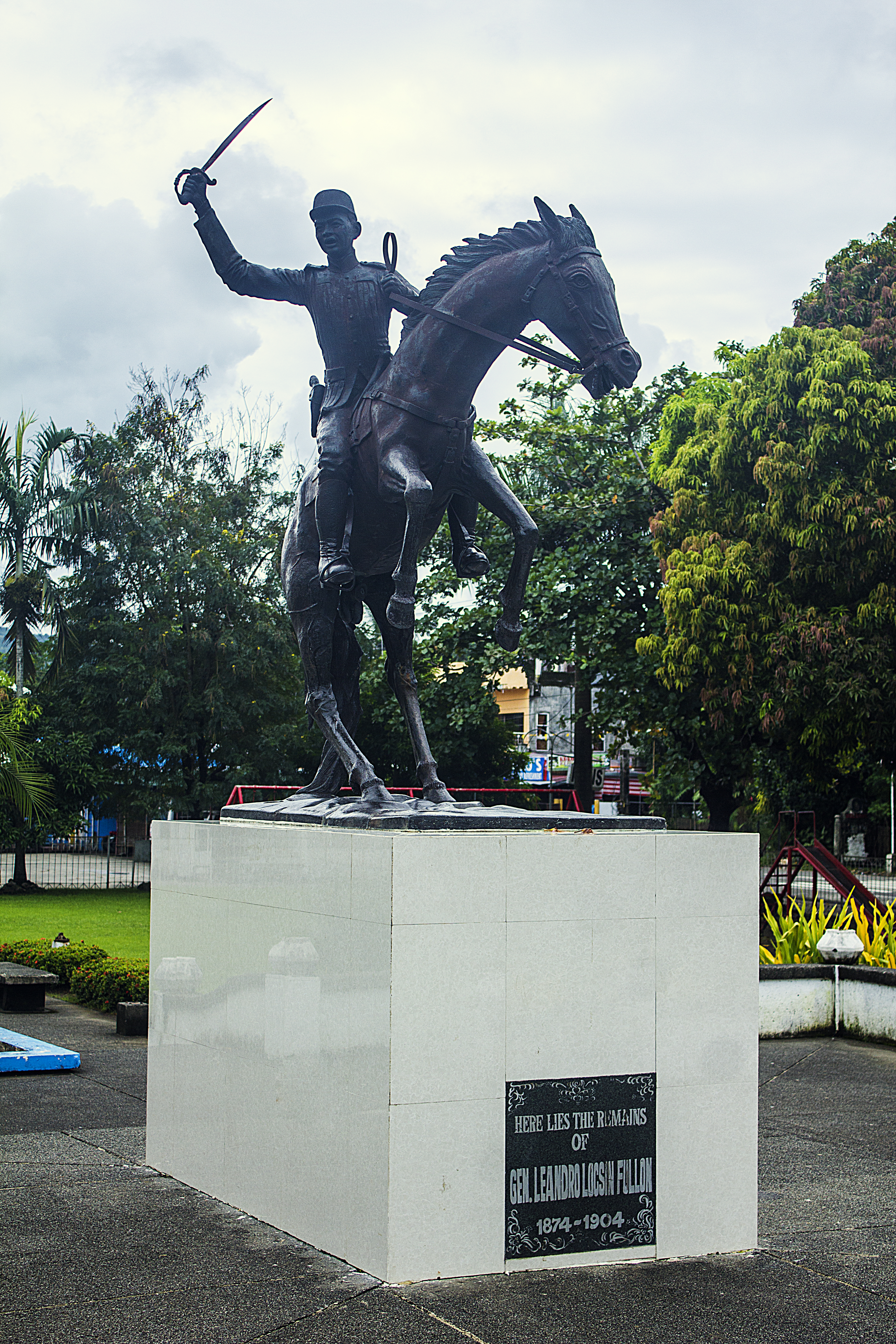
The General Leandro Fullon National Shrine in Fullon's birthplace at Hamtic, Antique, wherein his remains were laid to rest. The shrine is owned by the National Historical Commission of the Philippines.

On April 15, 1901, the American authorities appointed Fullón Provincial Governor of Antique. He held that position until his death on Oct. 16, 1904, aged 30. During his governorship, the province was severely affected by the 1902 cholera epidemic and the rising religious tensions between the Aglipayans and Roman Catholics. Fullon also revealed that the consolidation of the municipalities under the province were not well-received by the majority of pueblo officials.

The financial condition of the province was seriously affected by a series of calamities which destroyed nearly all agriculture since 1901. During the year 1903 the cholera epidemic and fevers made their appearance in the month of May and were at their height during the season of sowing, for which reason less than one-half of the plantations was set out...

— Leandro Fullon, Annual Report of the Governor of the Province of Antique (July 15, 1904)
