= Jacques Fornier =

French theatrical actor and director (1926–2020)

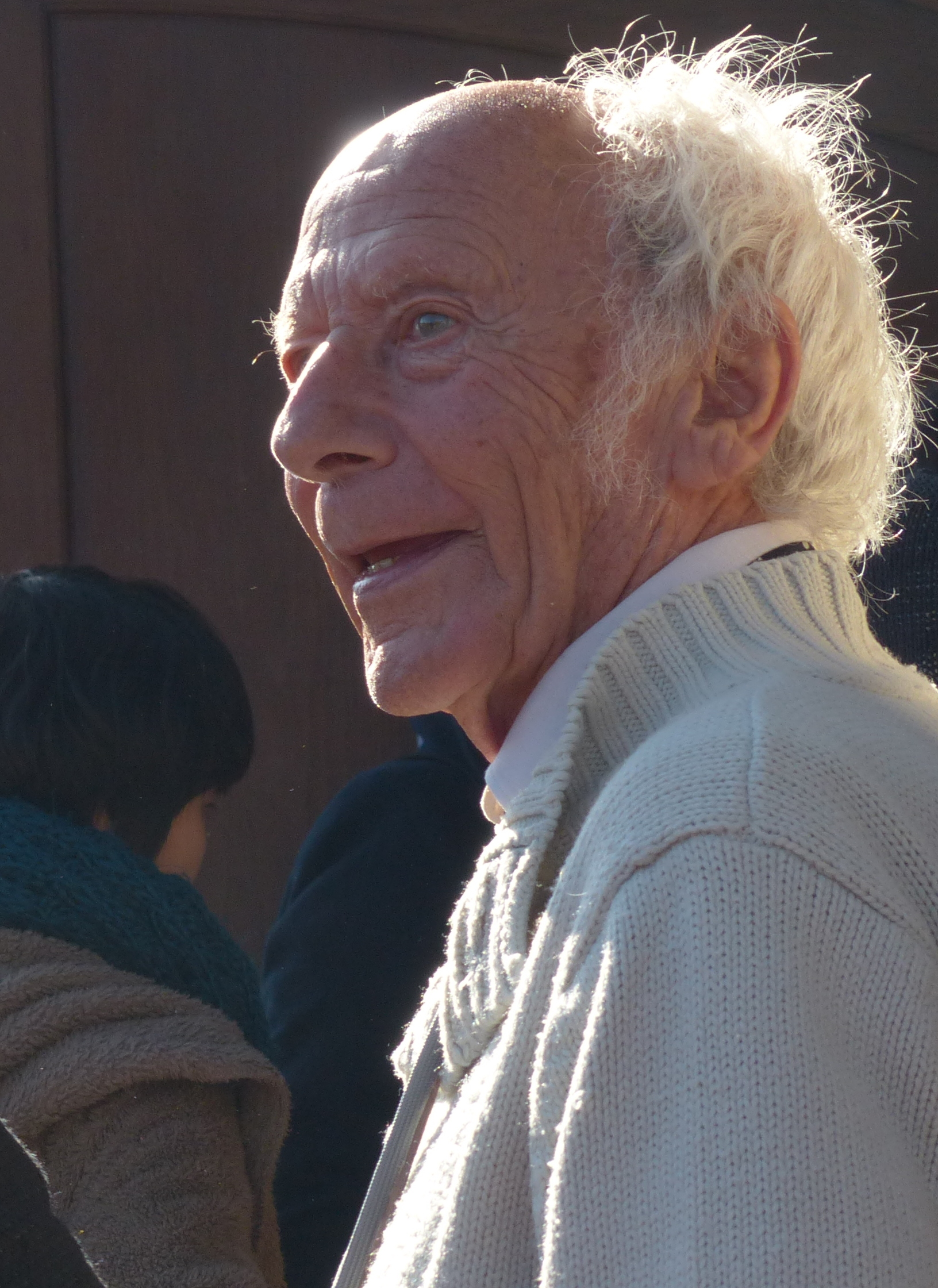
- Born: 6 November 1926; Paris, France
- Died: 14 November 2020 (aged 94)
- Occupations: Actor; Director

Jacques Fornier (6 November 1926 – 14 November 2020) was a French theatrical actor and director. He founded the Théâtre de Bourgogne and led it for 15 years. He also directed the National Theatre of Strasbourg. Since 1985, the show Salle Jacques Fornier has been shown in Dijon.

== Biography ==
Fornier started his career in Paris before moving to Beaune in Burgundy. In 1956, he founded the Troupe de Bourgogne, which featured 11 actors, including Roland Bertin. In 1959, the French Government began to fund the troupe, which would become the Centre dramatique national. In 1971, he became the Director of the National Theatre of Strasbourg, a position he held for one year.

Jacques Fornier died on 14 November 2020 at the age of 94.

== Staging ==
- Le Légetaire universel (1957)
- Les Deux Ogres (1958)
- Le Médecin malgré lui (1959)
- The Barber of Seville (1959)
- Le Mariage forcé (1960)
- La Fausse Suivante (1960)
- Barberine (1960)
- La Fontaine aux saints (1960)
- The Miser (1961)
- Julius Caesar (1962)
- Éduoard et Agrippine (1963)
- La Manivelle (1964)
- La Folle Journée (1967)
- La Mort joyeuse
- The Bear
- Feu la mère de Madame
- Soledad
- No Exit
- Scapin the Schemer
- The Mandrake
- On ne badine pas avec l'amour
- Le Déluge
- Creditors
- Turcaret
- Phèdre~Epilogue (2011)

== Acting ==
- La Tragédie du roi Christophe (1997)
- Aberrations du documentaliste (1998-1999)
- La Porte d'harmonie (1999)
- Phèdre (2001-2003)
- Micromégas (2003)
- Aberrations du documentaliste (2006)
- La Confrérie des farceurs (2007)
- Britannicus (2008)
- Aberrations du documentaliste (2009)

== Filmography ==
=== Cinema ===
- Je suis un no man's land (2011)

=== Television ===
- Kir, la légende et son double (2012)

== Awards ==
- Commander of the Ordre des Arts et des Lettres (1993)
