= Kiangan National Shrine =

WWII memorial in Ifugao, Philippines

- Bantayog sa Kiangan
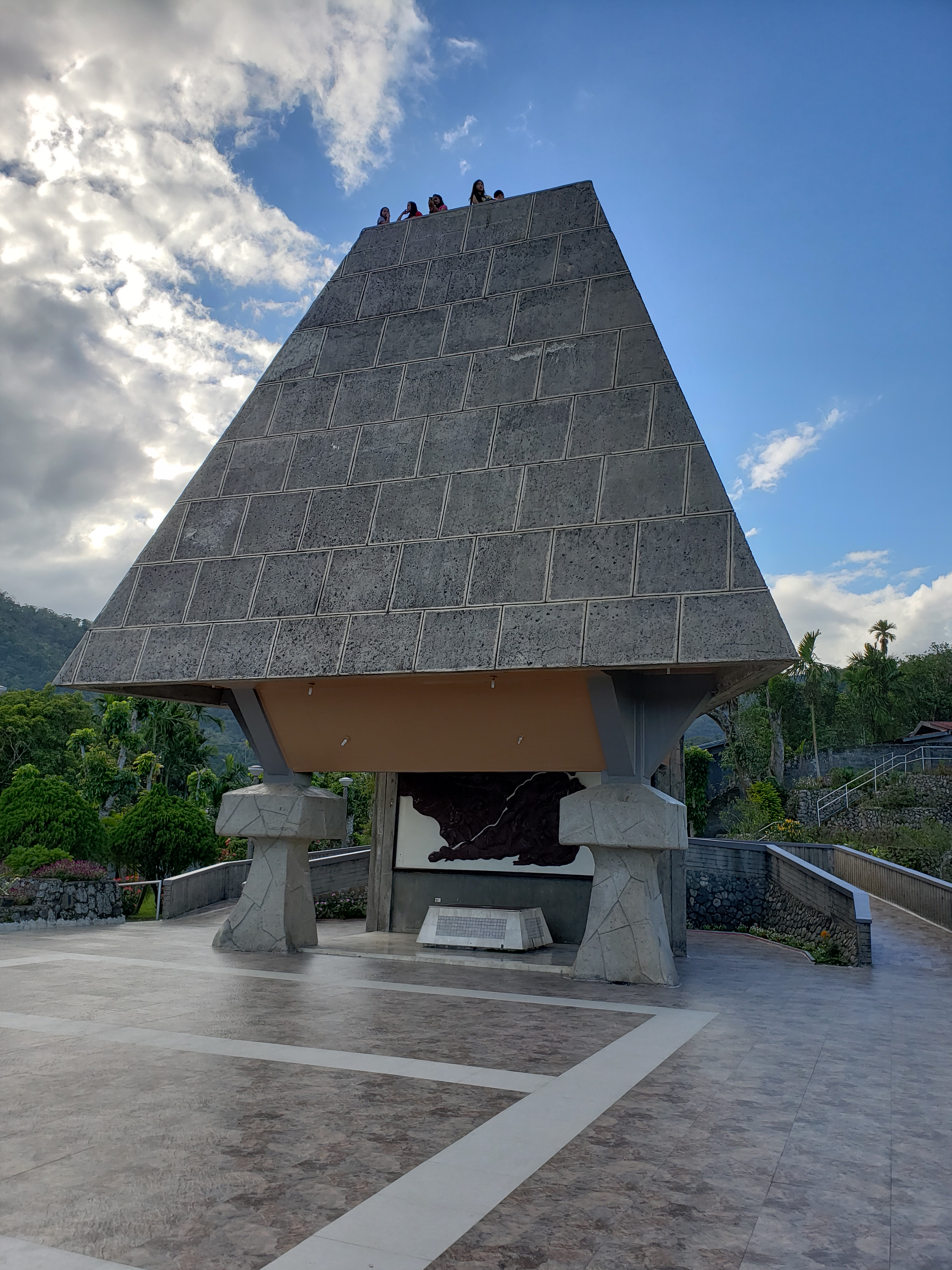
- Location: Kiangan, Ifugao, Philippines
- Coordinates: 16°46′46″N 121°04′53″E
- Material: Concrete, steel
- Completion date: 1974
- Dedicated date: 1975
- Dedicated to: Surrender of General Tomoyuki Yamashita; World War II Allied veterans

The Kiangan National Shrine (Filipino: Bantayog sa Kiangan) also known as the Yamashita Shrine is a war memorial in Kiangan, Ifugao, Philippines. It commemorates the surrender of the top commander of Japanese Imperial Army in the Philippines General Tomoyuki Yamashita to the Allied forces, which led to the end of the Japanese occupation of the archipelago during World War II.

== History ==
The Philippine Tourism Authority built a memorial in Linda in the town of Kiangan in Ifugao province in 1974 at the site where the highest ranking Imperial Japanese military leader General Tomoyuki Yamashita surrendered to Allied forces, which consisted of primarily Filipino and American soldiers.

The site has been declared as a National Landmark by the National Historical Commission. On July 9, 1975, then-President Ferdinand Marcos issued Proclamation No. 1460 declaring the site as a military shrine under the administration of the Military Memorial Division of the Philippine Veterans Affairs Office (PVAO), an agency under the Department of National Defense. The PVAO took over the operations and administration of the shrine on October 16, 1975.

== Monument ==
The shrine is made of concrete and steel and its form drew inspiration from native Ifugao houses.
