= Nineteen Martyrs of Aklan =

Group of Filipinos executed in 1897

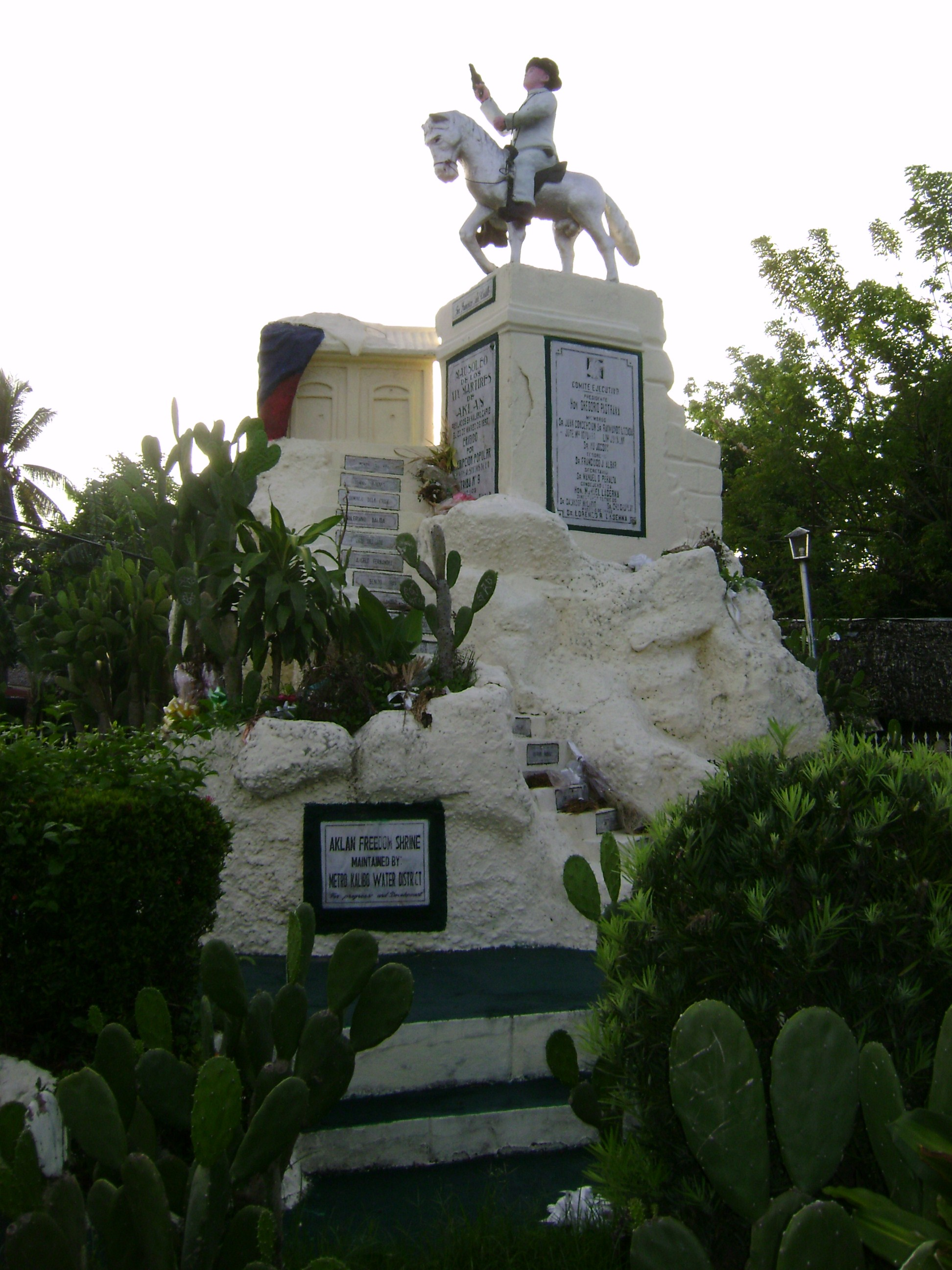
Aklan Freedom Shrine

The Nineteen Martyrs of Capiz, more commonly known anachronistically as the Nineteen Martyrs of Aklan (Note: Aklan as a province did not exist at the time of the individuals' death) refers to a group of Filipino revolutionaries in Panay who were executed for advancing the cause of the Katipunan during the Philippine Revolution against Spain. All individuals were native to towns in Capiz, which are now in the modern province of Aklan.

== Background ==
Former Filipino migrant workers Francisco del Castillo and Candido Iban won a lottery while there were in Australia. They returned to Manila in the Philippines in 1894 or 1895 to join the Katipunan, a revolutionary group seeking independence of the Philippines from Spain. They donated part of their winnings to help fund the printing press that would be used for the publication of Kalayaan, the Katipunan's newspaper. The first issue was released in March 1896.

The two were later directed by Andres Bonifacio to establish a chapter of the Katipunan in the Visayas. Del Castillo died in a fight on March 17, 1897, which led to the increase of pro-revolution sentiment in Capiz (in an area which now forms part of modern-day Aklan). The remaining revolutionaries were promised of amnesty by the Spanish colonial government but were imprisoned and tortured instead. They were executed on March 23, 1897.

== Martyrs ==
The Nineteen Martyrs of Aklan consists of natives of the modern-day Aklan province; eleven hailed from Kalibo, three from Malinao, five from Lagatik (now New Washington).

- Roman Aguirre
- Tomas Briones
- Valeriano Dalida
- Domingo de la Cruz
- Claro Delgado
- Ángelo Fernández
- Benito Iban
- Candido Iban
- Simeon Inocencio
- Isidro Jimenez
- Catalino Mangat
- Lamberto Mangat
- Valeriano Masinda
- Maximo Mationg
- Simplicio Reyes
- Canuto Segovia
- Gavino Sucgang
- Francisco Villorente
- Gavino Yunsal

== Legacy ==
The nineteen martyrs are commemorated annually every March in the Kalibo in the modern-day province of Aklan. The Aklan Freedom Shrine was built in the town in their honor.

The martyrs were subject of a 2019 full-length documentary film titled Daan Patungong Tawaya (lit. 'Road to Paradise'). In the film, the martyrs were portrayed as having been empowered by anting-anting.

== See also ==
- Thirteen Martyrs of Cavite
- Thirteen Martyrs of Bagumbayan
- Fifteen Martyrs of Bicol
