= Aklan Freedom Shrine =

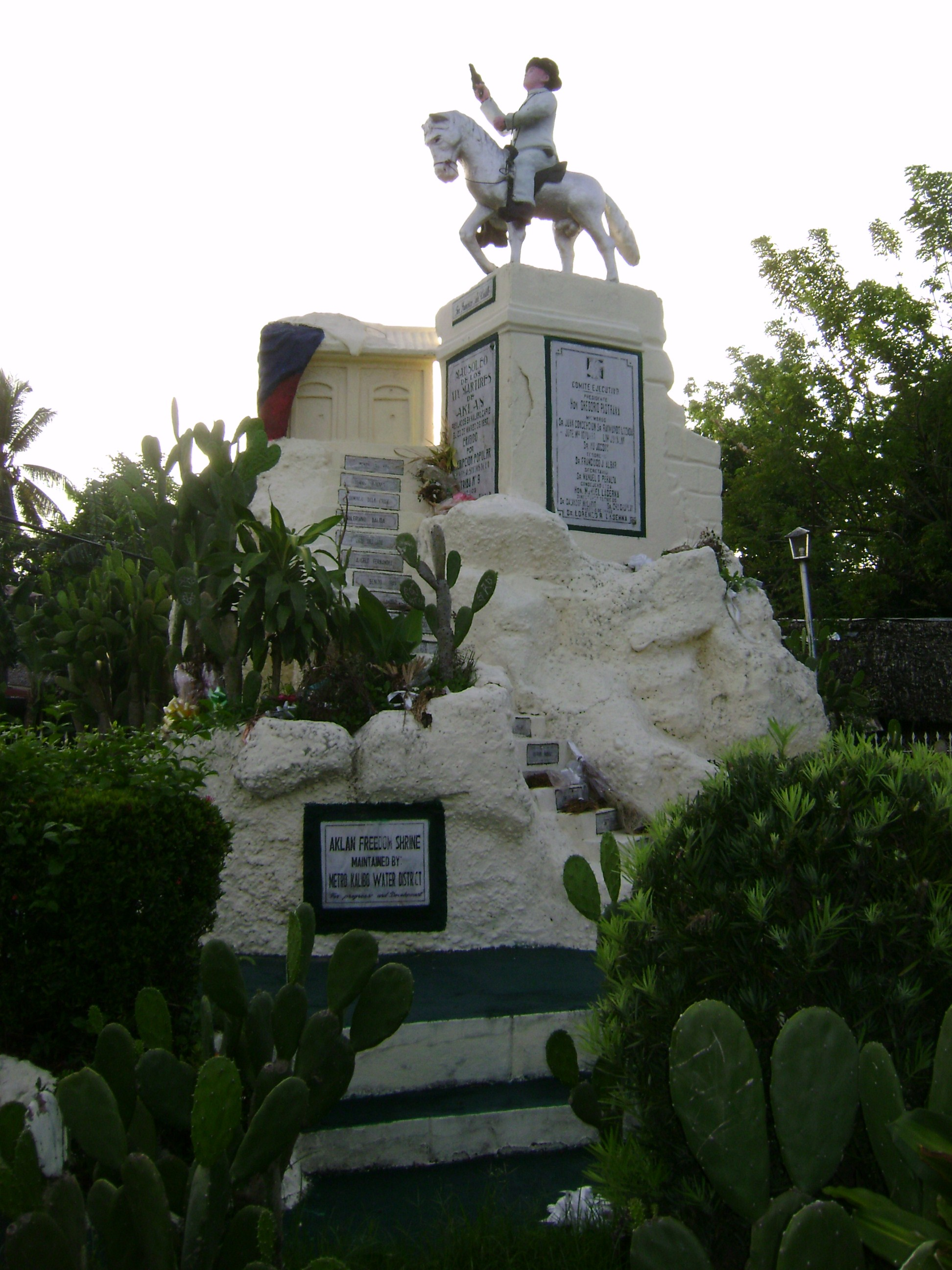
- The monument in 2008
- Interactive map of Aklan Freedom Shrine
- Location: Kalibo, Aklan, Philippines
- Coordinates: 11°42′18″N 122°21′53″E
- Type: Mausoleum
- Dedicated to: Nineteen Martyrs of Aklan

Aklan Freedom Shrine is a monument and mausoleum in Kalibo, Aklan, Philippines. It is recognized as a National Historical Shrine since 2019.

== Monument ==
The Aklan Freedom Shrine features a monument with a 19-step stairs with each step dedicated to the individuals who comprise the Nineteen Martyrs of Aklan. On top of the structure is a sculpture of the group's leader Francisco Del Castillo, the leader of the Katipunan revolutionaries in Capiz (modern day Aklan).

The remains of the martyrs were buried elsewhere before they were exhumed and re-interred on the site of what is now the Aklan Freedom Shrine.

== Heritage status ==
In 2019, the Sangguniang Bayan of Kalibo issued a resolution asking the National Historical Commission of the Philippines (NHCP) to recognize the site as a National Historical Shrine. The NHCP recognized the site as such on April 25, 2019.
