= Tobias Fornier =

Filipino lawyer and politician (1902–1964)

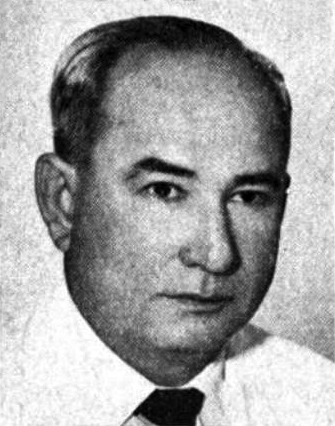
- Fornier's official portrait during the 3rd Congress

Member of the Philippine House of Representatives for Antique's at-large district
- In office December 30, 1949 – October 31, 1964
- Preceded by: Emigdio Nietes
- Succeeded by: Jose Fornier

Member of the National Assembly of the Philippines for Antique's at-large district
- In office September 25, 1943 – February 2, 1944 Serving with Alberto A. Villavert
- Period: Second Republic
- Preceded by: District re-created
- Succeeded by: District abolished (seat later held by Emigdio Nietes in 1945)

Governor of Antique
- In office 1940–1947
- Preceded by: Alberto A. Villavert
- Succeeded by: Alberto A. Villavert

Personal details
- Born: Tobias Abiera Fornier; September 6, 1902 Dao, Antique, Philippine Islands
- Died: October 31, 1964 (aged 62) New York, U.S.
- Party: Nacionalista (1940–1943; 1945–1964)
- Other political affiliations: KALIBAPI (1943–1945)
- Spouse: Encarnacion Villavert
- Relatives: Jose Fornier (brother)
- Nickname: Tobing

Tobias "Tobing" Abiera Fornier (September 6, 1902 – October 31, 1964) was a Filipino lawyer and politician who served as a member of the Philippine House of Representatives for Antique's at-large congressional district from 1949 until his death in 1964. He previously served in the National Assembly during the Second Republic, representing the same district from 1943 to 1944, and as governor of Antique from 1940 to 1947. The municipality of Dao in Antique was renamed in his honor in 1978.

== Early life and education ==
Fornier was born on September 6, 1902, in Dao, Antique, to Andres Fornier and Asuncion Abiera. He went to the University of Manila and later the Philippine Law School for college, where he earned his Associate in Arts and Bachelor of Laws degrees, respectively. After passing the Bar examinations, he immediately began practicing law.

== Political career ==
From 1940 to 1947, Fornier served as the governor of Antique, during which time he also served as an ex-officio member of the National Assembly during the Second Republic, representing Antique's at-large district from 1943 to 1944. He was later elected to the House of Representatives for the same seat in 1949, and was reelected three times, in 1953, 1957, and 1961. During the 3rd Congress, Fornier chaired the powerful House Committee on Appropriations.

== Personal life, death, and legacy ==
Fornier was not able to finish his fourth successive congressional term after he died in office on October 31, 1964, in New York, while undergoing medical treatment for liver illness. He was succeeded by his younger brother Jose Fornier, who was elected in 1965.

He was married to Encarnacion Villavert, who would later become the first female governor of Antique in 1963.

The municipality of Dao in Antique was renamed in his honor in 1978 by virtue of Batas Pambansa Blg. 10.

House of Representatives of the Philippines
Preceded by Emigdio Nietes	Member of the Philippine House of Representatives for Antique's at-large district 1949–1964	Succeeded by Jose Fornier
New district	Member of the National Assembly of the Philippines for Antique's at-large district 1943–1944; With: Alberto A. Villavert	Vacant Dissolution of the Second Republic Title next held by Emigdio Nietes (in the House of Representatives)
Political offices
Previous: Alberto A. Villavert	Governor of Antique; 1940–1947	Succeeded by Alberto A. Villavert
