= Tobias Fornier, Antique =

Municipality in Antique, Philippines

Tobias Fornier Dao
- Municipality
- Municipality of Tobias Fornier
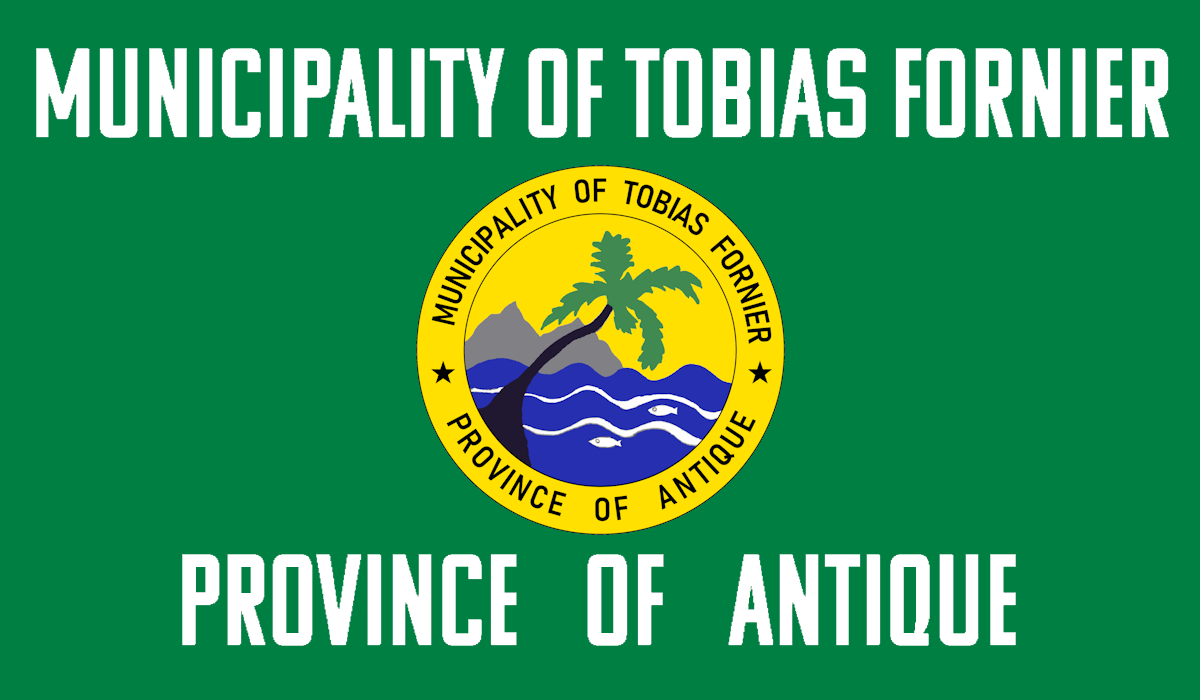
- Flag

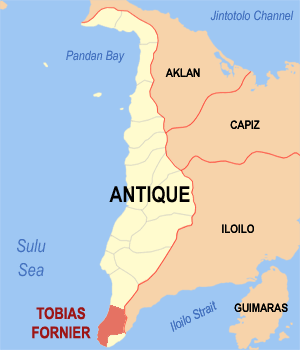
- Map of Antique with Tobias Fornier highlighted
- Interactive map of Tobias Fornier
- Location within the Philippines
- Coordinates: 10°31′04″N 121°56′42″E
- Country: Philippines
- Region: Western Visayas
- Province: Antique
- District: Lone district
- Founded: 1978
- Named for: Tobias Abiera Fornier
- Barangays: 50 (see Barangays)

Government
  - Type: Sangguniang Bayan
  - Mayor: Ernesto O. Tajanlait III (Note: The Court of Appeals reversed the Ombudsman’s his suspension of Antique town mayor)
  - Vice Mayor: Cezar Tajanlangit
  - Representative: Anthony Agapito B. Legarda Jr.
  - Municipal Council: Members: Rene S. Magdaong; Marlo C. Macabanti; Dindi John D. Lignig; Rolando C. Magos Jr.; Tessie H. Asenjo; Melvin C. Flor; Eileen C. Macadangdang; Maria Orchid P. Fornier
  - Electorate: 19,752 voters (2025)

Area
  - Total: 112.12 km^{2} (43.29 sq mi)
- Highest elevation: 374 m (1,227 ft)
- Lowest elevation: 0 m (0 ft)

Population (2024 census)
  - Total: 34,411
  - Density: 306.91/km^{2} (794.90/sq mi)
  - Households: 8,148

Economy
  - Income class: 3rd municipal income class
  - Poverty incidence: 20.18% (2023)
  - Revenue: ₱ 167 million (2024)
  - Assets: ₱ 440.2 million (2024)
  - Expenditure: ₱ 81.73 million (2024)
  - Liabilities: ₱ 85.46 million (2024)

Service provider
  - Electricity: Antique Electric Cooperative (ANTECO)
- Time zone: UTC+8 (PST)
- ZIP code: 5716
- PSGC: 060607000
- IDD : area code: +63 (0)36
- Native languages: Karay-a; Ati; Hiligaynon; Tagalog
- Website: tobiasfornier.gov.ph

Tobias Fornier, officially the Municipality of Tobias Fornier, (Kinaray-a: Banwa kang Tobias Fornier; Hiligaynon: Banwa sang Tobias Fornier; Tagalog: Bayan ng Tobias Fornier), is a municipality in the province of Antique, Philippines. According to the 2024 census, it has a population of 34,411 people.

== History ==
The municipality of Tobias Fornier was formerly known as Dao until 1978 when it was given its current name by virtue of Batas Pambansa Blg. 10. It is named after a Congressman from Antique, Tobias Abiera Fornier (1902–October 31, 1964). The 1818 Spanish census then recorded 1,296 native families in the area, living in harmony with 7 Spanish-Filipino families.

In 1957, a barrio named Barasanan was renamed to Ballescas. In the same year, barrio Taguimtim was renamed to Pacienca.

== Geography ==
Tobias Fornier is located at 10°31′04″N 121°56′42″E. It is 28 kilometres (17 mi) from the provincial capital, San Jose de Buenavista.

According to the Philippine Statistics Authority, the municipality has a land area of 112.12 square kilometres (43.29 sq mi) constituting 4.11% of the 2,729.17-square-kilometre- (1,053.74 sq mi) total area of Antique.

=== Barangays ===
Tobias Fornier is politically subdivided into 50 barangays. Each barangay consists of puroks and some have sitios.

PSGC	Barangay	Population			±% p.a.	
		2024		2010		
060607001	Abaca	5.5%	1,888	1,817	▴	0.27%
060607002	Aras-Asan	3.3%	1,120	924	▴	1.34%
060607003	Arobo	1.6%	556	524	▴	0.41%
060607004	Atabay	2.6%	892	784	▴	0.90%
060607005	Atiotes	1.4%	481	455	▴	0.39%
060607006	Bagumbayan	1.5%	506	442	▴	0.94%
060607007	Ballescas	1.5%	523	483	▴	0.55%
060607008	Balud	1.6%	565	704	▾	−1.51%
060607009	Barasanan A	1.9%	659	579	▴	0.90%
060607010	Barasanan B	1.5%	512	501	▴	0.15%
060607011	Barasanan C	0.9%	301	281	▴	0.48%
060607012	Bariri	0.5%	179	170	▴	0.36%
060607013	Camandagan	1.5%	515	481	▴	0.48%
060607014	Cato-ogan	3.4%	1,174	1,097	▴	0.47%
060607015	Danawan	1.8%	612	490	▴	1.55%
060607016	Diclum	2.1%	711	664	▴	0.48%
060607017	Fatima	3.8%	1,295	1,257	▴	0.21%
060607018	Gamad (Igdamacio)	1.4%	490	478	▴	0.17%
060607019	Igbalogo	1.4%	493	490	▴	0.04%
060607020	Igbangcal-A	1.4%	475	471	▴	0.06%
060607021	Igbangcal-B	1.7%	577	444	▴	1.84%
060607022	Igbangcal-C	0.9%	320	313	▴	0.15%
060607023	Igcabuad	0.7%	243	171	▴	2.47%
060607049	Igcadac	1.3%	456	419	▴	0.59%
060607024	Igcado	2.7%	941	838	▴	0.81%
060607025	Igcalawagan	1.5%	520	437	▴	1.21%
060607026	Igcapuyas	0.6%	200	179	▴	0.77%
060607027	Igcasicad (San Pedro)	0.7%	239	228	▴	0.33%
060607028	Igdalaguit	4.2%	1,445	1,250	▴	1.01%
060607029	Igdanlog	2.5%	872	843	▴	0.24%
060607030	Igdurarog	1.6%	553	423	▴	1.88%
060607031	Igtugas	1.2%	410	384	▴	0.46%
060607032	Lawigan	0.8%	275	270	▴	0.13%
060607050	Lindero	1.1%	385	341	▴	0.85%
060607033	Manaling (Cata-an)	0.8%	287	264	▴	0.58%
060607034	Masayo	3.3%	1,124	1,247	▾	−0.72%
060607035	Nagsubuan	0.8%	272	261	▴	0.29%
060607042	Nasuli-A (San Ramon)	2.4%	818	894	▾	−0.61%
060607041	Opsan (San Jose)	1.8%	624	591	▴	0.38%
060607036	Paciencia	3.2%	1,099	914	▴	1.29%
060607037	Poblacion Norte	4.9%	1,683	1,611	▴	0.30%
060607038	Poblacion Sur	3.9%	1,352	1,298	▴	0.28%
060607039	Portillo	0.6%	212	203	▴	0.30%
060607040	Quezon	1.0%	338	301	▴	0.81%
060607043	Samalague (Santa Maria)	1.1%	395	332	▴	1.21%
060607044	Santo Tomas	2.1%	725	532	▴	2.17%
060607045	Tacbuyan	0.6%	204	185	▴	0.68%
060607046	Tene	1.0%	334	339	▾	−0.10%
060607047	Villaflor	4.3%	1,480	1,445	▴	0.17%
060607048	Ysulat	2.1%	716	620	▴	1.00%
	Total		34,411	30,669	▴	0.80%

=== Climate ===
Climate data for Tobias Fornier, Antique
Month	Jan	Feb	Mar	Apr	May	Jun	Jul	Aug	Sep	Oct	Nov	Dec	Year
Mean daily maximum °C (°F)	30 (86)	31 (88)	32 (90)	33 (91)	32 (90)	30 (86)	29 (84)	28 (82)	28 (82)	29 (84)	30 (86)	30 (86)	30 (86)
Mean daily minimum °C (°F)	21 (70)	21 (70)	22 (72)	23 (73)	25 (77)	25 (77)	24 (75)	24 (75)	24 (75)	24 (75)	23 (73)	22 (72)	23 (74)
Average precipitation mm (inches)	19 (0.7)	17 (0.7)	26 (1.0)	37 (1.5)	119 (4.7)	191 (7.5)	258 (10.2)	260 (10.2)	248 (9.8)	196 (7.7)	97 (3.8)	39 (1.5)	1,507 (59.3)
Average rainy days	7.2	5.2	8.3	11.9	22.3	26.5	28.3	28.2	27.3	26.4	18.7	11.8	222.1
Source: Meteoblue

== Demographics ==
Population census of Tobias Fornier
Year	Pop.	±% p.a.
1903	8,280	—
1918	15,792	+4.40%
1939	21,249	+1.42%
1948	23,702	+1.22%
1960	15,329	−3.57%
1970	19,063	+2.20%
1975	21,139	+2.09%
1980	22,511	+1.27%
1990	25,816	+1.38%
1995	26,155	+0.24%
2000	27,331	+0.95%
2007	29,772	+1.19%
2010	30,669	+1.09%
2015	33,046	+1.43%
2020	33,816	+0.49%
2024	34,411	+0.42%
Source: Philippine Statistics Authority

In the 2024 census, Tobias Fornier had a population of 34,411 people. The population density was 310 inhabitants per square kilometre (800/sq mi).

== Economy ==
Poverty incidence of Tobias Fornier, Antique (%)

Source: Philippine Statistics Authority

== Education ==
The Tobias Fornier Schools District Office governs all educational institutions within the municipality. It oversees the management and operations of all private and public, from primary to secondary schools.

=== Primary and elementary schools ===
- Abaca Elementary School
- Aras-asan Elementary School
- Atabay Elementary School
- Atiotes Elementary School
- Barasanan Elementary School
- Camandagan Elementary School
- Camansi Elementary School
- Cato-ogan Elementary School
- Danawan Elementary School
- Dao Catholic High School, Inc. Grade School and Elementary Department
- Dao Central School
- Diclum Elementary School
- Gamad Sto. Tomas Elementary School
- Igbalogo Elementary School
- Igbangcal Elementary School
- Igbanos Primary School
- Igcadac Elementary School
- Igcado Elementary School
- Igcaputol Primary School
- Igdanlog Elementary School
- Igdurarog Primary School
- Igtugas Elementary School
- Kid's Nest School
- Lawigan Elementary School
- Lindero Elementary School
- Manaling Primary School
- Masayo Elementary School
- Nagsubuan Elementary School
- Nasuli Elementary School
- Opsan Primary School
- Paciencia Elementary School
- Quezon Elementary School
- Roa's Study Center
- Sta. Maria Primary School
- Villaflor Elementary School
- Ysulat Elementary School

=== Secondary schools ===
- Barasanan National High School
- Concepcion L. Cazenas Memorial School
- Diclum National High School
- Gamad-Sto. Tomas National High School
- Igcado National High School
- Pascual M. Osuyos Memorial High School

• Dao Catholic High School, Inc.

== See also ==
- List of renamed cities and municipalities in the Philippines
