= Hamtic =

Municipality in Antique, Philippines

Hamtic Antiqué, Antique
- Municipality
- Municipality of Hamtic
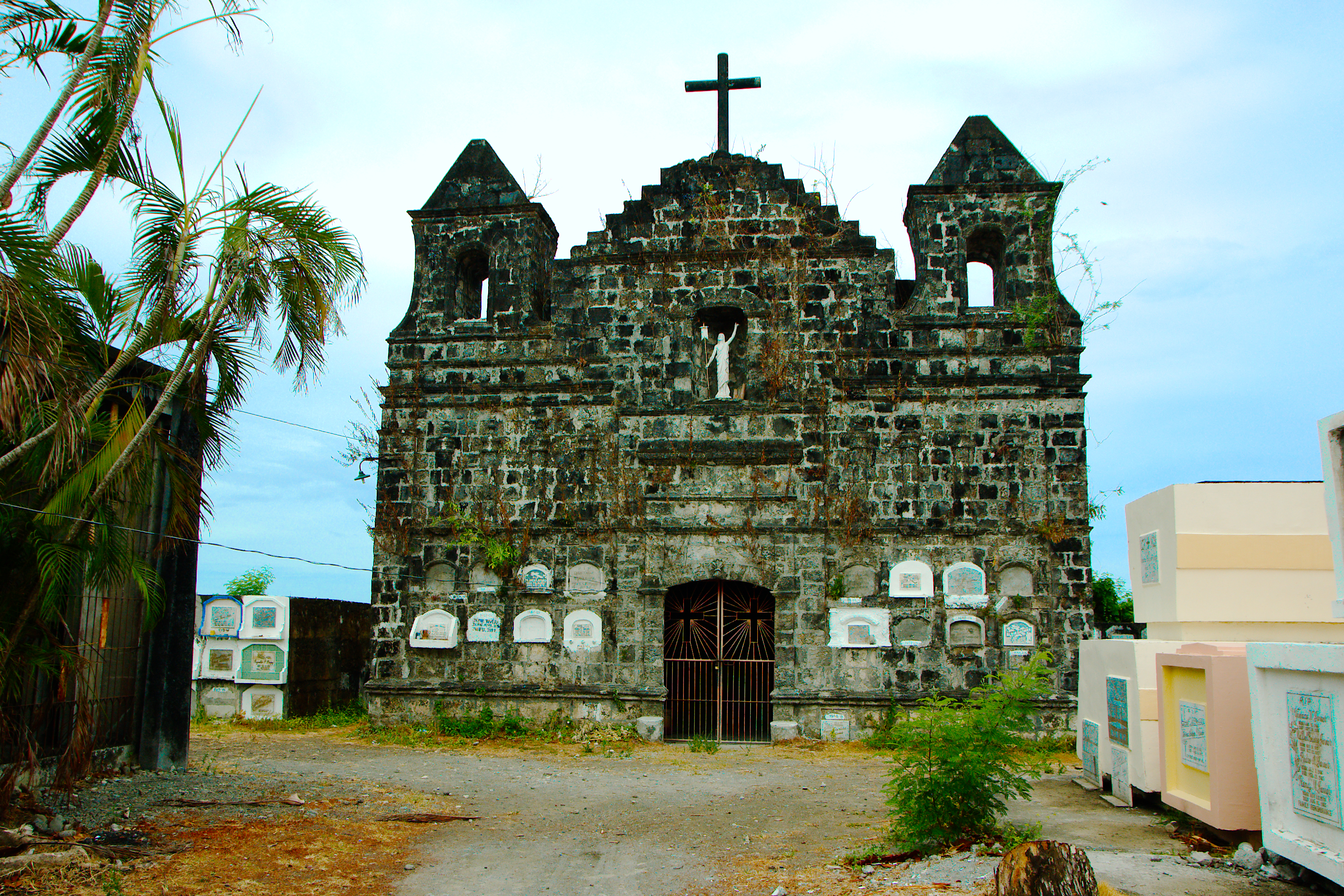
- Hamtic Cemetery Chapel

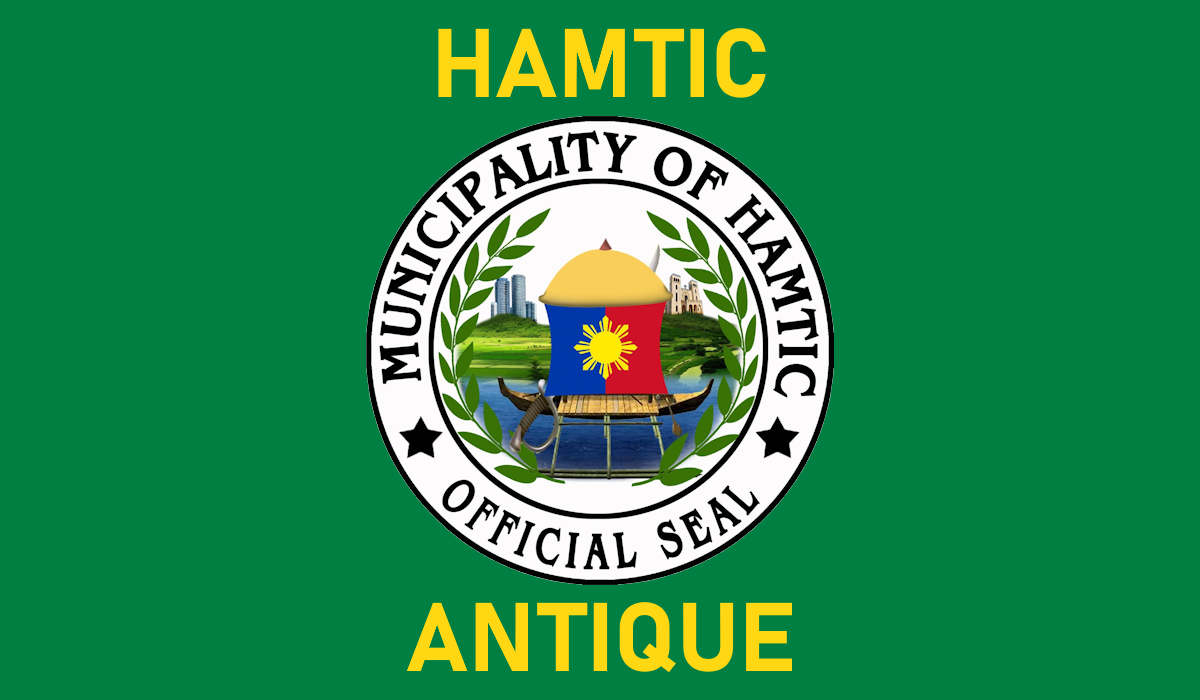
- Flag
- Etymology: Fire ant
- Interactive map of Hamtic
- Location within the Philippines
- Coordinates: 10°42′N 121°59′E
- Country: Philippines
- Region: Western Visayas
- Province: Antique
- District: Lone district
- Chartered: January 20, 1954
- Barangays: 47 (see Barangays)

Government
  - Type: Sangguniang Bayan
  - Mayor: Julius D. Pacificador
  - Vice Mayor: Julius Ronald L. Pacificador
  - Representative: Antonio Legarda Jr.
  - Municipal Council: Members: Gil M. Checa; Lot C. Bulac Jr.; Evangeline S. Pacete; Celestino A. Peroy; Joker Alberto D. Pacificador; Edmand O. Sumaculub; Jose N. Javier; Edsel V. Kasilag
  - Electorate: 31,375 voters (2025)

Area
  - Total: 113.03 km^{2} (43.64 sq mi)
- Highest elevation (Mount Junes): 542 m (1,778 ft)
- Lowest elevation: 0 m (0 ft)

Population (2024 census)
  - Total: 54,455
  - Density: 481.77/km^{2} (1,247.8/sq mi)
  - Households: 12,419

Economy
  - Income class: 2nd municipal income class
  - Poverty incidence: 16.13% (2023)
  - Revenue: ₱ 210.7 million (2024)
  - Assets: ₱ 619.5 million (2024)
  - Expenditure: ₱ 107.2 million (2024)
  - Liabilities: ₱ 159.4 million (2024)

Service provider
  - Electricity: Antique Electric Cooperative (ANTECO)
- Time zone: UTC+8 (PST)
- ZIP code: 5715
- PSGC: 060608000
- IDD : area code: +63 (0)36
- Native languages: Karay-a; Ati; Hiligaynon; Tagalog
- Website: hamtic.gov.ph

Hamtic, officially the Municipality of Hamtic (Kinaray-a: Banwa kang Hamtic; Hiligaynon: Banwa sang Hamtic; Tagalog: Bayan ng Hamtic), is a municipality in the province of Antique, Philippines. According to the 2024 census, it has a population of 54,455 people.

It is a quiet town known for its history, natural beauty, and well-kept heritage sites. Hamtic possesses beaches, green landscapes, and local food made with fresh seafood and tropical produce.

== Etymology ==
Hantik was named after the humming big black ants that produce the sound "tik" when they bite.

== History ==
Hamtic was formerly named Antique, after which the province was named. It is the oldest town and the first capital of the province before it was transferred to San Jose de Buenavista in 1802. The 1818 Spanish census then recorded 2,504 native families in the area, living in harmony with 12 Spanish-Filipino families.

Hamtic was created from portions of San Jose de Buenavista, through Executive Order No. 3 signed by President Ramon Magsaysay on January 5, 1954.

== Geography ==
Hamtic is 7 kilometers (4.3 mi) from the provincial capital, San Jose de Buenavista.

According to the Philippine Statistics Authority, the municipality has a land area of 113.03 square kilometres (43.64 sq mi) constituting 4.14% of the 2,729.17-square-kilometre- (1,053.74 sq mi) total area of Antique.

=== Barangays ===
Hamtic is politically subdivided into 47 barangays. Each barangay consists of puroks and some have sitios.

PSGC	Barangay	Population			±% p.a.	
		2024		2010		
060608001	Apdo	1.5%	818	798	▴	0.17%
060608002	Asluman	4.2%	2,296	2,041	▴	0.82%
060608003	Banawon	2.0%	1,069	1,043	▴	0.17%
060608005	Bia-an	2.0%	1,089	1,087	▴	0.01%
060608006	Bongbongan I-II	1.4%	764	790	▾	−0.23%
060608008	Bongbongan III	0.9%	475	425	▴	0.77%
060608009	Botbot	0.8%	449	392	▴	0.94%
060608010	Budbudan	2.0%	1,076	873	▴	1.46%
060608011	Buhang	4.0%	2,159	1,960	▴	0.67%
060608012	Calacja I	1.6%	878	827	▴	0.41%
060608013	Calacja II	1.7%	904	873	▴	0.24%
060608014	Calala	1.5%	802	769	▴	0.29%
060608015	Cantulan	0.3%	180	194	▾	−0.52%
060608016	Caridad	3.8%	2,043	1,940	▴	0.36%
060608017	Caromangay	1.2%	627	622	▴	0.06%
060608018	Casalngan	1.1%	613	589	▴	0.28%
060608019	Dangcalan	0.7%	398	348	▴	0.93%
060608020	Del Pilar	0.5%	277	326	▾	−1.12%
060608021	Fabrica	1.3%	688	678	▴	0.10%
060608022	Funda	4.2%	2,298	2,141	▴	0.49%
060608023	General Fullon (Tina)	1.3%	703	672	▴	0.31%
060608030	Gov. Evelio B. Javier (Lanag)	3.4%	1,844	1,694	▴	0.59%
060608024	Guintas	4.2%	2,264	2,165	▴	0.31%
060608025	Igbical	1.1%	618	583	▴	0.40%
060608026	Igbucagay	1.0%	561	491	▴	0.93%
060608027	Inabasan	1.4%	787	762	▴	0.22%
060608028	Ingwan-Batangan	1.8%	989	964	▴	0.18%
060608029	La Paz	3.7%	2,000	1,791	▴	0.77%
060608031	Linaban	2.8%	1,538	1,414	▴	0.58%
060608033	Malandog	3.6%	1,959	1,941	▴	0.06%
060608034	Mapatag	3.6%	1,979	1,799	▴	0.66%
060608035	Masanag	1.5%	800	716	▴	0.77%
060608036	Nalihawan	0.5%	276	307	▾	−0.73%
060608037	Pamandayan (Botbot)	0.3%	172	152	▴	0.86%
060608038	Pasu-Jungao	0.3%	151	157	▾	−0.27%
060608039	Piape I	2.6%	1,442	1,331	▴	0.56%
060608040	Piape II	1.1%	612	608	▴	0.05%
060608041	Piape III	2.0%	1,101	1,411	▾	−1.70%
060608042	Pili 1, 2, 3	0.6%	337	336	▴	0.02%
060608045	Poblacion 1	1.8%	964	953	▴	0.08%
060608046	Poblacion 2	1.6%	887	862	▴	0.20%
060608047	Poblacion 3	1.2%	658	607	▴	0.56%
060608048	Poblacion 4	1.9%	1,020	1,011	▴	0.06%
060608049	Poblacion 5	3.1%	1,680	1,590	▴	0.38%
060608050	Pu-ao	1.9%	1,040	980	▴	0.41%
060608051	Suloc	0.2%	117	115	▴	0.12%
060608053	Villavert-Jimenez	4.0%	2,190	1,855	▴	1.15%
	Total		54,455	45,983	▴	1.18%

=== Climate ===
Climate data for Hamtic, Antique
Month	Jan	Feb	Mar	Apr	May	Jun	Jul	Aug	Sep	Oct	Nov	Dec	Year
Mean daily maximum °C (°F)	30 (86)	31 (88)	32 (90)	33 (91)	32 (90)	30 (86)	29 (84)	29 (84)	29 (84)	29 (84)	30 (86)	30 (86)	30 (87)
Mean daily minimum °C (°F)	21 (70)	21 (70)	22 (72)	23 (73)	25 (77)	25 (77)	25 (77)	25 (77)	24 (75)	24 (75)	23 (73)	22 (72)	23 (74)
Average precipitation mm (inches)	19 (0.7)	17 (0.7)	26 (1.0)	37 (1.5)	119 (4.7)	191 (7.5)	258 (10.2)	260 (10.2)	248 (9.8)	196 (7.7)	97 (3.8)	39 (1.5)	1,507 (59.3)
Average rainy days	7.2	5.2	8.3	11.9	22.3	26.5	28.3	28.2	27.3	26.4	18.7	11.8	222.1
Source: Meteoblue (modeled/calculated data, not measured locally)

== Demographics ==
Hamtic Municipal Hall

Population census of Hamtic
Year	Pop.	±% p.a.
1960	18,534	—
1970	22,987	+2.17%
1975	24,967	+1.67%
1980	28,526	+2.70%
1990	34,394	+1.89%
1995	36,167	+0.95%
2000	38,230	+1.20%
2007	42,375	+1.43%
2010	45,983	+3.02%
2015	48,592	+1.06%
2020	52,685	+1.72%
2024	54,455	+0.80%
Source: Philippine Statistics Authority

In the 2024 census, Hamtic had a population of 54,455 people. The population density was 480 inhabitants per square kilometre (1,200/sq mi).

=== Languages ===
The people of Hamtic speak Hamtikanon, a unique town dialect followed by Kinaray-a, the main dialect of the province. Hiligaynon is also widely spoken in the municipality and it is understood by the residents.

== Economy ==
Poverty incidence of Hamtic (%)

Source: Philippine Statistics Authority

== Education ==
There are two schools district offices which govern all educational institutions within the municipality. They oversee the management and operations of all private and public, from primary to secondary schools. These are the:

- Hamtic North Schools District
- Hamtic South Schools District

=== Primary and elementary schools ===
Fabrica Elementary School

- Alberto Siasat Elementary School (Casalngan Elementary School)
- Apdo Elementary School
- Asluman Elementary School
- Bia-an Elementary School
- Bongbongan Elementary School
- Botbot Elementary School
- Bongbongan I-II Elementary School
- Budbudan Elementary School
- Buhang Elementary School
- Buhang Elementary School (Annex)
- Calacja II Elementary School
- Calala Elementary School
- Cantulan Elementary School
- Del Pilar Elementary School
- Fabrica Elementary School
- Guintas Elementary School
- Hamtic Central School
- Hon. Francisco Zabala Memorial Elementary School
- Igbical Elementary School
- Igbucagay Elementary School
- Ingwan-Batangan Elementary School
- Iraya Elementary School
- La Paz Elementary School
- Lanag Elementary School
- Linaban Elementary School
- M. Buyco Elementary School
- Malandog Elementary School
- Mapatag Elementary School
- Masanag Elementary School
- Melanio Velasco Elementary School (Caromangay Elementary School)
- Mercedes Villavert Velasco Elementary School
- Miacton Elementary School
- Moscoso-Rios Central School
- Piapi Elementary School
- Piape III Elementary School
- Pili Elementary School
- Pu-ao Elementary School
- Severo Osunero Elementary School
- Sta. Monica Kinder School
- Sto Niño De Guinsang-an Kinder School
- Tina Elementary School
- Tubeza-Marcaliñas Elementary School
- Villavert Memorial Elementary School

=== Secondary schools ===
- Buhang National High School
- Gen. Leandro Fullon National High School
- Gov. Julio V. Macuja Memorial Comprehensive High School
- Governor Julian Fullon Pacificador National School
- Guintas National High School
- Moscoso-Rios National High School

== Notable personalities ==
- Leandro Fullon (1874–1904) – Filipino general and government administrator
