= 2010 Western Visayas local elections =

Local elections were held in Western Visayas on May 10, 2010, as part of the 2010 Philippine general election.

== Aklan ==
=== Governor ===
Incumbent governor Carlito Marquez of Lakas–Kampi–CMD won re-election to a third term.

Candidate	Party	Votes	%
Carlito Marquez	Lakas–Kampi–CMD	166,099	78.30
Leovigildo Mationg	Lapiang Manggagawa	40,895	19.28
Anthony Acevedo	Independent	5,140	2.42
Total		212,134	100.00
Valid votes		212,134	86.23
Invalid/blank votes		33,868	13.77
Total votes		246,002	100.00
Lakas–Kampi–CMD hold			
Source: Commission on Elections

=== Vice governor ===
Incumbent vice governor Gabrielle Calizo-Quimpo of the Nacionalista Party won re-election to a second term.

Candidate	Party	Votes	%
Gabrielle Calizo-Quimpo	Nacionalista Party	126,981	65.54
Roberto Garcia Jr.	Pwersa ng Masang Pilipino	66,776	34.46
Total		193,757	100.00
Valid votes		193,757	78.76
Invalid/blank votes		52,245	21.24
Total votes		246,002	100.00
Nacionalista Party hold			
Source: Commission on Elections

=== Provincial board ===
The Aklan Provincial Board is composed of 13 board members, 10 of whom are elected.

Party	Votes	%	Seats
Lakas–Kampi–CMD	403,786	51.91	7
Pwersa ng Masang Pilipino	127,911	16.44	2
Nacionalista Party	118,320	15.21	0
Bagumbayan–VNP	52,795	6.79	1
Liberal Party	44,352	5.70	0
Independent	30,762	3.95	0
Total	777,926	100.00	10
Total votes	246,002	–	
Source: Commission on Elections

==== 1st district ====
Candidate	Party	Votes	%
Nemesio Neron	Lakas–Kampi–CMD	57,411	14.08
Daisy Briones	Lakas–Kampi–CMD	54,425	13.35
Raymar Rebaldo	Bagumbayan–VNP	52,795	12.95
Jean Rodriguez	Lakas–Kampi–CMD	49,092	12.04
Rodson Mayor	Lakas–Kampi–CMD	47,659	11.69
Lillian Tirol	Liberal Party	44,352	10.88
Santiago Regalado	Independent	30,762	7.54
Rizal Rodriguez Jr.	Nacionalista Party	28,518	6.99
Alita Venus	Nacionalista Party	23,031	5.65
Vicente Mariano Pador	Pwersa ng Masang Pilipino	19,682	4.83
Total		407,727	100.00
Total votes		128,983	–
Source: Commission on Elections

==== 2nd district ====
Candidate	Party	Votes	%
Jose Enrique Miraflores	Lakas–Kampi–CMD	58,355	15.76
Selwyn Ibarreta	Lakas–Kampi–CMD	55,781	15.07
Phoebe Clarice Cabagnot	Pwersa ng Masang Pilipino	48,136	13.00
Gerick Templonuevo	Lakas–Kampi–CMD	46,029	12.43
Victor Manuel Garcia	Pwersa ng Masang Pilipino	37,897	10.24
Dominador Ilio Jr.	Lakas–Kampi–CMD	35,034	9.46
Ramon Gelito	Nacionalista Party	34,322	9.27
Romeo Inocencio	Nacionalista Party	32,449	8.77
Dino Patrick Ta-ay	Pwersa ng Masang Pilipino	15,464	4.18
Nelia Sancho	Pwersa ng Masang Pilipino	6,732	1.82
Total		370,199	100.00
Total votes		117,019	–
Source: Commission on Elections

== Antique ==
=== Governor ===
Term-limited incumbent governor Salvacion Z. Perez of the Nationalist People's Coalition ran for the House of Representatives in Antique's lone district. Representative Exequiel Javier of Lakas–Kampi–CMD won the election.

Candidate	Party	Votes	%
Exequiel Javier	Lakas–Kampi–CMD	111,642	56.48
Rhodora Cadiao	Pwersa ng Masang Pilipino	82,045	41.50
Jose Angor Jr.	Bangon Pilipinas	3,993	2.02
Total		197,680	100.00
Valid votes		197,680	84.27
Invalid/blank votes		36,911	15.73
Total votes		234,591	100.00
Lakas–Kampi–CMD gain from Nationalist People's Coalition			
Source: Commission on Elections

=== Vice governor ===
Incumbent vice governor Rhodora Cadiao of Pwersa ng Masang Pilipino ran for Governor of Antique. Former provincial board member Rosie Dimamay of Lakas–Kampi–CMD won the election.

Candidate	Party	Votes	%
Rosie Dimamay	Lakas–Kampi–CMD	66,667	36.35
Fernando Corvera	Liberal Party	36,284	19.79
Vincent Piccio III	Independent	34,212	18.66
Hector Frangue	Independent	23,306	12.71
Errol Santillan	Aksyon Demokratiko	18,639	10.16
Gaspar Ambong	Independent	4,279	2.33
Total		183,387	100.00
Valid votes		183,387	78.17
Invalid/blank votes		51,204	21.83
Total votes		234,591	100.00
Lakas–Kampi–CMD gain from Pwersa ng Masang Pilipino			
Source: Commission on Elections

=== Provincial board ===
The Antique Provincial Board is composed of 13 board members, 10 of whom are elected.

Party	Votes	%	Seats
Lakas–Kampi–CMD	325,397	48.27	6
Nationalist People's Coalition	144,686	21.46	1
Pwersa ng Masang Pilipino	58,338	8.65	1
Liberal Party	27,314	4.05	0
Nacionalista Party	18,612	2.76	0
Independent	99,722	14.79	2
Total	674,069	100.00	10
Total votes	234,591	–	
Source: Commission on Elections

==== 1st district ====
Candidate	Party	Votes	%
Edgar Denosta	Lakas–Kampi–CMD	48,537	13.42
Dante Beriong	Independent	43,717	12.09
J. Tobias Javier	Lakas–Kampi–CMD	41,326	11.43
Dino Roel Operiano	Lakas–Kampi–CMD	39,938	11.05
Roland Plameras	Lakas–Kampi–CMD	34,622	9.58
Damian Marfil	Liberal Party	27,314	7.55
Nelly Abiera	Lakas–Kampi–CMD	26,982	7.46
Alfonso Combong III	Nationalist People's Coalition	20,961	5.80
Penny Cabrejas	Nationalist People's Coalition	19,202	5.31
Julito Osunero	Nationalist People's Coalition	18,726	5.18
Bernie Salcedo	Nacionalista Party	18,612	5.15
Ma. Carmen Tubianosa	Nationalist People's Coalition	14,799	4.09
Rubina Javier	Independent	6,851	1.89
Total		361,587	100.00
Total votes		116,051	–
Source: Commission on Elections

==== 2nd district ====
Candidate	Party	Votes	%
Egidio Elio	Independent	46,187	14.78
Victor Condez	Lakas–Kampi–CMD	43,084	13.79
Plaridel Sanchez VI	Nationalist People's Coalition	36,064	11.54
Calixto Zaldivar III	Pwersa ng Masang Pilipino	34,497	11.04
Joseph Eugene Alojipan	Lakas–Kampi–CMD	34,483	11.04
Ediviano Mosquera	Lakas–Kampi–CMD	33,178	10.62
Emmanuel Palacios Jr.	Pwersa ng Masang Pilipino	23,841	7.63
Teopisto Estaris Jr.	Lakas–Kampi–CMD	23,247	7.44
Benjamin Juanitas	Nationalist People's Coalition	20,071	6.42
Flord Nicson Calawag	Nationalist People's Coalition	14,863	4.76
Joel Valenzuela Sr.	Independent	2,967	0.95
Total		312,482	100.00
Total votes		118,540	–
Source: Commission on Elections

== Bacolod ==
=== Mayor ===
Incumbent mayor Evelio Leonardia of the Nationalist People's Coalition won re-election to a third term.

Candidate	Party	Votes	%
Evelio Leonardia	Nationalist People's Coalition	93,519	47.48
Monico Puentevella	Lakas–Kampi–CMD	86,258	43.79
Vladimir Gonzalez	Independent	13,647	6.93
Andrea Si	Independent	3,547	1.80
Total		196,971	100.00
Valid votes		196,971	95.95
Invalid/blank votes		8,311	4.05
Total votes		205,282	100.00
Nationalist People's Coalition hold			
Source: Commission on Elections

=== Vice mayor ===
Incumbent vice mayor Jude Thaddeus Sayson of the Nationalist People's Coalition won re-election to a second term.

Candidate	Party	Votes	%
Jude Thaddeus Sayson	Nationalist People's Coalition	87,429	49.32
Ana Marie Palermo	Independent	61,616	34.76
Wilson Gamboa Jr.	Independent	27,152	15.32
Johram Alama	Independent	1,072	0.60
Total		177,269	100.00
Valid votes		177,269	86.35
Invalid/blank votes		28,013	13.65
Total votes		205,282	100.00
Nationalist People's Coalition hold			
Source: Commission on Elections

=== City council ===
The Bacolod City Council is composed of 12 councilors, 10 of whom are elected.

Party	Votes	%	Seats
Nationalist People's Coalition	509,225	28.15	5
Nacionalista Party	210,957	11.66	2
Nacionalista Party/Paglaum Sang Banwa	57,954	3.20	0
Ang Kapatiran	22,864	1.26	0
Pwersa ng Masang Pilipino	14,075	0.78	0
Independent	994,179	54.95	5
Total	1,809,254	100.00	12
Total votes	205,282	–	
Source: Commission on Elections

Candidate	Party	Votes	%
El Cid Familiaran	Independent	76,126	4.21
Homer Bais	Nationalist People's Coalition	75,669	4.18
Archie Baribar	Independent	73,781	4.08
Bobby Rojas	Nationalist People's Coalition	72,498	4.01
Catalino Alisbo	Independent	69,361	3.83
Em Ang	Nationalist People's Coalition	68,918	3.81
Dindo Ramos	Nationalist People's Coalition	67,822	3.75
Elmer Sy	Independent	64,918	3.59
Sonya Verdeflor	Independent	64,877	3.59
Al Victor Espino	Nationalist People's Coalition	61,155	3.38
Caesar Distrito	Nacionalista Party	61,016	3.37
Carlos Jose Lopez	Nacionalista Party	60,057	3.32
Alex Paglumotan	Nationalist People's Coalition	58,708	3.24
Philip Montelibano	Nacionalista Party/Paglaum Sang Banwa	57,954	3.20
Celia Matea Flor	Independent	57,919	3.20
Lorney Dilag	Independent	53,942	2.98
Marie Crystal May Vega	Nacionalista Party	53,128	2.94
Bobbie Lucasan	Independent	52,734	2.91
Vicente Petierre III	Nationalist People's Coalition	52,402	2.90
Napoleon Cordova	Nationalist People's Coalition	52,053	2.88
Ma Victoria Garcia	Independent	49,871	2.76
Robert Francis Coscolluela	Independent	40,447	2.24
Marlon Solidum	Independent	38,964	2.15
Jose Maria Regalado Jr.	Independent	36,900	2.04
Juan Miguel Estrella	Nacionalista Party	36,756	2.03
Norma Juarez	Independent	34,692	1.92
Adolfo Leonardia	Independent	31,067	1.72
Buen Gallenero	Independent	30,113	1.66
Bartolome Orola	Independent	29,459	1.63
Jayvee Hinlo	Independent	24,728	1.37
Pedro Diamante	Independent	19,082	1.05
Marvin Tañada	Independent	17,129	0.95
Ricardo Danoy Sr.	Independent	16,081	0.89
John Francis Tupas	Pwersa ng Masang Pilipino	14,075	0.78
Emmanuel Aguilar Jr.	Independent	11,851	0.66
Anthony Garcia	Independent	11,331	0.63
Marlon Sy	Independent	11,220	0.62
Jenette Duro	Independent	10,868	0.60
Edwin Balajadia	Independent	10,623	0.59
Vicky Fernandez	Independent	10,472	0.58
Maximino Cordero	Independent	8,380	0.46
Renato Bañas	Independent	7,578	0.42
Rita Jimenez	Ang Kapatiran	7,163	0.40
Rodolfo Tinsay Jr.	Independent	6,539	0.36
Cesar Torrecarion	Independent	6,217	0.34
Liberato Amante	Independent	5,513	0.30
Marcos Templado	Ang Kapatiran	5,180	0.29
Gregorio Jimena	Independent	4,222	0.23
Siegfredo Magalona	Ang Kapatiran	4,048	0.22
Genly Carreon	Independent	3,819	0.21
Joel Bonifacio	Ang Kapatiran	3,653	0.20
Vicente Gico Jr.	Ang Kapatiran	2,820	0.16
Bernardo Nonato Jr.	Independent	2,252	0.12
Felbert Quismundo	Independent	1,103	0.06
Total		1,809,254	100.00
Total votes		205,282	–
Source: Commission on Elections

== Capiz ==
=== Governor ===
Incumbent governor Victor Tanco of the Liberal Party won re-election to a second term.

Candidate	Party	Votes	%
Victor Tanco	Liberal Party	189,501	60.54
Jocelyn Bolante	Ugyon Kita Capiz	121,176	38.71
Zenon Amoroso	Independent	2,329	0.74
Total		313,006	100.00
Valid votes		313,006	91.00
Invalid/blank votes		30,971	9.00
Total votes		343,977	100.00
Liberal Party hold			
Source: Commission on Elections

=== Vice governor ===
Incumbent vice governor Felipe Barredo of Ugyon Kita Capiz ran for the House of Representatives in Capiz's 1st district. Ugyon Kita Capiz nominated former Roxas City councilor Mark Anthony Ortiz, who was defeated by provincial board member Esteban Evan Contreras of the Liberal Party.

Candidate	Party	Votes	%
Esteban Evan Contreras	Liberal Party	170,340	58.03
Mark Anthony Ortiz	Ugyon Kita Capiz	123,210	41.97
Total		293,550	100.00
Valid votes		293,550	85.34
Invalid/blank votes		50,427	14.66
Total votes		343,977	100.00
Liberal Party gain from Ugyon Kita Capiz			
Source: Commission on Elections

=== Provincial board ===
The Capiz Provincial Board is composed of 13 board members, 10 of whom are elected.

Party	Votes	%	Seats
Liberal Party	543,867	45.71	5
Ugyon Kita Capiz	277,265	23.30	1
Lakas–Kampi–CMD	275,047	23.12	4
Nationalist People's Coalition	23,935	2.01	0
Philippine Green Republican Party	12,270	1.03	0
Independent	57,372	4.82	0
Total	1,189,756	100.00	10
Total votes	343,977	–	
Source: Commission on Elections

==== 1st district ====
Candidate	Party	Votes	%
Jonathan Besa	Liberal Party	69,220	11.30
Blesilda Almalbis	Ugyon Kita Capiz	69,032	11.27
Remia Fuentes-Bartolome	Liberal Party	68,447	11.17
Roberto Ignacio	Liberal Party	63,484	10.36
Eduardo Magallanes	Liberal Party	61,800	10.09
David Felix Bauson	Liberal Party	60,152	9.82
Cesar Yap Jr.	Ugyon Kita Capiz	58,091	9.48
Naome Dumapig	Ugyon Kita Capiz	54,083	8.83
Ramon Albar	Ugyon Kita Capiz	54,015	8.82
Kenneth Alovera	Ugyon Kita Capiz	42,044	6.86
Domingo Belonio	Philippine Green Republican Party	12,270	2.00
Total		612,638	100.00
Total votes		178,797	–
Source: Commission on Elections

==== 2nd district ====
Candidate	Party	Votes	%
Jaime Magbanua	Lakas–Kampi–CMD	61,949	10.73
Ma. Emile Ardivilla	Lakas–Kampi–CMD	57,916	10.04
Jeffrey Layo	Lakas–Kampi–CMD	56,750	9.83
Aldwin Cruz-Am	Liberal Party	56,153	9.73
Camilo Robles	Lakas–Kampi–CMD	49,400	8.56
Henry Reyes	Lakas–Kampi–CMD	49,032	8.50
Christopher Andaya	Liberal Party	48,987	8.49
Winston Advincula	Liberal Party	43,132	7.47
Antonio Arciga	Liberal Party	38,227	6.62
Mario Niel San Felix	Liberal Party	34,265	5.94
Eleuper Martinez	Nationalist People's Coalition	23,935	4.15
Vicente Alejaga	Independent	20,251	3.51
Varvin Hope Hiñola	Independent	13,653	2.37
Antonio Martinez	Independent	10,105	1.75
Preston Villasis	Independent	7,800	1.35
Ernesto Bulilan	Independent	5,563	0.96
Total		577,118	100.00
Total votes		165,180	–
Source: Commission on Elections

== Guimaras ==
=== Governor ===
Incumbent governor Felipe Hilan Nava of Lakas–Kampi–CMD won re-election to a second term.

Candidate	Party	Votes	%
Felipe Hilan Nava	Lakas–Kampi–CMD	56,766	80.81
Gerry Yucon	Pwersa ng Masang Pilipino	13,482	19.19
Total		70,248	100.00
Valid votes		70,248	91.60
Invalid/blank votes		6,442	8.40
Total votes		76,690	100.00
Lakas–Kampi–CMD hold			
Source: Commission on Elections

=== Vice governor ===
Incumbent vice governor Aurelio Tionado of Lakas–Kampi–CMD won re-election to a third term.

Candidate	Party	Votes	%
Aurelio Tionado	Lakas–Kampi–CMD	49,824	75.52
David Gano	Independent	16,149	24.48
Total		65,973	100.00
Valid votes		65,973	86.03
Invalid/blank votes		10,717	13.97
Total votes		76,690	100.00
Lakas–Kampi–CMD hold			
Source: Commission on Elections

=== Provincial board ===
The Guimaras Provincial Board is composed of 11 board members, 8 of whom are elected.

Party	Votes	%	Seats
Lakas–Kampi–CMD	110,091	53.95	6
Nacionalista Party	38,717	18.97	2
Pwersa ng Masang Pilipino	38,463	18.85	0
Nationalist People's Coalition	13,248	6.49	0
Independent	3,552	1.74	0
Total	204,071	100.00	8
Total votes	76,690	–	
Source: Commission on Elections

==== 1st district ====
Candidate	Party	Votes	%
Vicente de Asis	Lakas–Kampi–CMD	17,819	18.83
Roy Habaña	Nacionalista Party	17,614	18.61
Rolando Gadnanan	Lakas–Kampi–CMD	17,197	18.17
Wilme Denila	Lakas–Kampi–CMD	16,242	17.16
Arsenio Zambarrano	Pwersa ng Masang Pilipino	11,353	12.00
Arturo Fernandez	Pwersa ng Masang Pilipino	8,413	8.89
Pablito Esmaya	Pwersa ng Masang Pilipino	6,000	6.34
Total		94,638	100.00
Total votes		34,357	–
Source: Commission on Elections

==== 2nd district ====
Candidate	Party	Votes	%
Avelino Gonzaga	Lakas–Kampi–CMD	22,832	20.86
Patricio Gange	Nacionalista Party	21,103	19.28
Josephine Detablan	Lakas–Kampi–CMD	18,366	16.78
Emilio Esmeralda	Lakas–Kampi–CMD	17,635	16.11
Felix Nava	Nationalist People's Coalition	13,248	12.11
Bernie Miaque	Pwersa ng Masang Pilipino	9,974	9.11
Rosemarie Alavata	Pwersa ng Masang Pilipino	2,723	2.49
Gregorio Garmay	Independent	2,157	1.97
Fred Esponilla	Independent	1,395	1.27
Total		109,433	100.00
Total votes		42,333	–
Source: Commission on Elections

== Iloilo ==
=== Governor ===
Term-limited incumbent governor Niel Tupas Sr. of the Liberal Party ran for the House of Representatives in Iloilo's 4th district. The Liberal Party nominated Tupas' son, Term-limited Barotac Viejo Mayor Raul Tupas, who was defeated by representative Arthur Defensor Sr. of Lakas–Kampi–CMD.

Candidate	Party	Votes	%
Arthur Defensor Sr.	Lakas–Kampi–CMD	353,017	49.92
Raul Tupas	Liberal Party	329,676	46.62
Josil Jaen	Independent	12,135	1.72
Serapio Camposano	Independent	7,126	1.01
Nolbert Gil	Independent	5,239	0.74
Total		707,193	100.00
Valid votes		707,193	87.95
Invalid/blank votes		96,893	12.05
Total votes		804,086	100.00
Lakas–Kampi–CMD gain from Liberal Party			
Source: Commission on Elections

=== Vice governor ===
Incumbent vice governor Rolex Suplico of the Nacionalista Party ran for the House of Representatives in Iloilo's 5th district. Provincial board member Richard Garin of Lakas–Kampi–CMD won the election.

Candidate	Party	Votes	%
Richard Garin	Lakas–Kampi–CMD	411,934	63.56
Roberto Armada	Nationalist People's Coalition	236,176	36.44
Total		648,110	100.00
Valid votes		648,110	80.60
Invalid/blank votes		155,976	19.40
Total votes		804,086	100.00
Lakas–Kampi–CMD gain from Nacionalista Party			
Source: Commission on Elections

=== Provincial board ===
The Iloilo Provincial Board is composed of 13 board members, 10 of whom are elected.

Party	Votes	%	Seats
Liberal Party	452,516	42.19	5
Lakas–Kampi–CMD	426,264	39.75	4
Nacionalista Party	163,884	15.28	1
Independent	29,830	2.78	0
Total	1,072,494	100.00	10
Total votes	804,086	–	
Source: Commission on Elections

==== 1st district ====
Candidate	Party	Votes	%
Macario Napulan	Lakas–Kampi–CMD	78,396	45.26
Gerardo Flores	Liberal Party	48,660	28.09
Carina Flores	Lakas–Kampi–CMD	46,146	26.64
Total		173,202	100.00
Total votes		149,815	–
Source: Commission on Elections

==== 2nd district ====
Candidate	Party	Votes	%
June Mondejar	Liberal Party	62,709	34.03
Demetrio Sonza	Lakas–Kampi–CMD	50,807	27.57
Rodolfo Cabado	Nacionalista Party	40,636	22.05
Wenceslao Sison Jr.	Liberal Party	30,124	16.35
Total		184,276	100.00
Total votes		138,082	–
Source: Commission on Elections

==== 3rd district ====
Candidate	Party	Votes	%
Licurgo Tirador	Lakas–Kampi–CMD	82,535	35.36
Emmanuel Gallar	Liberal Party	70,231	30.09
Juanito Acanto	Lakas–Kampi–CMD	57,601	24.68
Krisna Abordo	Liberal Party	23,032	9.87
Total		233,399	100.00
Total votes		170,796	–
Source: Commission on Elections

==== 4th district ====
Candidate	Party	Votes	%
Hernan Biron Jr.	Nacionalista Party	87,141	35.33
Shalene Hidalgo	Liberal Party	53,423	21.66
Henry Anotado	Liberal Party	40,114	16.27
Ronald Cahuya	Nacionalista Party	36,107	14.64
Pablito Araneta	Independent	19,192	7.78
Jose Ben Palma	Independent	10,638	4.31
Total		246,615	100.00
Total votes		170,140	–
Source: Commission on Elections

==== 5th district ====
Candidate	Party	Votes	%
Nielo Tupas	Liberal Party	87,273	37.14
Jett Rojas	Lakas–Kampi–CMD	60,256	25.64
Jesus Salcedo	Lakas–Kampi–CMD	50,523	21.50
Mildred Chavez	Liberal Party	36,950	15.72
Total		235,002	100.00
Total votes		175,253	–
Source: Commission on Elections

== Iloilo City ==
=== Mayor ===
Term-limited incumbent mayor Jerry Treñas of the Nacionalista Party ran for the House of Representatives in Iloilo City's lone district. Vice mayor Jed Patrick Mabilog won the election.

Candidate	Party	Votes	%
Jed Patrick Mabilog	Liberal Party	80,654	43.61
Raul M. Gonzalez	Lakas–Kampi–CMD	65,509	35.42
Lorenzo Jamora	Independent	38,309	20.71
Vicente Balsomo	Independent	247	0.13
Amelita Benedicto	Independent	223	0.12
Total		184,942	100.00
Valid votes		184,942	95.75
Invalid/blank votes		8,211	4.25
Total votes		193,153	100.00
Liberal Party gain from Nacionalista Party			
Source: ibanangayon.ph

=== Vice mayor ===
Incumbent vice mayor Jed Patrick Mabilog of the Liberal Party ran for Mayor of Iloilo City. Incumbent city councilor Jose Espinosa III of the Nacionalista Party won the election.

Candidate	Party	Votes	%
Jose Espinosa III	Nacionalista Party	63,319	35.36
Julienne Baronda	Pwersa ng Masang Pilipino	58,659	32.76
Antonio Pesina Jr.	Lakas–Kampi–CMD	33,072	18.47
Erwin Plagata	Independent	15,683	8.76
Aquiles Hortillosa Jr.	Independent	6,839	3.82
Carmelo Carreon	Independent	1,474	0.82
Total		179,046	100.00
Valid votes		179,046	92.70
Invalid/blank votes		14,107	7.30
Total votes		193,153	100.00
Nacionalista Party gain from Liberal Party			
Source: ibanangayon.ph

=== City council ===
The Iloilo City Council is composed of 12 city councilors, 10 of whom are elected.

Party	Votes	%	Seats
Lakas–Kampi–CMD	433,424	27.06	2
Liberal Party	222,015	13.86	3
Nacionalista Party	206,510	12.89	1
Pwersa ng Masang Pilipino	171,255	10.69	2
Bayan Muna	19,624	1.23	0
Independent	549,021	34.27	4
Total	1,601,849	100.00	12
Total votes	193,153	–	
Source: ibanangayon.ph

Candidate	Party	Votes	%
Nielex Tupas	Liberal Party	92,227	5.76
Jeffrey Ganzon	Lakas–Kampi–CMD	84,982	5.31
Perla Zulueta	Independent	84,790	5.29
David Raymund Jamora	Independent	76,390	4.77
Edward Yee	Nacionalista Party	76,322	4.76
Jason Gonzales	Independent	75,543	4.72
Joshua Alim	Independent	74,935	4.68
Lyndon Acap	Liberal Party	70,499	4.40
Rodel Agado	Pwersa ng Masang Pilipino	62,885	3.93
Ely Estante Jr.	Lakas–Kampi–CMD	59,699	3.73
R Leone Gerochi	Liberal Party	59,289	3.70
Plaridel Nava II	Pwersa ng Masang Pilipino	58,403	3.65
Johnny Young	Nacionalista Party	56,443	3.52
Erlinda Liberiaga	Pwersa ng Masang Pilipino	49,967	3.12
Eldrid Antiquiera	Lakas–Kampi–CMD	47,239	2.95
Nene dela Llana	Lakas–Kampi–CMD	43,642	2.72
Mandrie Malabor	Independent	41,523	2.59
Roberto Divinagracia	Nacionalista Party	40,679	2.54
Rolando Dabao	Independent	38,868	2.43
Jun Capulot	Lakas–Kampi–CMD	36,394	2.27
Mike Chin Jr.	Lakas–Kampi–CMD	33,852	2.11
Rony Firmeza	Nacionalista Party	33,066	2.06
Eugenio Original	Lakas–Kampi–CMD	32,795	2.05
Paquito Ngo Jr.	Lakas–Kampi–CMD	30,638	1.91
Rodolfo Villegas	Independent	29,297	1.83
Teresa Cataluña	Independent	22,124	1.38
Ernesto Jardeleza Jr.	Lakas–Kampi–CMD	21,972	1.37
Jose Allen Aquino	Independent	21,661	1.35
Edeljulio Romero	Independent	20,887	1.30
Jose Reynaldo Porquia	Bayan Muna	19,624	1.23
Gudelia Coo	Lakas–Kampi–CMD	16,425	1.03
Constantino Abellar	Lakas–Kampi–CMD	13,958	0.87
Peter Abadiano	Independent	13,632	0.85
Jose Marte Nava	Independent	11,846	0.74
Quirico Mendoza Jr.	Lakas–Kampi–CMD	11,828	0.74
Gerardo Cañonero	Independent	9,303	0.58
Cykhee Nava	Independent	8,493	0.53
Mitchel Ituriaga	Independent	6,046	0.38
Oscar King	Independent	4,934	0.31
Ely Gallofin Sr.	Independent	4,794	0.30
Deo Antonio Llamas	Independent	2,652	0.17
Raymundo Peritos	Independent	1,303	0.08
Total		1,601,849	100.00
Total votes		193,153	–
Source: ibanangayon.ph

== Negros Occidental ==
=== Governor ===
Incumbent governor Isidro Zayco of Lakas–Kampi–CMD ran for mayor of Kabankalan. Sagay mayor Alfredo Marañon of the Nationalist People's Coalition won the election.

Candidate	Party	Votes	%
Alfredo Marañon	Nationalist People's Coalition	485,610	58.58
Rafael Coscolluela	Aton Tandon Utod Negrosanon	343,389	41.42
Total		828,999	100.00
Valid votes		828,999	83.62
Invalid/blank votes		162,423	16.38
Total votes		991,422	100.00
Nationalist People's Coalition gain from Lakas–Kampi–CMD			
Source: Commission on Elections

=== Vice governor ===
Incumbent vice governor Dino Yulo of the Nacionalista Party ran for the Negros Occidental Provincial Board in the 5th district. Representative Genaro Alvarez Jr. of the Nationalist People's Coalition won the election.

Candidate	Party	Votes	%
Genaro Alvarez Jr.	Nationalist People's Coalition	487,371	66.52
Enrico Elumba	Aton Tandon Utod Negrosanon	245,258	33.48
Total		732,629	100.00
Valid votes		732,629	73.90
Invalid/blank votes		258,793	26.10
Total votes		991,422	100.00
Nationalist People's Coalition gain from Nacionalista Party			
Source: Commission on Elections

=== Provincial board ===
The Negros Occidental Provincial Board is composed of 15 board members, 12 of whom are elected.

Party	Votes	%	Seats
Lakas–Kampi–CMD	437,369	39.22	5
Nationalist People's Coalition	417,362	37.42	5
Nacionalista Party	171,501	15.38	2
Pwersa ng Masang Pilipino	57,294	5.14	0
Aton Tandon Utod Negrosanon	11,382	1.02	0
Independent	20,291	1.82	0
Total	1,115,199	100.00	12
Total votes	991,422	–	
Source: Commission on Elections

==== 1st district ====
Candidate	Party	Votes	%
Nehemias de la Cruz Sr.	Lakas–Kampi–CMD	89,820	52.45
Renato Gustilo	Nacionalista Party	81,424	47.55
Total		171,244	100.00
Total votes		157,388	–
Source: Commission on Elections

==== 2nd district ====
Candidate	Party	Votes	%
Salvador Escalante Jr.	Lakas–Kampi–CMD	68,834	53.16
Miller Serondo	Nationalist People's Coalition	60,659	46.84
Total		129,493	100.00
Total votes		133,104	–
Source: Commission on Elections

==== 3rd district ====
Candidate	Party	Votes	%
Patrick Lacson	Lakas–Kampi–CMD	108,033	51.99
Manuel Frederick Ko	Nationalist People's Coalition	99,753	48.01
Total		207,786	100.00
Total votes		203,918	–
Source: Commission on Elections

==== 4th district ====
Candidate	Party	Votes	%
Mae Javellana	Nationalist People's Coalition	93,472	57.04
Jose Benito Alonso	Nationalist People's Coalition	70,400	42.96
Total		163,872	100.00
Total votes		160,266	–
Source: Commission on Elections

==== 5th district ====
Candidate	Party	Votes	%
Dino Yulo	Nacionalista Party	90,077	39.98
Melvin Ibañez	Lakas–Kampi–CMD	66,542	29.54
Jerry Yulo	Pwersa ng Masang Pilipino	35,320	15.68
Edy de los Reyes	Pwersa ng Masang Pilipino	21,974	9.75
Darwin Destacamento	Aton Tandon Utod Negrosanon	11,382	5.05
Total		225,295	100.00
Total votes		170,771	–
Source: Commission on Elections

==== 6th district ====
Candidate	Party	Votes	%
Pedro Zayco Jr.	Lakas–Kampi–CMD	104,140	47.88
Helen Zafra	Nationalist People's Coalition	93,078	42.79
Ted Romulo del Rio	Independent	20,291	9.33
Total		217,509	100.00
Total votes		165,975	–
Source: Commission on Elections
