= 2025 Philippine local elections in Western Visayas =

- May 12, 2025
- Gubernatorial elections
- 5 provincial governors and 1 city mayor
Party	Seats	+/–
NUP	2	−2
Aksyon	1	New
Lakas	1	0
1-Capiz	1	New
Uswag Ilonggo	1	New
This lists parties that won seats. See the complete results below.
- Vice gubernatorial elections
- 5 provincial vice governors and 1 city vice mayor
Party	Seats	+/–
Lakas	2	+1
NUP	2	0
1-Capiz	1	New
PFP	1	+1
This lists parties that won seats. See the complete results below.
- Provincial Board elections
- 50 provincial board members and 12 city councilors
Party	Seats	+/–
PFP	16	+16
NUP	15	−1
1-Capiz	9	New
Lakas	8	+1
Nacionalista	5	−7
Aksyon	2	0
Liberal	2	−3
NPC	1	−14
Uswag Ilonggo	1	+1
Independent	3	0
This lists parties that won seats. See the complete results below.

The 2025 Philippine local elections in Western Visayas were held on May 12, 2025.

== Summary ==
=== Governors ===
Province/city	Incumbent	Incumbent's party	Winner	Winner's party	Winning margin
Aklan	Jose Enrique Miraflores	Lakas	Jose Enrique Miraflores	Lakas	52.75%
Antique	Rhodora Cadiao	NUP	Paolo Javier	Aksyon	15.05%
Capiz	Fredenil Castro	One Capiz	Fredenil Castro	One Capiz	71.94%
Guimaras	JC Rahman Nava	NUP	Lucille Nava	NUP	89.96%
Iloilo	Arthur Defensor Jr.	Uswag Ilonggo	Arthur Defensor Jr.	Uswag Ilonggo	Unopposed
Iloilo City (HUC)	Jerry Treñas	NUP	Raisa Treñas	NUP	38.74%

=== Vice governors ===
Province/city	Incumbent	Incumbent's party	Winner	Winner's party	Winning margin
Aklan	Boy Quimpo	Lakas	Dexter Calizo	Lakas	0.26%
Antique	Edgar Denosta	Nacionalista	Genevive Reyes	NUP	13.36%
Capiz	Jaime Magbanua	One Capiz	Jaime Magbanua	One Capiz	77.04%
Guimaras	Edward Gando	NUP	Cecille Gumarin	NUP	83.44%
Iloilo	Tingting Garin	Lakas	Nathalie Ann Debuque	PFP	4.42%
Iloilo City (HUC)	Jeffrey Ganzon	PFP	Love Baronda	Lakas	4.38%

=== Provincial boards ===
Province/city	Seats	Party control		Composition
Province/city	Seats	Previous	Result	Composition
Aklan	10 elected 3 ex-officio	No majority	No majority	Lakas (4); PFP (4); Liberal (1); Nacionalista (1)
Antique	10 elected 3 ex-officio	No majority	No majority	NUP (3); Nacionalista (2); Aksyon (2); NPC (1); Independent (2)
Capiz	10 elected 3 ex-officio	No majority	One Capiz	One Capiz (9); PFP (1)
Guimaras	10 elected 3 ex-officio	No majority	NUP	NUP (7); PFP (2); Independent (1)
Iloilo	10 elected 3 ex-officio	No majority	No majority	Lakas (3); PFP (3); Nacionalista (2); Liberal (1); Uswag Ilonggo (1)
Iloilo City (HUC)	12 elected 2 ex-officio	NUP	No majority	PFP (6); NUP (5); Lakas (1)

== Aklan ==
=== Governor ===
Incumbent Governor Jose Enrique Miraflores of Lakas–CMD ran for a second term. He was previously affiliated with PDP–Laban.

Miraflores won re-election against two other candidates.

Candidate	Party	Votes	%
Jose Enrique Miraflores (incumbent)	Lakas–CMD	232,694	74.87
Pier Teodosio	Independent	68,752	22.12
Willie Tolentino	Independent	9,362	3.01
Total		310,808	100.00
Valid votes		310,808	86.06
Invalid/blank votes		50,355	13.94
Total votes		361,163	100.00
Registered voters/turnout		414,890	87.05
Lakas hold			
Source: Commission on Elections

=== Vice Governor ===
Term-limited incumbent Vice Governor Boy Quimpo of Lakas–CMD ran for the Aklan Provincial Board in the 1st provincial district. He was previously affiliated with the Nacionalista Party.

Lakas–CMD nominated Balete mayor Dexter Calizo, who won the election against former Makato mayor Jun Legaspi (Aksyon Demokratiko).

Candidate	Party	Votes	%
Dexter Calizo	Lakas–CMD	151,921	50.13
Jun Legaspi	Aksyon Demokratiko	151,162	49.87
Total		303,083	100.00
Valid votes		303,083	83.92
Invalid/blank votes		58,080	16.08
Total votes		361,163	100.00
Registered voters/turnout		414,890	87.05
Lakas hold			
Source: Commission on Elections

=== Provincial Board ===
The Aklan Provincial Board is composed of 13 board members, 10 of whom are elected.

Lakas–CMD tied with Partido Federal ng Pilipinas at four seats each.

Party	Votes	%	Seats	+/–
Lakas–CMD	364,731	31.79	4	New
Partido Federal ng Pilipinas	346,732	30.22	4	New
Aksyon Demokratiko	146,439	12.76	0	0
Liberal Party	123,632	10.78	1	New
Nacionalista Party	92,199	8.04	1	–3
Pwersa ng Masang Pilipino	49,428	4.31	0	New
Independent	24,053	2.10	0	0
Total	1,147,214	100.00	10	0
Total votes	361,163	–		
Registered voters/turnout	414,890	87.05		
Source: Commission on Elections

==== 1st district ====
Aklan's 1st provincial district consists of the same area as Aklan's 1st legislative district. Five board members are elected from this provincial district.

Nine candidates were included in the ballot.

Candidate	Party	Votes	%
Mark Ace Bautista (incumbent)	Partido Federal ng Pilipinas	90,558	16.61
Boy Quimpo	Lakas–CMD	88,998	16.32
Mark Quimpo (incumbent)	Lakas–CMD	86,430	15.85
Teddy Tupas (incumbent)	Lakas–CMD	66,252	12.15
Apol Cleope (incumbent)	Partido Federal ng Pilipinas	54,434	9.98
Rina Sarceno	Pwersa ng Masang Pilipino	49,428	9.06
Axel Gonzalez	Aksyon Demokratiko	45,880	8.41
Josel Rata	Aksyon Demokratiko	39,250	7.20
Denis Villaruel	Independent	24,053	4.41
Total		545,283	100.00
Total votes		179,381	–
Registered voters/turnout		209,532	85.61
Source: Commission on Elections

==== 2nd district ====
Aklan's 2nd provincial district consists of the same area as Aklan's 2nd legislative district. Five board members are elected from this provincial district.

Nine candidates were included in the ballot.

Candidate	Party	Votes	%
Jose Haresco	Nacionalista Party	92,199	15.32
Lolong Dalisay (incumbent)	Partido Federal ng Pilipinas	74,398	12.36
Jojo Cordova (incumbent)	Lakas–CMD	69,767	11.59
Bubi Legaspi	Liberal Party	69,542	11.55
Jupiter Gallenero (incumbent)	Partido Federal ng Pilipinas	68,247	11.34
Rose Nepomuceno	Aksyon Demokratiko	61,309	10.19
Larry Solidum (incumbent)	Partido Federal ng Pilipinas	59,095	9.82
Rylo Tumbokon	Liberal Party	54,090	8.99
Tingtong Ibarreta	Lakas–CMD	53,284	8.85
Total		601,931	100.00
Total votes		181,782	–
Registered voters/turnout		205,358	88.52
Source: Commission on Elections

== Antique ==
=== Governor ===
Term-limited incumbent Governor Rhodora Cadiao of the National Unity Party ran for the House of Representatives in Antique's lone legislative district.

Cadiao endorsed former Department of the Interior and Local Government undersecretary Jonathan Tan, an independent, who was defeated by former representative Paolo Javier of Aksyon. Antique vice governor Edgar Denosta (Nacionalista Party), and four other candidates also ran for governor.

Candidate	Party	Votes	%
Paolo Javier	Aksyon Demokratiko	147,225	46.39
Jonathan Tan	Independent	99,477	31.34
Edgar Denosta	Nacionalista Party	50,935	16.05
Vic Fedelicio	Independent	16,044	5.06
Gaspar Gayona	Independent	1,545	0.49
Rudy Bantolo	Independent	1,160	0.37
Rodelo Pidoy	Independent	988	0.31
Total		317,374	100.00
Valid votes		317,374	90.56
Invalid/blank votes		33,088	9.44
Total votes		350,462	100.00
Registered voters/turnout		399,553	87.71
Aksyon gain from NUP			
Source: Commission on Elections

=== Vice Governor ===
Term-limited incumbent Vice Governor Edgar Denosta of the Nacionalista Party ran for governor of Antique. He was previously affiliated with the Nationalist People's Coalition.

Denosta endorsed provincial board member Maye Plameras of the Nationalist People's Coalition, who was defeated by Caluya vice mayor Genevive Reyes of the National Unity Party. Former Bureau of Customs deputy commissioner Edward Dy Buco (Partido Federal ng Pilipinas), and Rosario Bantolo (Independent) also ran for vice governor.

Candidate	Party	Votes	%
Genevive Reyes	National Unity Party	143,656	47.75
Maye Plameras	Nationalist People's Coalition	103,479	34.39
Edward Dy Buco	PDP–Laban	50,637	16.83
Rosario Bantolo	Independent	3,083	1.02
Total		300,855	100.00
Valid votes		300,855	85.85
Invalid/blank votes		49,607	14.15
Total votes		350,462	100.00
Registered voters/turnout		399,553	87.71
NUP gain from Nacionalista			
Source: Commission on Elections

=== Provincial Board ===
The Antique Provincial Board is composed of 13 board members, 10 of whom are elected.

The National Unity Party won three seats, securing a plurality in the provincial board.

Party	Votes	%	Seats	+/–
National Unity Party	330,605	29.15	3	New
Nacionalista Party	198,536	17.50	2	New
Nationalist People's Coalition	181,227	15.98	1	–3
Aksyon Demokratiko	160,483	14.15	2	+1
Liberal Party	39,880	3.52	0	New
PDP–Laban	29,362	2.59	0	–3
Lakas-CMD	14,464	1.28	0	–1
Partido Federal ng Pilipinas	14,323	1.26	0	0
Independent	165,443	14.59	2	+1
Total	1,134,323	100.00	10	0
Total votes	350,462	–		
Registered voters/turnout	399,553	87.71		
Source: Commission on Elections

==== 1st district ====
Antique's 1st provincial district consists of the municipalities of Anini-y, Belison, Hamtic, San Jose de Buenavista, San Remigio, Sibalom,Tobias Fornier and Valderrama. Five board members are elected from this provincial district.

Nineteen candidates were included in the ballot.

Candidate	Party	Votes	%
Alfie Jay Niquia	Nationalist People's Coalition	61,648	10.81
Dante Beriong (incumbent)	Independent	50,557	8.86
Vincent Piccio III	Aksyon Demokratiko	50,315	8.82
Berns Tubianosa	Aksyon Demokratiko	46,278	8.11
Nanding Corvera	Nacionalista Party	42,575	7.46
Ade Santillan Fajardo	Liberal Party	39,880	6.99
Mark Baculna	National Unity Party	33,879	5.94
Eduardo Fortaleza	Aksyon Demokratiko	33,353	5.85
Donna Chris Yan	Nationalist People's Coalition	30,561	5.36
Julie Cepe	National Unity Party	30,080	5.27
Bingbing Lotilla	PDP–Laban	29,362	5.15
JC Cadiao Perlas	National Unity Party	27,852	4.88
Steph Seguera Siblag	National Unity Party	21,755	3.81
Tracy Orquia	Nacionalista Party	21,371	3.75
Nick Abarientos	Nacionalista Party	14,752	2.59
Dax Pacificador	Partido Federal ng Pilipinas	14,323	2.51
Jao Ortega	Independent	9,395	1.65
Jun Saiyo	Nacionalista Party	8,767	1.54
Martin Galino	Independent	3,793	0.66
Total		570,496	100.00
Total votes		170,970	–
Registered voters/turnout		194,258	88.01
Source: Commission on Elections

==== 2nd district ====
Antique's 2nd provincial district consists of the municipalities of Barbaza, Bugasong, Caluya, Culasi, Laua-an, Libertad, Pandan, Patnongon, Sebaste and Tibiao. Five board members are elected from this provincial district.

Nineteen candidates were included in the ballot.

Candidate	Party	Votes	%
Milay Dimamay (incumbent)	Independent	83,842	14.87
Gaseva Recopuerto	National Unity Party	53,587	9.50
Sueki Palacios (incumbent)	National Unity Party	49,152	8.72
Nonong Alojipan	National Unity Party	47,293	8.39
Noel Alamis (incumbent)	Nacionalista Party	46,350	8.22
Bobot Santillan	National Unity Party	35,848	6.36
Egidio Elio (incumbent)	Nationalist People's Coalition	35,676	6.33
Nick Calawag	National Unity Party	31,159	5.53
Plaridel Sanchez IV	Nationalist People's Coalition	26,758	4.75
Hector Frangue	Nationalist People's Coalition	26,584	4.71
Wil Solis	Nacionalista Party	21,857	3.88
Ruperto Lavega Jr.	Nacionalista Party	21,649	3.84
Jun Jun Genovata	Nacionalista Party	21,215	3.76
Dong Dong Alonsagay	Aksyon Demokratiko	20,987	3.72
Joe Marie Pesayco	Lakas-CMD	14,464	2.57
Ramon Mosquera	Independent	12,839	2.28
Ricky Orendain	Aksyon Demokratiko	5,795	1.03
Jun Reponte	Independent	5,017	0.89
Edison Biadora	Aksyon Demokratiko	3,755	0.67
Total		563,827	100.00
Total votes		179,492	–
Registered voters/turnout		205,295	87.43
Source: Commission on Elections

== Capiz ==
=== Governor ===
Incumbent Governor Fredenil Castro of One Capiz ran for a second term. He was previously affiliated with Lakas–CMD.

Castro won re-election against former Capiz governor Esteban Evan Contreras (Independent) and Christopher Barrio (Independent).

Candidate	Party	Votes	%
Fredenil Castro (incumbent)	One Capiz	363,221	85.56
Esteban Evan Contreras	Independent	57,828	13.62
Christopher Barrio	Independent	3,483	0.82
Total		424,532	100.00
Valid votes		424,532	91.52
Invalid/blank votes		39,354	8.48
Total votes		463,886	100.00
Registered voters/turnout		539,459	85.99
1-Capiz hold			
Source: Commission on Elections

=== Vice Governor ===
Incumbent Vice Governor Jaime Magbanua of One Capiz ran for a third term. He was previously affiliated with Lakas–CMD.

Magbanua won re-election against former provincial board member Eleuper Martinez (Independent) and Argie Basiao (Independent).

Candidate	Party	Votes	%
Jaime Magbanua (incumbent)	One Capiz	292,932	87.04
Eleuper Martinez	Independent	33,661	10.00
Argie Basiao	Independent	9,954	2.96
Total		336,547	100.00
Valid votes		336,547	72.55
Invalid/blank votes		127,339	27.45
Total votes		463,886	100.00
Registered voters/turnout		539,459	85.99
1-Capiz hold			
Source: Commission on Elections

=== Provincial Board ===
The Capiz Provincial Board is composed of 13 board members, 10 of whom are elected.

One Capiz won nine seats, gaining a majority in the provincial board.

Party	Votes	%	Seats	+/–
One Capiz	1,025,689	76.03	9	New
Partido Federal ng Pilipinas	226,807	16.81	1	+1
Independent	96,606	7.16	0	0
Total	1,349,102	100.00	10	0
Total votes	463,886	–		
Registered voters/turnout	539,459	85.99		
Source: Commission on Elections

==== 1st district ====
Capiz's 1st provincial district consists of the same area as Capiz's 1st legislative district. Five board members are elected from this provincial district.

Nine candidates were included in the ballot.

Candidate	Party	Votes	%
Blesilda Almalbis (incumbent)	One Capiz	123,692	15.86
Tawi Billones Jr.	One Capiz	113,551	14.56
Trina Marie Ignacio (incumbent)	One Capiz	101,745	13.05
Cesar Yap Jr.	One Capiz	94,762	12.15
Pepe del Rosario (incumbent)	Partido Federal ng Pilipinas	93,519	11.99
Thea Faith Reyes (incumbent)	One Capiz	88,513	11.35
Gualberto Bernas III	Partido Federal ng Pilipinas	75,280	9.65
Amy Asis Bermejo	Partido Federal ng Pilipinas	58,008	7.44
Edward Contreras	Independent	30,728	3.94
Total		779,798	100.00
Total votes		249,688	–
Registered voters/turnout		286,934	87.02
Source: Commission on Elections

==== 2nd district ====
Capiz's 2nd provincial district consists of the same area as Capiz's 2nd legislative district. Five board members are elected from this provincial district.

Seven candidates were included in the ballot.

Candidate	Party	Votes	%
Inday San Felix (incumbent)	One Capiz	114,386	20.09
Aldwin Cruz-Am (incumbent)	One Capiz	100,801	17.71
Aying Fundal	One Capiz	100,766	17.70
Gilbert Ardivilla (incumbent)	One Capiz	96,202	16.90
Cecilio Fecundo (incumbent)	One Capiz	91,271	16.03
Victor Tanco Jr.	Independent	51,104	8.98
Averuth Teves	Independent	14,774	2.60
Total		569,304	100.00
Total votes		214,198	–
Registered voters/turnout		252,525	84.82
Source: Commission on Elections

== Guimaras ==
=== Governor ===
Incumbent Governor JC Rahman Nava of the National Unity Party (NUP) ran for the House of Representatives in Guimaras's lone legislative district.

The NUP nominated Nava's wife, Lucille Nava, who won the election against Maggie Cacho (Independent). On February 11, 2025, Maggie Cacho was arrested by the Criminal Investigation and Detection Group of the Philippine National Police for swindling.

Candidate	Party	Votes	%
Lucille Nava	National Unity Party	94,970	94.98
Maggie Cacho	Independent	5,024	5.02
Total		99,994	100.00
Valid votes		99,994	91.61
Invalid/blank votes		9,154	8.39
Total votes		109,148	100.00
Registered voters/turnout		124,930	87.37
NUP hold			
Source: Commission on Elections

=== Vice Governor ===
Term-limited incumbent Vice Governor Edward Gando of the National Unity Party (NUP) ran for mayor of Jordan. He was previously affiliated with PDP–Laban.

The NUP nominated provincial board member Cecile Gumarin, who won the election against Tomas Junco Jr. (Partido Federal ng Pilipinas).

Candidate	Party	Votes	%
Cecille Gumarin	National Unity Party	83,180	91.72
Tomas Junco Jr.	Partido Federal ng Pilipinas	7,512	8.28
Total		90,692	100.00
Valid votes		90,692	83.09
Invalid/blank votes		18,456	16.91
Total votes		109,148	100.00
Registered voters/turnout		124,930	87.37
NUP hold			
Source: Commission on Elections

=== Provincial Board ===
Since Guimaras' reclassification as a 2nd class province, the Guimaras Provincial Board is composed of 13 board members, 10 of whom are elected.

The National Unity Party won seven seats, gaining a majority in the provincial board.

Party	Votes	%	Seats	+/–
National Unity Party	258,513	78.51	7	+4
Partido Federal ng Pilipinas	28,640	8.70	2	+2
Independent	42,102	12.79	1	New
Total	329,255	100.00	10	+2
Total votes	109,148	–		
Registered voters/turnout	124,930	87.37		
Source: Commission on Elections

==== 1st district ====
Guimaras' 1st provincial district consists of the municipalities of Buenavista and San Lorenzo. Four board members are elected from this provincial district.

Eight candidates were included in the ballot.

Candidate	Party	Votes	%
Ariel Zambarrano	National Unity Party	28,681	21.61
Rommel John Edang	Independent	24,954	18.80
Arthur Cartel Jr.	National Unity Party	24,551	18.49
Raymond Gavileño (incumbent)	National Unity Party	22,566	17.00
Boking Habaña (incumbent)	National Unity Party	21,899	16.50
Dag Habaña	Independent	6,471	4.87
Arturo Junco	Independent	2,247	1.69
Carlo Pillora	Partido Federal ng Pilipinas	1,381	1.04
Total		132,750	100.00
Total votes		48,718	–
Registered voters/turnout		55,754	87.38
Source: Commission on Elections

==== 2nd district ====
Guimaras' 2nd provincial district consists of the municipalities of Jordan, Nueva Valencia and Sibunag. Six board members are elected from this provincial district.

Seven candidates were included in the ballot.

Candidate	Party	Votes	%
Nene Nava (incumbent)	National Unity Party	48,360	24.61
Alex Araneta (incumbent)	National Unity Party	40,291	20.50
Paul de la Cruz	National Unity Party	36,878	18.77
Lynlyn Edang (incumbent)	National Unity Party	35,287	17.96
Eros Elevencione	Partido Federal ng Pilipinas	17,755	9.04
Joel Tanaleon	Partido Federal ng Pilipinas	9,504	4.84
Lordito Blanco	Independent	8,430	4.29
Total		196,505	100.00
Total votes		60,430	–
Registered voters/turnout		69,176	87.36
Source: Commission on Elections

== Iloilo ==
=== Governor ===
Incumbent Governor Arthur Defensor Jr. of Uswag Ilonggo won re-election for a third term unopposed. He was previously affiliated with the National Unity Party.

Mary Frances Chloe Noble (Independent) was initially a candidate, but withdrew on December 26, 2024.

Candidate	Party	Votes	%
Arthur Defensor Jr. (incumbent)	Uswag Ilonggo	811,746	100.00
Total		811,746	100.00
Valid votes		811,746	71.47
Invalid/blank votes		323,963	28.53
Total votes		1,135,709	100.00
Registered voters/turnout		1,319,109	86.10
Uswag Ilonggo hold			
Source: Commission on Elections

=== Vice Governor ===
Term-limited incumbent Vice Governor Tingting Garin of Lakas–CMD ran for vice mayor of Guimbal. She was previously affiliated with the Nacionalista Party.

Lakas–CMD nominated representative Raul Tupas, who was defeated by Anilao mayor Nathalie Ann Debuque of the Partido Federal ng Pilipinas. Mark John Velasco (Independent) also ran for vice governor.

Candidate	Party	Votes	%
Nathalie Ann Debuque	Partido Federal ng Pilipinas	547,462	51.95
Raul Tupas	Lakas–CMD	500,863	47.53
Mark John Velasco	Independent	5,500	0.52
Total		1,053,825	100.00
Valid votes		1,053,825	92.79
Invalid/blank votes		81,884	7.21
Total votes		1,135,709	100.00
Registered voters/turnout		1,319,109	86.10
PFP gain from Lakas			
Source: Commission on Elections

=== Provincial Board ===
The Iloilo Provincial Board is composed of 13 board members, 10 of whom are elected.

Lakas–CMD tied with Partido Federal ng Pilipinas at three seats each.

Party	Votes	%	Seats	+/–
Lakas–CMD	506,635	34.98	3	+1
Partido Federal ng Pilipinas	361,509	24.96	3	+3
Nacionalista Party	225,147	15.54	2	–2
Liberal Party	103,426	7.14	1	0
Uswag Ilonggo	100,389	6.93	1	New
Reform PH Party	58,242	4.02	0	New
Bunyog Party	15,872	1.10	0	New
Independent	77,299	5.34	0	0
Total	1,448,519	100.00	10	0
Total votes	1,135,709	–		
Registered voters/turnout	1,319,109	86.10		
Source: Commission on Elections

==== 1st district ====
Iloilo's 1st provincial district consists of the same area as Iloilo's 1st legislative district. Two board members are elected from this provincial district.

Four candidates were included in the ballot.

Candidate	Party	Votes	%
Rica Jane Garin	Lakas–CMD	127,454	44.05
Joan Basco-Germinanda	Lakas–CMD	93,059	32.16
Migs Flores	Independent	53,372	18.45
Elston Saquian	Independent	15,442	5.34
Total		289,327	100.00
Total votes		203,135	–
Registered voters/turnout		234,519	86.62
Source: Commission on Elections

==== 2nd district ====
Iloilo's 2nd provincial district consists of the same area as Iloilo's 2nd legislative district. Two board members are elected from this provincial district.

Two candidates were included in the ballot.

Candidate	Party	Votes	%
June Mondejar (incumbent)	Partido Federal ng Pilipinas	95,361	54.37
Rolito Cajilig (incumbent)	Partido Federal ng Pilipinas	80,036	45.63
Total		175,397	100.00
Total votes		193,187	–
Registered voters/turnout		223,656	86.38
Source: Commission on Elections

==== 3rd district ====
Iloilo's 3rd provincial district consists of the same area as Iloilo's 3rd legislative district. Two board members are elected from this provincial district.

Four candidates were included in the ballot.

Candidate	Party	Votes	%
Mark Palabrica	Partido Federal ng Pilipinas	108,762	37.23
Jason Gonzales (incumbent)	Liberal Party	103,426	35.40
Anthony Margarico	Lakas–CMD	47,532	16.27
ER Palu-ay	Lakas–CMD	32,439	11.10
Total		292,159	100.00
Total votes		230,942	–
Registered voters/turnout		275,733	83.76
Source: Commission on Elections

==== 4th district ====
Iloilo's 4th provincial district consists of the same area as Iloilo's 4th legislative district. Two board members are elected from this provincial district.

Five candidates were included in the ballot.

Candidate	Party	Votes	%
Rolly Distura (incumbent)	Nacionalista Party	124,834	40.56
Dominic Paul Oso	Nacionalista Party	100,313	32.60
Jonathan Pinuela	Reform PH Party	58,242	18.93
Antonio Parcon	Bunyog Party	15,872	5.16
Bimboy Dolar	Independent	8,485	2.76
Total		307,746	100.00
Total votes		233,419	–
Registered voters/turnout		266,462	87.60
Source: Commission on Elections

==== 5th district ====
Iloilo's 5th provincial district consists of the same area as Iloilo's 5th legislative district. Two board members are elected from this provincial district.

Four candidates were included in the ballot.

Candidate	Party	Votes	%
Darl Tupas	Lakas–CMD	118,807	30.95
Rolex Suplico	Uswag Ilonggo	100,389	26.15
Carlo Ong	Lakas–CMD	87,344	22.75
Beng Tupas	Partido Federal ng Pilipinas	77,350	20.15
Total		383,890	100.00
Total votes		275,026	–
Registered voters/turnout		318,739	86.29
Source: Commission on Elections

== Iloilo City ==
=== Mayor ===
Incumbent Mayor Jerry Treñas of the National Unity Party (NUP) retired.

The NUP nominated Treñas' daughter, Raisa Treñas, who won the election against Roland Magahin (Independent).

Candidate	Party	Votes	%
Raisa Treñas	National Unity Party	170,162	69.37
Roland Magahin	Independent	75,139	30.63
Total		245,301	100.00
Valid votes		245,301	92.27
Invalid/blank votes		20,547	7.73
Total votes		265,848	100.00
Registered voters/turnout		330,621	80.41
NUP hold			
Source: Commission on Elections

=== Vice Mayor ===
Incumbent Vice Mayor Jeffrey Ganzon of the Partido Federal ng Pilipinas ran for a third term. He was previously affiliated with the National Unity Party.

Ganzon was defeated by former city councilor Love-Love Baronda of Lakas–CMD.

Candidate	Party	Votes	%
Love-Love Baronda	Lakas–CMD	132,564	52.19
Jeffrey Ganzon (incumbent)	Partido Federal ng Pilipinas	121,453	47.81
Total		254,017	100.00
Valid votes		254,017	95.55
Invalid/blank votes		11,831	4.45
Total votes		265,848	100.00
Registered voters/turnout		330,621	80.41
Lakas gain from PFP			
Source: Commission on Elections

=== City Council ===
The Iloilo City Council is composed of 14 councilors, 12 of whom are elected.

Twenty-nine candidates were included in the ballot.

The Partido Federal ng Pilipinas won six seats, gaining a plurality in the city council.

Party	Votes	%	Seats	+/–
Partido Federal ng Pilipinas	812,343	35.83	6	+6
Lakas–CMD	632,957	27.92	1	New
National Unity Party	590,511	26.05	5	–5
PDP–Laban	16,372	0.72	0	New
Independent	214,752	9.47	0	0
Total	2,266,935	100.00	12	0
Total votes	265,848	–		
Registered voters/turnout	330,621	80.41		
Source: Commission on Elections

Candidate	Party	Votes	%
Sedfrey Cabaluna (incumbent)	National Unity Party	138,449	6.11
Miguel Treñas (incumbent)	Partido Federal ng Pilipinas	134,124	5.92
Rex Marcus Sarabia (incumbent)	National Unity Party	121,194	5.35
Alan Zaldivar (incumbent)	Partido Federal ng Pilipinas	118,490	5.23
Lyndon Acap	National Unity Party	115,487	5.09
Nene dela Llana	Partido Federal ng Pilipinas	113,622	5.01
Mandrie Malabor	National Unity Party	110,140	4.86
Johnny Young (incumbent)	Partido Federal ng Pilipinas	107,004	4.72
Romel Duron (incumbent)	Partido Federal ng Pilipinas	106,432	4.69
Rudolph Ganzon (incumbent)	National Unity Party	105,241	4.64
Sheen Mabilog	Lakas–CMD	104,294	4.60
Frances Grace Parcon-Torres (incumbent)	Partido Federal ng Pilipinas	103,857	4.58
Shiella Olid	Partido Federal ng Pilipinas	93,632	4.13
Bryant Zulueta	Lakas–CMD	86,194	3.80
Boots Gerochi	Lakas–CMD	83,134	3.67
Jun Capulot	Independent	82,368	3.63
Kesha Pesina-Tupas	Lakas–CMD	79,795	3.52
Von Deveza	Lakas–CMD	77,755	3.43
Mor Espinosa	Independent	75,921	3.35
Peter Oñate	Lakas–CMD	69,877	3.08
Stanley Flores	Lakas–CMD	67,907	3.00
GM Ariete Ramos	Lakas–CMD	64,001	2.82
Art Araneta	Independent	30,429	1.34
Jan Barredo	Partido Federal ng Pilipinas	19,227	0.85
Junjun Moleta	Partido Federal ng Pilipinas	15,955	0.70
Abner Batan	Independent	15,832	0.70
Muni Estrella	Independent	10,202	0.45
Efren Gimeo	PDP–Laban	8,376	0.37
Rich Piad	PDP–Laban	7,996	0.35
Total		2,266,935	100.00
Total votes		265,848	–
Registered voters/turnout		330,621	80.41
Source: Commission on Elections
