= 2010 Philippine House of Representatives elections in Western Visayas =

Election in Philippines

Philippine House of Representatives elections in Western Visayas, 2010
- May 10, 2010

16 seats of Western Visayas in the House of Representatives
	First party	Second party
Party	Lakas–Kampi	NPC
Seats won	9	5
Popular vote	942,937	720,685
Percentage	35.20%	26.90%
	Third party	Fourth party
Party	Liberal	Nacionalista
Seats won	2	2
Popular vote	325,302	286,476
Percentage	12.14%	10.69%
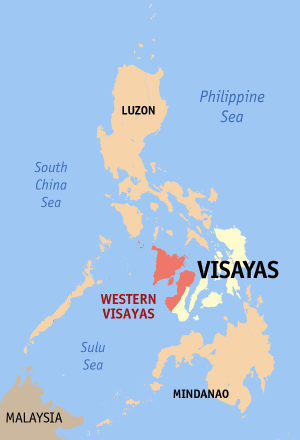
- Location of Western Visayas within the country.

Elections were held in Western Visayas for seats in the House of Representatives of the Philippines on May 10, 2010.

The candidate with the most votes won that district's seat for the 15th Congress of the Philippines.

== Summary ==
Party	Popular vote	%	Seats won
Lakas–Kampi	942,937	35.20%	9
NPC	720,685	26.90%	5
Liberal	325,302	12.14%	2
Nacionalista	286,476	10.69%	2
Ugyon Kita Capiz	45,859	1.71%	0
ATUN	42,796	1.60%	0
KBL	30,741	1.14%	0
PMP	24,105	0.90%	0
PDSP	12,848	0.48%	0
Aksyon	3,443	0.13%	0
LM	838	0.03%	0
Independent	242,924	9.07%	0
Valid votes	2,678,684	88.00%	18
Invalid votes	375,352	12.00%	
Turnout	3,044,036	77.27%	
Registered voters	3,939,435	100.00%	

== Aklan ==
Incumbent Florencio Miraflores is running unopposed.

Candidate	Party	Votes	%
Florencio Miraflores (incumbent)	Lakas–Kampi–CMD	178,190	100.00
Total		178,190	100.00
Valid votes		178,190	72.43
Invalid/blank votes		67,812	27.57
Total votes		246,002	100.00
Lakas–Kampi–CMD			
Source: Commission on Elections

== Antique ==
Incumbent Exequiel Javier is in his third consecutive term already and is ineligible for reelection; his son Paolo Javier is his party's nominee for the district's seat.

Candidate	Party	Votes	%
Paolo Javier	Lakas–Kampi–CMD	93,081	44.97
Salvacion Z. Perez	Nationalist People's Coalition	66,282	32.03
Arturo Pacificador	Kilusang Bagong Lipunan	30,471	14.72
Robert Delfin	Partido Demokratiko Sosyalista ng Pilipinas	12,848	6.21
Narzal Mallares	Aksyon Demokratiko	3,443	1.66
Antero Florante Villaflor Jr.	Lapiang Manggagawa	838	0.40
Total		206,963	100.00
Valid votes		206,963	88.22
Invalid/blank votes		27,628	11.78
Total votes		234,591	100.00
Lakas–Kampi–CMD hold			
Source: Commission on Elections

== Bacolod ==
Incumbent Monico Puentevella is in his third consecutive term already and is ineligible for reelection; he will run as mayor of Bacolod as Lakas-Kampi-CMD nominated Ricardo Tan in his place. He will face former Deputy Presidential Spokesperson Anthony Golez running under the Nationalist People's Coalition.

Candidate	Party	Votes	%
Anthony Golez	Nationalist People's Coalition	58,708	30.84
Renecito Novero	Independent	45,083	23.68
Ricardo Tan	Lakas–Kampi–CMD	37,310	19.60
Juan Orola Jr.	Independent	31,127	16.35
Jocelle Batapa-Sigue	Independent	17,728	9.31
Ramon dela Cruz	Independent	408	0.21
Total		190,364	100.00
Valid votes		190,364	92.73
Invalid/blank votes		14,918	7.27
Total votes		205,282	100.00
Nationalist People's Coalition gain from Lakas–Kampi–CMD			
Source: Commission on Elections

== Capiz ==
=== 1st District ===
Antonio Del Rosario is the incumbent.

Candidate	Party	Votes	%
Antonio del Rosario (incumbent)	Liberal Party	77,584	46.72
Felipe Barredo	Ugyon Kita Capiz	45,859	27.62
Rodriguez Dadivas	Independent	41,205	24.82
Conrado Tinsay II	Independent	1,397	0.84
Total		166,045	100.00
Valid votes		166,045	92.87
Invalid/blank votes		12,752	7.13
Total votes		178,797	100.00
Liberal Party hold			
Source: Commission on Elections

=== 2nd District ===
Incumbent Fredenil Castro is in his third consecutive term already and is ineligible for reelection; his wife Jane is his party's nominee for the district's seat.

Candidate	Party	Votes	%
Jane Castro	Lakas–Kampi–CMD	109,147	69.51
Roberto Lastimoso	Liberal Party	47,885	30.49
Total		157,032	100.00
Valid votes		157,032	95.07
Invalid/blank votes		8,148	4.93
Total votes		165,180	100.00
Lakas–Kampi–CMD hold			
Source: Commission on Elections

== Guimaras ==
JC Rahman Nava is the incumbent.

Candidate	Party	Votes	%
JC Rahman Nava (incumbent)	Lakas–Kampi–CMD	63,941	90.97
Tomas Junco Jr.	Pwersa ng Masang Pilipino	6,350	9.03
Total		70,291	100.00
Valid votes		70,291	91.66
Invalid/blank votes		6,399	8.34
Total votes		76,690	100.00
Lakas–Kampi–CMD hold			
Source: Commission on Elections

== Iloilo ==
=== 1st District ===
Incumbent Janette Garin is running unopposed.

Candidate	Party	Votes	%
Janette Garin (incumbent)	Lakas–Kampi–CMD	111,947	100.00
Total		111,947	100.00
Valid votes		111,947	74.72
Invalid/blank votes		37,868	25.28
Total votes		149,815	100.00
Lakas–Kampi–CMD hold			
Source: Commission on Elections

=== 2nd District ===
Incumbent Judy Syjuco is not running; her husband Technical Education and Skills Development Authority Secretary Augusto Syjuco Jr. is her party's nominee for the district's seat.

Candidate	Party	Votes	%
Augusto Syjuco Jr.	Lakas–Kampi–CMD	79,843	63.11
Ramon Arenas Jr.	Nationalist People's Coalition	43,654	34.50
Diopito Gonzales	Independent	3,027	2.39
Total		126,524	100.00
Valid votes		126,524	91.63
Invalid/blank votes		11,558	8.37
Total votes		138,082	100.00
Lakas–Kampi–CMD hold			
Source: Commission on Elections

=== 3rd District ===
Incumbent Arthur Defensor Sr. is in his third consecutive term already and is ineligible for reelection and running for governor of Iloilo; his son outgoing 3rd district board member Arthur Jr. is his party's nominee for the district's seat.

Candidate	Party	Votes	%
Arthur Defensor Jr.	Lakas–Kampi–CMD	89,960	55.59
Rene Villa	Liberal Party	54,117	33.44
Zafiro Lauron	Pwersa ng Masang Pilipino	17,755	10.97
Total		161,832	100.00
Valid votes		161,832	94.75
Invalid/blank votes		8,964	5.25
Total votes		170,796	100.00
Lakas–Kampi–CMD hold			
Source: Commission on Elections

=== 4th District ===
Incumbent Ferjenel Biron will face outgoing governor Niel Tupas Sr..

Candidate	Party	Votes	%
Ferjenel Biron (incumbent)	Nacionalista Party	106,303	64.60
Niel Tupas Sr.	Liberal Party	58,261	35.40
Total		164,564	100.00
Valid votes		164,564	96.72
Invalid/blank votes		5,576	3.28
Total votes		170,140	100.00
Nacionalista Party hold			
Source: Commission on Elections

=== 5th District ===
Niel Tupas Jr. is the incumbent will face outgoing vice governor and former representative Rolex Suplico.

Candidate	Party	Votes	%
Niel Tupas Jr. (incumbent)	Liberal Party	87,455	52.41
Rolex Suplico	Nacionalista Party	78,869	47.27
Raul Alba	Nationalist People's Coalition	541	0.32
Total		166,865	100.00
Valid votes		166,865	95.21
Invalid/blank votes		8,388	4.79
Total votes		175,253	100.00
Liberal Party hold			
Source: Commission on Elections

== Iloilo City ==
Raul Gonzalez Jr. is the incumbent. And he will face outgoing Iloilo City Mayor Jerry Treñas

The result of the election is under protest in the House of Representatives Electoral Tribunal.

Candidate	Party	Votes	%
Jerry Treñas	Nacionalista Party	101,304	54.77
Raul Gonzalez Jr. (incumbent)	Lakas–Kampi	76,478	41.35
Mansueto Malabor	Independent	6,838	3.70
Juanito Gaje	Independent	335	0.18
Total		184,955	100.00
Valid votes		184,955	95.76
Invalid/blank votes		8,198	4.24
Total votes		193,153	100.00
Nacionalista Party gain from Lakas–Kampi–CMD			
Source: ibanangayon.ph

== Negros Occidental ==
=== 1st District ===
Jules Ledesma is the incumbent.

Candidate	Party	Votes	%
Jules Ledesma (incumbent)	Nationalist People's Coalition	123,970	94.01
Ernesto Librando	Independent	7,904	5.99
Total		131,874	100.00
Valid votes		131,874	83.79
Invalid/blank votes		25,514	16.21
Total votes		157,388	100.00
Nationalist People's Coalition hold			
Source: Commission on Elections

=== 2nd District ===
Alfredo Marañon III is the incumbent.

Candidate	Party	Votes	%
Alfredo Marañon III (incumbent)	Lakas–Kampi–CMD	86,397	83.29
Oscar Arias	Aton Tandon Utod Negrosanon	17,337	16.71
Total		103,734	100.00
Valid votes		103,734	77.93
Invalid/blank votes		29,370	22.07
Total votes		133,104	100.00
Lakas–Kampi–CMD hold			
Source: Commission on Elections

=== 3rd District ===
Incumbent Jose Carlos Lacson is not running; his party Lakas-Kampi-CMD did not name a nominee to run in this district.

Candidate	Party	Votes	%
Albee Benitez	Nationalist People's Coalition	116,772	62.21
Esteban Coscolluela	Independent	40,602	21.63
Ted Victor Jimenez	Independent	30,325	16.16
Total		187,699	100.00
Valid votes		187,699	92.05
Invalid/blank votes		16,219	7.95
Total votes		203,918	100.00
Nationalist People's Coalition gain from Lakas–Kampi–CMD			
Source: Commission on Elections

=== 4th District ===
Incumbent Jeffrey Ferrer is running unopposed.

Candidate	Party	Votes	%
Jeffrey Ferrer (incumbent)	Nationalist People's Coalition	131,338	100.00
Total		131,338	100.00
Valid votes		131,338	81.95
Invalid/blank votes		28,928	18.05
Total votes		160,266	100.00
Nationalist People's Coalition hold			
Source: Commission on Elections

=== 5th District ===
Iggy Arroyo is the incumbent.

Candidate	Party	Votes	%
Iggy Arroyo (incumbent)	Lakas–Kampi–CMD	117,894	87.43
Rodolfo Magalona	Independent	16,945	12.57
Total		134,839	100.00
Valid votes		134,839	78.96
Invalid/blank votes		35,932	21.04
Total votes		170,771	100.00
Lakas–Kampi–CMD hold			
Source: Commission on Elections

=== 6th District ===
Incumbent Genero Alvarez Jr. is running as vice governor of Negros Occidental; his party nominated his daughter Mercedes as their nominee for the district's seat.

Candidate	Party	Votes	%
Mercedes Alvarez	Nationalist People's Coalition	115,479	81.94
Philip Arles	Aton Tandon Utod Negrosanon	25,459	18.06
Total		140,938	100.00
Valid votes		140,938	84.92
Invalid/blank votes		25,037	15.08
Total votes		165,975	100.00
Nationalist People's Coalition hold			
Source: Commission on Elections
