= Calixto Zaldivar =

Filipino lawyer and politician

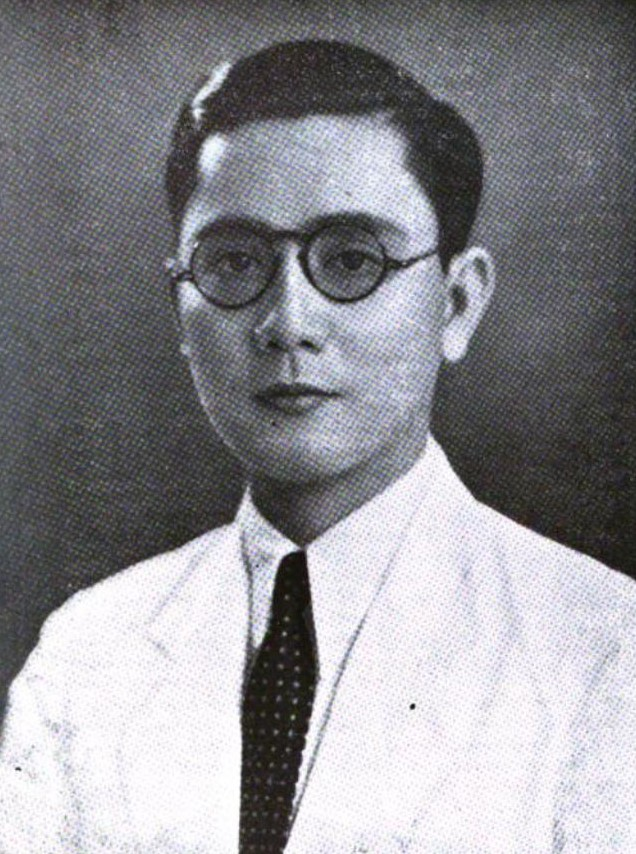
- Photograph from The Commercial & Industrial Manual of the Philippines, 1941

75th Associate Justice of the Supreme Court of the Philippines
- In office September 12, 1964 – September 13, 1974
- Appointed by: Diosdado Macapagal
- Preceded by: Alejo Labrador
- Succeeded by: Hermogenes Concepcion Jr.

Governor of Antique
- In office December 30, 1951 – December 30, 1955
- Preceded by: Tobias Fornier
- Succeeded by: Josue Lacson Cadiao

Member of the National Assembly from Antique's lone district Member of the House of Representatives of the Philippine Islands (1934–1935)
- In office June 5, 1934 – December 30, 1941
- Preceded by: Segundo C. Moscoso
- Succeeded by: Alberto A. Villavert; Tobias Fornier (ex officio)

Municipal Councilor of Pandan, Antique
- In office 1928–1931

Personal details
- Born: Calixto Oirola Zaldivar; September 13, 1904 Pandan, Antique, Philippine Islands
- Died: October 13, 1979 (aged 75)
- Party: Nacionalista
- Spouse: Elena Torres Ang
- Children: 5 (including Salvacion Z. Perez)
- Education: University of the Philippines
- Profession: Lawyer

Calixto Oirola Zaldivar (September 13, 1904 – October 13, 1979) was a Filipino lawyer and politician who was a Supreme Court Justice from 1964 to 1974 best known in Philippine history for being one of only four dissenting voices against the constitutionality of the Philippines' 1973 constitution in the 1973 case known as Javellana v. Executive Secretary, despite pressure by the authoritarian government of Ferdinand Marcos to vote in the constitution's favor.

He is honored by having his name inscribed on the wall of remembrance at the Philippines' Bantayog ng mga Bayani, which honors "the heroes and martyrs who fought against the Marcos dictatorship."

== Early life and education ==
Zaldivar was born in Pandan, Antique, to Pedro Telmo Gella Zaldivar, a former Justice of the Peace in Pandan, and Manuela Palacios Ledesma of Culasi. He later was adopted by his father's sister Salvacion and her husband Enrique Gella Oirola (who was also his father's cousin). According to his descendants, he retained his original surname then used the adoptive (Oirola) as his middle name, in honor of his foster parents. He graduated in law from the University of the Philippines in 1928 and was the third placer in that year's bar examination.

== Career ==
Zaldivar's career in Philippine government was unusual in that he held positions in all branches of the government. In the Legislative, he was elected as a municipal councilor of Pandan from 1928 to 1934 and served as a Representative of Antique from 1934 to 1941; in the Executive branch, as Governor of Antique from 1951 to 1955 and as assistant and then acting Executive Secretary of President Diosdado Macapagal in 1964; and in the judiciary, as Associate Justice of the Supreme Court from 1964 to 1974.

=== Dissenting opinion against Martial Law ===
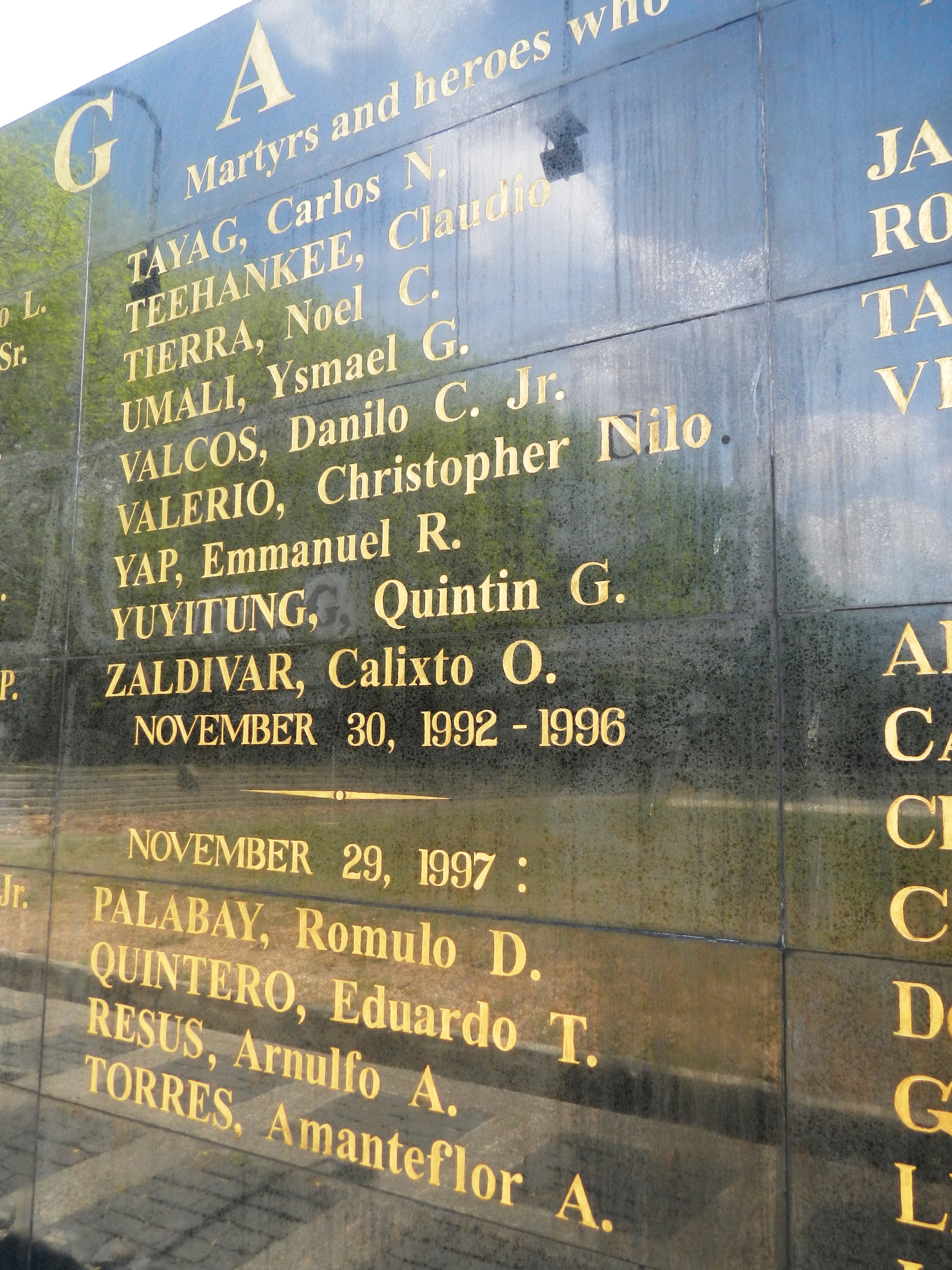
Detail of the Wall of Remembrance at the Bantayog ng mga Bayani, showing names from the first batch of Bantayog Honorees, including that of Calixto Zaldivar

Zaldivar, along with Chief Justice Roberto Concepcion, were the dissenting voices during the deliberations on the issues arising out of the declaration of the Martial Law and the validity of the 1973 Constitution. They argued that the 1973 Constitution was not in force and effect because it was not validly ratified by the Filipino people. Despite pressure to agree to a ruling that would legitimize the Martial law government of Ferdinand Marcos and his ideology of constitutional authoritarianism, Zaldivar and Concepcion persisted in their dissent.

His positions as part of the Philippine Supreme Court emphasized civil and political liberties at a time when their value was being questioned, and he was known for being a proponent of the social sciences, religion, law, government, and statesmanship.
