= Jovito Plameras Jr. =

Filipino politician (1934–2018)

Jovito Chavaro Plameras Jr. (28 September 1934 – 31 July 2018) was a Filipino politician.

Plameras was first elected governor of Antique in 1984 and stepped down in 1998 to contest a seat on the House of Representatives. He served in the twelfth congress as a member of the Laban ng Makabayang Masang Pilipino, representing the legislative district of Antique. In 1997, Plameras, as Antique governor, had acquired ₱5.6 million worth of school supplies on behalf of the Department of Education, Culture and Sports for use in the province of Antique. CKL Enterprises was permitted to fulfill the order without bidding. Additionally, payment was exchanged prior to the complete delivery of the items, many of which were defective. The Sandiganbayan ruled on 2 December 2008 that Plameras was to serve a sentence between six years and one month or ten years imprisonment. The final decision was upheld on 11 March 2014. However, Plameras suffered a stroke and paralysis, and was subsequently placed under house arrest in April 2015. In 2016, Plameras sought a presidential pardon from Benigno Aquino III, which was not granted. Aquino's successor Rodrigo Duterte approved the request in December, given that Plameras repay the Antique provincial government ₱2.65 million.

Plameras died at the age of 83 on 31 July 2018, at the Antique Medical Center in San Jose de Buenavista.
