= Evelio Javier =

Filipino lawyer and politician (1942–1986)

The Honorable Evelio B. Javier
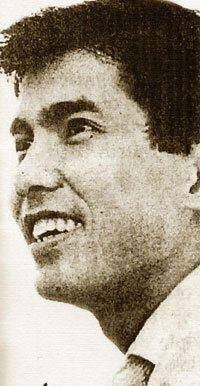

Governor of Antique
- In office December 30, 1971 – January 30, 1980
- Preceded by: Julian Pacificador
- Succeeded by: Enrique Zaldivar

Mambabatas Pambansa (Assemblyman) from Antique
- Died before being declared the winner
- Preceded by: Arturo Pacificador
- Succeeded by: Exequiel Javier (as Representative)

Personal details
- Born: October 31, 1942 Hamtic, Antique, Commonwealth of the Philippines
- Died: February 11, 1986 (aged 43) San Jose de Buenavista, Antique, Philippines
- Cause of death: Assassination
- Party: UNIDO (1980–1986); Laban (1978–1986); Liberal (1971–1986)
- Spouse: Precious Bello Lotilla (m. 1968)
- Relations: Exequiel Javier (brother)
- Children: 2
- Relatives: Paolo Javier (nephew)
- Education: Ateneo de Manila University (BA, LL.B.); Harvard University (MPA)
- Occupation: Civil servant
- Profession: Lawyer

Evelio Bellaflor Javier (October 31, 1942 – February 11, 1986) was a Filipino lawyer and politician. He served as governor of the province of Antique and was an opponent of the dictatorship of President Ferdinand Marcos. His assassination on February 11, 1986, was one of the causes of the People Power Revolution that overthrew Marcos. Evelio Javier's brother, Exequiel Javier, served as congressman from 1987 to 1998 and from 2001 to 2010 and governor from 1998 to 2001, and 2010 to 2015. In 2018, Javier was identified as a Motu Proprio human rights violations victim of the Martial Law Era by the Human Rights Victims Claims Board.

== Early life and marriage ==
Evelio Bellaflor Javier was born on October 31, 1942, in Barangay Lanag (now Evelio Javier), Hamtic, Antique, to Everardo Autajay Javier (Moscoso), a prosecutor and Feliza Bellaflor, a teacher. He finished grade school in San Jose Elementary School in San Jose de Buenavista, Antique and graduated high school with first honors and college in Ateneo de Manila University. There, he received his Bachelor of Arts degree in History and Government and he earned his Bachelor of Laws at Ateneo Law School in 1968. He passed the bar examination in 1968 before he became a college professor at the Ateneo, a successful lawyer, and entered politics.

He married Precious Bello Lotilla, daughter of Vicente Lotilla and Angelina Bello of Sibalom, Antique in Manila on December 29, 1968. They first met in 1958 at San Jose Airport and were reintroduced in 1962. They had two sons, Francis Gideon and David Ignatius. Raphael Lotilla, the incumbent Energy Secretary, is his nephew-in-law.

== Governor of Antique ==
Javier ran for governor of Antique and won in 1971 by one of the largest margins in history, making him, at the age of 28, the Philippines' youngest governor at that time. He did not run again for election in 1980. Instead, he attended the John F. Kennedy School of Government at Harvard University in 1981 on a scholarship, where he earned a Masters in Public Administration.

== May 1984 elections; Sibalom Bridge Massacre ==
In 1984, Javier ran for a seat in the Regular Batasang Pambansa to represent Antique's lone district, but lost. He was known to be a crowd favorite wherein he won the hearts of the people of his province. Arturo Pacificador, a member of the Kilusang Bagong Lipunan (KBL) party, was his competition who was known to have a lot of powerful people who supported him.

The heat of the competition between the two climaxed during the eve of the elections on May 13, 1984. Seven of Javier's supporters were killed in what came to be known as the Sibalom Bridge Massacre, with one survivor, 55-year-old Luna Sanchez, managing to escape and Javier's opponent Pacificador being spotted at the scene by eyewitnesses. This, along with the massive election fraud, prompted Javier's filing of a protest at the Supreme Court.

During the time of the elections, it was known that there were a lot of methods to compromise the voting results such as vote-buying and giving threats to voters. This did not only happen on the national level of elections, but also on the local elections. In the province of Antique, ballots of those who voted in the towns of Caluya, Cabate, Tibiao, Barbaza, Laua-an, and San Remigio were not placed in the boxes.

Javier became the provincial chairman of UNIDO-Laban. Being a critic of the Marcos administration, he campaigned for his opponent Corazon Aquino and her running mate Salvador Laurel in the 1986 snap elections.

After the counting of the ballots, Pacificador won as the assemblyman for Antique. However, Javier asked to rebuke the decision of the commission due to suspicions of compromising the results of the elections, which the Supreme Court eventually decided in his favor on September 22, 1986, seven months after his death and six months after the end of the Regular Batasang Pambansa.

== Assassination and legacy ==
National historical marker installed in 2006 at Javier's namesake park in San Jose

At 10:00 in the morning of February 11, 1986, three or four masked gunmen riding in a Nissan Patrol jeep went to the New Capitol building in San Jose de Buenavista, Antique. While Javier was talking to friends on the steps in front of the capitol building, the masked gunmen opened fire. Time described the scene:

Evelio Javier, director of Corazon Aquino's campaign in the remote province of Antique, was sitting on the lawn in front of the capital building, taking a break from a debate over contested votes in his region, when a white vehicle pulled into the driveway. Without warning, a man in a black knit ski mask leaped out and started shooting. Javier jumped up and ran. Zigzagging across the building's broad concrete plaza, he tried to escape the relentless barrage of bullets. At least one hit its mark. Javier stumbled and fell into a small fishpond. Somehow, though, the fleeing man struggled to his feet and staggered across the street. By this time, other gunmen had begun to close in. Two approached from the left. Another, brandishing a .45 pistol, appeared in front of a warehouse. Javier ducked into an alley and tried to hide behind an outhouse door. But the masked killer found his prey and finished him off with a burst of gunfire.

The toilet was owned by Leon Pe. The News Today at the 20th anniversary reported, "As the prostrated corpse of Javier lied on the damp cement of the comfort room, another gunman, hankering for a kill, unmasked himself and made a shrill outcry - 'Can you recognize me? Stand up and fight!' Whereupon he fired the coup de grace directed at the head..." His body had 24 bullet wounds.

Time reported that many in Javier's camp blamed Pacificador for the assassination:

Opposition leaders and many residents immediately claimed they knew who was behind the killing: Arturo Pacificador, a Marcos crony who is assistant majority floor leader in the National Assembly. Pacificador has operated like a warlord in Antique, wielding political patronage with his connections in the ruling party and the power he has amassed under Marcos.... He won his seat in the National Assembly by beating Javier in one of the most controversial campaigns of the 1984 election. On the eve of the voting, seven Javier supporters were killed during a shoot-out with Pacificador and his followers. The Ministry of Justice investigated, but never released its findings.

On the day of his burial in San Jose de Buenavista, Antique, thousands of mourners followed his funeral procession to the cemetery wearing yellow shirts with yellow bands tied to their wrists. They played his favorite song, "The Impossible Dream", during the procession to the cemetery. Thousands of Antiquenos there showed their anger and sorrow by crying "Justice for Evelio! We love you!" on the day of his death.

A ledger from Ferdinand and Imelda Marcos obtained by the Los Angeles Times in 1990 showed that Arturo Pacificador, Javier's political opponent, received ₱1 million from the Marcoses five days after his killing.

== Murder case ==
After Javier's assassination, his family filed charges against Pacificador, while the Ministry of Justice filed charges against the gunmen. By October 1986, the accusation consisted of 19 people; two noteworthy ones were Javier's rival Pacificador, and Avelino Javellana, his lawyer. Of these 19, at the time only 6 were apprehended and all others were at large including both Pacifador and Javellana. Two of the apprehended, Romeo Nagalese and Jose Delumen, had confessed to the crime and Nagalase was discharged to be used as a witness. On July 1, 1987, one of the main suspects in the case, Edgardo Iran, died during a shootout with the Cavite PC Command in Kawit, Cavite. In May 1989, Javellana was arrested, but on his pleas of health and safety was not held in Antique jail, but to be followed by two police escorts to Iloilo Mission Hospital. However, before they could be transferred, the two police officers were recalled by an unforeseen emergency and was instead escorted by the Provincial Probation Officer of Antique. One of the apprehended Oscar Tianzon pleaded not guilty and Javellana requested a right of bail, however opposition was made based on that charges of murder are not given the right of bail if evidence is strong. Tianzon was requested to be discharged as a witness as he acted as a lookout for the murder and the petition for bail was delayed until this could be resolved. The request was denied and Javellana's right to bail was ruled as:

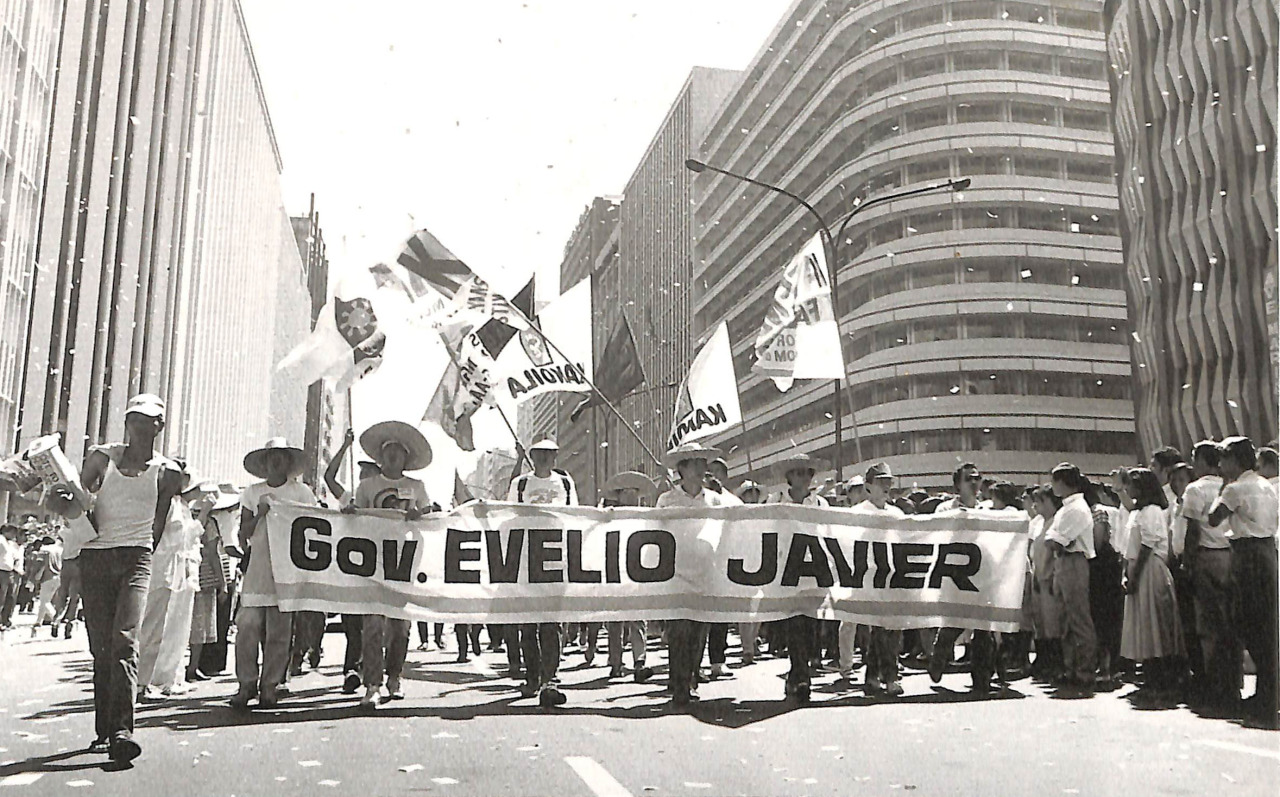
Men gathered in the streets days after Javier's death that helped in the start of the People Power Revolution

"The court searched the records for evidence to corroborate the material points in the aforesaid testimony of Tianzon against Javellana but found none to corroborate his statement pointing to Javellana as the gun supplier and the plotter. Neither has the prosecution presented evidence during the hearing to determine Tianzon's qualification tending to corroborate the implication of Javellana nor did the prosecution indicate to the court where such corroboration can be found by the court."

Further showing the presiding judge was biased towards the accused was that despite allowing Nagales to be discharged he was not used as witness to two other defendants and their cases were dismissed. The trials were suspended in 1989 when the presiding judge was accused of partiality and the Supreme Court issued a temporary restraining order. Petitions were made to resume the trials but these were denied in that light of the events of people power that it has become moot and academic. During this time, Javellana was placed under house arrest under Atty. Deogracias del Rosario. In 1995, Pacificador had resurfaced and was detained. Despite his detainment, Pacificador ran for governor of Antique in the 1995 election, but he lost by a wide margin to Exequiel Javier. Pacificador as well had petitioned for bail and was granted so in 1996. As with above this judge had ignored the witnesses claims and even Pacificador's own admission to being in the ambush site. In the 2000s, trials were once again opened for both of them, but these trials were once again suspended when Pacificador accused the judge of being biased against them. In 2004, the Antique Regional Trial Court acquitted Pacificador and three co-accused. However, Javellana and the others were convicted.

== People Power Revolution ==
The assassination of Javier fueled the People Power Revolution that happened weeks later on February 22, 1986, which ousted Ferdinand Marcos and made Corazon Aquino the President of the Philippines. Javier's body processed through Manila, passing Ateneo de Manila University in Quezon City, where he had thousands of friends and colleagues, days before the revolution.

== Legacy ==
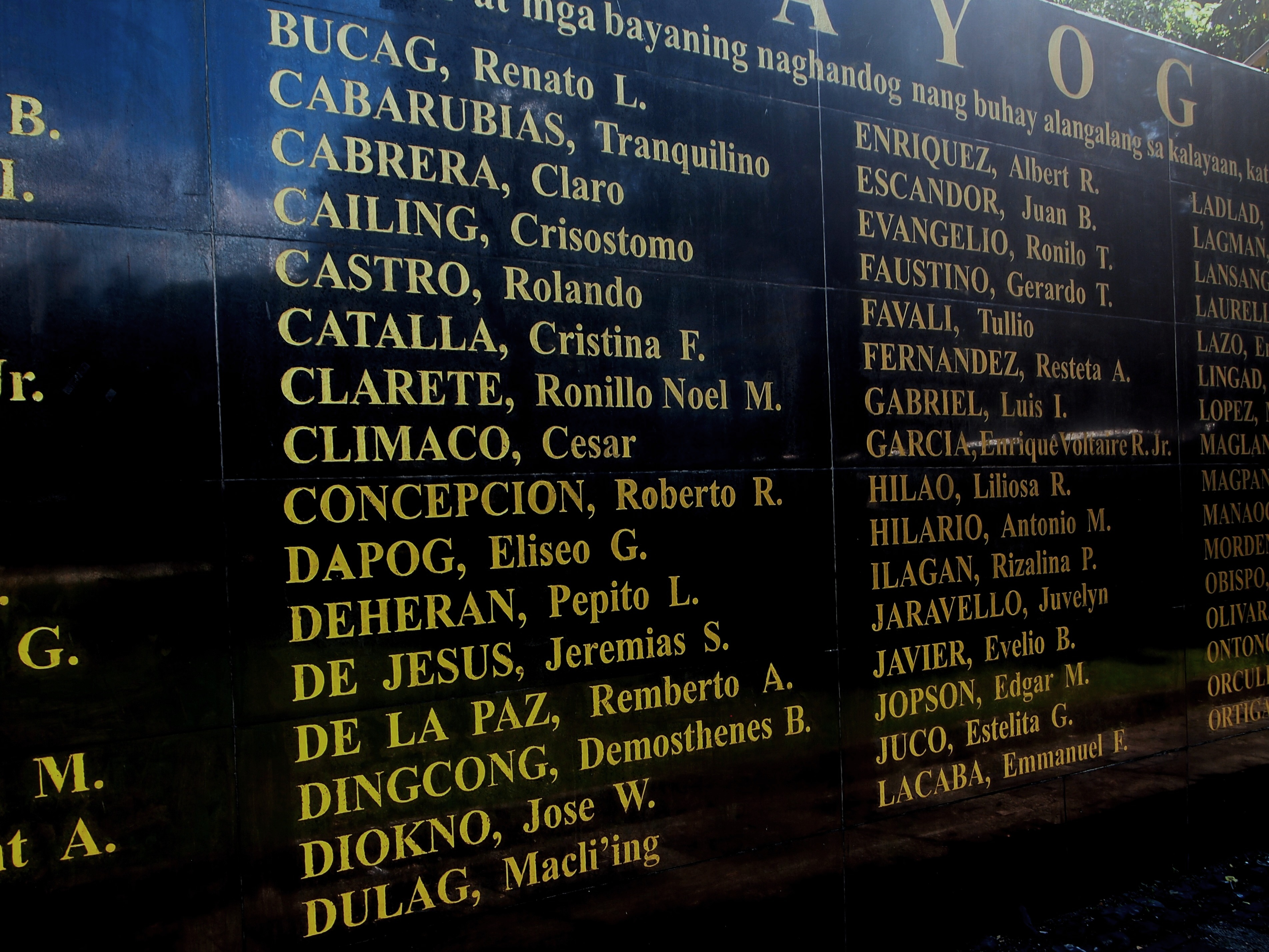
Detail of the Wall of Remembrance at the Bantayog ng mga Bayani, showing names from the first batch of Bantayog Honorees, including that of Evelio Javier.

The day of his assassination is now marked as Governor Evelio B. Javier Day and is a special non-working public holiday in the provinces of Antique, Aklan, Capiz and Iloilo, the four provinces on Panay island.

In September 1986, Supreme Court Associate Justice Isagani Cruz wrote about Javier at the end of his decision in Javier vs. COMELEC:

Let us first say these meager words in tribute to a fallen hero who was struck down in the vigor of his youth because he dared to speak against tyranny. Where many kept a meekly silence for fear of retaliation and still others feigned and fawned in hopes of safety and even reward, he chose to fight. He was not afraid. Money did not tempt him. Threats did not daunt him. Power did not awe him. His was a singular and all-exacting obsession: the return of freedom to his country. And though he fought not in the barricades of war amid the sound and smoke of shot and shell, he was a soldier nonetheless, fighting valiantly for the liberties of his people against the enemies of his race, unfortunately, of his race too, who would impose upon the land a perpetual night of dark enslavement. He did not see the breaking of dawn, sad to say, but in the very real sense Evelio B. Javier made that dawn draw nearer because he was, like Saul and Jonathan, "swifter than eagles and stronger than lions."

An airport, Evelio Javier Airport, in San Jose, Antique, was named in honor of Javier.

In 1992, Javier was one of the first individuals to be honored at the Bantayog ng mga Bayani, a monument dedicated to those who opposed the dictatorship of Ferdinand Marcos.
