= Paolo Javier =

Filipino politician

The Honorable Paolo Everardo Javier
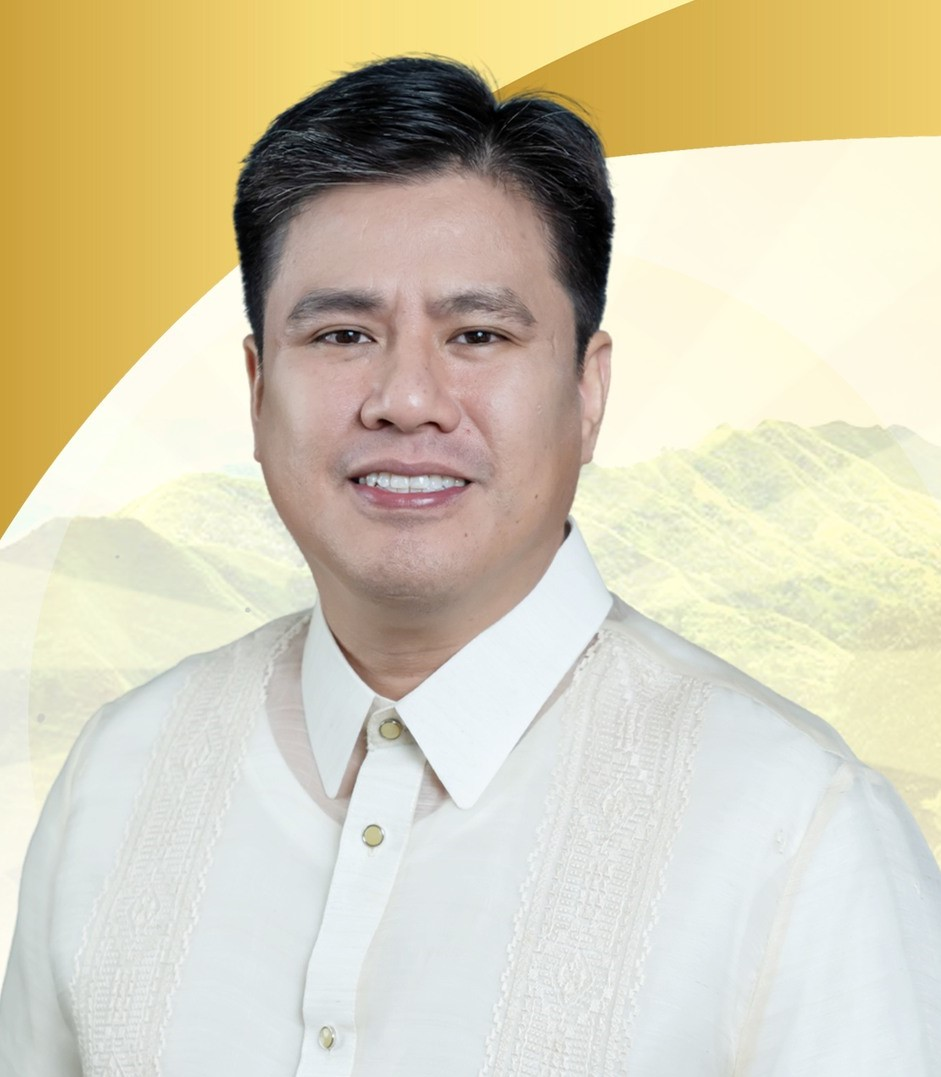
- Official portrait, 2025

18th Governor of Antique
- Incumbent
- Assumed office June 30, 2025
- Vice Governor: Genevive L. Reyes
- Preceded by: Rhodora Cadiao

Member of the Philippine House of Representatives from Antique's Lone District
- In office June 30, 2010 – June 30, 2019
- Preceded by: Exequiel Javier
- Succeeded by: Loren Legarda

Personal details
- Born: Paolo Everardo Sales Javier; January 17, 1981 (age 45) Manila, Philippines
- Party: Aksyon Demokratiko (2024–present)
- Other political affiliations: PDP–Laban (2017–2024); Liberal (2009–2017)
- Parent: Exequiel Javier (father)
- Relatives: Evelio Javier (uncle)
- Occupation: Politician
- Profession: Businessman

Paolo Everardo Sales Javier (born January 17, 1981) is a Filipino politician currently serves as the Governor of Antique since June 30, 2025. He served three terms as a Member of the House of Representatives, representing the Lone District of Antique from 2010 to 2019.

After his 3 terms in congress, in 2019 he decided to ran for governor but defeated by Rhodora Cadiao. He joined Aksyon Demokratiko in 2024 for running governor, campaigned on his "4 E’s": Effective, Efficient, Economical, with Empathy.

He won in a 7-way race (104,876 votes), making another Javier elected in governorship after his father. He defeated DILG Usec. Jonathan Tan (69,328 votes) and Vice Gov. Edgar Denosta (38,777 votes). After being elected, he promised to release the salary for contractual hospital workers.
