= Exequiel Javier =

Filipino politician

The Honorable Exequiel B. Javier
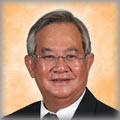
- Official portrait, 2007

18th Governor of Antique
- In office June 30, 2010 – February 3, 2015
- Vice Governor: Rosie Dimamay (2010–2013); Rhodora Cadiao (2013–2015)
- Preceded by: Salvacion Z. Perez
- Succeeded by: Rhodora Cadiao
- In office June 30, 1998 – June 30, 2001
- Preceded by: Jovito Plameras Jr.
- Succeeded by: Salvacion Z. Perez

Member of the Philippine House of Representatives from Antique's Lone District
- In office June 30, 2001 – June 30, 2010
- Preceded by: Jovito Plameras Jr.
- Succeeded by: Paolo Everardo Javier
- In office June 30, 1987 – June 30, 1998
- Preceded by: Arturo Pacificador (as Assemblyman, de facto); Evelio Javier (as Assemblyman, de jure)
- Succeeded by: Jovito Plameras Jr.

Personal details
- Born: October 16, 1946 (age 79) Hamtic, Antique, Philippines
- Party: Independent (1987-1992; 2018-present)
- Other political affiliations: Liberal (2012–2018); Lakas (1992–2012)
- Relations: Evelio Javier (brother)
- Children: Paolo Everardo Javier
- Education: Ateneo de Manila University; New York University
- Occupation: Politician
- Profession: Lawyer

Exequiel Bellaflor Javier (born October 16, 1946) is a Filipino politician and lawyer. He served six terms as a Member of the House of Representatives, representing the Lone District of Antique from 1987 to 1998, and from 2001 to 2010. He has also served as the governor of the province of Antique. He is currently partner at the Romulo Mabanta Buenaventura Sayoc & de los Angeles law firm.

A graduate of the Ateneo de Manila Law School, Javier is the younger brother of Antique governor Evelio Javier, a political ally of Corazon Aquino who was assassinated during Aquino's presidential campaign in 1986. Javier himself was elected to one term as Antique governor, serving from 1998 to 2001. In three successive elections, his foe Arturo Pacificador tried to gain back his seat he had lost when he was ousted in the People Power Revolution, but lost.

On February 3, 2015, Javier was formally removed from office by the Department of the Interior and Local Government (DILG) and Commission on Elections (Comelec) for violating the Omnibus Election Code when he ordered the suspension of Valderrama Mayor Mary Joyce Roquero during the 2013 election period.

House of Representatives of the Philippines
Preceded by Arturo Pacificador de facto as Assemblyman	Representative, Lone District of Antique; 1987–1998	Succeeded by Jovito Plameras Jr.
Preceded by Evelio Javier de jure – posthumous as Assemblyman	Representative, Lone District of Antique; 1987–1998	Succeeded by Jovito Plameras Jr.
Preceded by Jovito Plameras Jr.	Representative, Lone District of Antique; 2001–2010	Succeeded by Paolo Everardo Javier
