= Evelio Javier Day =

Public holiday in the Philippines

- Official name: Governor Evelio B. Javier Day
- Observed by: Five provinces: all of Panay Island and Guimaras
- Significance: Marks the day in 1986 that Gov. Javier was assassinated, which led in part to the successful People Power Revolution later that month.
- Date: February 11
- Next time: 11 February 2026
- Frequency: annual
- First time: 1992
- Related to: EDSA Revolution Anniversary

Evelio Javier Day, officially Governor Evelio B. Javier Day, is a special non-working public holiday in the Philippines to "commemorate the death anniversary of the late Governor Evelio B. Javier" in the four provinces that comprise Panay Island, the Philippines, specifically Antique, Capiz, Aklan, and Iloilo. It has been a holiday on Panay Island every year since 1987.

Evelio Javier was a politician who was assassinated in the closing days of Ferdinand Marcos's presidency. A staunch supporter of then-presidential candidate Corazon Aquino, he was shot on February 11, 1986, four days after the Snap Elections of 1986 were held but while the counting was continuing. The assassination of Evelio Javier helped lead to Marcos's fall from power during the People Power Revolution, His assassination is seen as a tipping point in Marcos's fall.

Javier was killed in Freedom Park in San Jose, Antique allegedly under orders from former Assemblyman and Marcos ally Arturo Pacificador but Pacificador was acquitted of charges in 2004. Today Freedom Park is the center of Javier Day celebrations.

== See also ==
- Public holidays in the Philippines
