= Hermogenes Concepcion Jr. =

Filipino lawyer and politician (1920-2018)

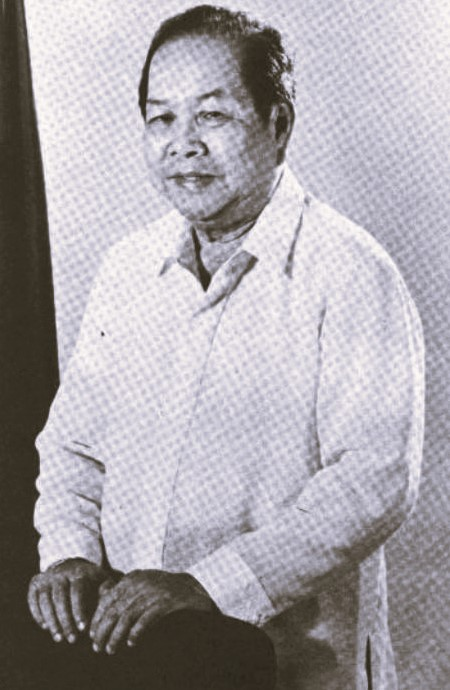
- Concepcion official portrait during the 8th Congress.

Member of the Philippine House of Representatives from Nueva Ecija's 3rd district
- In office June 30, 1987 – June 30, 1992
- Preceded by: District established
- Succeeded by: Pacifico Fajardo

Associate Justice of the Supreme Court of the Philippines
- In office April 18, 1975 – April 16, 1986
- Preceded by: Calixto Zaldivar
- Succeeded by: none (court reorganized)

Personal details
- Born: April 7, 1920
- Died: November 28, 2018 (aged 98)
- Party: Independent
- Education: University of the Philippines College of Law

Hermogenes Diaz Concepcion Jr. (April 7, 1920 – November 28, 2018) was a Filipino lawyer who served as Associate Justice of the Supreme Court of the Philippines from April 18, 1975 (55 years), to April 16, 1986 (66 years). He was appointed by President Ferdinand Marcos.

== Early life ==
Hermogenes Concepcion Jr. was born on April 7, 1920, in Cabanatuan City, Nueva Ecija. He received his secondary education from the Nueva Ecija High School in 1935, Bachelor of Law from the University of the Philippines College of Law in 1941 as youngest member of the class. He joined Upsilon Sigma Phi in 1938.

== Career ==
He was Assistant Fiscal of Manila from 1945 to 1958, then City Fiscal of Manila from 1958 to 1963. He was appointed as Associate Justice of the Court of Appeals of the Philippines in 1963, serving until his eventual appointment to the Supreme Court. As Justice of the Supreme Court, he penned many landmark decisions, including the famous Horacio Morales case.

Upon his retirement from the Supreme Court, he ran for Congress and represented his district in Nueva Ecija for one term.

He was a Board Member of the Philippine National Construction Corporation. He was also a Chairman of the Board of Trustees of Government Service Insurance System.

== Awards ==
He was awarded the Philippine Legion of Honor by President Ramon Magsaysay for his successful prosecution of the politburo of the Philippine Communist Party.

== Death ==
He died on November 28, 2018, at the age of 98.
