= Antique's at-large congressional district =

Congressional district in the Philippines

- Constituency for the House of Representatives of the Philippines
- Location of Antique within the Philippines
- Province: Antique
- Region: Western Visayas
- Population: 612,974 (2020)
- Electorate: 387,998 (2022)
- Area: 2,729.17 km^{2} (1,053.74 sq mi)

Current constituency
- Created: 1907 (single-member district)
- Representative: Antonio Legarda Jr.
- Political party: NPC
- Congressional bloc: Majority

Antique's at-large congressional district, also known as Antique's lone district, is the sole congressional district of the Philippines in the province of Antique. Antique has been represented in the country's various national legislatures since 1898. Since 1907, Antique has been entitled to one member in the House of Representatives of the Philippines, elected provincewide at-large, except for a brief period between 1943 and 1944 when a second seat was allocated in the National Assembly of the Second Philippine Republic. It was also earlier represented by three members in the First Philippine Republic legislature known as the Malolos Congress from 1898 to 1901.

The district is currently represented by Antonio Agapito "AA" Legarda Jr. of the Nationalist People's Coalition (NPC).

== Representation history ==
| # | Term of office | | National Assembly | Seat A | | | | Seat B | | | | Seat C | | | |
| # | Start | End | National Assembly | Image | Member | Party | Electoral history | Image | Member | Party | Electoral history | Image | Member | Party | Electoral history |
=== Antique's at-large district for the Malolos Congress ===
District created June 18, 1898.
| – | September 15, 1898 | March 23, 1901 | 1st | | Vicente López | Nonpartisan | Elected in 1898. | | Aristón Gella | Nonpartisan | Appointed. | | Eusebio Natividad | Nonpartisan | Appointed. |
| # | Term of office | | Legislature | Single seat | | | | Seats eliminated | | | | | | | |
| # | Start | End | Legislature | Image | Member | Party | Electoral history | Seats eliminated | | | | | | | |
| === Antique's at-large district for the Philippine Assembly === | | | | | | | | Seats eliminated | | | | | | | |
| District re-created January 9, 1907. | | | | | | | | Seats eliminated | | | | | | | |
| 1 | October 16, 1907 | October 16, 1909 | 1st | | Pedro V. Jiménez | Progresista | Elected in 1907. | Seats eliminated | | | | | | | |
| 2 | October 16, 1909 | October 16, 1916 | 2nd | | Ángel Salazar | Progresista | Elected in 1909. | Seats eliminated | | | | | | | |
| 2 | October 16, 1909 | October 16, 1916 | 3rd | | Ángel Salazar | Progresista | Re-elected in 1912. | Seats eliminated | | | | | | | |
| # | Term of office | | Legislature | Single seat | | | | Seats eliminated | | | | | | | |
| # | Start | End | Legislature | Image | Member | Party | Electoral history | Seats eliminated | | | | | | | |
| === Antique's at-large district for the House of Representatives of the Philippine Islands === | | | | | | | | Seats eliminated | | | | | | | |
| 3 | October 16, 1916 | June 6, 1922 | 4th | | Ramón Maza | Nacionalista | Elected in 1916. | Seats eliminated | | | | | | | |
| 3 | October 16, 1916 | June 6, 1922 | 5th | | Ramón Maza | Nacionalista | Re-elected in 1919. | Seats eliminated | | | | | | | |
| (2) | June 6, 1922 | June 2, 1925 | 6th | | Ángel Salazar | Nacionalista; Colectivista | Elected in 1922. | Seats eliminated | | | | | | | |
| 4 | June 2, 1925 | June 5, 1934 | 7th | | Segundo C. Moscoso | Nacionalista; Consolidado | Elected in 1925. | Seats eliminated | | | | | | | |
| 4 | June 2, 1925 | June 5, 1934 | 8th | | Segundo C. Moscoso | Nacionalista; Consolidado | Re-elected in 1928. | Seats eliminated | | | | | | | |
| 4 | June 2, 1925 | June 5, 1934 | 9th | | Segundo C. Moscoso | Nacionalista; Consolidado | Re-elected in 1931. | Seats eliminated | | | | | | | |
| 5 | June 5, 1934 | September 16, 1935 | 10th | | Calixto Zaldívar | Nacionalista; Demócrata Pro-Independencia | Elected in 1934. | Seats eliminated | | | | | | | |
| # | Term of office | | National Assembly | Single seat | | | | Seats eliminated | | | | | | | |
| # | Start | End | National Assembly | Image | Member | Party | Electoral history | Seats eliminated | | | | | | | |
| === Antique's at-large district for the National Assembly (Commonwealth of the Philippines) === | | | | | | | | Seats eliminated | | | | | | | |
| (5) | September 16, 1935 | December 30, 1941 | 1st | | Calixto Zaldívar | Nacionalista; Demócrata Pro-Independencia | Elected in 1935. | Seats eliminated | | | | | | | |
| (5) | September 16, 1935 | December 30, 1941 | 2nd | | Calixto Zaldívar | Nacionalista | Re-elected in 1938. | Seats eliminated | | | | | | | |
| # | Term of office | | National Assembly | Seat A | | | | Seat B | | | | Seats restored | | | |
| # | Start | End | National Assembly | Image | Member | Party | Electoral history | Image | Member | Party | Electoral history | Seats restored | | | |
| === Antique's at-large district for the National Assembly (Second Philippine Republic) === | | | | | | | | | | | | Seats restored | | | |
| District re-created September 7, 1943. | | | | | | | | | | | | Seats restored | | | |
| – | September 25, 1943 | February 2, 1944 | 1st | | Alberto A. Villavert | KALIBAPI | Elected in 1943. | | Tobias Fornier | KALIBAPI | Appointed as an ex officio member. | Seats restored | | | |
| # | Term of office | | Common wealth Congress | Single seat | | | | Seats eliminated | | | | | | | |
| # | Start | End | Common wealth Congress | Image | Member | Party | Electoral history | Seats eliminated | | | | | | | |
| === Antique's at-large district for the House of Representatives of the Commonwealth of the Philippines === | | | | | | | | Seats eliminated | | | | | | | |
| District re-created May 24, 1945. | | | | | | | | Seats eliminated | | | | | | | |
| 6 | June 9, 1945 | May 25, 1946 | 1st | | Emigdio V. Nietes | Popular Front | Elected in 1941. | Seats eliminated | | | | | | | |
| # | Term of office | | Congress | Single seat | | | | Seats eliminated | | | | | | | |
| # | Start | End | Congress | Image | Member | Party | Electoral history | Seats eliminated | | | | | | | |
| === Antique's at-large district for the House of Representatives of the Philippines === | | | | | | | | Seats eliminated | | | | | | | |
| (6) | May 25, 1946 | December 30, 1949 | 1st | | Emigdio V. Nietes | Popular Front | Re-elected in 1946. | Seats eliminated | | | | | | | |
| 7 | December 30, 1949 | October 31, 1964 | 2nd | | Tobias Fornier | Nacionalista | Elected in 1949. | Seats eliminated | | | | | | | |
| 7 | December 30, 1949 | October 31, 1964 | 3rd | | Tobias Fornier | Nacionalista | Re-elected in 1953. | Seats eliminated | | | | | | | |
| 7 | December 30, 1949 | October 31, 1964 | 4th | | Tobias Fornier | Nacionalista | Re-elected in 1957. | Seats eliminated | | | | | | | |
| 7 | December 30, 1949 | October 31, 1964 | 5th | | Tobias Fornier | Nacionalista | Re-elected in 1961. Died. | Seats eliminated | | | | | | | |
| 8 | December 30, 1965 | December 30, 1969 | 6th | | José A. Fornier | Nacionalista | Elected in 1965. | Seats eliminated | | | | | | | |
| 9 | December 30, 1969 | September 23, 1972 | 7th | | Enrique A. Zaldívar | Liberal | Elected in 1969. Removed from office after imposition of martial law. | Seats eliminated | | | | | | | |
| District dissolved into the sixteen-seat Region VI's at-large district for the Interim Batasang Pambansa. | | | | | | | | Seats eliminated | | | | | | | |
| # | Term of office | | Batasang Pambansa | Single seat | | | | Seats eliminated | | | | | | | |
| # | Start | End | Batasang Pambansa | Image | Member | Party | Electoral history | Seats eliminated | | | | | | | |
| === Antique's at-large district for the Regular Batasang Pambansa === | | | | | | | | Seats eliminated | | | | | | | |
| District re-created February 1, 1984. | | | | | | | | Seats eliminated | | | | | | | |
| – | July 23, 1984 | March 25, 1986 | 2nd | | Arturo F. Pacificador | KBL | Elected in 1984. Election retroactively annulled by the Supreme Court. | Seats eliminated | | | | | | | |
| – | – | – | 2nd | | Evelio Javier | UNIDO | Posthumously declared winner of 1984 elections September 22, 1986. | Seats eliminated | | | | | | | |
| # | Term of office | | Congress | Single seat | | | | Seats eliminated | | | | | | | |
| # | Start | End | Congress | Image | Member | Party | Electoral history | Seats eliminated | | | | | | | |
| === Antique's at-large district for the House of Representatives of the Philippines === | | | | | | | | Seats eliminated | | | | | | | |
| District re-created February 2, 1987. | | | | | | | | Seats eliminated | | | | | | | |
| 10 | June 30, 1987 | June 30, 1998 | 8th | | Exequiel Javier | Independent | Elected in 1987. | Seats eliminated | | | | | | | |
| 10 | June 30, 1987 | June 30, 1998 | 9th | | Exequiel Javier | Lakas | Re-elected in 1992. | Seats eliminated | | | | | | | |
| 10 | June 30, 1987 | June 30, 1998 | 10th | | Exequiel Javier | Lakas | Re-elected in 1995. | Seats eliminated | | | | | | | |
| 11 | June 30, 1998 | June 30, 2001 | 11th | | Jovito C. Plameras Jr. | Lakas | Elected in 1998. | Seats eliminated | | | | | | | |
| (10) | June 30, 2001 | June 30, 2010 | 12th | | Exequiel Javier | Lakas | Elected in 2001. | Seats eliminated | | | | | | | |
| (10) | June 30, 2001 | June 30, 2010 | 13th | | Exequiel Javier | Lakas | Re-elected in 2004. | Seats eliminated | | | | | | | |
| (10) | June 30, 2001 | June 30, 2010 | 14th | | Exequiel Javier | Lakas | Re-elected in 2007. | Seats eliminated | | | | | | | |
| 12 | June 30, 2010 | June 30, 2019 | 15th | | Paolo Everardo S. Javier | Liberal | Elected in 2010. | Seats eliminated | | | | | | | |
| 12 | June 30, 2010 | June 30, 2019 | 16th | | Paolo Everardo S. Javier | Liberal | Re-elected in 2013. | Seats eliminated | | | | | | | |
| 12 | June 30, 2010 | June 30, 2019 | 17th | | Paolo Everardo S. Javier | PDP–Laban | Re-elected in 2016. | Seats eliminated | | | | | | | |
| 13 | June 30, 2019 | June 30, 2022 | 18th | | Loren Legarda | NPC | Elected in 2019. | Seats eliminated | | | | | | | |
| 14 | June 30, 2022 | Incumbent | 19th | | Antonio Agapito Legarda Jr. | NPC | Elected in 2022. | Seats eliminated | | | | | | | |
| 14 | June 30, 2022 | Incumbent | 20th | | Antonio Agapito Legarda Jr. | NPC | Re-elected in 2025. | Seats eliminated | | | | | | | |

== Election results ==
=== 2025 ===
2025 Philippine House of Representatives elections
| Party | Candidate | Votes | % |
|---|---|---|---|
| NPC | Antonio Agapito Legarda Jr. | 209,083 | 63.23 |
| NUP | Rhodora Cadiao | 119,673 | 36.26 |
| Reporma | Toto Abiog | 994 | 0.30 |
| Independent | Remigio Petinglay | 687 | 0.21 |
| Invalid or blank votes | | | |
| Total votes | | 330,437 | 100.00 |

=== 2022 ===
2022 Philippine House of Representatives elections
| Party | Candidate | Votes | % |
|---|---|---|---|
| NPC | Antonio Agapito Legarda Jr. | 189,907 | 56.15 |
| PDP–Laban | Paolo Javier | 69,299 | 20.49 |
| Liberal | Abe Fajardo | 28,848 | 8.53 |
| PDP–Laban | Pao Javier | 10,755 | 1.18 |
| Invalid or blank votes | | 39,433 | 11.66 |
| Total votes | | 338,242 | 100.00 |

=== 2019 ===
2019 Philippine House of Representatives elections
| Party | Candidate | Votes | % |
|---|---|---|---|
| NPC | Loren Legarda | 199,187 | 66.43 |
| Independent | Exequiel Javier | 69,716 | 23.25 |
| Independent | Robin Robinos | 1,951 | 0.65 |
| Independent | Rodelo Pidoy | 1,662 | 0.55 |
| PGRP | Jun Villaflor | 701 | 0.23 |
| Invalid or blank votes | | 26,609 | 8.87 |
| Total votes | | 299,826 | 100.00 |

=== 2016 ===
2016 Philippine House of Representatives elections
| Party | Candidate | Votes | % |
|---|---|---|---|
| Liberal | Paolo Javier | 120,096 | 43.70 |
| UNA | Raymundo Roquero | 86,727 | 31.56 |
| NPC | Robert Delfin | 11,060 | 4.02 |
| Independent | Junior Combong | 3,791 | 1.38 |
| LM | Narzal Mallares | 3,748 | 1.36 |
| Independent | Rodelio Pidoy | 1,700 | 0.62 |
| KBL | Antero Villaflor | 1,093 | 0.40 |
| Invalid or blank votes | | 46,624 | 16.96 |
| Total votes | | 274,839 | 100.00 |

=== 2013 ===
2013 Philippine House of Representatives elections
| Party | Candidate | Votes | % |
|---|---|---|---|
| Liberal | Paolo Javier | 94,566 | 48.05 |
| UNA | Raymundo Roquero | 70,586 | 36.00 |
| LM | Antero Florante Villaflor | 2,014 | 1.02 |
| Margin of victory | | 23,980 | 12.18% |
| Invalid or blank votes | | 29,642 | 15.06 |
| Total votes | | 196,808 | 100.00 |
| Liberal hold | | | |

=== 2010 ===
2010 Philippine House of Representatives elections
| Party | Candidate | Votes | % |
|---|---|---|---|
| Lakas–Kampi | Paolo Javier | 93,081 | 44.97 |
| NPC | Salvacion Z. Perez | 66,282 | 32.03 |
| KBL | Arturo Pacificador | 30,471 | 14.72 |
| PDSP | Robert Delfin | 12,848 | 6.21 |
| Aksyon | Narzal Mallares | 3,443 | 1.66 |
| LM | Antero Florante Jr. | 838 | 0.40 |
| Valid ballots | | 206,953 | 88.72 |
| Invalid or blank votes | | 27,628 | 12.95 |
| Total votes | | 234,591 | 100.00 |
| Lakas–Kampi hold | | | |
