= Governor of Antique =

Local chief executive

- Gobernador ka Probinsya kang Hantike
- Incumbent; Paolo Javier since June 30, 2025
- Style: Governor; Honorable Governor; Pinalangga nga Gobernador
- Seat: New Antique Provincial Capitol, San Jose de Buenavista, Antique
- Appointer: Direct popular vote
- Term length: 3 years, not eligible for re-election immediately after three consecutive terms
- Constituting instrument: Philippine Commission Act No. 83; Republic Act No. 7160
- Inaugural holder: Francisco Domingo Escote
- Formation: 1751
- Website: Official Website of the province of Antique

The Governor of Antique (Kinaray-a: Gobernador kang Antique; Filipino: Punong Lalawigan ng Antique) is the chief executive of the provincial government of Antique, Philippines. Like all local government heads in the Philippines, the governor is elected via popular vote, and may not be elected for a fourth consecutive term (although the former governor may return to office after an interval of one term). In case of death, resignation or incapacity, the vice governor becomes the governor.

The current governor is Paolo Javier, who has been assuming the post since 2025.

== List of governors ==
=== Spanish governors of Antique province ===
Order	Year in office	Governor	Notes
1	1751–1755	Francisco Domingo Escote	
2	1756–1759	Antonio Arguelles	
3	1760–1761	Josef Arellano	
4	1762–1765	Mariano dela Torre y Bulacao	
5	1766–1768	Francisco (Margas) Vergara	
6	1769–1770	Manuel Tabuena	
7	1771–1776	Vicente Quejada	
8	1777–1778	Jose Arguelles	
9	1778–1780	Antonio Arguelles	
10	1781–1782	Tomas Aguirre	
11	1783–1785	Juan Salgado	
12	1786–1787	Juan Montinola	
13	1788–1792	Pedro Bargas y Hombrona	
14	1793–1798	Manuel Jotea	
15	1799–1802	Pedro Vidal	
16	1802–1803	Angel Paredes	
17	1803–1804	Fernando Ruiz	
18	1805-1805	Juan Ameja	
19	1808–1814	Angel Paredes	
20	1815–1817	Rafael Andres Gomez	
21	1818–1820	Juan Ormido	
22	1820–1821	Bernardo Simon y Mecenas	
23	1821–1823	Antonio Esteves	
24	1824 –	Juan Josef de Valda	
25	1825–	Francisco Oreta	
26	1826–1827	Francisco Matinez y Cañas	
27	1828–1829	Francisco Oreta	
28	1829 –	Domingo Benito	
29	1830–1833	Francisco Benitez y Cañas	
30	1834–1836	Domingo Benito	
31	1837–1844	Manuel de Yturriaga y Moco	
32	1845–1848	Ramon Plaza	
33	1849–1850	Joaquin Varon	
34	1851–1860	Enrique Barbaza	
35	1860–	Luis Santamaria	
36	1861–1863	Juan Martinez	
37	1864–1865	Jose Gutierez	
38	1865–1866	Jose Arcinas	
39	1866–1867	Jose Marzan	
40	1867–1868	Jose Bordoy	
41	1868–1869	Leandro Casamor	
42	1869–	Jose Ramos	
43	1870–	Eulogio Santos	
44	1871–1872	Julian Ordoñez	
45	1873–1875	Andres Coll Valz	
46	1876–1877	Felix Gomez y Codez	
47	1877–1878	Andres Coll Valz	
48	1878–	Felix Gomez y Codez	
49	1878–1879	Diego del Rio Rianzon	
50	1879–1881	Leandro Allendes Salazar	
51	1881–1884	Manuel Castillon	
52	1884–1886	Ladislao de Vera	
53	1887–1888	Antonio Montono	
54	1888–1890	Juan Bravo	
55	1891–1893	Gregoria Cuestra	
56	1893–1894	Ygnacio Cadrana	
57	1894–	Ysidro Castro	
58	1895–	Ygnacio Martinez	
59	1896–1897	Manuel Zuberia y Gallar	
60	1897–1898	Castro Verde	
61	1898–	Francisco Aparacio y Jurada	

=== Revolutionary government ===
Order	Year in office	Governor	Notes
62	1898–	Pedro Gella	Revolutionary governor
63	1898–	Leandro Locsin Fullon	Filipino government

=== American governors ===
Order	Year in office	Governor	Notes
64	1900–	Lt. Col. W. S. Scott	American military governor
65	1901–	Lt. Col. W. S. Scott	American civil governor
66	1901–	Major Holbrock	Acting civil governor

=== Filipino governors ===
Order	Official portrait	Year in office	Governor	Notes
67		1901–1904	Leandro Locsin Fullon	Was a revolutionary general who lead the expeditionary force sent by Emilio Aguinaldo to Panay Island and established a revolutionary government.
68		1904–1909	Angel Salazar, Sr.	
69		1909–1913	Santos Capadocia	
70		1912–1919	Anacleto Jimenez Villavert	
71		1919–1922	Vicente Gella	He is the maternal great-granduncle of Philippine Senator Loren Legarda
72		1922–1931	Enrique Salvani	
73		1931–1934	Mamerto Portillo	
74		1935–1938	Alejandro Lim	
75		1938–1940 1947–1951	Alberto A. Villavert	
76		1940–1947	Tobias Fornier	The municipality of Tobias Fornier was named after him
77		1951–1955	Calixto Zaldivar	Associate justice of the Supreme Court from 1964 to 1974. He was the father of former Antique Governor Salvacion Perez
78		1955–1963	Josue Lacson Cadiao	Father of former Antique Governor Rhodora Cadiao
79		1963–1967	Encarnacion Fornier	
80		1967–1971	Julian Pacificador	
81		1971–1980	Evelio Javier	Aged 28, Evelio Javier is the Philippines' youngest governor. The day of his assassination (February 11) is now marked as Governor Evelio B. Javier Day and is a special non-working public holiday in the provinces of Antique, Capiz, Aklan, and Iloilo, the four provinces on Panay island.
82		1980–1986	Enrique A. Zaldivar	
83		1986–1998	Jovito Plameras Jr.	
84		1998–2001	Exequiel Bellaflor Javier	
85		2001–2010	Salvacion Zaldivar Perez	
(84)		2010–2015	Exequiel Bellaflor Javier	
86		2015–2025	Rhodora Javier Cadiao	
87		2025–present	Paolo Javier	
