= Alberto A. Villavert =

Filipino politician (1903–1984)

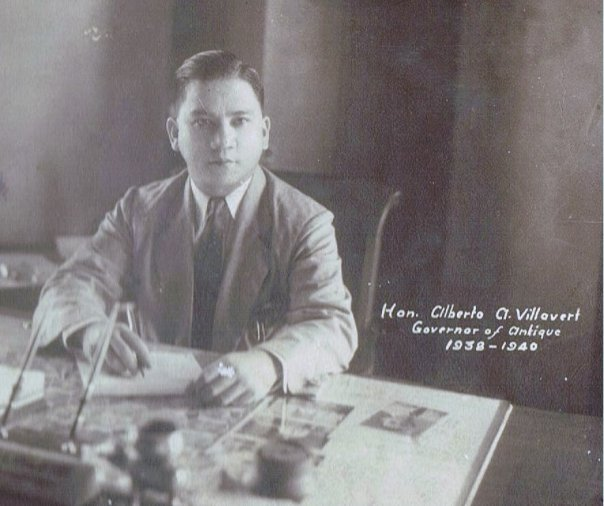
- Villavert as Governor of Antique

Mayor of San Jose de Buenavista
- In office 1928–1934

Governor of Antique
- In office December 30, 1937 – December 30, 1941
- In office May 28, 1946 – December 30, 1947
- In office January 1, 1948 – December 30, 1951

Member of the National Assembly (Second Philippine Republic) from Antique
- In office October 17, 1943 – February 2, 1944 Serving with Tobias Fornier

Technical Assistant to President Elpidio Quirino
- In office 1953–1953

Philippine Veterans Administrator
- In office 1962–1966

Personal details
- Born: Alberto Villavert y Arcega; April 25, 1903 Antique, Philippine Islands
- Died: March 1, 1984 (aged 80)
- Party: Liberal (1946–1984)
- Other political affiliations: KALIBAPI (1942–1945); Nacionalista (1928–1942; 1945–1946)
- Parent: Anacleto Jimenez Villavert
- Education: University of Manila

Alberto Arcega Villavert (25 April 1903 – 1 March 1984) was a Filipino politician who led the Province of Antique between 1937 and 1946 both as an appointed and elected Governor. He was first elected as presidente municipal (town mayor) of Antique's capital town of San Jose de Buenavista in 1928 and was the youngest presidente municipal in his time at the age of 24 and then became governor of the province in 1937. Villavert became an Antique Representative of the National Assembly from 1943 to 1944. During World War II, he served in the USAFFE and subsequently appointed as Governor of the Province again from 1946 to 1947 and then elected and served the same post from 1948 to 1951.

He was technical assistant to then President Elpidio Quirino in 1953. He retired from government service in 1966 after having served the Philippine Veterans Administration/Office for four years. He is a commerce graduate and law student of the University of Manila. His father Anacleto Jimenez Villavert also served as Governor of the province of Antique 1913–1919. His son Anacleto Hierro Villavert became a Provincial Board Member of Antique (South District). Named after him is a busy commercial street in the heart of San Jose.

== Images ==
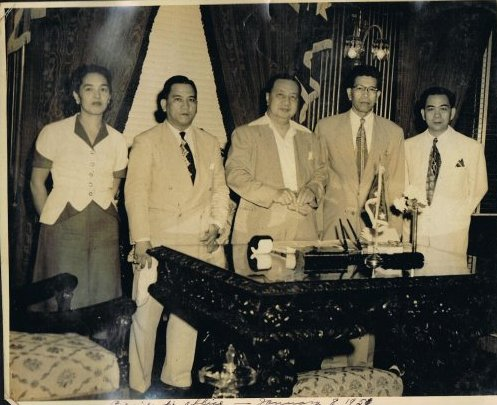
Governor Villavert with President Quirino

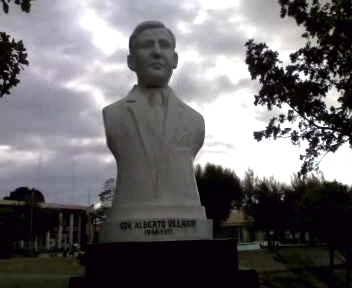
A statue of Governor Villavert in front of the provincial Capitol

== See also ==
- Legislative district of Antique
- San Jose, Antique
