= Antique Provincial Board =

Legislative body of the province of Antique, Philippines

Antique Provincial Board Sangguniang Panlalawigan ng Antique

Type
- Type: Unicameral
- Term limits: 3 terms (9 years)

Leadership
- Presiding Officer: Genevive L. Reyes, NUP since June 30, 2025

Structure
- Seats: 13 board members 1 ex officio presiding officer
- Political groups: NPC (4) NUP (4) Nacionalista (1) Independent (2) Nonpartisan (2)
- Length of term: 3 years
- Authority: Local Government Code of the Philippines

Elections
- Voting system: Plurality-at-large (regular members); Indirect election (ex officio members)
- Last election: May 13, 2019
- Next election: May 9, 2022

Meeting place
- Antique Provincial Capitol, San Jose de Buenavista

The Antique Provincial Board is the Sangguniang Panlalawigan (provincial legislature) of the Philippine province of Antique.

The members are elected via plurality-at-large voting. The province is divided into two districts, each sending five members to the provincial board; the electorate votes for five members, with the five candidates with the highest number of votes being elected. The vice governor is the ex officio presiding officer, and only votes to break ties. The vice governor is elected via the plurality voting system province-wide.

== District apportionment ==
Elections	No. of seats per district		Ex officio seats	Total seats
Elections	1st	2nd	Ex officio seats	Total seats
2004–present	5	5	3	13

== List of members ==
An additional three ex officio members are the presidents of the provincial chapters of the Association of Barangay Captains, the Councilors' League, the Sangguniang Kabataan provincial president; the municipal and city (if applicable) presidents of the Association of Barangay Captains, Councilor's League and Sangguniang Kabataan, shall elect amongst themselves their provincial presidents which shall be their representatives at the board.

=== Current members ===
These are the members after the 2025 local elections and 2023 barangay and SK elections:

- Vice Governor: Genevive L. Reyes (NUP)

Seat	Board member	Party	Start of term	End of term
1st district	Dante M. Beriong	Independent	June 30, 2022	June 30, 2028
1st district	Fernando D. Corvera	Nacionalista	June 30, 2025	June 30, 2028
1st district	Alfie Jay O. Niquia	NPC	June 30, 2019	June 30, 2028
1st district	Vincent H. Piccio III	Aksyon	June 30, 2025	June 30, 2028
1st district	Zoilo Bernardo E. Tubianosa	Aksyon	June 30, 2025	June 30, 2028
2nd district	Noel C. Alamis	Nacionalista	June 30, 2019	June 30, 2028
2nd district	Joseph Eugene D. Alojipan	NUP	June 30, 2025	June 30, 2028
2nd district	Karmila Rose A. Dimamay	Independent	June 30, 2019	June 30, 2028
2nd district	Emmanuel C. Palacios, Jr.	NUP	June 30, 2019	June 30, 2028
2nd district	Gaseva V. Recopuerto	NUP	June 30, 2025	June 30, 2028
PCL	Ricky M. Lavega	Independent		
ABC				
SK				

=== Vice Governor ===
Election year	Name	Party
2001	Roberto Operiano	
2004	Rhodora Cadiao	Lakas
2007	Rhodora Cadiao	Lakas
2010	Rosie Dimamay	Lakas–Kampi
2013	Rhodora Cadiao	UNA
2016	Edgar Denosta	NUP
2019	Edgar Denosta	NPC
2022	Edgar Denosta	NPC
2025	Genevive L. Reyes	NUP

=== 1st district ===
Election year	Member (party)	Member (party)	Member (party)	Member (party)	Member (party)
2004	Silvestre Untaran (Liberal)	Bernardo Tubianosa (Liberal)	Damian Marfil, Jr. (Lakas)	Vincent Piccio III (Lakas)	Julito Osunero (Liberal)
2007	Dante Beriong (Independent)	Fernando Corvera (NPC)	J. Tobias Javier (Lakas)	Vincent Piccio III (Lakas)	Alfonso Combong, Jr. (NPC)
2010	Dante Beriong (Independent)	Edgar Denosta (Lakas-Kampi)	J. Tobias Javier (Lakas-Kampi)	Dino Raul Operiano (Lakas-Kampi)	Ronald Plameras (Lakas-Kampi)
2013	Dante Beriong (Independent)	Edgar Denosta (Liberal)	J. Tobias Javier (Liberal)	Vincent H. Piccio III (UNA)	Arturo Pacificador (UNA)
2016	Rony L. Molina (Liberal)	Vincent H. Piccio III (NUP)	Fernando C. Corvera (NUP)	Santiago J. Lotilla IV (NUP)	Pio Sumande (Independent)
2019	Nene Maye Plameras (NPC)	Vincent H. Piccio III (NUP)	Pio Sumande (NPC)	Fernando Corvera (NPC)	Alfie Jay Niquia (NUP)
2022	Dante M. Beriong (Independent)	Nene Maye Plameras (Aksyon)	Pio Sumande (NPC)	Rony Molina (PDP–Laban)	Alfie Jay O. Niquia (NPC)
2025	Dante M. Beriong (Independent)	Fernando D. Corvera (Nacionalista)	Vincent H. Piccio III (Aksyon)	Zoilo Bernardo E. Tubianosa (Aksyon)	Alfie Jay O. Niquia (NPC)

=== 2nd District ===
Election year	Member (party)	Member (party)	Member (party)	Member (party)	Member (party)
2004	Rosie Dimamay (Lakas)	Burgos Nicopior (Liberal)	Errol Santillan (Lakas)	Calixto Zaldivar III (LDP)	Juanita dela Cruz (NPC)
2007	Rosie Dimamay (Lakas)	Hector Frangue (NPC)	Errol Santillan (Lakas)	Calixto Zaldivar III (NPC)	Benjamin Juanitas (Lakas-Kampi)
2010	Egidio Elio (Independent)	Plaridel Sanchez VI (NPC)	Victor Condez (Lakas-Kampi)	Calixto Zaldivar III (PMP)	Joseph Alojipan (Lakas-Kampi)
2013	Egidio Elio (Independent)	Errol Santillan (Liberal)	Victor Condez (Liberal)	Teopisto Estaris (Liberal)	Joseph Alojipan (UNA)
2016	Rosie A. Dimamay (Liberal)	Egidio P. Elio (NUP)	Joseph Eugene D. Alojipan (UNA)	Errol T. Santillan (NUP)	Juris L. Juanitez (Liberal)
2019	Noel Alamis (NPC)	Victor Condez (Independent)	Karmila Dimamay (Independent)	Errol T. Santillan (NUP)	Emmanuel C. Palacios Jr. (NUP)
2022	Noel Alamis (NPC)	Victor Condez (NPC)	Karmila Rose A. Dimamay (PDP–Laban)	Egidio P. Elio (PDP–Laban)	Emmanuel C. Palacios Jr. (Lakas)
2025	Noel C. Alamis (Nacionalista)	Karmila Rose A. Dimamay (Independent)	Joseph Eugene D. Alojipan (NUP)	Gaseva V. Recopuerto (NUP)	Emmanuel C. Palacios Jr. (NUP)
