= Rhodora Cadiao =

Philippine politician

The Honorable Rhodora Cadiao
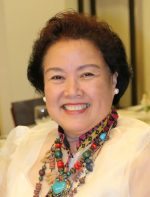

20th Governor of Antique
- In office June 30, 2016 – June 30, 2025
- Vice Governor: Edgar Denosta
- Preceded by: Exequiel Javier
- Succeeded by: Paolo Javier
- In office February 3, 2015 – March 28, 2016
- Vice Governor: Edgar Denosta
- Preceded by: Exequiel Javier
- Succeeded by: Exequiel Javier

Vice Governor of Antique
- In office March 28, 2016 – June 30, 2016
- Governor: Exequiel Javier
- Preceded by: Edgar Denosta
- Succeeded by: Edgar Denosta
- In office June 30, 2013 – February 2, 2015
- Governor: Exequiel Javier
- Preceded by: Rosie Dimamay
- Succeeded by: Edgar Denosta
- In office June 30, 2004 – June 30, 2010
- Governor: Salvacion Z. Perez
- Preceded by: Roberto Operanio
- Succeeded by: Rosie Dimamay

Personal details
- Born: February 2, 1955 (age 71) Culasi, Antique, Philippines
- Party: NUP (2015–present)
- Other political affiliations: UNA (2012–2015); Lakas (2004–2012)
- Occupation: Politician
- Nickname: "Dodod"

Rhodora Javier Cadiao is a Filipina politician. She was born to Josue Lacson Cadiao, a former Governor of Antique, and Lolita Solis Javier, a former Vice Governor. Her maternal grandmother Esperanza Solis-Javier (former mayor of Culasi, Antique) was the first ever female mayor in the province. Cadiao was the Governor of Antique province in the Western Visayas Region from 2015 to 2025. As a reelectionist candidate in the May 13, 2019 election under the National Unity Party, she defeated former governor Exequiel Javier from the Liberal Party. She was re-elected for a third term in 2022. In 2025, she ran for the House of Representatives representing Antique's lone district, but lost to the incumbent, Antonio Legarda Jr.

Political offices
Preceded by Exequiel Javier	Governor of Antique; 2015–2025	Succeeded by Paolo Javier
Preceded by Rosie Dimamay	Vice Governor of Antique; 2013–2015	Succeeded by Edgar Denosta
Preceded by Roberto Operanio	Vice Governor of Antique; 2004–2010	Succeeded by Rosie Dimamay
