= Salvacion Z. Perez =

Philippine politician (born 1937)

19th Governor of Antique
- In office June 30, 2001 – June 30, 2010
- Vice Governor: Roberto Operiano (2001–2004); Rhodora Cadiao (2004–2010)
- Preceded by: Exequiel Javier
- Succeeded by: Exequiel Javier

Personal details
- Born: Salvacion Ang Zaldivar; April 21, 1937 (age 89) Pandan, Antique, Commonwealth of the Philippines
- Party: NPC (2007–present)
- Other political affiliations: Liberal (2004–2007); LDP (2001–2004)
- Spouse: Jose Gaston Perez
- Parent(s): Calixto Zaldivar; Elena Torres Ang
- Education: Central Philippine University; University of the Philippines Diliman; Asian Institute of Management

Salvacion Ang Zaldivar-Perez (born April 21, 1937), popularly known as "Inday Sally", was the governor of the Philippine province of Antique from 2001 to 2010.

== Early life and education ==
Salvacion Perez was born to Calixto O. Zaldivar (1904-1979), former Supreme Court justice from 1964 to 1974, and his wife Elena Torres Ang.

== Career ==
Perez was governor for three terms from 2001 to 2010. In 2010, she ran for Congress, but was defeated by Paolo Everardo, the son of Exequiel Javier who became governor.
