= 2025 Iloilo City local elections =

Local elections in Philippines

- May 12, 2025
- Mayoral election
Candidate	Raisa Treñas	Roland Magahin
Party	NUP	Independent
Alliance	Team Uswag
Popular vote	170,162	75,139
Percentage	69.37	30.63
Mayor before election
Jerry Treñas
NUP
Mayor-elect
Raisa Treñas
NUP
- Vice mayoral election
Candidate	Juliet Grace Baronda	Jeffrey Ganzon
Party	Lakas	PFP
Alliance	Team Sulong Gugma	Team Uswag
Popular vote	132,562	121,453
Percentage	52.19	47.81
Vice mayor before election
Jeffrey Ganzon
PFP
Vica mayor-elect
Juliet Grace Baronda
Lakas
- City council election

12 of 14 seats to the Iloilo City Council 8 seats needed for a majority
Alliance	Team Uswag	Team Sulong Gugma
Seats won	11	1
Popular vote	1,372,631	792,964
Percentage	60.37	34.88

Local elections were held in Iloilo City on May 12, 2025, as part of the 2025 Philippine local elections. Voters elected candidates for all local positions above the barangay level, including the mayor of Iloilo City, vice mayor and members of the Iloilo City Council.

Raisa Treñas and Juliet Grace Baronda were elected mayor and vice mayor, respectively; along with Julienne Baronda, who was elected House representative for the city's lone district, this marks the first time where women occupied the top three posts in the city.

== Background ==
On the last day of voter registration, the city Commission on Elections reported a 500% increase in turnout, as compared to the previous days, with 1,351 applications against the usual 200. A total of around 36,000 new registrants filed to vote.

In March 2024, Iloilo City mayor Jerry Treñas announced that his daughter Raisa Treñas will run against the incumbent House representative Julienne Baronda. Baronda and the elder Treñas were political allies until Treñas announced his daughter's plans to challenge Baronda for the congressional seat. By September, Treñas's spokesperson said that Team Uswag slate is about to be completed, with Nene de la Llane replacing Jeck Conlu, who had resigned from the party. Furthermore, Sheen Mabilog was seen not to be included in the slate.

Mayor Treñas announced in October 2024 that he will not seek reelection, endorsing instead his daughter Raisa. Later that week, it was revealed that he underwent a bile duct operation in Manila. While he was recovering, Jeffrey Ganzon and Sedfrey Cabaluna served as acting mayor and vice mayor, respectively.

On the eve of filing of candidacies, Team Sulong Gugma of the Barondas had adopted independent candidates Jun Capulot and Mor Espinosa, and had three former councilors, including Sheen Mabilog, in their slate.

Team Uswag of the Treñases filed their candidacies on October 9, 2024. Raisa Treñas was indeed their mayoral candidate, while Ganzon sought reelection as vice mayor. Team Uswag's city council line-up included eight incumbents, and former councilors and other well-known figures in the city. Team Gugma, led by House representative Julienne Baronda, has her defending her congressional seat, while councilor Julie Grace, Julienne's sister, is running for vice mayor. Team Gugma held its proclamation rally at the University of San Agustin gymnasium. Candidates Treñas and Baronda issued a joint statement that announced their decision to set aside differences and unite for the sake of the city, and that they would not run against each other. Speaker Martin Romualdez reportedly brokered an agreement between the two camps.

Meanwhile, Team Gugma announced that former mayor Jed Patrick Mabilog is not running in this election. Another former mayor, Jose Espinosa III, endorsed Team Uswag's candidates, including his niece Raisa Treñas. Mabilog returned to the Philippines in 2024, after former president Rodrigo Duterte accused him of being linked to the illegal drugs trade, leading him to go to exile in the United States.

Independent candidate Roland Magahin, former boxer and businessman, is Treñas's opponent for mayor.

== Electoral system ==
Local elections in the Philippines are held in every second Monday of May, every three years starting in 1992. All cities of the Philippines have a mayor, vice mayor and Sangguniang Panlungsod (city council). Some cities, particularly those with a population of at least 250,000, also have a congressional district by themselves; Iloilo City has its own congressional district since 1987. Single-seat positions (mayor, vice mayor and House representative) are elected via direct popular vote on first-past-the-post-voting. Winners take office the June 30 after the election.

City council elections are done via plurality block voting, with the entire city electing the council at-large; each voter has 12 votes, and can vote for how many people as allowable. The 12 candidates with the highest number of votes being elected. The council also has two ex officio members, the city presidents of the Sangguniang Kabataan and of the Liga ng mga Barangay, which were elected indirectly following the 2023 Philippine barangay and Sangguniang Kabataan elections.

== Candidates ==
=== Team Uswag ===
Team Uswag fielded a full slate, including a 12-person council ticket.

- For mayor: Raisa Treñas
- For vice mayor: Jeffrey Ganzon
- For councilors:
  - Lyndon Acap
  - Sedfrey Cabaluna
  - Nene Dela Llana
  - Romel Duron
  - Rudolph Jeffrey Ganzon
  - Mandrie Malabor
  - Sheila Olid
  - Rex Sarabia
  - Frances Grace Parcon-Torres
  - Miguel Treñas
  - Johnny Young
  - Alan Zaldivar

=== Team Sulong Gugma ===
Team Sulong Gugma had a ten-person council ticket.

- For mayor: None
- For vice mayor: Julie Grace Baronda
- For councilors:
  - Evony Deveza
  - Kesha Pesina
  - R Leone Gerochi
  - Stanley Clyde Flores
  - Gene Manuel Ramos
  - Sheen Marie Mabilog
  - Peter Emil Oñate II
  - Mor Epinosa
  - Jun Capulot

=== PDP–Laban ===
- For councilors:
  - Efren Gimeo
  - Rich Piad

=== Independents ===
- For mayor:
  - Roland Magahin
- For councilors:
  - Abner Batan
  - Art Araneta
  - Muni Estrella

== Campaign ==
Team Uswag and Uswag Ilonggo party-list had their proclamation rally at the Iloilo Freedom Grandstand on March 28. Former Senate president Franklin Drilon endorsed the slate at the proclamation rally. Team Sulong Gugma launched their campaign after a mass at the Arevalo Church. Former mayor Jed Patrick Mabilog notably joined the proclamation rally. School classes were cancelled to give way to campaigning.

On the proclamation rally, Mayor Treñas said he had hard time taking over city hall in 2019, describing the city as one of the most methamphetamine (locally known as "shabu")-infested cities in the country. This was a reversal in 2024, when Treñas, while in the presence of Mabilog, who had paid him a courtesy call, said that the latter had no involvement with drugs."

On April 14, Mayor Treñas accused Team Gugma of endorsing Roland Magahin's independent campaign for mayor. Baronda denied this, despite tarpaulins that allegedly presented Magahin along with Team Gugma. Magahin himself denied that there was an alliance between him and Team Sulong Gugma, while adding that he personally supports Team Gugma's slate.

An opinion poll dated April 5 to 6 showed Baronda leading the vice mayoral race against Ganzon, with Baronda having the support of 53.3%, while Ganzon trailing at 46.5%, with a margin of error of ±4%.

== Results ==
For the first time in its history, Iloilo City elected women for mayor, vice mayor and House representative, with Raisa Treñas, Juliet Grace Baronda, and Julienne Baronda being proclaimed as mayor, vice mayor, and House representative. Treñas succeeds her father, vice mayor-elect Baronda takes over from defeated incumbent Jeffrey Ganzon, while House representative-elect Baronda defended her seat for her third and final term. Outgoing mayor Treñas remarked that "it only shows that here in Iloilo City, Ilonggos are inclusive and there is always a place for everyone."

In the city council race, Team Uswag won 11 of the 12 seats up.

According to the city Commission on Elections, all candidates complied with submitting their campaign expenses, with the mayor-elect spending 716,200 pesos, the vice-mayor-elect almost 265,000 pesos, and the House representative-elect spending over 472,000 pesos.

=== For mayor ===
Candidate	Party	Votes	%
Raisa Treñas	National Unity Party	170,162	69.37
Roland Magahin	Independent	75,139	30.63
Total		245,301	100.00
Valid votes		245,301	92.27
Invalid/blank votes		20,547	7.73
Total votes		265,848	100.00
Registered voters/turnout		330,621	80.41

=== For vice mayor ===
Candidate	Party	Votes	%
Juliet Grace Baronda	Lakas–CMD	132,562	52.19
Jeffrey Ganzon	Partido Federal ng Pilipinas	121,453	47.81
Total		254,015	100.00
Valid votes		254,015	95.87
Invalid/blank votes		10,931	4.13
Total votes		264,946	100.00
Registered voters/turnout		330,621	80.14

=== For councilor ===
Party or alliance		Votes	%	Seats
Team Uswag	Partido Federal ng Pilipinas	780,077	34.31	6
Team Uswag	National Unity Party	592,554	26.06	5
Team Uswag	Total	1,372,631	60.37	11
Team Sulong Gugma	Lakas–CMD	634,101	27.89	1
Team Sulong Gugma	Independent	158,593	6.98	0
Team Sulong Gugma	Total	792,964	34.88	1
Partido Federal ng Pilipinas		35,252	1.55	0
PDP–Laban		16,405	0.72	0
Independent		56,578	2.49	0
Ex officio seats				2
Total		2,273,560	100.00	14

==== Per candidate ====
Candidate	Party or alliance		Votes	%
Sedfrey Cabaluna	Team Uswag	National Unity Party	138,841	6.11
Miguel Treñas	Team Uswag	Partido Federal ng Pilipinas	134,616	5.92
Rex Marcus Sarabia	Team Uswag	National Unity Party	121,633	5.35
Alan Zaldivar	Team Uswag	Partido Federal ng Pilipinas	118,912	5.23
Lyndon Acap	Team Uswag	National Unity Party	115,912	5.10
Nene dela Llana	Team Uswag	Partido Federal ng Pilipinas	114,048	5.02
Mandrie Malabor	Team Uswag	National Unity Party	110,540	4.86
Johnny Young	Team Uswag	Partido Federal ng Pilipinas	107,413	4.72
Romel Duron	Team Uswag	Partido Federal ng Pilipinas	106,813	4.70
Rudolph Ganzon	Team Uswag	National Unity Party	105,628	4.65
Sheen Mabilog	Team Sulong Gugma	Lakas–CMD	104,469	4.59
Frances Grace Parcon	Team Uswag	Partido Federal ng Pilipinas	104,276	4.59
Shiella Olid	Team Uswag	Partido Federal ng Pilipinas	93,999	4.13
Bryant Zulueta	Team Sulong Gugma	Lakas–CMD	86,366	3.80
Boots Gerochi	Team Sulong Gugma	Lakas–CMD	83,303	3.66
Jun Capulot	Team Sulong Gugma	Independent	82,532	3.63
Kesha Pesina-Tupas	Team Sulong Gugma	Lakas–CMD	79,940	3.52
Von Deveza	Team Sulong Gugma	Lakas–CMD	77,887	3.43
Mor Espinosa	Team Sulong Gugma	Independent	76,061	3.35
Peter Oñate	Team Sulong Gugma	Lakas–CMD	70,003	3.08
Stanley Flores	Team Sulong Gugma	Lakas–CMD	68,025	2.99
Ariete Ramos	Team Sulong Gugma	Lakas–CMD	64,108	2.82
Art Araneta	Independent		30,476	1.34
Jan Barredo	Partido Federal ng Pilipinas		19,262	0.85
Junjun Moleta	Partido Federal ng Pilipinas		15,990	0.70
Abner Batan	Independent		15,870	0.70
Muni Estrella	Independent		10,232	0.45
Efren Gimeo	PDP–Laban		8,391	0.37
Rich Piad	PDP–Laban		8,014	0.35
Total			2,273,560	100.00

== Aftermath ==
All winning candidates under Team Uswag took their oaths of office on June 27.

One of Raisa Treñas's first official acts was appointing her ex-mayor father as a special adviser.

On the organization of the city council, Team Uswag netted all committee chairmanships; the sole opposition councilor, Sheen Mabilog, was shut out.
