= 2022 Philippine House of Representatives elections in Western Visayas =

- May 9, 2022
- All 19 Western Visayas seats in the House of Representatives
Party	Seats	+/–
NUP	5	+1
NPC	5	0
Nacionalista	4	−1
PDP–Laban	2	−1
Liberal	1	0
Lakas	1	0
Independent	1	+1
This lists parties that won seats. See the complete results below.

The 2022 Philippine House of Representatives elections in Western Visayas were held on May 9, 2022.

== Summary ==
Congressional district	Incumbent	Incumbent's party	Winner	Winner's party	Winning margin
Aklan–1st	Carlito Marquez	NPC	Carlito Marquez	NPC	18.97%
Aklan–2nd	Teodorico Haresco Jr.	Nacionalista	Teodorico Haresco Jr.	Nacionalista	80.19%
Antique	Loren Legarda	NPC	Antonio Legarda Jr.	NPC	40.36%
Bacolod	Greg Gasataya	NPC	Greg Gasataya	NPC	39.10%
Capiz–1st	Tawi Billones	Liberal	Tawi Billones	Liberal	26.80%
Capiz–2nd	Fredenil Castro	Lakas	Jane Castro	Lakas	19.68%
Guimaras	Lucille Nava	PDP–Laban	Lucille Nava	PDP–Laban	94.44%
Iloilo–1st	Janette Garin	NUP	Janette Garin	NUP	66.96%
Iloilo–2nd	Michael Gorriceta	Nacionalista	Michael Gorriceta	Nacionalista	Unopposed
Iloilo–3rd	Lorenz Defensor	NUP	Lorenz Defensor	NUP	96.56%
Iloilo–4th	Braeden John Biron	Nacionalista	Ferjenel Biron	Nacionalista	60.45%
Iloilo–5th	Raul Tupas	Nacionalista	Raul Tupas	Nacionalista	39.36%
Iloilo City	Julienne Baronda	NUP	Julienne Baronda	NUP	27.08%
Negros Occidental–1st	Gerardo Valmayor Jr.	NPC	Gerardo Valmayor Jr.	NPC	Unopposed
Negros Occidental–2nd	Leo Rafael Cueva	NUP	Alfredo Marañon III	NUP	Unopposed
Negros Occidental–3rd	Jose Francisco Benitez	PDP–Laban	Jose Francisco Benitez	PDP–Laban	84.66%
Negros Occidental–4th	Juliet Marie Ferrer	NUP	Juliet Marie Ferrer	NUP	Unopposed
Negros Occidental–5th	Maria Lourdes Arroyo	Lakas	Dino Yulo	Independent	19.47%
Negros Occidental–6th	Genaro Alvarez Jr.	NPC	Mercedes Lansang	NPC	Unopposed

== Aklan ==
=== 1st district ===
Incumbent Carlito Marquez of the Nationalist People's Coalition ran for a third term.

Marquez won re-election against former Batan mayor Rodell Ramos (National Unity Party), provincial board member Harry Sucgang (Aksyon Demokratiko) and Rodson Mayor (Independent).

Candidate	Party	Votes	%
Carlito Marquez (incumbent)	Nationalist People's Coalition	89,731	55.59
Rodell Ramos	National Unity Party	59,110	36.62
Harry Sucgang	Aksyon Demokratiko	9,710	6.02
Rodson Mayor	Independent	2,863	1.77
Total		161,414	100.00
Total votes		180,243	–
Registered voters/turnout		209,315	86.11
NPC hold			
Source: Commission on Elections

=== 2nd district ===
Incumbent Teodorico Haresco Jr. of the Nacionalista Party ran for a second term.

Haresco won re-election against two other candidates.

Candidate	Party	Votes	%
Teodorico Haresco Jr. (incumbent)	Nacionalista Party	134,436	87.43
Vide Mationg-Pamatian	Independent	11,130	7.24
Matt Wacan	Independent	8,206	5.34
Total		153,772	100.00
Total votes		173,029	–
Registered voters/turnout		200,623	86.25
Nacionalista hold			
Source: Commission on Elections

== Antique ==
Incumbent Loren Legarda of the Nationalist People's Coalition (NPC) ran for the Senate.

The NPC nominated Legarda's brother, Antonio Legarda Jr., who won the election against former representative Paolo Javier (PDP–Laban) and two other candidates.

Candidate	Party	Votes	%
Antonio Legarda Jr.	Nationalist People's Coalition	189,907	63.55
Paolo Javier	PDP–Laban	69,299	23.19
Ade Fajardo	Liberal Party	28,848	9.65
Pao Javier	PDP–Laban	10,755	3.60
Total		298,809	100.00
Total votes		338,242	–
Registered voters/turnout		387,998	87.18
NPC hold			
Source: Commission on Elections

== Bacolod ==
Incumbent Greg Gasataya of the Nationalist People's Coalition ran for a third term.

Gasataya won re-election against four other candidates.

Candidate	Party	Votes	%
Greg Gasataya (incumbent)	Nationalist People's Coalition	185,470	69.14
Dan Atayde	Independent	80,591	30.04
Nonong San Miguel	Pederalismo ng Dugong Dakilang Samahan	850	0.32
Romy Gustilo	Independent	738	0.28
Willy David	Independent	618	0.23
Total		268,267	100.00
Total votes		290,202	–
Registered voters/turnout		327,403	88.64
NPC hold			
Source: Commission on Elections

== Capiz ==
=== 1st district ===
Incumbent Tawi Billones of the Liberal Party ran for a third term.

Billones won re-election against former Capiz governor Dodoy Evan Contreras (PDP–Laban) and two other candidates.

Candidate	Party	Votes	%
Tawi Billones (incumbent)	Liberal Party	110,349	53.01
Dodoy Evan Contreras	PDP–Laban	54,558	26.21
Edgar Agana	People's Reform Party	42,726	20.53
Bros Diapo	Partido Pederal ng Maharlika	518	0.25
Total		208,151	100.00
Total votes		242,273	–
Registered voters/turnout		280,436	86.39
Liberal hold			
Source: Commission on Elections

=== 2nd district ===
Term-limited incumbent Fredenil Castro of Lakas–CMD ran for governor of Capiz. He was previously affiliated with the National Unity Party.

Lakas–CMD nominated his wife, former representative Jane Castro, who won the election against Mambusao mayor Jun Labao (PDP–Laban), provincial board member Bulilit Martinez (PROMDI) and two other candidates.

Candidate	Party	Votes	%
Jane Castro	Lakas–CMD	110,609	58.26
Jun Labao	PDP–Laban	73,243	38.58
Bulilit Martinez	PROMDI	3,861	2.03
Maria Vilma Besana	Partido Federal ng Pilipinas	1,141	0.60
Ronilo Esteves	Pederalismo ng Dugong Dakilang Samahan	985	0.52
Total		189,839	100.00
Total votes		214,201	–
Registered voters/turnout		248,643	86.15
Lakas hold			
Source: Commission on Elections

== Guimaras ==
Incumbent Lucille Nava of PDP–Laban ran for a third term.

Nava won re-election against Dado Veloso (Kilusang Bagong Lipunan).

Candidate	Party	Votes	%
Lucille Nava (incumbent)	PDP–Laban	93,994	97.22
Dado Veloso	Kilusang Bagong Lipunan	2,684	2.78
Total		96,678	100.00
Total votes		107,885	–
Registered voters/turnout		124,076	86.95
PDP–Laban hold			
Source: Commission on Elections

== Iloilo ==
=== 1st district ===
Incumbent Janette Garin of the National Unity Party ran for a second term. She was previously affiliated with the Nacionalista Party.

Garin won re-election against former Tubungan mayor Victor Tabaquirao (PDP–Laban).

Candidate	Party	Votes	%
Janette Garin (incumbent)	National Unity Party	148,558	83.48
Victor Tabaquirao	PDP–Laban	29,388	16.52
Total		177,946	100.00
Total votes		199,035	–
Registered voters/turnout		228,690	87.03
NUP hold			
Source: Commission on Elections

=== 2nd district ===
Incumbent Michael Gorriceta of the Nacionalista Party won re-election for a second term unopposed.

Candidate	Party	Votes	%
Michael Gorriceta (incumbent)	Nacionalista Party	155,133	100.00
Total		155,133	100.00
Total votes		195,525	–
Registered voters/turnout		222,230	87.98
Nacionalista hold			
Source: Commission on Elections

=== 3rd district ===
Incumbent Lorenz Defensor of the National Unity Party ran for a second term. He was previously affiliated with PDP–Laban.

Defensor won re-election against Eduardo Artazona (Independent).

Candidate	Party	Votes	%
Lorenz Defensor (incumbent)	National Unity Party	197,231	98.28
Eduardo Artazona	Independent	3,459	1.72
Total		200,690	100.00
Total votes		232,766	–
Registered voters/turnout		273,797	85.01
NUP hold			
Source: Commission on Elections

=== 4th district ===
Incumbent Braeden John Biron of the Nacionalista Party retired to run for mayor of Dumangas.

The Nacionalista Party nominated Biron's father, former representative Ferjenel Biron, who won the election against two other candidates.

Candidate	Party	Votes	%
Ferjenel Biron	Nacionalista Party	145,714	77.42
Antonio Parcon	Independent	31,942	16.97
Reynaldo Galeno	Partido Federal ng Pilipinas	10,563	5.61
Total		188,219	100.00
Total votes		227,756	–
Registered voters/turnout		261,174	87.20
Nacionalista hold			
Source: Commission on Elections

=== 5th district ===
Incumbent Raul Tupas of the Nacionalista Party ran for a third term.

Tupas won re-election against former representative Niel Tupas Jr. (Liberal Party).

Candidate	Party	Votes	%
Raul Tupas (incumbent)	Nacionalista Party	173,031	69.68
Niel Tupas Jr.	Liberal Party	75,304	30.32
Total		248,335	100.00
Total votes		267,219	–
Registered voters/turnout		312,391	85.54
Nacionalista hold			
Source: Commission on Elections

== Iloilo City ==
Incumbent Julienne Baronda of the National Unity Party ran for a second term.

Baronda won re-election against former Iloilo City mayor Jose Espinosa III (Nacionalista Party) and two other candidates.

Candidate	Party	Votes	%
Julienne Baronda (incumbent)	National Unity Party	147,834	62.88
Jose Espinosa III	Nacionalista Party	84,168	35.80
Juni Espinosa	Independent	1,666	0.71
Rudy Bantolo	Independent	1,445	0.61
Total		235,113	100.00
Total votes		259,575	–
Registered voters/turnout		330,470	78.55
NUP hold			
Source: Commission on Elections

== Negros Occidental ==
=== 1st district ===
Incumbent Gerardo Valmayor Jr. of the Nationalist People's Coalition won re-election for a second term unopposed.

Candidate	Party	Votes	%
Gerardo Valmayor Jr. (incumbent)	Nationalist People's Coalition	123,050	100.00
Total		123,050	100.00
Total votes		216,109	–
Registered voters/turnout		251,754	85.84
NPC hold			
Source: Commission on Elections

=== 2nd district ===
Term-limited incumbent Leo Rafael Cueva of the National Unity Party (NUP) ran for vice mayor of Sagay.

The NUP nominated Cueva's cousin, Sagay mayor Alfredo Marañon III, who won the election unopposed.

Candidate	Party	Votes	%
Alfredo Marañon III	National Unity Party	113,988	100.00
Total		113,988	100.00
Total votes		170,653	–
Registered voters/turnout		214,284	79.64
NUP hold			
Source: Commission on Elections

=== 3rd district ===
Incumbent Jose Francisco Benitez of PDP–Laban ran for a second term.

Benitez won re-election against Toto Bernard Ferraris (Reform Party).

Candidate	Party	Votes	%
Jose Francisco Benitez (incumbent)	PDP–Laban	204,301	92.33
Toto Bernard Ferraris	Reform Party	16,967	7.67
Total		221,268	100.00
Total votes		269,810	–
Registered voters/turnout		313,671	86.02
PDP–Laban hold			
Source: Commission on Elections

=== 4th district ===
Incumbent Juliet Marie Ferrer of the National Unity Party won re-election for a third term unopposed.

Candidate	Party	Votes	%
Yoyette Ferrer (incumbent)	National Unity Party	140,367	100.00
Total		140,367	100.00
Total votes		205,966	–
Registered voters/turnout		241,130	85.42
NUP hold			
Source: Commission on Elections

=== 5th district ===
Incumbent Maria Lourdes Arroyo of Lakas–CMD ran for a second term.

Arroyo was defeated by Dino Yulo, an independent. Macoy Javelosa (Independent) also ran for representative.

Candidate	Party	Votes	%
Dino Yulo	Independent	118,558	54.39
Maria Lourdes Arroyo (incumbent)	Lakas–CMD	76,115	34.92
Macoy Javelosa	Independent	23,288	10.68
Total		217,961	100.00
Total votes		246,545	–
Registered voters/turnout		291,349	84.62
Independent gain from Lakas			
Source: Commission on Elections

=== 6th district ===
Incumbent Genaro Alvarez Jr. of the Nationalist People's Coalition (NPC) was term-limited.

The NPC nominated Alvarez' daughter, former representative Mercedes Alvarez, who won the election unopposed.

Candidate	Party	Votes	%
Mercedes Alvarez	Nationalist People's Coalition	165,848	100.00
Total		165,848	100.00
Total votes		245,222	–
Registered voters/turnout		307,048	79.86
NPC hold			
Source: Commission on Elections
