= Tupas =

Tupas may refer to:

== People ==
- Binky April Tupas (born 1979), Filipino politician
- Lex Tupas, Filipino public servant
- Niel Tupas Sr. (1932–2015), governor of Iloilo
- Niel Tupas Jr. (born 1970), representative from Iloilo, son of Niel Tupas Sr.
- Raul Tupas (born 1971), representative and vice governor from Iloilo, son of Niel Tupas Sr.
- Rajah Tupas (1497–1568), Filipino monarch

== Other uses ==
- TUPAS, digital authentication method

== See also ==
- Tupa
