= 2016 Philippine House of Representatives elections in Western Visayas =

Elections were held in Western Visayas for seats in the House of Representatives of the Philippines on May 9, 2016.

== Summary ==
Party	Popular vote	%	Swing	Seats won	Change
Liberal	904,091			7	▼1
NPC	287,102			2	▲2
NUP	226,827			2	▲1
UNA	215,911			0	▼1
Nacionalista	124,686			0	
Independent	69,565			0	▼1
LM	3,748			0	
KBL	1,093			0	
Valid votes	1,833,023			11	
Invalid votes	353,696				
Turnout	2,186,719				
Registered voters					

== Aklan ==
Teodorico Haresco Jr. is the incumbent. He is running against former governor Carlito Marquez.

2016 Philippine House of Representatives election in Aklan's Lone district
Party	Candidate	Votes	%
NPC	Carlito Marquez	137,144	52.37
Nacionalista	Nonong Haresco	124,686	47.62
Invalid or blank votes		35,289	
Total votes		297,119	
NPC gain from Nacionalista			

== Antique ==
Paolo Everardo Javier is the incumbent.

2016 Philippine House of Representatives election in Antique's Lone district
Party	Candidate	Votes	%
Liberal	Paolo Javier	120,096	
UNA	Raymundo Roquero	86,727	
NPC	Robert Delfin	11,060	
Independent	Junior Combong	3,791	
LM	Narzal Mallares	3,748	
Independent	Rodelio Pidoy	1,700	
KBL	Antero Villaflor	1,093	
Invalid or blank votes		46,624	
Total votes		274,839	

== Capiz ==
Each of Capiz's two legislative districts will elect each representative to the House of Representatives. The candidate with the highest number of votes wins the seat.

=== 1st District ===
Antonio Del Rosario is the incumbent but ineligible for reelection. Instead, he ran for governor.

2016 Philippine House of Representatives election in Capiz' 1st District
Party	Candidate	Votes	%
Liberal	Emmanuel Billones Sr.	103,872	
UNA	Medardo Pestaño	28,639	
Invalid or blank votes		68,110	
Total votes		200,621	

=== 2nd District ===
Fredenil Castro is the incumbent and running unopposed.

2016 Philippine House of Representatives election in Capiz' 2nd District
Party	Candidate	Votes	%
NUP	Fredenil Castro	118,433	
Invalid or blank votes		63,800	
Total votes		182,233	
NUP hold			

== Guimaras ==
Joaquin Carlos Rahman A. Nava is the incumbent. His party nominated his wife Ma. Lucille Nava for the seat governor Carlito Marquez.

2016 Philippine House of Representatives election in Guimaras' Lone district
Party	Candidate	Votes	%
Liberal	Ma. Lucille Nava	50,922	
UNA	Henry Babiera	31,738	
NPC	Vicente de Asis	3,005	
Invalid or blank votes		6,824	
Total votes		92,489	

== Iloilo ==
Each of Iloilo's five legislative districts will elect each representative to the House of Representatives. The candidate with the highest number of votes wins the seat.

=== 1st District ===
Oscar "Richard" Garin, Jr. is the incumbent.

2016 Philippine House of Representatives election in Iloilo's 1st District
Party	Candidate	Votes	%
Liberal	Oscar Garin Jr.	133,811	
NPC	Gerardo Flores	18,283	
Invalid or blank votes		19,267	
Total votes		171,361	

=== 2nd District ===
Arcadio Gorriceta is the incumbent.

2016 Philippine House of Representatives election in Iloilo's 2nd District
Party	Candidate	Votes	%
Liberal	Arcadio Gorriceta	99,957	
UNA	June Mondejar	41,585	
Invalid or blank votes		14,032	
Total votes		155,574	

=== 3rd District ===
Arthur Defensor Jr. is the incumbent and running unopposed.

2016 Philippine House of Representatives election in Iloilo's 3rd District
Party	Candidate	Votes	%
Liberal	Arthur Defensor Jr.	148,941	
Invalid or blank votes		38,616	
Total votes		187,557	
Liberal hold			

=== 4th District ===
Hernan G. Biron Jr. is the incumbent but he is not seeking for reelection. His party nominated former congressman Ferjenel Biron.

2016 Philippine House of Representatives election in Iloilo's 4th District
Party	Candidate	Votes	%
NUP	Ferjenel Biron	108,394	
Independent	Rita Monfort-Bautista	63,465	
Independent	Felicito Dolar Jr.	609	
Invalid or blank votes		16,182	
Total votes		188,650	

=== 5th District ===
Neil Tupas, Jr. is the incumbent but ineligible for reelection. He is running for vice-governor instead. His party nominated his wife Yvonne Angeli Tupas, who is also running against his brother, incumbent vice governor Raul Tupas.

2016 Philippine House of Representatives election in Iloilo's 5th District
Party	Candidate	Votes	%
NPC	Raul Tupas	117,610	
Liberal	Yvonne Angeli Tupas	79,833	
Invalid or blank votes		20,054	
Total votes		217,497	

== Iloilo City ==
Jerry Treñas is the incumbent.

2016 Philippine House of Representatives election in Iloilo City's Lone District
Party	Candidate	Votes	%
Liberal	Jerry Treñas	166,659	
UNA	Daniel Cartagena	27,222	
Invalid or blank votes		24,898	
Total votes		218,779	
