= Tupa =

Tupa, Tupá, or Tupã can refer to:

- Tupa, the Finnish word for a cottage
- Tupã (mythology), a god in Tupi-Guarani religion and mythology
- Tupã, São Paulo, city in São Paulo state, Brazil
- Tupã Futebol Clube, Tupã, São Paulo, Brazil
- Tupã, proper name of star HD 108147 in the constellation of Crux
- Tupá, a village and municipality in Levice District, Slovakia
- Tom Tupa, NFL football player
- Ron Tupa, member of the Colorado Senate
- Lobelia tupa, a species of flower
- TUPA, ICAO designation for Auguste George Airport, British Virgin Islands
- Tupa, a fictional city in The Empire of Great Kesh, in the Riftwar fictional universe

== See also ==
- Tupas
