= List of vice governors of Iloilo =

Vice Governor of Iloilo
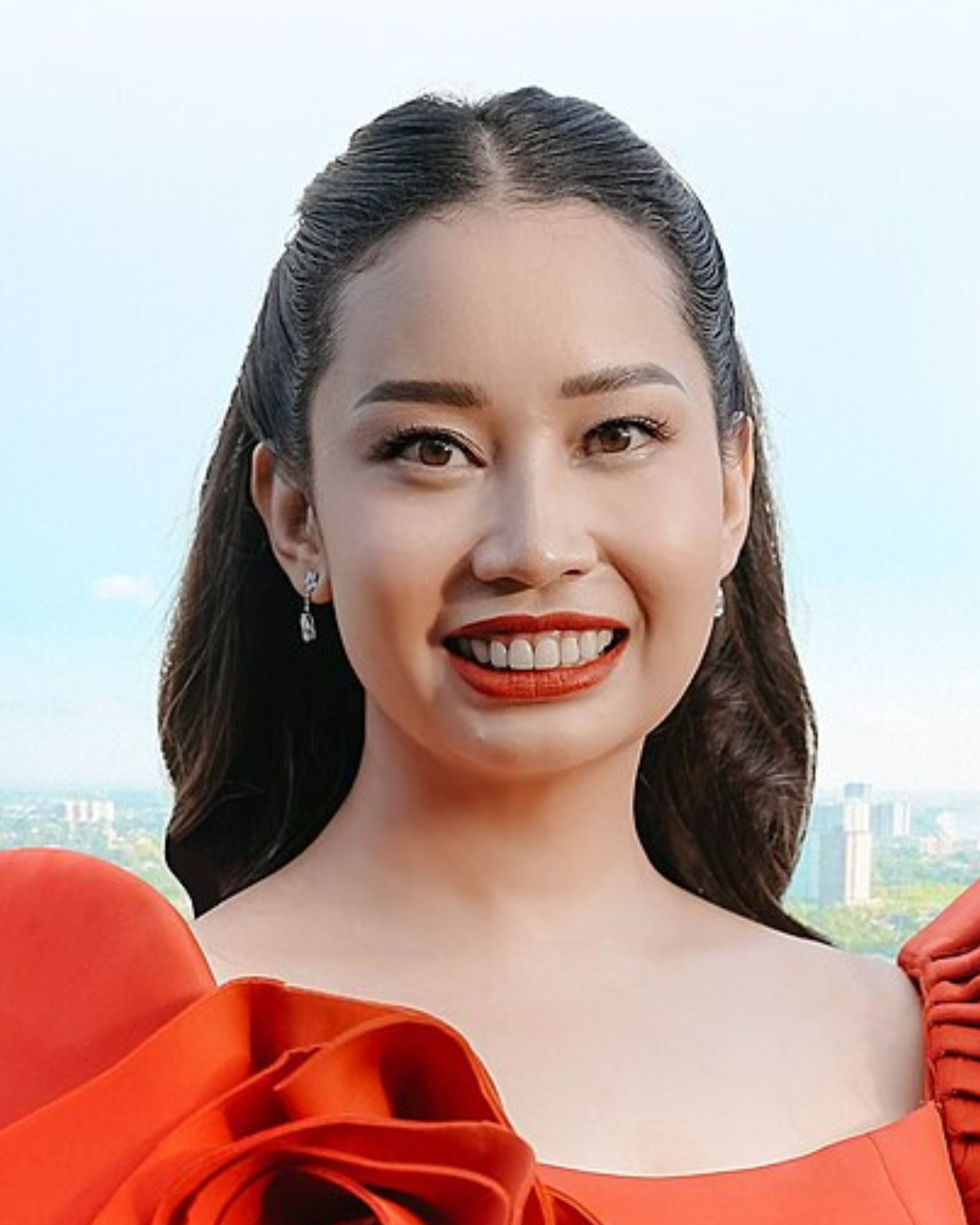
- Incumbent; Nathalie Ann F. Debuque since June 30, 2025
- Seat: Iloilo Provincial Capitol
- Term length: 3 years Up to three terms

The Vice Governor of Iloilo (Filipino: Pangalawang Punong Lalawigan ng Iloilo) is the presiding officer of the Sangguniang Panlalawigan, the legislature of the provincial government of Iloilo, Philippines.

The current vice governor is Nathalie Ann Debuque, in office since 2025.

== List of Vice Governors ==
No.	Image	Vice Governor	Term
1		Guardalino Mosqueda	1960-1963
2		Conrado Norada	1964-1969
3		Fortunato Padilla	1969-1971
4		Ramon Duremdes	1972-1986
5		Carlos Lopez Jr.	1986
6		Simplicio Griño	1986-1987
7		Ramon Lopez Jr.	1987-1988
(4)		Ramon Duremdes	1988-1990
8		Robert Maroma	1990-1992
(4)		Ramon Duremdes	1992
(8)		Robert Maroma	1992-1995
9		Demetrio Sonza	1995-2001
10		Roberto Armada	2001-2007
11		Rolex Suplico	2007-2010
12		Richard Garin	2010-2013
13		Raul Tupas	2013-2016
14		Christine Garin	2016-2025
15		Nathalie Ann Debuque	2025-present

== See also ==
- Governor of Iloilo
