= Niel Tupas Sr. =

Filipino politician (1932–2015)

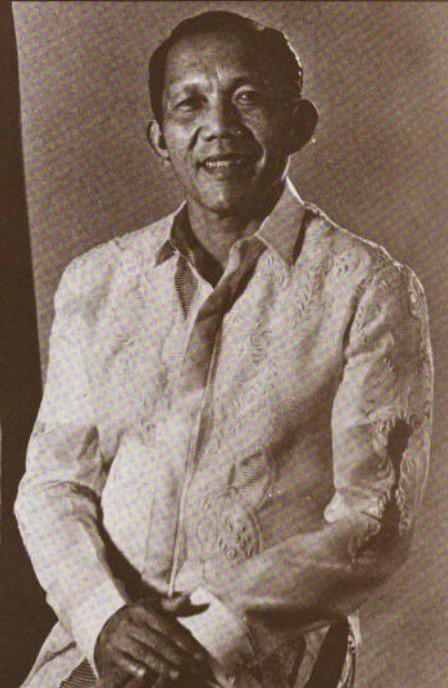

30th Governor of Iloilo
- In office June 30, 2001 – June 30, 2010
- Vice Governor: Roberto Armada (2001–2007); Rolex T. Suplico (2007–2010)
- Preceded by: Arthur Defensor Sr.
- Succeeded by: Arthur Defensor Sr.

Member of the House of Representatives from Iloilo's 5th district
- In office June 30, 1987 – June 30, 1998
- Preceded by: Jose Aldeguer
- Succeeded by: Rolex T. Suplico

Member of the Interim Batasang Pambansa from Region VI
- In office June 12, 1978 – June 5, 1984

Municipal Mayor of Barotac Viejo, Iloilo
- In office January 1, 1972 – June 11, 1978

Personal details
- Born: Niel Demaulo Tupas; November 27, 1932 Bay-ang, Ajuy, Iloilo, Philippine Islands
- Died: November 24, 2015 (aged 82) Quezon City, Philippines
- Party: Liberal (1988–1995, 2003–2015)
- Other political affiliations: LDP (1995–2003); PDP–Laban (1987–1988); KBL (1978–1987)
- Spouse: Myrna Causing Tupas
- Children: 7, including Niel Jr., Nielex and Raul
- Parent(s): Felix Tupas; Beatriz Demaulo
- Education: University of San Agustin (LL.B)
- Occupation: Politician

Niel Demaulo Tupas Sr. (November 27, 1932 – November 24, 2015) was the Governor of the province of Iloilo, a representative of the 5th District of the same province to the Batasang Pambansa (1978–1984) and Philippine Congress (1987–1998), and mayor of Barotac Viejo, Iloilo.

Tupas was a Bachelor of Law graduate and the first President of the Municipal Mayors' League of Iloilo in 1973 and Municipal Mayors' League of the Philippines. He was also the President of Western Visaya's Municipal Mayors' League in 1977. Tupas is the father of former Iloilo representative Niel Tupas Jr.

== Education ==
Tupas obtained his Bachelor of Laws from the University of San Agustin in 1957 and passed the Bar in the same year.

== Political career ==
After unsuccessful attempts for Congress, he won the post of municipal mayor of Barotac Viejo, Iloilo in 1972, where he served for seven years. In 1978, he was elected as assemblyman in the Batasang Pambansa. In 1987, he was elected as congressman, serving a total of 11 years as legislator under the new democratic government.

In 2001, Niel Tupas was elected governor of Iloilo. He led Iloilo Province to several national awards, especially in the anti-illegal gambling against jueteng campaign, stopping illegal fishing, and the clean and green program. He was re-elected in 2004 and once more during the May 12, 2007 elections, where he is now on his third term. He also sits as member of the Council of Advisers of the League of provinces of the Philippines.

Gov. Tupas and Mrs. Tupas have seven children, many of whom hold political office: they are the parents of Congressman Niel Tupas Jr., the mayor of Barotac Viejo, Iloilo, Niel Tupas III and Lex Tupas. Mrs Tupas herself served three times as municipal mayor of Municipality of Barotac Viejo.

Gov. Tupas was charged for graft and corruption before the Ombudsman for granting a quarry permit to an unqualified contractor who was said to have partnered with a mining company owned by the in-laws of his son Raul. The Ombudsman ordered Tupas dismissed in 2007 The police conducted a raid to enforce the dismissal on the Iloilo provincial capitol on January 17, 2007, but was halted by a temporary restraining order. His reelection in the same year made the penalty unenforceable.

In September 2015, two months before his death, Tupas Sr., together with three local government officials, was charged of graft by the Sandiganbayan on the case of anomalous payments to Green Core Geothermal, Inc. This involved 4 million Philippine pesos' worth of unconsumed electricity by the Iloilo provincial government from 2009 to 2010, under his term as the province governor. Tupas later posted bail for the case, and the anti-graft court withdrew the arrest warrant.

== Positions held ==
- 1972-1978 - Mayor, Barotac Viejo, Iloilo
- 1973 - First President, Municipal's League of Iloilo
- 1977 - President, Western Visayas Municipal's League and First President, Mayor's League of the Philippines
- 1978-1984 - Assemblyman, Batasang Pambansa for Region VI
- 1987-1998 - Representative, 5th District Province of Iloilo
- 2001-2010 - Governor of Iloilo

== Death ==
Tupas Sr. died due to multiple organ failure brought about by prostate cancer while he confined at the Philippine Heart Center in Quezon City on the early morning of November 24, 2015 at the age of 82, just 3 days before his 83rd Birthday.

Political offices
Preceded by Arthur Defensor Sr.	Governor of Iloilo; 2001–2010	Succeeded by Arthur Defensor Sr.
House of Representatives of the Philippines
Preceded by Jose Aldeguer	Member of the House of Representatives from Iloilo's 5th district 2010–2019	Succeeded by Rolex Suplico
