= Raul Tupas =

Filipino politician and former military officer (born 1971)

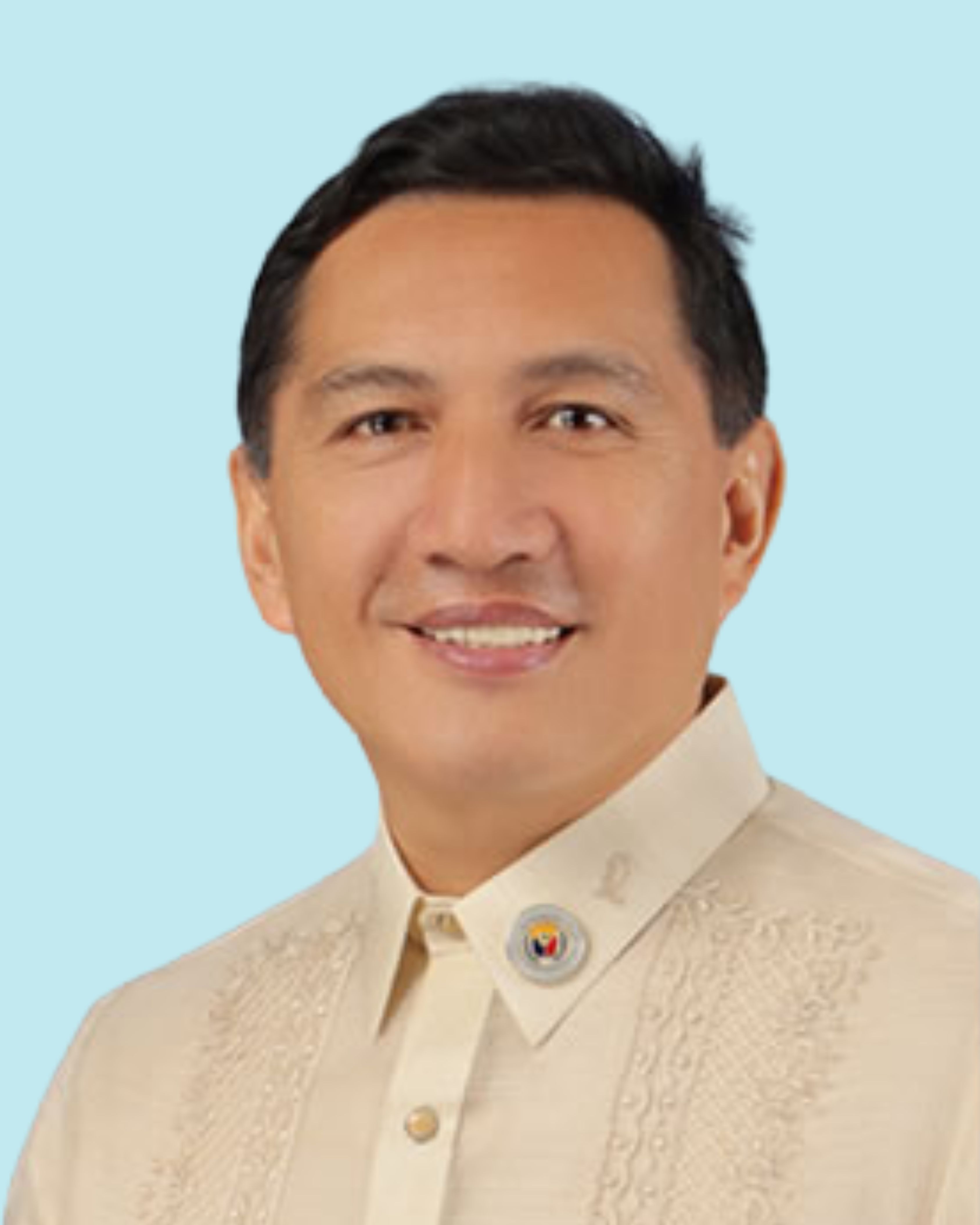
- Official portrait, 2022

Member of the House of Representatives from Iloilo’s 5th district
- In office June 30, 2016 – June 30, 2025
- Preceded by: Niel Tupas Jr.
- Succeeded by: Binky Tupas

Vice Governor of Iloilo
- In office June 30, 2013 – June 30, 2016
- Governor: Arthur Defensor Sr.
- Preceded by: Richard Garin
- Succeeded by: Christine Garin

Mayor of Barotac Viejo
- In office June 30, 2001 – June 30, 2010
- Vice Mayor: Ulysses Valdez (2001–2004); Juan Franco (2004–2007); Jovino Tugbang Jr. (2007–2010)
- Succeeded by: Niel Tupas III

Personal details
- Born: Raul Causing Tupas; June 10, 1971 (age 55) Iloilo City, Philippines
- Party: Lakas (2024–present)
- Other political affiliations: Nacionalista (2016–2024); NPC (2015–2016); Liberal (2007–2015); UGYON (2004–2015); LDP (2001–2004)
- Spouse: Binky Tupas
- Parent(s): Niel Tupas Sr. (father); Myrna Causing (mother)
- Relatives: Niel Tupas Jr. (brother); Lex Tupas (brother)
- Education: Philippine Military Academy (BS)
- Occupation: Politician

Raul "Boboy" Causing Tupas (born June 10, 1971) is a Filipino politician and former military officer. He served as representative of the 5th District of Iloilo in the House of Representatives of the Philippines from 2016 to 2025. He served as vice governor of Iloilo from 2013 to 2016.

== Early life and education ==
Tupas was born on June 10, 1971, in Iloilo City, to then-Mayor Niel Tupas Sr. and Myrna Causing. He studied La Salle Greenhills for his secondary education. He studied Philippine Military Academy and graduated in 1994 as part of Bantay Laya class.

== Military career ==
Before entering politics, he was served as captain for the Special Forces Regiment, an elite unit of the Philippine Army.

== Political career ==
Tupas started career in politics when he was a mayor of Barotac Viejo from 2001 to 2010 where he served for three consecutive terms.

In 2010, Tupas run for Governor of Iloilo to replace his father term-limited Governor Niel Tupas Sr. but defeated by Arthur Defensor Sr.

Tupas was served as director and technical assistant of the Department of Agriculture from 2010 to 2013.

In 2013, Tupas became a vice governor of Iloilo until 2016.

In 2016, Tupas was elected as representative for fifth district of Iloilo for three consecutive terms after he succeeded his brother.

In 2025, Tupas ran again as vice governor of Iloilo but he lost to Nathalie Ann Debuque.

== Personal life ==
Tupas is married to Binky April Tupas, a current representative for fifth district of Iloilo (2025–present) and has four children.

His brother Niel Tupas Jr., is also served as representative for fifth district of Iloilo from 2007 to 2016.

His father Niel Tupas Sr., was a representative and governor from Iloilo.
