= Jojo Ang =

Filipino businessman and politician (born 1976)

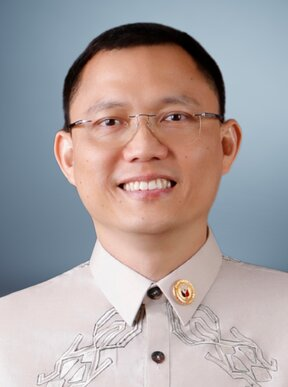
- Official portrait, 2025

Member of the House of Representatives for Uswag Ilonggo
- Incumbent
- Assumed office June 30, 2022

Personal details
- Born: James Angdit Ang, Jr. December 29, 1976 (age 49)
- Party: Uswag Ilonggo (2021–present) (party-list)
- Spouse: Jean Ann Jon Ang

James "Jojo" Angdit Ang Jr. (born December 29, 1976) is a Filipino businessman and politician currently serving as the representative for the Uswag Ilonggo party-list in the House of Representatives of the Philippines since 2022.

== Political career ==
Before entering public service, Ang worked as a salesman for International Builders Corporation (IBC), a contracting company based in Pavia, Iloilo, which is owned by his relatives. In 2022, he ran as the first nominee for the party-list Uswag Ilonggo, which won a single seat in the 19th Congress. In the 2025 elections, the party-list won another single seat, with Ang continuing as its representative.

On 21 September 2026, the Sandiganbayan ordered Ang suspended for 90 days as congressman after he was charged with graft over alleged conflict of interest in infrastructure projects.

== Personal life ==
Ang is married to Jean Ann Jon Ang.

== Electoral history ==
Electoral history of Jojo Ang
Year	Office	Party	Votes received				Result
Year	Office	Party	Total	%	P.	Swing	Result
2022	Representative (Party-list)	Uswag Ilonggo	689,607	1.87%	8th	—N/a	Won
2025	Representative (Party-list)	Uswag Ilonggo	777,754	1.85%	6th	—N/a	Won
