= Rodolfo Ganzon =

Filipino politician

The Honorable Rodolfo T. Ganzon
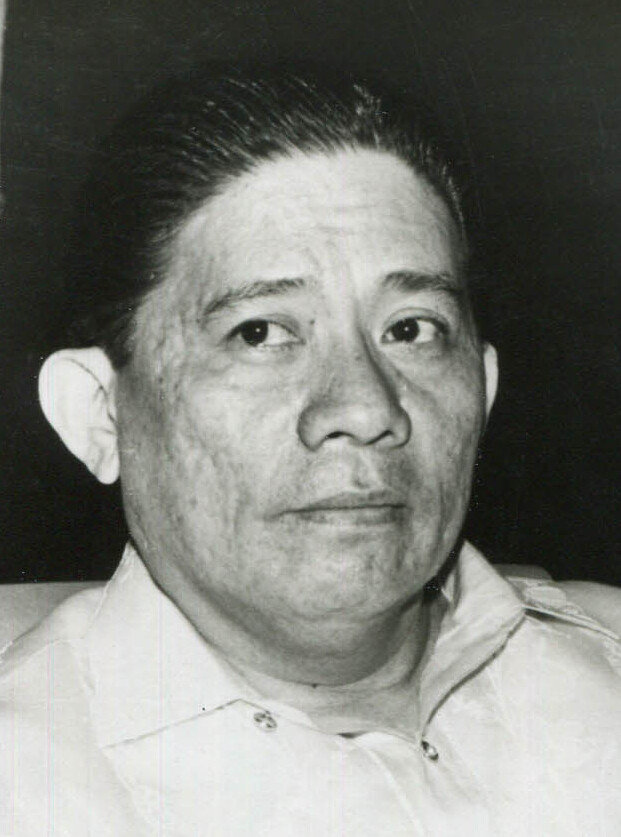

Senator of the Philippines
- In office December 30, 1963 – December 30, 1969

Senate Majority Leader
- In office January 26, 1967 – December 30, 1969
- Preceded by: Jose Roy
- Succeeded by: Arturo Tolentino

Member of the Philippine House of Representatives from Iloilo's 2nd District
- In office December 30, 1953 – November 10, 1955
- Preceded by: Pascual Espinosa
- Succeeded by: Pascual Espinosa
- In office December 30, 1961 – November 12, 1964
- Preceded by: Pascual Espinosa
- Succeeded by: Fermin Caram Jr.

8th Mayor of Iloilo City
- In office 1955–1961
- Preceded by: Dominador Jover
- Succeeded by: Reinario Ticao
- In office 1972 – October 1972
- Preceded by: Reinario Ticao
- Succeeded by: Francisco Garganera
- In office 1988–1992
- Preceded by: Antonio Hechanova
- Succeeded by: Mansueto Malabor

Personal details
- Born: March 25, 1922 Molo, Iloilo, Philippine Islands
- Died: October 29, 2003 (aged 81) Iloilo City, Philippines
- Party: Nacionalista
- Spouse(s): Dolores Padojinog (died); Rona Anape
- Children: 10
- Education: Central Philippine University and Iloilo City Colleges (now University of Iloilo)

Rodolfo Tiamson Ganzon Sr. (25 March 1922 - 29 October 2003) was a Filipino politician and lawyer from Iloilo who became Senator of the Philippines and was known as the Grand Timawa (Freeman).

== Early life and education ==
He was born on 25 March 1922 in Molo (now a district of Iloilo City) to Leopoldo Ganzon, who later became Mayor of Iloilo City, and Marcela Tiamson. He graduated summa cum laude from the College of Law of the Iloilo City Colleges in 1950 and placed third in the bar examinations the same year with an average of 91.10%.

He is also an alumnus of the Protestant founded Central Philippine University.

== Political career ==
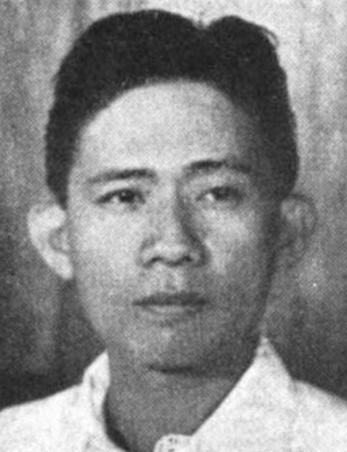
Ganzon official portrait during the 3rd Congress.

In 1951, Ganzon entered politics as an elected member of the Iloilo City Council. He then ran for and won a seat in Congress as the Representative of Iloilo's 2nd District. He served from 1953 to 1955 when he resigned his post after becoming the first elected mayor of Iloilo City. During his campaign, he presented himself as a populist who railed against the influence of the wealthy Lopez family. In one rally, he criticized the Lopezes for building their own private cemetery and touted the new municipal cemetery whose construction he had enabled, saying there he would be together with his constituents in death.

In 1961, he left the mayorship to successfully reclaim his post as Congressman of the 2nd District, serving until 1963 when he was elected to the Philippine Senate as a Nacionalista candidate, staying in office until 1969. As a senator, Ganzon headed the committees on government reorganization, health and labor and immigration, civil service, and agriculture and natural resources.

In 1971, he was again elected Mayor of Iloilo City but was removed from office in October of that year following the declaration of martial law by President Ferdinand Marcos, whom he feuded with as senator. He subsequently became one of the longest serving political detainees during the dictatorship, being placed under military custody in 1978 and then moved to house arrest until the fall of the regime in 1986. After his release, he found a local political party, the Timawa Party, and was elected again as mayor of Iloilo City from 1988 until 1992.

Among the legislation passed by Ganzon in Congress was Republic Act 1209 or the Iloilo City Freedom Law, which transferred the power of the President of the Philippines to appoint officials in the city to the electorate.

== Personal life and death ==
Ganzon was married twice, first to Dolores Padojinog with whom he had 10 children, among them Iloilo City Vice Mayor Jeffrey Ganzon, and after her death, to his secretary, Rona Anape.

Ganzon died from a lingering illness at the Saint Paul's Hospital in Iloilo City on 29 October 2003.
