= Raisa Treñas =

Filipino politician (born 1985)

The Honorable Raisa Treñas
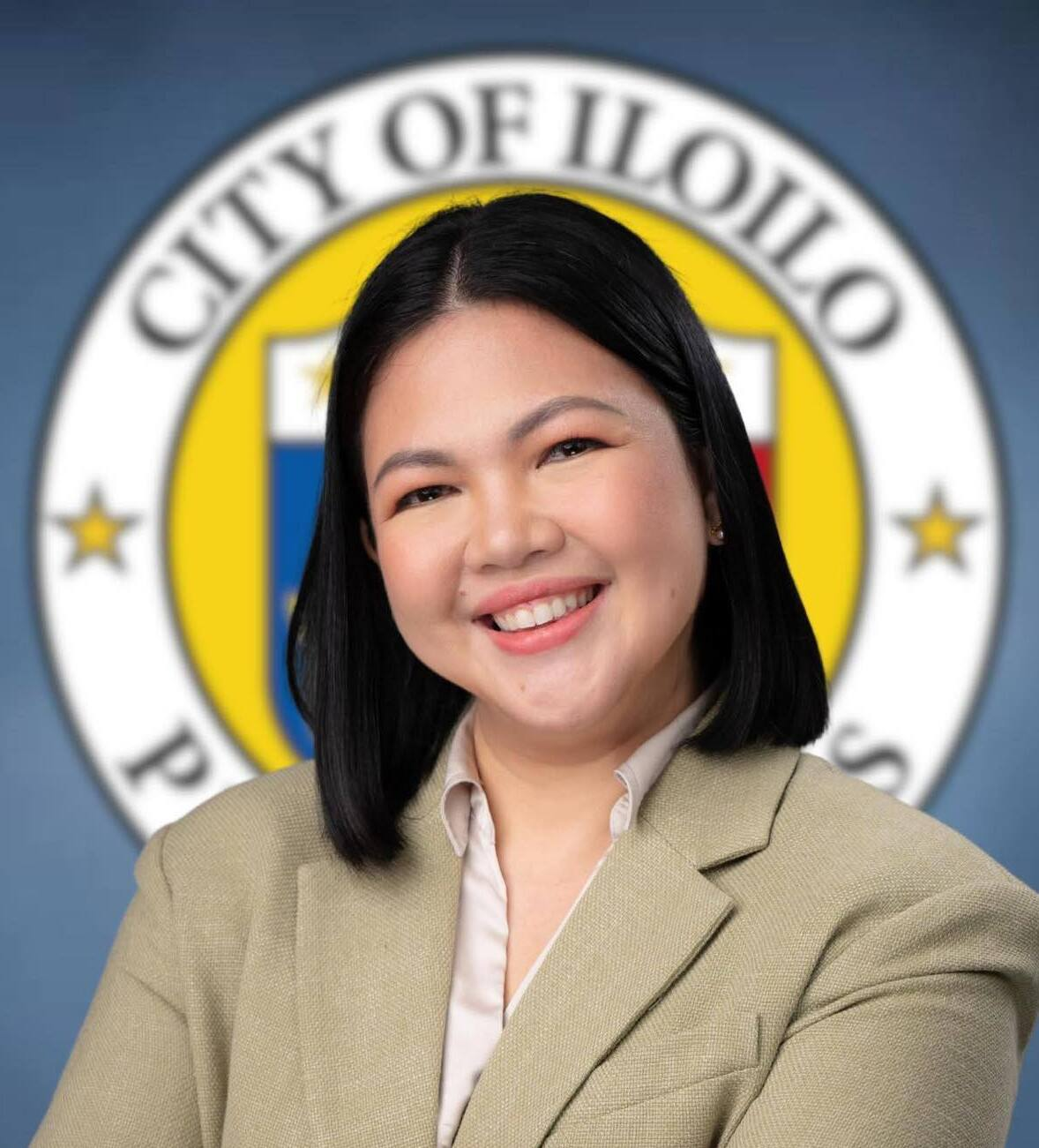
- Official portrait, 2025

19th Mayor of Iloilo City
- Incumbent
- Assumed office June 30, 2025
- Vice Mayor: Lady Julie Grace Baronda (since 2025)
- Preceded by: Jerry Treñas

Personal details
- Born: Raisa Maria Lourdes Sarabia Treñas; November 27, 1985 (age 40) Iloilo City, Philippines
- Party: NUP (2024–present)
- Other political affiliations: Uswag Ilonggo (partylist; 2021–2024)
- Spouse: Francis Y. Chu
- Children: 1
- Parent: Jerry Treñas
- Education: Assumption College (BA) (BCom); Ateneo de Manila University (MBA)
- Occupation: Politician and businesswoman
- Website: Mayor of Iloilo City website
- Nickname: Inday Raisa

Raisa Maria Lourdes Sarabia Treñas-Chu (born November 27, 1985), also known as Inday Raisa, is a Filipino businesswoman and politician who has been serving as the mayor of Iloilo City since 2025. Treñas-Chu is the first woman elected to the position and the second woman to serve as mayor of the city, following the appointment of Rosa O. Caram in 1986.

She is the daughter of former Iloilo City Mayor Jerry Treñas, under whom she previously served as an executive assistant. Treñas-Chu succeeded her father in the mayoralty.

== Early life and education ==
Treñas-Chu was born on November 27, 1985, in Iloilo City. She is the eldest of five siblings, born to Jerry Treñas, a long-serving politician who held positions as both congressman and mayor of Iloilo City, and Rosalie Sarabia, a businesswoman. She earned a Bachelor of Science in Commerce, major in Business and Political Economics, from Assumption College in Makati. She later pursued graduate studies and obtained a Master of Business Administration (MBA) from the Ateneo Graduate School of Business.

== Political career ==
At a young age, Treñas-Chu joined and became the secretary of Zonta Club Iloilo II, an all-female organization that advocates for women's rights.

In 2019, her father Jerry Treñas, during his second mayoral term, appointed Treñas-Chu as his executive assistant. In the 2022 Philippine general election, she served as the second nominee of the Uswag Ilonggo party-list.

In 2024, Jerry Treñas announced that he would not seek reelection in the 2025 Iloilo City local elections, citing health reasons. He publicly endorsed his daughter to succeed him. Treñas-Chu formally joined the National Unity Party (NUP), aligning with her father's political affiliation. Treñas-Chu ran for mayor with incumbent Vice Mayor Jeffrey Ganzon as her running mate. She won the election by a wide margin against her closest rival, Roland Magahin, becoming the first woman elected as mayor of Iloilo City, and the second woman to serve in the position following the appointment of Rosa O. Caram in the 1980s.

One of her first acts in office was appointing her father as a special adviser on June 30, 2025.

== Personal life ==
Treñas-Chu is married to Francis Y. Chu, a businessman based in Iloilo City.

Political offices
Preceded by Jerry Treñas	Mayor of Iloilo City; 2025–present	Incumbent
