= Jed Patrick Mabilog =

Filipino politician

Undersecretary for Public Safety of the Department of the Interior and Local Government
- Incumbent
- Assumed office May 13, 2026
- President: Bongbong Marcos
- Secretary: Jonvic Remulla

17th Mayor of Iloilo City
- In office June 30, 2010 – October 30, 2017
- Vice Mayor: Jose Espinosa III
- Preceded by: Jerry Treñas
- Succeeded by: Jose Espinosa III

Vice Mayor of Iloilo City
- In office June 30, 2007 – June 30, 2010
- Mayor: Jerry Treñas
- Preceded by: Victor Facultad
- Succeeded by: Jose Espinosa III

Member of the Iloilo City Council from the lone district
- In office June 30, 2004 – June 30, 2007

Personal details
- Born: Jed Patrick Escalante Mabilog; September 20, 1965 (age 60) Molo, Iloilo City, Philippines
- Party: Lakas (2004–2009; 2025–present)
- Other political affiliations: Independent (2017–2025); PDP-Laban (2016–2017); Liberal (2009–2016)
- Spouse: Marivic Griengo-Mabilog
- Children: 2
- Parent(s): Jose Chavez Mabilog; Melchorita Locsin Escalante
- Education: University of the Philippines High School in Iloilo
- Alma mater: West Visayas State University (BS); Ateneo de Manila University (MPM); University of the Philippines Visayas (MUP); University of Visayas (DMgt)
- Occupation: Politician

Jed Patrick Escalante Mabilog (born September 20, 1965) is a Filipino politician serving as an Undersecretary of the Department of the Interior and Local Government (DILG) since May 2026. He served as the Mayor of Iloilo City from 2010 to 2017. Mabilog also previously served as vice mayor from 2007 to 2010 and as a member of the city council from 2004 to 2007.

In August 2017, Mabilog left the office of mayor and went into self-imposed exile due to threats to his life arising from accusations of being a drug protector during the Duterte administration. In September 2024, he returned to the Philippines and worked to clear his name. He was granted executive clemency by President Bongbong Marcos in January 2025.

== Early life and education ==
Mabilog was born on September 20, 1965, and is the fifth of ten children of Jose Chavez Mabilog, a banker, and Melchorita Conlu Locsin Escalante, a former barangay captain of Barangay Tap-oc in Molo, Iloilo City. He attended Assumption Iloilo for elementary school and the University of the Philippines High School Iloilo (UPHSI) for high school. In 1986, he graduated from West Visayas State University (WVSU) with a Bachelor of Science degree, majoring in Biological Sciences. He subsequently enrolled in the same university to study medicine but left after three years. He later attended Ateneo de Manila University, where he earned a Master of Public Administration degree, and pursued a Master in Urban and Regional Planning at the University of the Philippines Visayas, as well as a Doctor of Management degree at the University of the Visayas.

== Political career ==
Mabilog's public service began during his college years when he was elected chairman of the Kabataang Barangay. His political career started in 2004 when he ran for and won a seat as an Iloilo City Councilor. He ran for Vice Mayor of Iloilo City in 2007 and was elected to the position. In 2010, he ran for the mayoralty of Iloilo City and won against former Justice Secretary Raul Gonzalez. He served three terms until 2017.

=== Allegations and political exile in the United States (2017–2024) ===
On August 7, 2016, Mabilog was accused and threatened by then-Philippine President Rodrigo Duterte of being a drug protector. Duterte even questioned Mabilog's residence in Molo, Iloilo City, describing it as “more grandiose” than Malacañang, which raised questions about his wealth. The allegation was categorically denied by Mabilog. He fled to the United States on August 30, 2017, after attending a disaster management program in Japan and an urban environment accords forum in Malaysia.

He did not return, leaving the office of mayor of Iloilo City vacant. The Ombudsman ordered the dismissal of Mabilog, and Vice Mayor Jose Espinosa III was appointed as the new mayor to serve the remainder of Mabilog's third term until 2019.

Mabilog and his family subsequently filed for political asylum in the United States and said that he would only return to the Philippines until Duterte left the presidency.

In 2021, the Court of Appeals (CA) dismissed an administrative complaint filed against Mabilog in connection with his alleged unexplained wealth, which had been the basis for his removal from office in 2017.

=== Return to the Philippines ===
On September 10, 2024, Mabilog returned to the Philippines and surrendered himself to the National Bureau of Investigation to face graft charges. He was released on September 11 after posting bail.

Mabilog appeared in an inquiry by the House of Representatives Quad-Committee that he exiled himself due to threats to his life during the Duterte administration and that there was a plan to implicate him, 2016 presidential candidate and former Interior and Local Government Secretary Mar Roxas, and Mabilog's cousin, former Senator Franklin Drilon, as drug lords.

Philippine Drug Enforcement Agency (PDEA) Director General Moro Virgilio Lazo also confirmed that Mabilog was never included in the PDEA's narcotics drug list under the Duterte administration, despite his name appearing on the list produced by Duterte, alongside other political figures allegedly involved in illegal drugs.

On September 20, 2024, Mabilog returned to Iloilo City after seven years of hiding. In January 2025, he was granted executive clemency by President Bongbong Marcos.

On May 1, 2025, Mabilog was appointed Special Adviser to House Speaker Martin Romualdez.

On May 13, 2026, Mabilog was appointed by President Bongbong Marcos as Undersecretary for Public Safety at the Department of the Interior and Local Government (DILG).

== Personal life ==
Mabilog is married to Marivic Griengo-Mabilog, who is the vice president for finance and comptroller of a geodetic engineering firm in Alberta, Canada. They have two children and maintain their residence in Molo. Mabilog is also a second cousin of former Senator Franklin Drilon.

== Accolades ==
In 2014, Mabilog was named as "top 5 best and outstanding mayor in the world" in the 2014 World Mayor awards. He was the only local chief executive from the Philippines to make it to the shortlist of 26 finalists from a total of 121 nominations around the world.

Political offices
Preceded by Victor Facultad	Vice Mayor of Iloilo City; 2007–2010	Succeeded by Jose Espinosa III
Preceded by Jerry Treñas	Mayor of Iloilo City; 2010–2017	Succeeded by Jose Espinosa III
