= Uswag Ilonggo =

Political party from the Philippines

- — Philippine partylist —
- Founder: Jerry Treñas
- Founded: 2020; 6 years ago
- Headquarters: Iloilo City
- Ideology: Ilonggo regionalism

Current representation (20th Congress)
- Seats in the House of Representatives: 1 / 3 (Out of 63 Partylist seats)
- Representative(s): James "Jojo" Ang Jr.

Uswag Ilonggo (stylized as USWAG Ilonggo) is a regional political party based in the province of Iloilo. It is also actively participating in the party-list elections in the Philippines. It represents the Western Visayas region and the Ilonggo people.

== Background ==
Uswag Ilonggo Party-List was established in 2020. Its constituents in the House of Representatives represent the Ilonggo people from the provinces of Iloilo, Guimaras, Capiz, Aklan, Antique, Negros Occidental, as well as some parts of Mindanao.

Uswag Ilonggo seeks to enhance the well-being of all Ilonggos, focusing on economic development, health, and education within the region.

== History ==
=== 19th Congress ===
Uswag Ilonggo participated in the 2022 elections, winning a single seat in the 19th Congress. The seat was filled by James "Jojo" Ang Jr., a native of Pavia, Iloilo, who served as the first nominee. Raisa Treñas, the daughter of then-Iloilo City Mayor Jerry Treñas, was named as the second nominee.

Up until March 2023, Ang was a co-owner of Allencon Development Corporation, a family-owned construction company that saw a rapid increase in contracts from the government from 2022 to 2023. In November 2025, the Independent Commission for Infrastructure, which is investigating the flood control projects scandal in the Philippines, recommended the filing of corruption charges against Ang before the Office of the Ombdusman.

== Electoral results ==
Election	Votes	%	Secured Seats	Party-List Seats	Congress	1st Representative	2nd Representative	3rd Representative
2022	689,607	1.87%	1 / 3	63	19th Congress; 2022–2025	James "Jojo" Ang Jr.	—N/a	—N/a
2025	777,754	1.85%	1 / 3	63	20th Congress; 2025–2028 (upcoming)	James "Jojo" Ang Jr.	—N/a	—N/a
Note: For party-list representation in the House of Representatives of the Philippines, a party can win a maximum of three seats.
