= Jose Espinosa III =

Filipino politician (born 1956)

The Honorable Jose Espinosa III

18th Mayor of Iloilo City
- In office October 30, 2017 – June 30, 2019
- Vice Mayor: Jeffrey Ganzon
- Preceded by: Jed Patrick Mabilog
- Succeeded by: Jerry Treñas

Vice Mayor of Iloilo City
- In office June 30, 2010 – October 30, 2017
- Mayor: Jed Patrick Mabilog
- Preceded by: Jed Patrick Mabilog
- Succeeded by: Jeffrey Ganzon

Member of the Iloilo City Council from the Lone District
- In office 1989–1998

Personal details
- Born: Jose Sanson Espinosa III; June 20, 1956 (age 69) Iloilo City, Philippines
- Party: Nacionalista
- Spouse: Gina Agnes Divinagracia Sarabia
- Children: 4
- Parent(s): Jose “Mor” Espinosa Jr. Lolita V. Sanson
- Education: University of Iloilo High School
- Alma mater: University of San Agustin (BA)
- Occupation: Politician

Jose Sanson Espinosa III (born June 20, 1956), also known as Joe Espinosa III or simply Joe III, is a Filipino politician who served as mayor of Iloilo City from 2017 to 2019 and as vice mayor from 2010 to 2017.

== Early life ==
Espinosa III was born on June 20, 1956, in Iloilo City. He is the eighth child of Jose "Mor" Espinosa Jr. and Lolita V. Sanson.

At an early age, He attended and graduated from the A. Montes Elementary School, finished high school at the University of Iloilo, earned his bachelor's degree in political science and economics at the University of San Agustin, and later graduated from the School of Law and Graduate Studies at the same university.

== Political career ==
Espinosa III's political career earned prominence during his short term as City Legal Officer. He continued his political career as an Iloilo City Councilor for three consecutive terms, from 1989 to 1998. He was elected Iloilo City Vice Mayor in 2010 and served until his appointment in 2017 by the Department of Interior and Local Government (DILG) as the new mayor of Iloilo City after the dismissal order on Mayor Jed Patrick Mabilog. He served the remainder of Mabilog's term until 2019, after he lost his reelection against his brother-in-law and former Mayor of Iloilo City, Jerry Treñas.

In the 2022 election, he lost the congressman position race against reelectionist Iloilo City congresswoman Julienne Baronda, whom he defeated in the vice mayoral race in the 2010 elections.

== Personal life ==
Espinosa III is married to Gina Agnes Divinagracia Sarabia, a gemologist, and they have four daughters, namely: Regine Amparo, Maria Patricia, Beatrice Mary Agnes, and Ma. Christina Isabel.

Political offices
Preceded by Jed Patrick Mabilog	Vice Mayor of Iloilo City; 2010–2017	Succeeded by Jeffrey Ganzon
Preceded by Jed Patrick Mabilog	Mayor of Iloilo City; 2017–2019	Succeeded by Jerry Treñas
