= Mayor of Iloilo City =

Philippine government official

Mayor of the City of Iloilo
- Seal of the Iloilo City Mayor

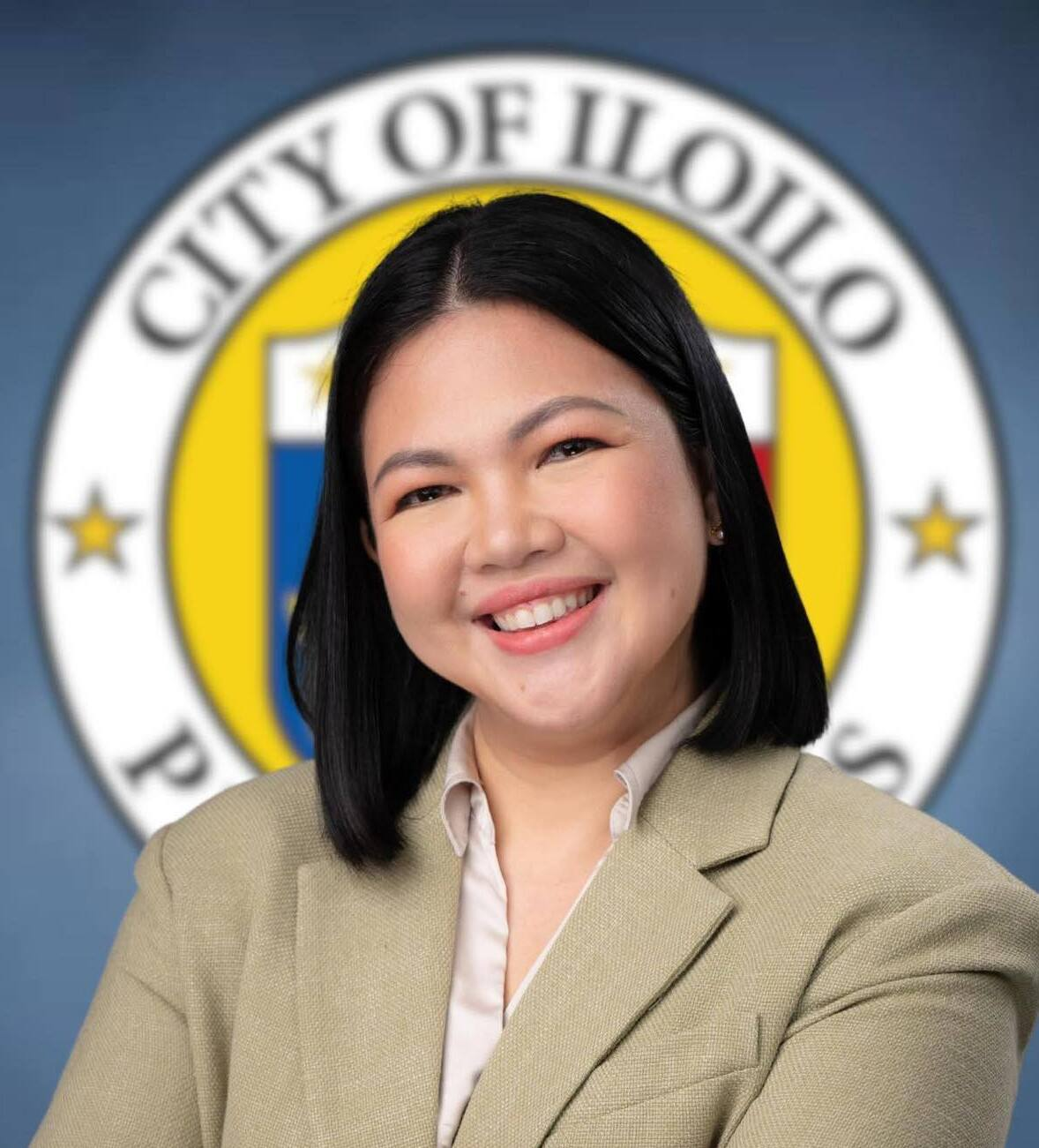
- Incumbent; Raisa Maria Lourdes S. Treñas-Chu since June 30, 2025
- Style: The Honorable
- Seat: Iloilo City Hall, Iloilo City
- Appointer: Elected via popular vote
- Term length: 3 years, not eligible for re-election immediately after three consecutive terms
- Inaugural holder: Jose Maria N. Gay
- Formation: 1900
- Website: City of Iloilo

The mayor of Iloilo City (Hiligaynon: Alcalde sang Ciudad sang Iloilo) is the head of the executive branch of government in Iloilo City, in the Philippines. The mayor holds office at the Iloilo City Hall in Iloilo City Proper. The mayor can serve for three consecutive terms only, although they can be elected again after an interruption of one term.

The current mayor is Raisa Treñas, a member of the National Unity Party (NUP). She won the 2025 mayoral election against businessman Roland Magahin with 169,617 total votes.

== List ==
=== Municipality of Iloilo (1900–1936) ===
No.	President	Term of office
1	Jose Maria N. Gay	1900–1901
2	Matias Ybiernas	1901–1902
3	Rosauro Jocson	1903–1904
4	Juan de León y Benedicto	1904–1905
(3)	Rosauro Jocson	1906–1909
5	Quirico Abeto	1910–1916
6	Gerardo Hervias	1917–1919
7	Vicente Ybiernas	1920–1922
8	Serapion Torre	1923–1925
9	Eulogio Garganera	1926–1931
10	Leopoldo Ganzon	1932–1934
(9)	Eulogio Garganera	1935–1936

=== City of Iloilo (1936–present) ===
No.	Image	Mayor	Term of office
1		Ramon Campos	1936–1941
2		Vicente Ybiernas	1941–1944
3		Mariano Benedicto	1945
4		Fernando Lopez Sr.	1945–1947
(2)		Vicente Ybiernas	1947–1949
5		Rafael Jalandoni	1950–1952
6		Juan Borja	1953
7		Dominador Jover	1954
8		Rodolfo Ganzon	1955–1961
9		Reinerio Ticao	1961–1971
(8)		Rodolfo Ganzon	1971–1972
10		Francisco Garganera	October 1972 – April 1976
11		Simeon Ledesma	May 1976 – April 1979
12		Luis Herrera	May 1979 – March 1986
13		Rosa O. Caram	April 1986 – November 1987
14		Antonio Hechanova	December 1987 – January 1988
(8)		Rodolfo Ganzon	February 1988 – June 1991
15		Mansueto Malabor	July 1991 – March 1992
16		Jerry P. Treñas	April 1992 – June 30, 1992
(15)		Mansueto Malabor	June 30, 1992 – June 30, 2001
(16)		Jerry P. Treñas	June 30, 2001 – June 30, 2010
17		Jed Patrick Mabilog	June 30, 2010 – October 30, 2017
18		Jose S. Espinosa III	October 30, 2017 – June 30, 2019
(16)		Jerry P. Treñas	June 30, 2019 – June 30, 2025
19		Raisa S. Treñas-Chu	June 30, 2025 – present
