= Jerry Treñas =

Filipino politician (born 1956)

The Honorable Jerry Treñas

16th Mayor of Iloilo City
- In office June 30, 2019 – June 30, 2025
- Vice Mayor: Jeffrey Ganzon
- Preceded by: Jose Espinosa III
- Succeeded by: Raisa Treñas
- In office June 30, 2001 – June 30, 2010
- Vice Mayor: Victor Facultad (2001–2004); Guillermo Dela Llana (2004–2007); Jed Patrick Mabilog (2007–2010)
- Preceded by: Mansueto Malabor
- Succeeded by: Jed Patrick Mabilog
- In office April 1992 – June 30, 1992
- Preceded by: Mansueto Malabor
- Succeeded by: Mansueto Malabor

Member of the Philippine House of Representatives from Iloilo City's lone district
- In office June 30, 2010 – June 30, 2019
- Preceded by: Raul T. Gonzalez, Jr.
- Succeeded by: Julienne Baronda

Member of the Iloilo City Council from the Lone District
- In office June 30, 1995 – June 30, 1998
- In office 1986 – June 30, 1992

Personal details
- Born: Buenaventura Geronimo Perez Treñas; December 4, 1956 (age 69) Molo, Iloilo City, Philippines
- Party: NUP (2018–present)
- Other political affiliations: Uswag Ilonggo (partylist; since 2020); PDP-Laban (2016–2018); Liberal (2010–2016); Nacionalista (2009–2010); Lakas (1992–1998; 2001–2009); PDSP (1970s); LAMMP (1998–2000)
- Children: 5, including Raisa
- Education: Ateneo de Manila University (B.A., LL.B)
- Occupation: Politician
- Website: Mayor of Iloilo City website

Buenaventura Geronimo Perez Treñas (born December 4, 1956), publicly known as Jerry P. Treñas, is a Filipino lawyer and politician who served as the mayor of Iloilo City from 2019 to 2025. He also previously served in that office from 2001 to 2010 and briefly in 1992. He also previously served as the Representative of Iloilo City from 2010 to 2019 and was a member of the Iloilo City Council from 1986 to 1992 and from 1995-1998.

== Early life ==
Treñas was born in Molo, Iloilo City to Efrain Blancaflor Treñas, a World War II veteran and former Constitutional Commissioner, and Soledad Perez-Treñas, a housewife. His grandfather, Potenciano Treñas, was a former Senator. He has an older sibling, Jose Mari. In 1978, he graduated from Ateneo de Manila University with a Bachelor of Arts in Political Science. Afterwards, he was hired by Baker McKenzie Law Firm while having pursued law and graduated with honors from the Ateneo de Manila University School of Law in 1982. He placed 11th in the 1982 Bar Examinations, with an average score of 88.325%.

He was inducted, alongside former Iloilo City Mayor Jed Patrick E. Mabilog, as an honorary alumnus of Central Philippine University.

== Political career ==
While studying at the Ateneo, Treñas joined the Partido Demokratiko Sosyalista ng Pilipinas and attended rallies against the martial law regime of President Ferdinand Marcos. Treñas said he was detained several times at Camp Aguinaldo, Camp Crame, and Bicutan.

Treñas taught law at the University of Iloilo from 1983 to 1986 before entering politics. He became a city councilor in 1986 and was reelected in 1988, serving until 1992 and elected again as no.1 city councilor in 1995 until 1998, when he assumed the position of acting mayor of Iloilo City by succession for only two months. He run for city mayor in 1998 under then Presidential candidate Vice President Joseph Estrada's LAMMP but defeated by Incumbent Mayor Mansueto Malabor. In 2001 he endorsed by then Term-Limited Mayor Malabor as the next city mayor, he was elected as the mayor of Iloilo City for three consecutive terms, serving until 2010. He is the only person elected to the position who won by a landslide in all precincts in the city during the 2004 and 2007 elections. From 2010 until 2019, he served as the congressman of the lone district of Iloilo City. In 2019, he ran for and was elected again as city mayor, defeating his brother-in-law, Jose Espinosa III.

In October 2024, Treñas announced that he would not run for reelection as mayor in the 2025 Philippine general election, citing health reasons, and instead endorsed his daughter, Raisa Treñas-Chu, to the position. After Raisa won the mayorship, she appointed her father as a special adviser on June 30, 2025. Following his retirement from active politics, Treñas returned to the academe as a political law instructor at West Visayas State University.

=== Controversy ===
In May 2024, Treñas apologised after he threatened to sue journalists covering the demolition of an art deco façade at the Iloilo Central Public Market dating from 1938 which sparked protests from heritage conservationists during a press conference, during which he publicly went into an outburst, with Daily Guardian (Iloilo) journalist Joey Marzan expressing belief that he was Treñas' target. On May 22, the Iloilo City Hall Press Corps issued a press release stating that they had forgiven him. Treñas subsequently filed a cyber-libel complaint against Nereo Lujan, a historian and information officer of the Iloilo provincial government for suggesting that the demolition was done despite a lack of permits. It is reported that the façade was structurally unstable and may needed to have been destroyed for safety's sake.

In July 2024, Lujan filed with the Ombudsman a complaint against Treñas for unlawful destruction of the Public Market's façade without the required clearance from the National Historical Commission of the Philippines. The market is a Cultural Tourism Heritage Zone, a Historic Center and a presumed important cultural property, under Section 5, R.A. 10066.

== Personal life ==
Treñas married Rosalie Sarabia, in 1984, who is actively involved in numerous public service projects in Iloilo City. They have five children: Raisa Maria Lourdes, Jose Carlo Tomas, Jose Maria Miguel, Geronimo Efrain Salvador, and Jose Juan Paolo.

=== Illness ===
On November 28, 2023, Treñas underwent a medical diagnosis for shingles. On December 4, after a coronary catheterization discovered blocked blood vessels, he underwent an angioplasty at The Medical City-Iloilo. In September, 2024, Treñas underwent a bile duct surgery in Manila.

Political offices
Preceded by Mansueto Malabor	Mayor of Iloilo City; April–June 1992	Succeeded by Mansueto Malabor
Preceded by Mansueto Malabor	Mayor of Iloilo City; 2001–2010	Succeeded by Jed Patrick Mabilog
Preceded by Jose Espinosa III	Mayor of Iloilo City; 2019–2025	Succeeded by Raisa Treñas
House of Representatives of the Philippines
Preceded by Raul T. Gonzalez, Jr.	Member of the House of Representatives from Iloilo City; 2010–2019	Succeeded by Julienne Baronda
