= Niel Tupas Jr. =

Filipino lawyer and politician (born 1970)

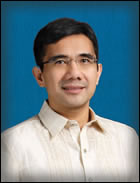
- Official portrait, 2013

Member of the House of Representatives from Iloilo's 5th district
- In office June 30, 2007 – June 30, 2016
- Preceded by: Rolex Suplico
- Succeeded by: Raul Tupas

Member of the Iloilo Provincial Board from the 5th district
- In office June 30, 2004 – June 30, 2007

Personal details
- Born: Niel Causing Tupas Jr. July 3, 1970 (age 56) Barotac Viejo, Iloilo, Philippines
- Party: NPC (2024–present); UGYON (local party; 2004–present)
- Other political affiliations: Liberal (2004–2024)
- Spouse: Yvonne Angeli Lee-Tupas
- Parent(s): Niel Tupas Sr. Myrna Causing
- Education: University of the Philippines Diliman (BA, LL.B)
- Occupation: Politician
- Profession: Lawyer

Niel "Junjun" Causing Tupas Jr. (born July 3, 1970) is a Filipino lawyer and politician. He served as a member of the Philippine House of Representatives representing the 5th District of Iloilo from 2007 to 2016.

== Personal life ==
He is the husband of Atty. Yvonne Angeli Lee Tupas. He is the son of former Iloilo governor Niel Tupas Sr., brother of Barotac Viejo mayor Niel Tupas III, and brother of Iloilo City councilor Lex Tupas.

=== Education ===
Tupas graduated from the University of the Philippines College of Law in 1998. He graduated in the top 20 of his batch. After graduating from law school, he took the bar exam in September 1998 and passed it.

== Early career ==
After passing the bar, he worked as an associate lawyer at the Belo Gozon Elma Parel Asuncion & Lucila Law Offices in Makati specializing in litigation and labor law. He was then promoted junior partner before he left the law firm to seek public office in 2004.

== Political career ==
He was elected No. 1 Board Member of the 5th District of Iloilo in 2004. Also in 2004, he was elected President of the National Movement of Young Legislators (NMYL), Western Visayas Chapter (Region VI). He was elected Congressman of the 5th District of Iloilo in 2007 and was re-elected in 2010 and 2013.

Tupas served as the Representative of the 5th District of Iloilo and a member of the Philippine Judicial and Bar Council (JBC). He is a member of the Liberal Party under the leadership of former President Benigno Aquino III. He was also the Chairman of the Committee on Justice in the House of Representatives. He was one of the prosecutors in the Impeachment Trial of Chief Justice Renato Corona.

=== Chief Justice Corona Impeachment ===
He has been assigned to be lead prosecutor for the impeachment of Supreme Court Chief Justice Renato Corona. Trial started on January 16, 2012, and ended May 29, 2012. An overwhelming majority of the senators voting 20–3, convicting the former Chief Justice for when he was found guilty of "committing culpable violation of the Constitution and betraying the public trust."
