= Legislative districts of Iloilo City =

Electoral constituencies of Iloilo City, Philippines.

The legislative districts of Iloilo City are the representations of the highly urbanized city of Iloilo in the various national legislatures of the Philippines. The city is currently represented in the lower house of the Congress of the Philippines through its lone congressional district.

== History ==
The territory of what is now Iloilo City initially formed part of the second district of Iloilo province in 1907. At the time of the passage of the Election Law (Act No. 1582) for the Philippine Legislature on January 9, 1907, Arevalo was a separate municipality, while the municipality of Iloilo was, by virtue of Act No. 719 of April 3, 1903, composed of the territories of the Spanish-era pueblos of Iloilo, Jaro, La Paz, Mandurriao and Molo. Jaro once again became a separate municipality by virtue of Executive Order No. 64 issued on December 24, 1907, while La Paz was re-established in 1920 by virtue of Executive Order No. 70 signed on October 11, 1919.

When seats for the upper house of the Philippine Legislature were elected from territory-based districts between 1916 and 1935, the then-municipalities of Arevalo, Iloilo (also encompassing Mandurriao and Molo), Jaro and La Paz — along with the rest of Iloilo province — formed part of the seventh senatorial district which elected two out of the 24-member senate. When the City of Iloilo was created in 1936 by merging the municipalities of Arevalo, Iloilo and La Paz, the new city remained within the second district of Iloilo province. Jaro, also part of the second district, was annexed to the city later in 1940.

In the disruption caused by the Second World War, two delegates represented the chartered city (separately from the province) in the National Assembly of the Japanese-sponsored Second Philippine Republic: one was the city mayor (an ex officio member), while the other was elected through an assembly of KALIBAPI members within the city during the Japanese occupation of the Philippines. Upon the restoration of the Philippine Commonwealth in 1945, the city's representation reverted to the second district of Iloilo province, of which it remained a part until 1972.

Iloilo City was represented in the Interim Batasang Pambansa as part of Region VI from 1978 to 1984. The city, along with the rest of the province of Iloilo, elected five representatives, at large, to the Regular Batasang Pambansa in the 1984 elections.

Iloilo City was provided its own congressional district under the new Constitution which was proclaimed on February 11, 1987. The new lone district elected members to the restored House of Representatives starting that same year.

== Current districts ==
Legislative Districts and Congressional Representatives of Iloilo City
District	Current Representative	Party	Administrative districts	Population (2020)	Area
Lone	Julienne L. Baronda (since 2019); Jaro	Lakas	List: Arevalo; Iloilo City Proper; Jaro; La Paz; Lapuz; Mandurriao; Molo	457,626	78.34 km^{2}

== See also ==
- Legislative districts of Iloilo
