= Iloilo City's at-large congressional district =

Legislative district of the Philippines

- Constituency for the House of Representatives of the Philippines
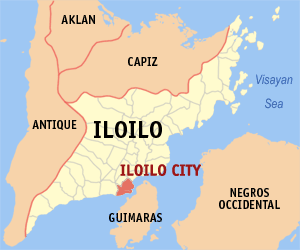
- Location of Iloilo City within Iloilo
- City: Iloilo City
- Region: Western Visayas
- Population: 457,626 (2020)
- Electorate: 330,470 (2022)
- Area: 78.34 km^{2} (30.25 sq mi)

Current constituency
- Created: 1943
- Representative: Julienne L. Baronda
- Political party: Lakas–CMD
- Congressional bloc: Majority

Iloilo City's at-large congressional district is the city-wide electoral district in Iloilo City, Philippines. It has been electing representatives at-large to the House of Representatives since 1987 and earlier to the National Assembly from 1943 to 1944.

The district was first formed ahead of the 1943 Philippine legislative election following the ratification of the Second Philippine Republic constitution which called for a unicameral legislature composed of delegates from all provinces and chartered cities in the country. Iloilo, a chartered city since 1936, elected Fortunato R. Ybiernas to the National Assembly, who was joined by then-mayor Vicente R. Ybiernas as an appointed second delegate. The district became inactive following the restoration of the House of Representatives in 1945 when the city reverted to its old provincial constituency of Iloilo's 2nd congressional district. In the unicameral Batasang Pambansa that replaced the House, Iloilo City was not entitled to its own separate representation despite being a highly-urbanized city. Instead, it formed part of the multi-member Region VI's at-large district for the interim parliament from 1978 to 1984 and Iloilo's at-large district in the regular parliament from 1984 to 1986. The city-wide electoral district was only restored in 1987 under a new constitution.

The district is currently represented in the 19th Congress by Julienne L. Baronda of the Lakas–CMD.

== Representation history ==
#	Term of office		National Assembly	Seat A				Seat B			
#	Start	End	National Assembly	Image	Member	Party	Electoral history	Image	Member	Party	Electoral history
=== Iloilo City's at-large district for the National Assembly (Second Philippine Republic) ===
District created September 7, 1943.
–	September 25, 1943	February 2, 1944	1st		Fortunato R. Ybiernas	KALIBAPI	Elected in 1943.		Vicente R. Ybiernas	KALIBAPI	Appointed as an ex officio member.
District dissolved into Iloilo's 2nd district.
#	Term of office		Congress	Single seat				Seats eliminated			
#	Start	End	Congress	Image	Member	Party	Electoral history	Seats eliminated			
=== Iloilo City's at-large district for the House of Representatives of the Philippines ===								Seats eliminated			
District re-created February 2, 1987 from Iloilo's at-large district.								Seats eliminated			
1	June 30, 1987	June 30, 1995	8th		Rafael J. Lopez Vito	UNIDO	Elected in 1987.	Seats eliminated			
1	June 30, 1987	June 30, 1995	9th		Rafael J. Lopez Vito	Lakas	Re-elected in 1992.	Seats eliminated			
2	June 30, 1995	June 30, 2004	10th		Raul M. Gonzalez	Nacionalista	Elected in 1995.	Seats eliminated			
2	June 30, 1995	June 30, 2004	11th		Raul M. Gonzalez	Nacionalista	Re-elected in 1998.	Seats eliminated			
2	June 30, 1995	June 30, 2004	12th		Raul M. Gonzalez	Nacionalista	Re-elected in 2001.	Seats eliminated			
3	June 30, 2004	June 30, 2010	13th		Raul T. Gonzalez Jr.	Lakas	Elected in 2004.	Seats eliminated			
3	June 30, 2004	June 30, 2010	14th		Raul T. Gonzalez Jr.	Lakas	Re-elected in 2007.	Seats eliminated			
4	June 30, 2010	June 30, 2019	15th		Jerry P. Treñas	Liberal	Elected in 2010.	Seats eliminated			
4	June 30, 2010	June 30, 2019	16th		Jerry P. Treñas	Liberal	Re-elected in 2013.	Seats eliminated			
4	June 30, 2010	June 30, 2019	17th		Jerry P. Treñas	NUP	Re-elected in 2016.	Seats eliminated			
5	June 30, 2019	Incumbent	18th		Julienne L. Baronda	NUP	Elected in 2019.	Seats eliminated			
5	June 30, 2019	Incumbent	19th		Julienne L. Baronda	NUP	Re-elected in 2022.	Seats eliminated			
5	June 30, 2019	Incumbent	20th		Julienne L. Baronda	Lakas	Re-elected in 2025.	Seats eliminated			

== Election results ==
=== 2022 ===
2022 Philippine House of Representatives elections
Party	Candidate	Votes	%
NUP	Julienne Baronda (incumbent)	147,834	62.88
Nacionalista	Jose Espinosa III	84,168	35.80
Independent	Juni Espinosa	1,666	0.71
Independent	Rudy Bantolo	1,445	0.61
Total votes		253,113	100.00
NUP hold			

=== 2019 ===
2019 Philippine House of Representatives elections
Party	Candidate	Votes	%
NUP	Julienne Baronda	115,148	
PMP	Joshua Alim	74,012	
Nacionalista	"Inday" Perla Zulueta	15,003	
PDDS	Lucio Encio	1,238	
Total votes			
NUP hold			

== See also ==
- Legislative districts of Iloilo City
