= Julienne Baronda =

Filipina politician

Julienne L. Baronda
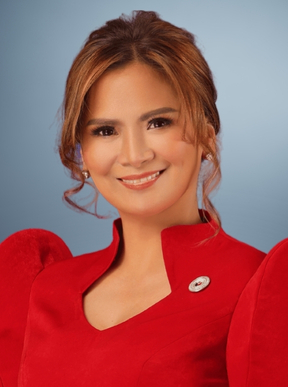
- Official portrait, 2025

Deputy Majority Leader of the House of Representatives of the Philippines
- Incumbent
- Assumed office July 29, 2025 Serving with several others
- House Speaker: Martin Romualdez

Member of the Philippine House of Representatives from Iloilo City's Lone District
- Incumbent
- Assumed office June 30, 2019
- Preceded by: Jerry P. Treñas

Member of the Iloilo City Council
- In office June 30, 2013 – June 30, 2019

Personal details
- Born: February 16, 1979 (age 47) Iloilo City, Philippines
- Party: Lakas (2007–2009; 2024-present)
- Other political affiliations: NUP (2018–2024); Liberal (2015–2018); Independent (2012–2015); PMP (2009–2012)
- Education: Guimaras State University (MPA)
- Occupation: Politician

Julienne "Jam-Jam" Linaogo Baronda (born February 16, 1979), is a Filipino politician who is currently serving as congresswoman of the lone legislative district of Iloilo City since 2019.

== Public service ==
Baronda's public service started in 1996 when she served as the president of Sangguniang Kabataan (SK), a division of the government dedicated to the orientation of well-being for the youth, at the young age of 17. In 2019, she was elected as congresswoman of the lone legislative district of Iloilo City under the National Unity Party (NUP) banner.

Baronda was a former Iloilo City Councilor and Chief Political Officer of the office of former senator JV Ejercito.

== Education ==
She also earned her master's degree in public administration in Guimaras State University in the same year.

House of Representatives of the Philippines
Preceded by Jerry P. Treñas	Member of the House of Representatives from Iloilo City's at-large district 2019–present	Incumbent
