= Lex Tupas =

Filipino politician

Nielex Causing Tupas

Member of the Iloilo City Council
- In office June 30, 2007 – June 30, 2016

Personal details
- Born: August 11, 1979 (age 47) Iloilo City, Philippines
- Party: Liberal (2009–present); Ugyon (local party; 2007–present)
- Education: La Salle Green Hills; Ateneo de Manila University; Central Philippine University; University of the Philippines
- Occupation: Filipino politician and public servant

Nielex 'Lex' Tupas (born August 11, 1979) is a Filipino public servant. He was born in Iloilo City, and is the youngest son of former Iloilo Governor Niel Tupas Sr., who also held several other mayor and congressman positions in Iloilo.

In the May 2007 local elections, he was elected as the youngest city councilor at the age of 27 with about 73,000 votes. He was then re-elected twice as number 1 city councilor of Iloilo City with more or less 93,000 votes (2010) and 125,000 votes (2013). He was also appointed as the chief operating officer and executive director of the National Youth Commission.

== Career ==
Tupas became one of the youngest teachers/lecturers in Iloilo City at age 25 when he was asked to be the research and economics consultant of Iloilo National High School. He was ranked as the number one teacher for School Year 2005-2006. He was also one of the youngest post-graduate degree professors of the Philippine Christian University, the St. Roberts International Academy and John B. Lacson Department of Information Technology at age 25.

He is a former board of director and chairman of the Youth Leadership Excellence Awards of the Junior Chamber International Iloilo Chapter

He decided to transfer his residency in Iloilo City in 2005 and made a successful run as city councilor. He obtained the biggest mandate for a first time candidate without any political background by obtaining 73,000 votes.

He is the youngest official of the city who was elected citywide at age 27. He is also the first son of an incumbent provincial governor to have won a seat in the City of Iloilo and the first new resident of less than 2 years in the city on the day of the May 2007 elections to win a seat.

He is one of the youngest political party chairmen. He is the city chairman of UGYON Party He is a radio anchor/newspaper columnist and cable TV anchor

He has authored a number of meaningful legislative measures for the improvement and continued progress of Iloilo City and has initiated a number of innovative special programs and project that focus especially on children, the youth, women and the elderly.

== Education ==
He earned his Masters in Public Management major in Local Government Administration when he was 27 years old and proceeded to earn his Doctor of Management with concentration in Public Management from the Central Philippine University at the age of 30.
