= Barotac Viejo =

Municipality in Iloilo, Philippines

- Municipality
- Municipality of Barotac Viejo
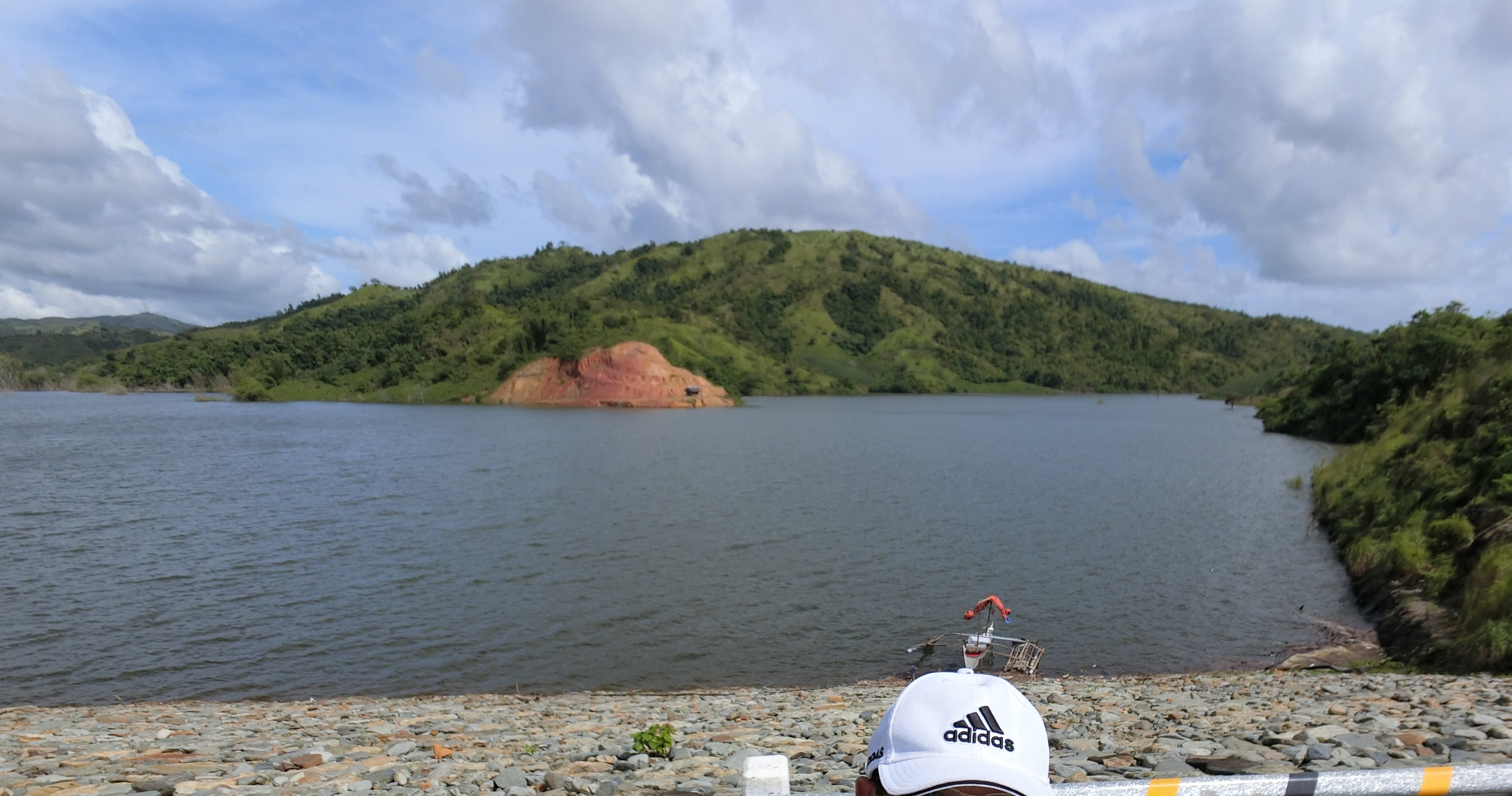
- Barotac Viejo Dam

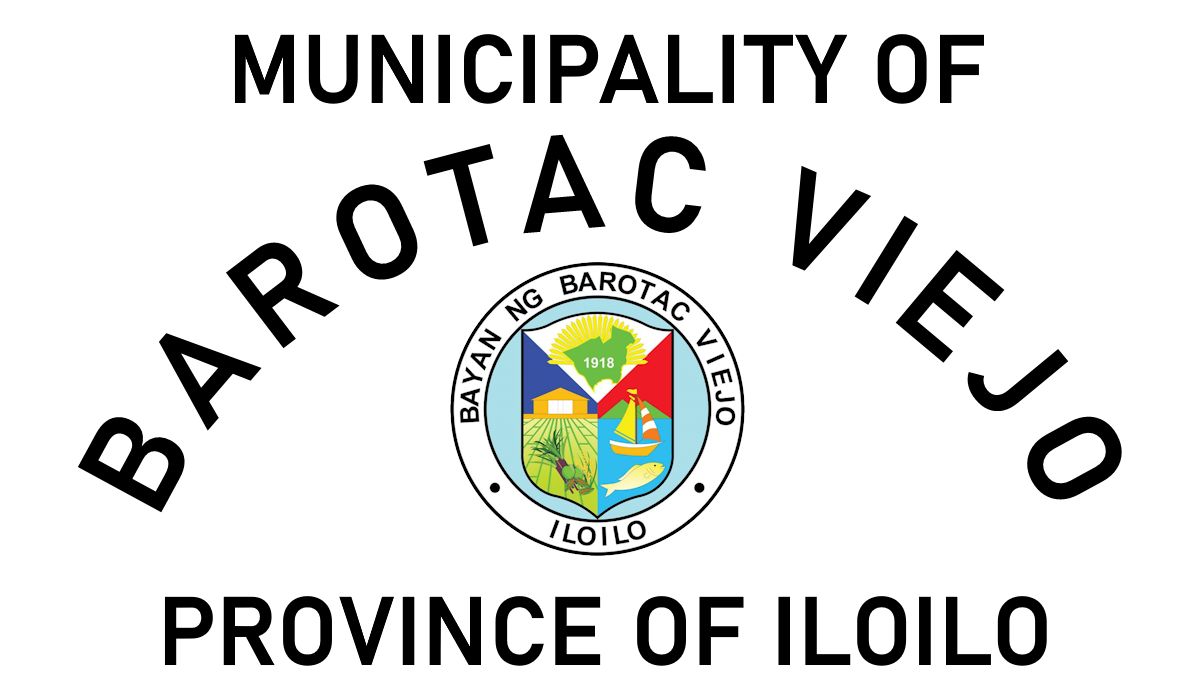
- Flag Seal
- Motto: Asenso Barotac Viejo!
- Anthem: Barotac Viejo Hymn
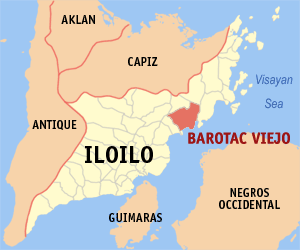
- Map of Iloilo with Barotac Viejo highlighted
- Interactive map of Barotac Viejo
- Location within the Philippines
- Coordinates: 11°03′N 122°51′E
- Country: Philippines
- Region: Western Visayas
- Province: Iloilo
- District: 5th district
- Barangays: 26 (see Barangays)

Government
  - Type: Sangguniang Bayan
  - Mayor: Nielo C. Tupas (Lakas)
  - Vice Mayor: Vivian V. Buenavista (Ind)
  - Representative: Binky April M. Tupas (Lakas)
  - Municipal Council: Members: Honielette D. Engada (Ind); Fermin B. Barretto (Lakas); Abelardo B. Engada, Jr. (Ind); Eddie B. Lumampao (Ind); Alain Dominic T. Jaranilla (Lakas); Maricel A. Estrabon (Lakas); Joseph B. Espada (Lakas); Eugene V. Legaste (Lakas); Jesus T. Balila ^{‡}; Kurt Denzel E. Damires ^{◌}; ‡ ex officio ABC president; ◌ ex officio SK chairman
  - Electorate: 32,011 voters (2025)

Area
  - Total: 185.78 km^{2} (71.73 sq mi)
- Elevation: 66 m (217 ft)
- Highest elevation: 579 m (1,900 ft)
- Lowest elevation: 0 m (0 ft)

Population (2024 census)
  - Total: 49,736
  - Density: 267.71/km^{2} (693.38/sq mi)
  - Households: 12,491

Economy
  - Income class: 1st municipal income class
  - Poverty incidence: 18.43% (2023)
  - Revenue: ₱ 238.7 million (2024)
  - Assets: ₱ 1,004 million (2024)
  - Expenditure: ₱ 160.4 million (2024)
  - Liabilities: ₱ 340.6 million (2024)

Service provider
  - Electricity: Iloilo 3 Electric Cooperative (ILECO 3)
- Time zone: UTC+8 (PST)
- ZIP code: 5011
- PSGC: 063008000
- IDD : area code: +63 (0)33
- Native languages: Hiligaynon; Ati; Tagalog

Barotac Viejo, officially the Municipality of Barotac Viejo (Hiligaynon: Banwa sang Barotac Viejo, Kinaray-a: Banwa ka Barotac Viejo, Tagalog: Bayan ng Barotac Viejo), is a municipality in the province of Iloilo, Philippines. According to the 2024 census, it has a population of 49,736 people.

== History ==
In 1957, the sitio of Poscolon in the barrio of Calaigang was converted into a barrio. The same law was reenacted in 1959, probably indicating resistance to the renaming.

== Geography ==
Barotac Viejo is in the northern part of the Province of Iloilo, facing the strait of Guimaras and the island of Negros. It is bounded on the north by San Rafael, on the west by Banate, on the south by the Visayan Sea, and on the east by Ajuy. It is 57 kilometres (35 mi) from Iloilo City and 18 kilometres (11 mi) from San Rafael.

The total land area of 18,578 hectares (45,910 acres).

=== Topography and land features ===
A range of sprawling hills and high mountains occupy three quarters of the land of Barotac Viejo. Mount Agumid on the northern boundary with San Rafael is the highest mountain, at about 550 meters high.

The town is divided by a long mountain range into upper and lower regions. The upper region, about 1,000 feet above sea level, experiences cooler temperatures and more abundant rainfall. The lower region, located near the sea, is well populated and primarily dedicated to rice cultivation.

=== Water sources ===
Barotac Viejo is served by two rivers, namely the Barotac Viejo River and the Barotac Cayo River, along with several creeks and springs.

The Barotac Viejo River is the longest and the widest river passing through the heart of the town. It never runs dry, although it occasionally overflows during heavy rains. The river is used for bathing, laundry, and fishing.

The municipality has approximately 10 miles of shallow shorelines, with nearby fishponds supporting local aquaculture.

=== Climate ===
Climate data for Barotac Viejo, Iloilo
Month	Jan	Feb	Mar	Apr	May	Jun	Jul	Aug	Sep	Oct	Nov	Dec	Year
Mean daily maximum °C (°F)	28 (82)	29 (84)	30 (86)	32 (90)	32 (90)	31 (88)	30 (86)	29 (84)	29 (84)	29 (84)	29 (84)	28 (82)	30 (85)
Mean daily minimum °C (°F)	23 (73)	23 (73)	23 (73)	24 (75)	25 (77)	25 (77)	25 (77)	24 (75)	24 (75)	24 (75)	24 (75)	23 (73)	24 (75)
Average precipitation mm (inches)	57 (2.2)	37 (1.5)	41 (1.6)	42 (1.7)	98 (3.9)	155 (6.1)	187 (7.4)	162 (6.4)	179 (7.0)	188 (7.4)	114 (4.5)	78 (3.1)	1,338 (52.8)
Average rainy days	12.0	7.7	9.2	10.2	19.5	24.6	26.9	25.1	25.5	25.2	18.0	13.0	216.9
Source: Meteoblue

Rainy season sets in about May and last up to the middle of January. The rainfall in the upper region is comparatively heavier than the lower region. This is due to the chain of high mountains surrounding the place and innumerable springs that flow along the foot of the hills the heaviest rainfall occurs about in the early part of September during the southwest monsoon. Under usual condition, Barotac Viejo receives up to 100 centimetres (39 in) of rainfall. The average however in the upper region is 42 centimetres (17 in) and in the lower region 36 centimetres (14 in). Dry season sets in a little earlier in the lower region than in the upper region.

=== Barangays ===
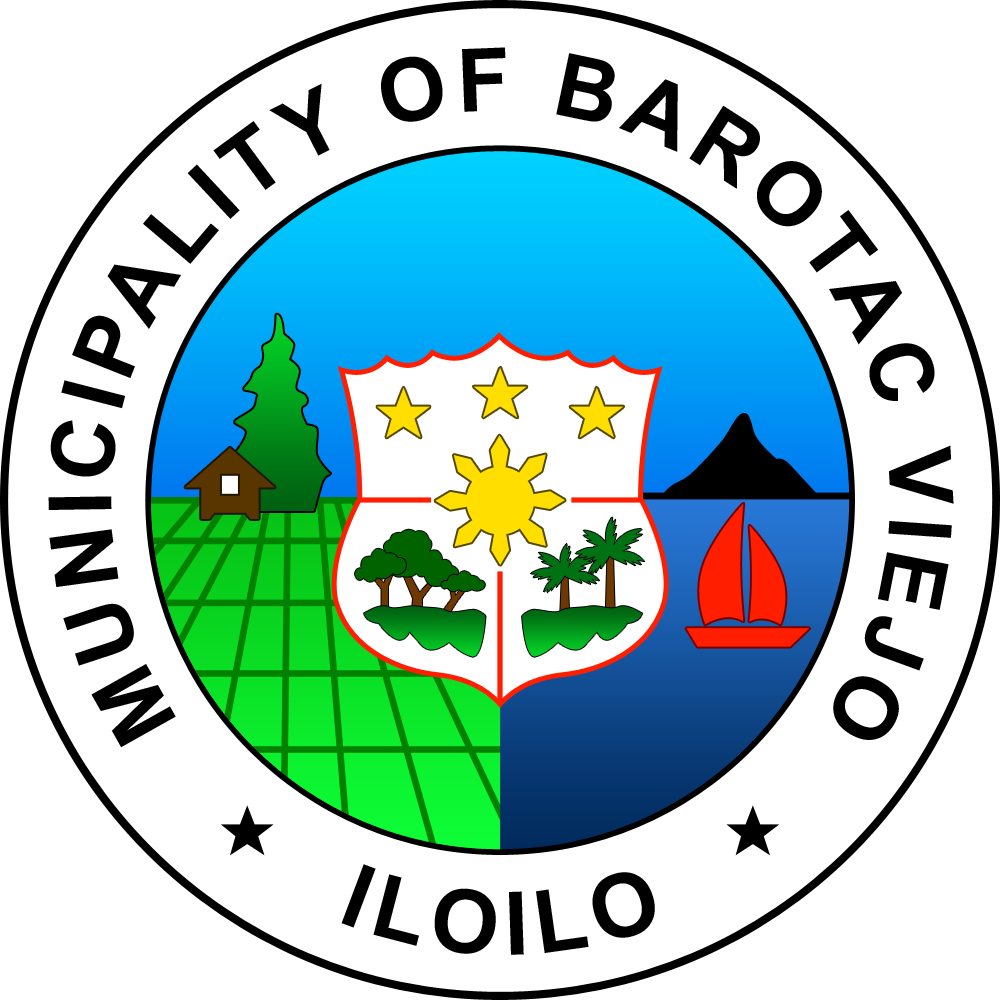
Former seal of Barotac Viejo

Barotac Viejo is politically subdivided into 26 barangays. Each barangay consists of puroks and some have sitios.

- Bugnay
- California
- Del Pilar
- De la Peña
- General Luna
- La Fortuna
- Lipata
- Natividad
- Nueva Invencion
- Nueva Sevilla
- Poblacion
- Puerto Princesa
- Rizal
- San Antonio
- San Fernando
- San Francisco
- San Geronimo
- San Juan
- San Lucas
- San Miguel
- San Roque
- Santiago
- Santo Domingo
- Santo Tomas
- Ugasan
- Vista Alegre

== Demographics ==
Population census of Barotac Viejo
Year	Pop.	±% p.a.
1903	5,339	—
1918	7,254	+2.06%
1939	13,542	+3.02%
1948	16,732	+2.38%
1960	26,051	+3.76%
1970	14,655	−5.58%
1975	20,169	+6.61%
1980	24,135	+3.65%
1990	31,660	+2.75%
1995	33,652	+1.15%
2000	36,314	+1.65%
2007	39,326	+1.11%
2010	41,470	+1.95%
2015	45,808	+1.91%
2020	48,614	+1.26%
2024	49,736	+0.55%
Source: Philippine Statistics Authority

In the 2024 census, the population of Barotac Viejo was 49,736 people, with a density of 270 inhabitants per square kilometre or 700 inhabitants per square mile.

== Economy ==
Poverty incidence of Barotac Viejo

Source: Philippine Statistics Authority

== Education ==
The Barotac Viejo Schools District Office governs all educational institutions within the municipality. It oversees the management and operations of all private and public, from primary to secondary schools.

Primary and elementary schools

- Barotac Viejo Baptist Learning Center
- Bugnay Sur Primary School
- California Primary School
- De La Peña Primary School
- Del Pilar Primary School
- Doane Barotac Viejo Christian School
- Gen. Luna Elementary School
- La Fortuna Elementary School
- Nagpana Primary School
- Natividad Primary School
- Nueva Invencion Elementary School
- Nueva Sevilla Elementary School
- Puerto Princesa Primary School
- Raul O. V. Causing Memorial School
- Rizal Primary School
- San Antonio Elementary School
- San Fernando Primary School
- San Francisco Primary School
- San Geronimo Primary School
- San Juan Elementary School
- San Lucas Elementary School
- San Miguel Elementary School
- San Roque Primary School
- Santiago Elementary School
- St. Paul School
- Sts. Peter and Paul Parochial School
- Sto. Tomas Elementary School
- Sto. Domingo Elementary School
- Ugasan Elementary School
- Vista Alegre Elementary School

Secondary schools

- Barotac Viejo National High School
- Gen. Luna National High School
- Lipata Integrated School
- San Antonio National High School
- Santiago National High School
