= Jonathan Tan =

Jonathan Tan may refer to:

- Jonathan Tan (footballer) (born 1995), Singaporean footballer
- Jonathan Tan (politician) born 1976), Filipino politician and businessman
- Jonathan Tan (swimmer) (born 2002), Singaporean swimmer
