= 2019 Olongapo local elections =

Part of the 2019 Philippine general election

2019 Olongapo mayoral election
- May 13, 2019
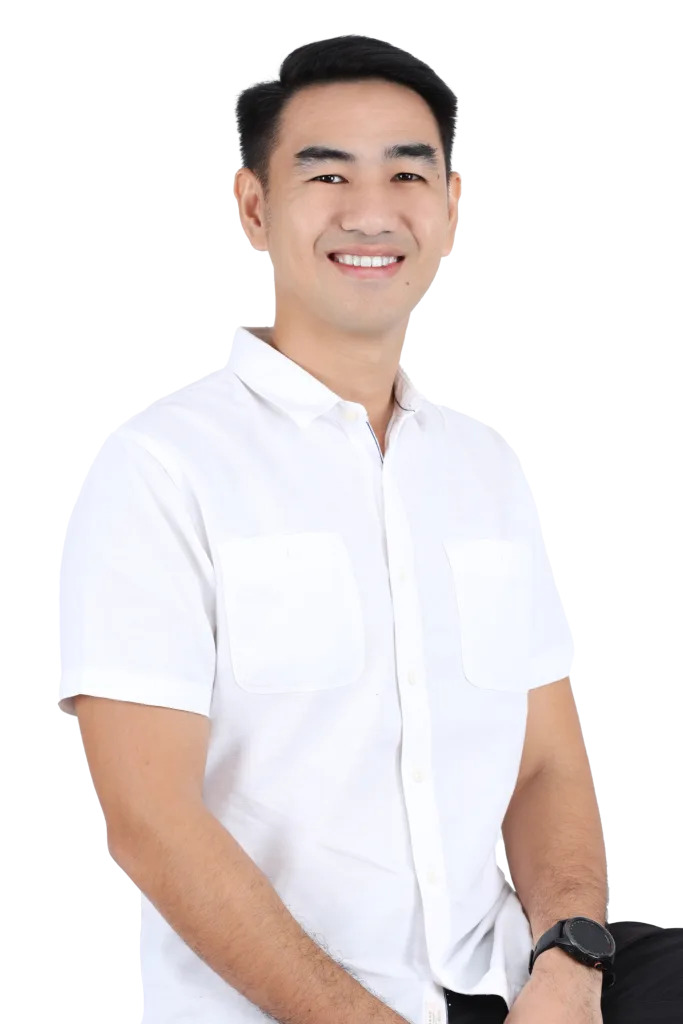

Nominee	Rolen Paulino Jr.	Anne Marie Gordon
Party	Nacionalista	Lakas
Running mate	Noel Atienza	Ed Piano
Popular vote	58,131	26,859
Mayor before election
Rolen Paulino Sr.
Liberal
Elected mayor
Rolen Paulino Jr.
Nacionalista

Local elections were held in Olongapo City on May 13, 2019 in the Philippine general election. The voters elected a mayor, vice-mayor, and ten councilors.

== Mayoralty Election ==
The incumbent Mayor, Rolen Paulino, was running for reelection from the Nacionalista Party.

His opponent is Anne Gordon, the former Vice-Governor of Zambales. Gordon is married to the former Olongapo Mayor, James "Bong" Gordon Jr. She is running under the banner of Lakas–CMD.

On November 29, 2018, Paulino withdrew his certificate of candidacy and was replaced by his son Atty. Rolen Paulino Jr. According to Mayor Paulino, his decision was due to the current suspension order and subsequent case filed against him.

== Candidates ==
=== Mayor ===
Olongapo City Mayoralty Election
Party	Candidate	Votes	%
Nacionalista	Rolen Paulino Jr.	58,131	
Lakas	Anne Marie Gordon	26,859	
Total votes		84,990	100

=== Vice Mayor ===
Olongapo City Vice Mayoralty Election
Party	Candidate	Votes	%
Independent	Aquilino Cortez Jr.	38,792	
PFP	Jacinto Gardon	17,633	
Nacionalista	Noel Atienza	16,121	
Independent	Eduardo Piano	8,323	
Independent	Roberto Flores	1,108	
Total votes		81,977	100

=== Councilors ===
==== Team Paulino ====
Nacionalista Party/Team Paulino
Name	Party
Jerome Michael Bacay	Nacionalista
Linus Bacay	Nacionalista
BJ Cajudo	Nacionalista
Jamiel Khonghun Escalona	Nacionalista
Ed Guerrero	Nacionalista
Lugie Lipumano	Nacionalista
Francis Ela Maniago	Nacionalista
Winnie Ortiz	Nacionalista
Basilio Palo	Nacionalista
Cristabelle Marie Paulino	Nacionalista

==== Serbisyong may Puso ====
Lakas–CMD/Serbisyong may Puso
Name	Party
Ernelizar Batapa	Lakas
Earl Escusa	Lakas
Edgardo Gingco	Lakas
Cesar Lobos	Lakas
Jose Tomas Madria	Lakas
Rosalinda Reyes	Lakas
Hilario Rin	Lakas
Josefina Soberon	Lakas
Filipina Tablan	Lakas

Councilors
Party	Candidate	Votes	%
Nacionalista	Cristabelle Marie "Tata" Paulino	52,512	
Nacionalista	Sarah Lugerna "Lugie" Lipumano	52,410	
Nacionalista	Jamiel Khonghun Escalona	43,730	
PFP	Rodel Cerezo	43,135	
Nacionalista	Benjamin Cajudo II	41,362	
Aksyon	Kaye Ann Legaspi	38,502	
Nacionalista	Jerome Michael Bacay	36,651	
Nacionalista	Eduardo Guerrero	30,653	
Nacionalista	Emerito Linus Bacay	29,399	
Nacionalista	Alreuela Ortiz	27,744	
PFP	Vicente "Vic-Vic" Magsaysay II	24,999	
Nacionalista	Basilio Palo	21,047	
PFP	Edwin Piano	20,210	
Independent	Rodolfo Catologan	19,413	
Nacionalista	Francis Maniago	19,014	
Lakas	Jose Tomas Madria	16,243	
PDP–Laban	Melanie Joy "Joy Macapagal" Macapagal-Driz	14,676	
Lakas	Ernelizar Batapa	14,279	
Lakas	Filipina Tablan	13,895	
Independent	Patrick Escusa	13,440	
Independent	Ronald Guevarra	12,554	
PFP	Erma Manalang	12,278	
Lakas	Cesar Lobos	11,980	
PFP	Celson Miraflor	10,671	
Aksyon	Michael Alop	9,735	
PFP	Joseph "Joel" Lim III	8,296	
Independent	Rowena Quejada	7,075	
Akbayan	Conrad Hipolito	6,985	
Independent	Jan Giuseppe Abarro	6,761	
Lakas	Edgardo Gingco	6,739	
Independent	Milbert Adlawan	6,711	
Independent	Rosalinda Reyes	6,502	
Independent	Hilario Rin	6,429	
Independent	Earl Escusa	6,143	
Independent	Gerardo Cruz	5,365	
Lakas	Josefina Soberon	4,829	
Independent	Arsenio Antiquera	1,219	
Independent	Fernandito Lañada	1,186	
Total votes		704,772	100.00
