= Randy Escolango =

Filipino government official

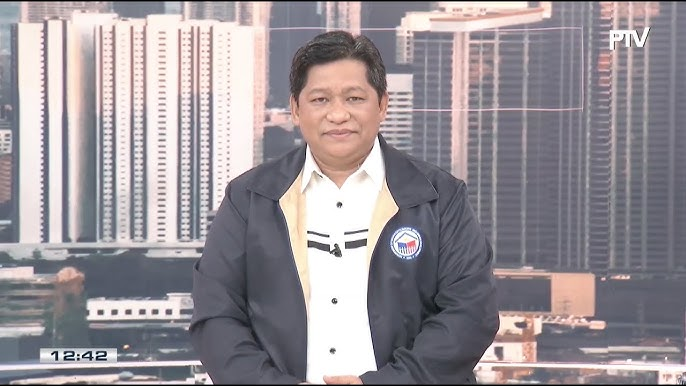

Undersecretary at Department of Health
- Incumbent
- Assumed office August 1, 2025
- President: Bongbong Marcos

Undersecretary at Department of Human Settlements and Urban Development
- In office July 12, 2023 – July 31, 2025
- President: Bongbong Marcos

Undersecretary at Department of Labor and Employment
- In office March 1, 2022 – July 19, 2022
- President: Rodrigo Duterte, Bongbong Marcos

Deputy Insurance Commissioner at Insurance Commission
- In office September 20, 2017 – February 28, 2022
- President: Rodrigo Duterte

OIC Administrator and Chief Executive Officer at Subic Bay Metropolitan Authority
- In office October 19, 2016 – January 20, 2017
- President: Rodrigo Duterte

Personal details
- Born: Randy Bacolor Escolango; September 26, 1976 (age 50) Cabanatuan, Nueva Ecija
- Education: New Era University (BA); Far Eastern University (LL.B., B.Acc.); Virgen de los Remedios College (MPM); Eulogio "Amang" Rodriguez Institute of Science and Technology (DPA)
- Occupation: Public servant, university professor

Randy Escolango (born September 26, 1976) is a Filipino public official who currently serves as an Undersecretary of Department of Health. Escolango previously served as Undersecretary at Department of Human Settlements and Urban Development, Undersecretary at Department of Labor and Employment, Deputy Insurance Commissioner at Insurance Commission, and OIC Administrator and chief executive officer at Subic Bay Metropolitan Authority.

== Early life and education ==
Escolango was born on September 26, 1976 to Adelmo Escolango and Francisca Bacolor in Cabanatuan, Nueva Ecija. In 1997, he obtained his Bachelor of Arts in Political Science from the New Era University (NEU). He then finished his Bachelor of Laws at the Far Eastern University (FEU) in 2001. The year after, in 2002, Escolango passed the Philippine Bar Examinations.

Prior to his appointment as a government official, Escolango first entered government service as a clerk at the Metropolitan Trial Court Branch 4 of Manila, where he was elected in 2000 as the President of the Judicial Court Clerks Association of the Philippines (JCCAP) Manila Chapter. Thereafter, he was a private law practitioner and university professor.

== Career ==
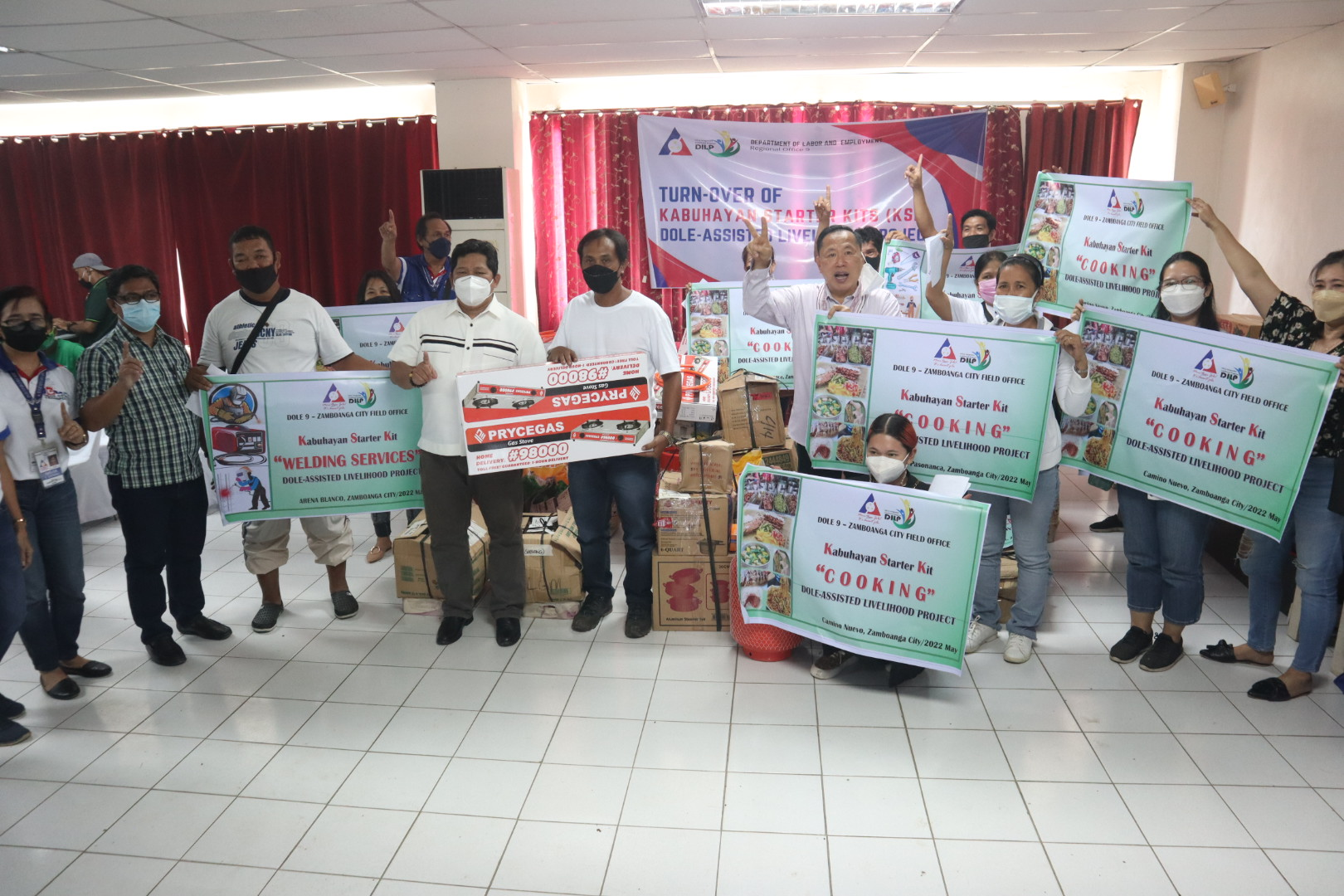
Escolango leading the Tulong Panghanapbuhay sa Ating Displaced/Disadvantaged Workers (TUPAD) Program Distribution of the Department of Labor and Employment in 2022.

On May 4, 2010, Escolango began his service as deputy administrator for legal affairs at the Subic Bay Metropolitan Authority (SBMA). Later, on October 19, 2016, President Rodrigo Duterte through Executive Secretary Salvador Medialdea designated him as the SBMA's OIC Administrator and chief executive officer. During his tenure, SBMA was recognized by the 2016 Asia CEO Awards as the "Executive Leadership Team of the Year," and the 2017 International Finance Awards as "Asia’s Fastest Growing Free Trade Zone."

In 2017, Escolango was appointed as Deputy Insurance Commissioner at Insurance Commission (IC). He was among the IC officials credited for facilitating the rapid growth of the insurance industry during the Administration of President Duterte. While serving as Deputy Insurance Commissioner, the Philippine Coast Guard promoted Escolango as a rear admiral of the Philippine Coast Guard Auxiliary (PCGA). He first joined the PCGA in 2014, where he spearheaded a number of notable projects, including the building of artificial coral reefs in Subic Bay. It was also during his service in the IC that Escolango wrote extensively on insurance-related topics, particularly through The Manila Times and FrontpagePH.

On March 1, 2022, Escolango was appointed as Undersecretary at Department of Labor and Employment.

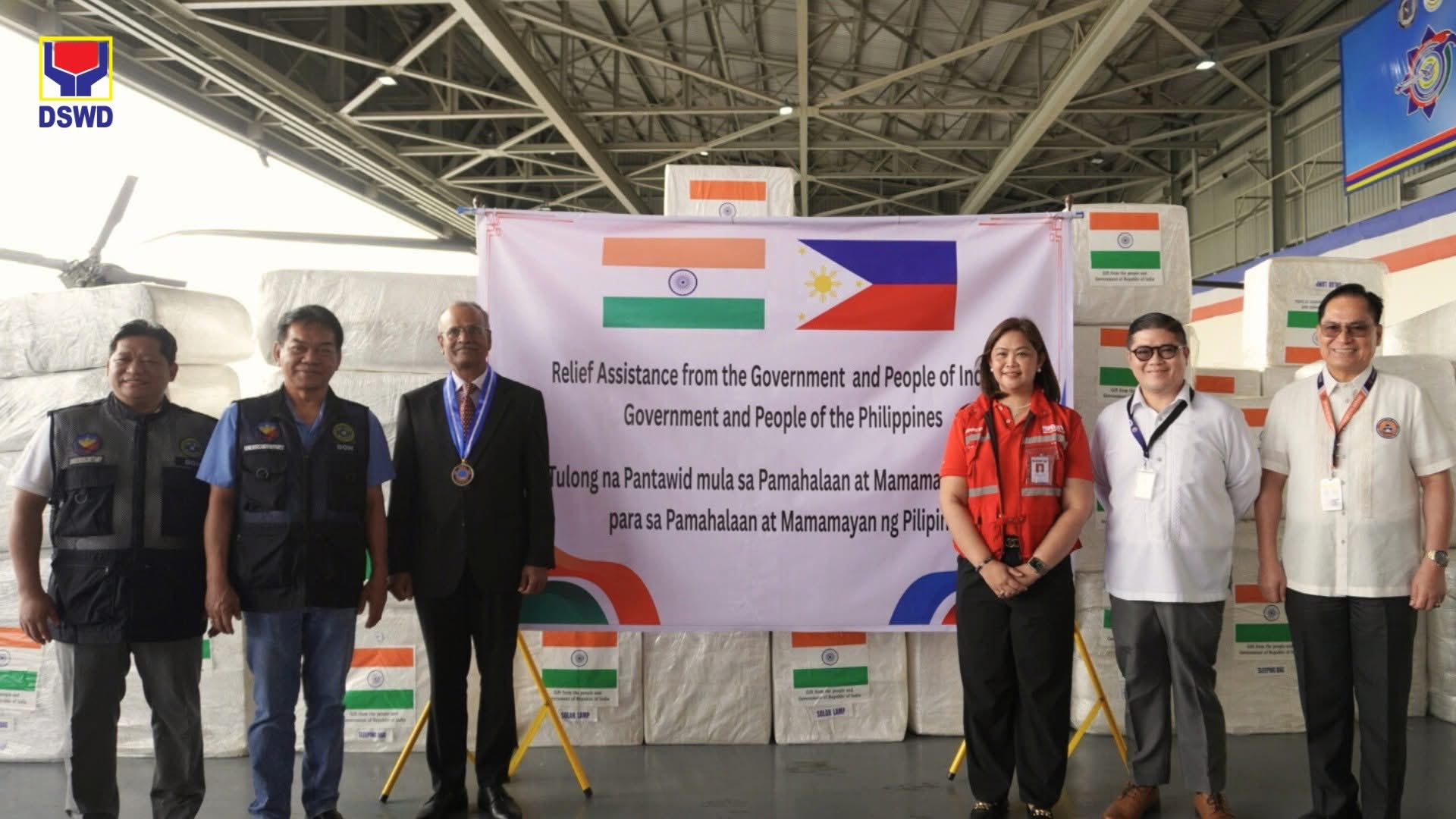
Escolango (far left) representing the Department of Health during the turnover of humanitarian assistance to the Philippines from the Government of India in 2026.

On July 12, 2023, Escolango was appointed by President Bongbong Marcos as Undersecretary at Department of Human Settlements and Urban Development (DHSUD). As a DHSUD executive, he served as Undersecretary for Pasig River Urban Development (PRUD), Administrative Service, Finance Service, Legal Service, Strategic Communications and Public Affairs Service, Knowledge Management and Information Systems Service, Homeowners Associations and Community Development Bureau, National Drive Against Professional Squatters and Squatting Syndicates, and Disaster Response. He likewise served as the Undersecretary in charge of the Department's Resettlement Implementation Coordinator Project Management Office with the Department of Transportation. Among his tasks as Undersecretary for Disaster Response was the implementation of the DHSUD's Integrated Disaster Shelter Assistance Program (IDSAP), the national government's major shelter assistance program for calamity victims. Escolango was also designated as chairperson of the Technical Working Group for the celebration of the National Shelter Month, the Philippine expanded version of the country's observance of World Habitat Day. As one of the hosts of the DHSUD Kapihan sa Radyo, a weekly radio program aired by the Presidential Broadcast Service, Escolango was among the key figures highlighting the agency's major initiatives, including the 4PH, IDSAP, PRUD, which is focused on environmental and urban renewal, and PLANADO, which is an initiative advancing strategic land use and urban planning.

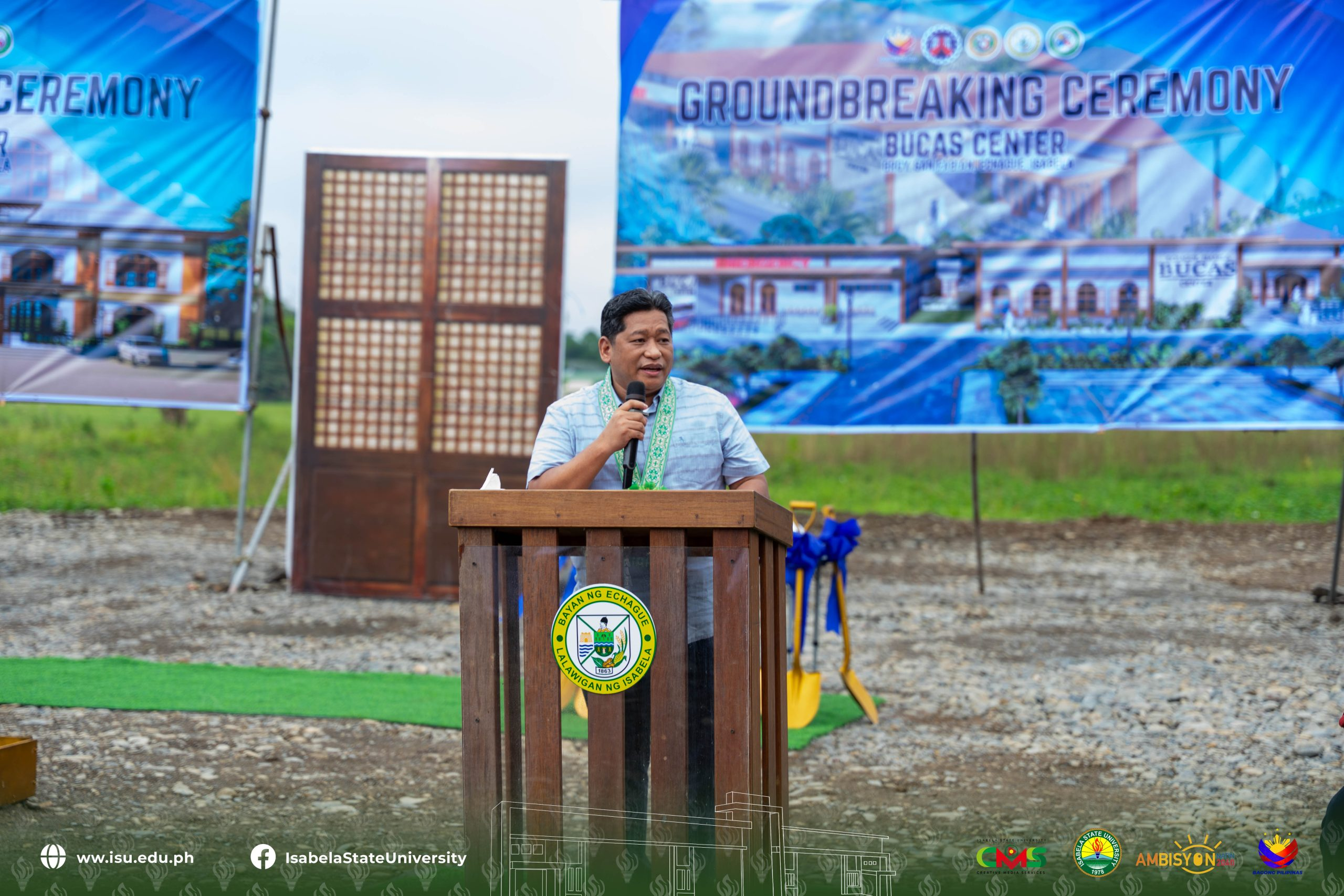
Escolango speaks at the BUCAS Center groundbreaking ceremony of the Southern Isabela Medical Center in 2025.

On August 1, 2025, Escolango was appointed by President Bongbong Marcos as Undersecretary of Department of Health (DOH). In this capacity, he serves as alternate of the Secretary of Health in the Philippine Health Insurance Corporation (PhilHealth) Board of Directors, and as member of the Board of Trustees of Specialty Hospitals in the Philippines.

Escolango also served senior positions in various organizations, including being Vice President of the Philippine Association of Government Corporate Lawyers, and President of the New Era University Alumni Association.
