= Bugang River =

River in Antique, Philippines

- Bugang River mouth Bugang River (Philippines)
- Native name: Suba kang Bugang (Kinaray-a)

Location
- Country: Philippines
- Region: Western Visayas
- Province: Antique
- Municipality: Pandan

Physical characteristics
- Source
  - location: Northwest Panay Peninsula Natural Park
  - elevation: 573 m (1,880 ft)
- Mouth
  - location: Pandan Bay, Mag-aba
  - coordinates: 11°44′24″N 122°03′50″E
  - elevation: 0 m (0 ft)
- Length: 10.3 km (6.4 mi)
- Basin size: 27.5 km^{2} (10.6 sq mi)

Basin features
- Bridges: Bugang Bridge

The Bugang River is a river situated in the northwest of Panay island in the Philippines. It is located in municipality of Pandan, Antique which is noted for its distinction as the "Cleanest Inland Body of Water" in the country.

== Topography ==
The Bugang River entirely traverses Pandan town of Antique province. It has a length of 6 kilometers (3.7 mi) Its headspring is 30 meters (98 ft) deep. The river originates from around the area of the Northwest Panay Peninsula Natural Park From upstream to Pandan Bay where it converges, the Bugang flows along the barangays Candari, Santo Rosario, Guia, Zaldivar and Mag-aba.

During the summer season, water levels of the river temporarily decreases.

== Fauna ==
Thirty-eight species of fish belonging to 30 genera and 20 families were recorded in a November 2013 to March 2014 survey of the Bugang River. Eleotridae is the most dominant family with six species while Gobiidae is the second most dominant with four species.

== Tourism ==
The river serves as a primary tourist destination of the town of Pandan, Antique. The Malumpati Cold Spring Resort, which is situated in the upper portions of the river near the headspring is the main tourist destination of Pandan town.

== Environmental conservation ==
Efforts to keep the river clean despite exploiting it for tourism has received recognition in both the national and international level. The river received a Hall of Fame award as part of the national government's Cleanest Inland Body of Water competition.

The United Kingdom-based The Green Organization recognized the Bugang Community-Based Eco-Tourism Organization (BCBTO) at the Green Environment Apple Awards in 2006 for their campaign to preserve the river. The BCBTO conducts information drives regarding the river's preservation as well as monthly cleanups of the river. The organization also campaigned for the prohibition of maintaining pigpens along the riverside and swimming at the river's headspring.

The 16th Congress of the Philippine Senate commended the local government and community of Pandan in a September 2014 resolution for their conservation efforts which made the river the "Cleanest Inland Body of Water" in the country and cited their case a successful model for community-based ecotourism.
