= Northwest Panay Peninsula Natural Park =

Protected area in the Philippines

- IUCN category III (natural monument or feature)
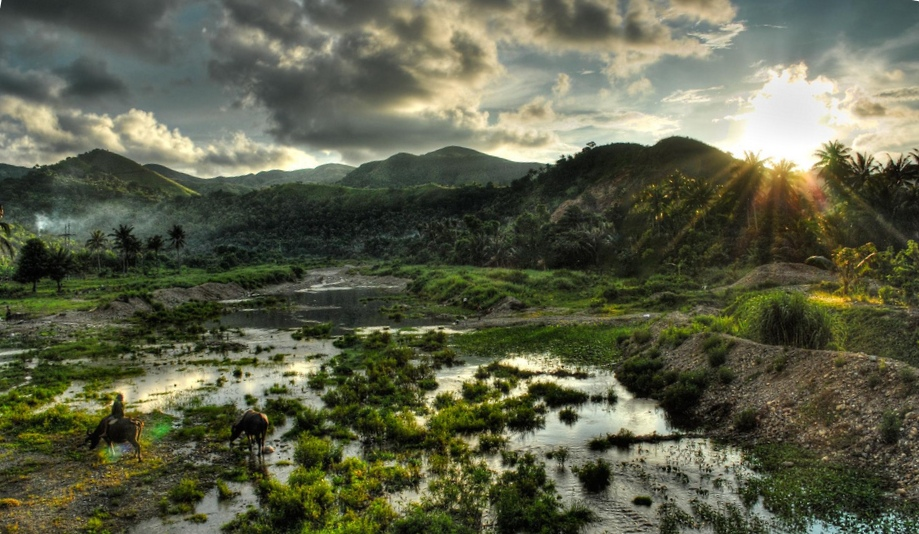
- Northwest Panay Peninsula Natural Park as seen from Unidos in Nabas

- Location within Philippines
- Location: Aklan and Antique, Philippines
- Nearest city: Roxas
- Coordinates: 11°49′25″N 121°59′55″E
- Area: 12,009.29 hectares (29,675.6 acres)
- Established: April 18, 2002
- Governing body: Department of Environment and Natural Resources

The Northwest Panay Peninsula Natural Park is located on the island of Panay, in the provinces of Aklan and Antique of the Philippines which was proclaimed a natural park by President Gloria Macapagal Arroyo on 18 April 2002 (Presidential Proclamation No. 186, 2002). The Northwest Panay Peninsula Natural Park has an area of 120.09 km^{2}, found within the municipalities of Nabas, Malay, Buruanga, Libertad and Pandan.

== Watershed area ==
The Northwest Panay Peninsula Natural Park is also an important watershed. The forest of the Natural Park channels the water from the rains into a system of springs and rivers that provide water for over 100,000 inhabitants. The water for Boracay Island and the hundreds of thousands of tourists that visit there every year is also provided by the Northwest Panay watershed.

== Protection activities ==
As this area is considered highly important, the Northwest Panay Biodiversity Management Council (NPBMC) was formed in 1999 to protect it. The NPBMC is made up of the local government units of Northwest Panay, Non-governmental organizations like BioCon, and National and Local Government Agencies like the Department of Environment and Natural Resources (DENR).

In March 2016, the German government has provided 4 million Euro (Php200-million) grant for a forest protection project.

== Flora and Fauna ==
The site is home to a wide range of flora and fauna of the Western Visayas.

Name	Description
Visayan Leopard Cat	A small wild cat native to continental South, Southeast and East Asia
Visayan Warty Pig	A critically endangered species in the pig genus
Visayan Spotted Deer	Also known as the Philippine spotted deer, is a nocturnal and endangered species of deer located primarily in the rainforests of the Visayan islands of Panay and Negros though it once roamed other islands such as Cebu, Guimaras, Leyte, Masbate, and Samar
Negros Bleeding-heart Dove	A species of pigeon endemic to the Philippines where it is found on the islands of Negros and Panay
Blue-naped Parrot	Also known as the blue-crowned green parrot, Luzon parrot, the Philippine green parrot, and locally known as pikoy, is a parrot found throughout the Philippines.
Visayan Hornbill	A hornbill found in rainforests on the islands of Panay, Negros, Masbate, and Guimaras, and formerly Ticao, in the Philippines.
Walden's Hornbill	Locally called dulungan, also known as the Visayan wrinkled hornbill, rufous-headed hornbill or writhed-billed hornbill, is a critically endangered species of hornbill living in the rainforests on the islands of Negros and Panay in the Philippines.
Panay Monitor	An endangered monitor lizard native to Panay Island in the Philippines. Unlike most monitors, it is a specialized frugivore.
Little Golden-mantled Flying Fox	A species of bat in the family Pteropodidae. It is found in Indonesia and the Philippines.

== Peaks ==
List of peaks in Northwest Panay Mountain Range by elevation.

- Mount Tinayunga 3,002 ft (915 m)
- Mount Guimbarogtog 2,497 ft (761 m)
- Mount Butong 2,493 ft (760 m)
- Mount Potol 2,326 ft (709 m)
- Mount Tungo 2,126 ft (648 m)
- Mount Guibulon 1,995 ft (608 m)
- Mount Banjao 1,975 ft (602 m)
- Mount Pinapoan 1,922 ft (586 m)
- Mount Duyong 1,640 ft (500 m)
- Mount Mab-o 1,558 ft (475 m)
- Mount Tinagtacan 1,365 ft (416 m)
- Mount Cumaingin 1,037 ft (316 m)
- Mount Malagud 827 ft (252 m)

== See also ==
- Sibalom Natural Park
- List of natural parks of the Philippines
- List of protected areas of the Philippines
- List of World Heritage Sites in the Philippines

== See also ==
- List of protected areas of the Philippines
