= Subic Bay Metropolitan Authority =

Economic development agency of the Philippines

- Kalakhang Pangasiwaan sa Look ng Subic
- Official Logo

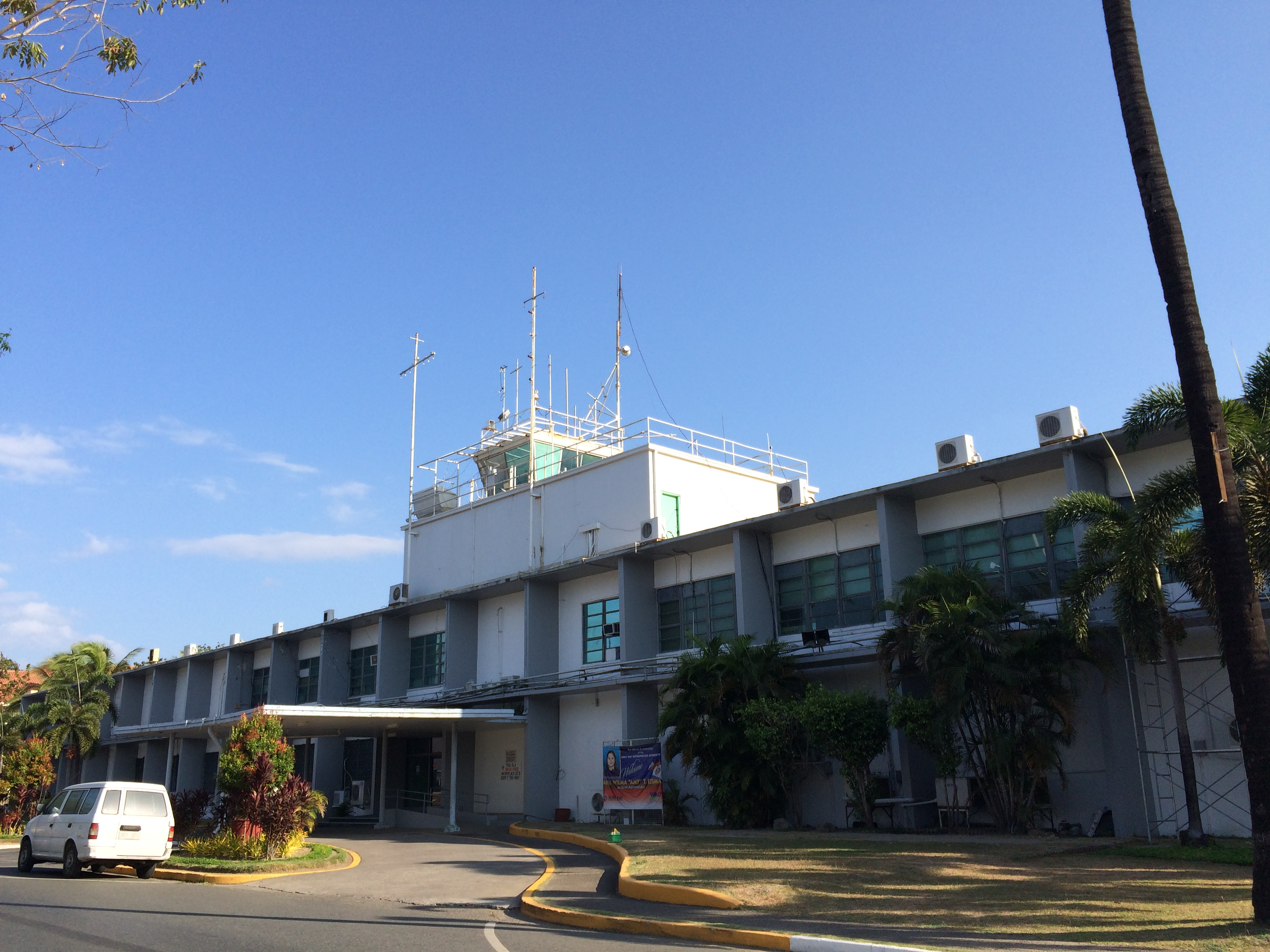
- Building 229 (Administration Building)

Agency overview
- Formed: March 13, 1992; 34 years ago
- Jurisdiction: The Whole Area of Subic Bay Freeport Zone (Formerly, Subic Naval Base), partial area of Redondo Peninsula (including, Subic Hanjin Shipyard), and the coastal boundary of Subic Bay
- Headquarters: Bldg. 229, Waterfront Road, Central Business District, Subic Bay Freeport Zone, Olongapo City; 14°49′02″N 120°16′50″E
- Agency executive: Eduardo L. Aliño, Chairman & Administrator
- Parent agency: Office of the President of the Philippines
- Website: Subic Bay Metropolitan Authority Official Website

The Subic Bay Metropolitan Authority (SBMA; Filipino: Pangasiwaang Panlungsod ng Subic Bay) is a governmental agency of the Philippines. The SBMA has played a significant part in the development of the Subic Special Economic and Freeport Zone into a self-sustainable area that promotes the industrial, commercial, investment, and financial areas of trade in the zone as well as in the Philippines itself.

The area of jurisdiction of the SBMA includes the erstwhile U.S. Naval Base Subic Bay, parts of Redondo peninsula where the Subic Hanjin shipyard is located, and erstwhile US defence accommodations in the hills consisting of Binictican and Kalayan housing areas.

The agency is currently headed by Eduardo L. Aliño as of January 22, 2024. His predecessor as Chairman and Administrator from 2023 to 2024 was former Pandan, Antique mayor Jonathan Tan.

== History ==
On March 13, 1992, the Philippine Congress passed Republic Act 7227, known as the Bases Conversion and Development Act of 1992, in anticipation of the pullout of the US military bases in the country. Section 13 of Republic Act No. 7227 created the Subic Bay Metropolitan Authority (SBMA) to develop and manage the Freeport which provides tax and duty-free privileges and incentives to business locators in the special economic zone.

Richard Gordon, then the mayor of the City of Olongapo, became the first SBMA chairman.

Mayor Gordon with 8,000 volunteers took over the facility to preserve and protect US$8 billion worth of property and facilities when the last U.S. Navy helicopter carrier USS Belleau Wood sailed out of Subic Bay on November 24, 1992. They started the conversion of the military base into a freeport like Hong Kong and Singapore.

On its fourth anniversary on November 24, 1996, Subic Bay hosted the leaders of 18 economies during the Fourth Asia- Pacific Economic Cooperation (APEC) Leaders' Summit. By that time, the emerging investment haven had already successfully attracted companies such as Federal Express, Enron, Coastal Petroleum (now part of Kinder Morgan), Taiwan computer giant Acer and France telecoms company Thomson SA to establish operations in the freeport.

=== Subic Bay Historical Center ===
The Authority opened a history center. It has an exhibit about hell ships, and other recoveries in Subic Bay's maritime history.

== List of SBMA Chairman and Administrators ==
Name	Term	Position
Richard J. Gordon	1992–1998	Chairman and Administrator
Felicito C. Payumo	1998–2004	Chairman and Administrator
Francisco H. Licuanan	2004–2006	Chairman/ Head of SBMA
Alfredo C. Antonio	2004–2006	Administrator/ Chief Executive Officer
Feliciano G. Salonga	2006–2011	Chairman/ Head of SBMA
Armand C. Arreza	2006–2011	Administrator/ Chief Executive Officer
Roberto V. Garcia	2011–2016	Chairman and Administrator
Martin B. Diño	2016–September 2017	Chairman/ Head of SBMA
Randy Escolango	October 2016–January 2017	OIC Administrator/ Chief Executive Officer
Wilma T. Eisma	January 2017–March 2022	Chairman and Administrator
Rolen C. Paulino Sr.	March 2022–April 2023	Chairman and Administrator
Jonathan D. Tan	April 2023–January 2024	Chairman and Administrator
Eduardo L. Aliño	January 2024–present	Chairman and Administrator
