= Armand Arreza =

Philippine civil servant

Hon. Armand C. Arreza

Administrator and chief executive officer of the Subic Bay Metropolitan Authority
- In office September 23, 2005 – September 19, 2011
- Preceded by: Alfredo C. Antonio
- Succeeded by: Roberto V. Garcia

Personal details
- Born: November 20, 1971 (age 54) Manila, Philippines
- Education: Ateneo de Manila University, Wharton School of the University of Pennsylvania

Armand dela Cruz Arreza (born November 20, 1971) was the 4th Administrator & Chief Executive Officer of the Subic Bay Metropolitan Authority (SBMA), a government-owned and –controlled corporation (GOCC) created in 1992, to manage and administer the Subic Bay Freeport. As of present, he was the youngest official to hold the title of Administrator.

== Biography and career ==
Armand Arreza was born on November 20, 1971, in Quezon City, Philippines, the eldest of the three children of Andres C. Arreza of Cantilan, Surigao del Sur and Priscilla C. Arreza of Manila. His siblings are Arnel C. Arreza and Pamela C. Arreza, and his offsprings are Lorenzo Gabriel, Beatriz Bianca, Andre, and Alyana Claire.

=== Education ===
He attended La Salle Green Hills (LSGH) for both his Elementary and Secondary Education, and graduated in 1985 and 1989, respectively. He earned his Bachelor of Science in Management Engineering at the Ateneo de Manila University in 1993. He received his Masters of Business Administration, majoring in Finance and Operations, at the Wharton School of the University of Pennsylvania in Philadelphia, Pennsylvania, in 1998.

At Wharton School, Arreza became a trustee of the Wharton-Penn Club Foundation, which was organized to provide social outreach activities to the Filipino community.

His early passion for socio-civic work later led him to become the chairman for the Youth Committee of the Rotary Club of Makati, Dasmariñas, Philippines.

=== Private sector and socio-civic work ===
Arreza began his career in the private sector as a senior consultant for the Hong Kong branch of the Monitor Company, a multinational strategy consultancy firm.

From 2000 to 2002, he was the chief operating officer of Globalstride Customer Services. He then became the operations director of the American International Group (AIG) Business Processing services, Inc. in 2005.

A year later, Arreza found another outlet for his socio-civic bent as a member of the Philippine National Red Cross. At the International Red Cross Red Crescent Conference in Geneva, he was elected to the prestigious Finance Commission of the International Federation of Red Cross (IFRC), making him part of the nine-man commission, all of whom come from different countries.

=== Political career ===
His initiation into the ranks of the Subic Bay Metropolitan Authority began way back in 1993. Fresh from college, he became one of the first SBMA employees, and notably served as a Financial Analyst for the government-owned and -controlled corporation (GOCC)'s privatization of infrastructure assets. From there, he returned to the private sector for a couple of years, working with various multinational companies.

==== Department of Tourism ====
In 2003, he returned to government service as the Undersecretary of the Department of Tourism (DOT). With his assistance, the department headed WOW Philippines Intramuros, a multi-agency initiative for revitalizing Manila's historic district, which became one of the most visited tourist spots in the country.

==== Subic Bay Metropolitan Authority ====
In September 2005, then Philippine president Gloria Macapagal Arroyo appointed Arreza as the administrator and chief executive officer of the Government-Owned & Controlled Corporation. He stepped down on September 19, 2011.

On his first year as SBMA administrator and CEO, the Subic Bay Freeport Zone (SBFZ) successfully served as the venue of four (4) events of the 23rd South East Asia Games - namely archery, triathlon, canoe/kayak and sailing.

The following year, the Freeport topped the list of Philippine investment promotion agencies (IPAs) and was declared as a major component of the Metro Luzon Beltway, a super-region that was envisioned to become a globally competitive urban, industrial, and service center. That same year, Arreza also succeeded in wooing Korean giant Hanjin Heavy Industries and Construction Company-Phil (HHIC-Phil) to invest US$1.0 billion for the development and construction of the world's second largest shipyard at the Redondo Peninsula, Subic Bay Freeport Zone.

He spent the rest of his term at the Subic Bay Metropolitan Authority, firming up the Freeport’s position in the region's containerized transport industry and as one of the country’s tourism, sports, and MICE (Meetings, Incentives, Conventions and Exhibits) destinations.

Highlighting Arreza’s government career and underscoring his strong socio-civic spirit was the first-ever distribution of Certificates of Ancestral Domain Titles to the indigenous peoples (IPs) in the Subic Bay Freeport Zone, which secured the IPs’ rights to their ancestral lands. To safeguard and promote the IPs’ welfare and human rights, Arreza initiated the drafting and inking of a joint management agreement, which he signed in 2011, together with the National Commission on Indigenous Peoples (NCIP) and the Indigenous Cultural Community of Aeta. The JMA further upheld and recognized the rights of the minority tribes within the Freeport in pursuing economic, cultural, and social development based on the Indigenous Peoples' Rights Act (IPRA) of 1997.

==== Post-government pursuits ====
At present, Arreza is a trustee of the Jesus Caring Educational Foundation. The institution is primarily dedicated to providing basic education and facilitating access to knowledge and learning based on Christian values to the less fortunate sectors of the society. It has facilities for an elementary school and a high school division in Pandi, Bulacan, Philippines.
