= Malasakit Center =

Philippine government one-stop-shops for medical assistance

Malasakit Centers
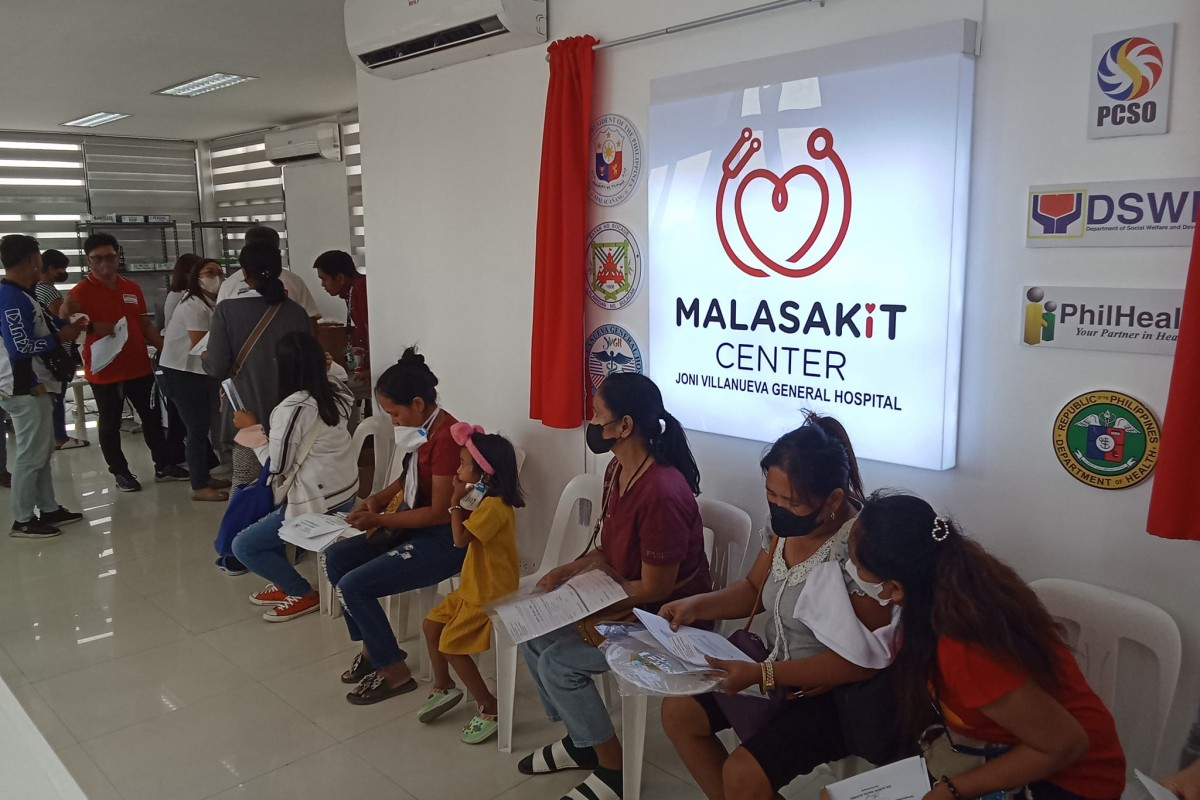
- People lining up for services at a Malasakit Center at the Joni Villanueva General Hospital in Bocaue
- Formation: February 2018; 8 years ago
- Founder: Bong Go
- Region served: Philippines
- Services: Government medical assistance subsidy processing
- Director: Varies by branch

The Malasakit Center refers to a chain of one-stop-shop centers for medical and financial assistance provided by various agencies of the Philippine government.

== Background ==
The Malasakit Center program was started by the Office of the Special Assistant to the President, led by Bong Go following a directive of President Rodrigo Duterte. The center is meant as a one-stop shop for government medical assistance for indigent Filipinos. The first Malasakit Center opened in February 2018.

When Go was elected Senator in 2019, he continued to promote the Malasakit Center; authoring a bill in the Senate that would institutionalize the center.

Go authored Senate Bill No. 1076 which was filed on September 26, 2019. While House of Representatives member Angelina Tan of Quezon wrote the counterpart bill, House Bill No. 5477 and filed it on December 3, 2019.

President Duterte signed into law on December 3, 2019, the Malasakit Center Act, also known as Republic Act No. 11463. As per law, the government is obliged to establish Malasakit Centers in all hospitals under the Department of Health and the Philippine General Hospital. The legislation also authorizes the Philippine National Police to set up of such facilities.

== Services ==
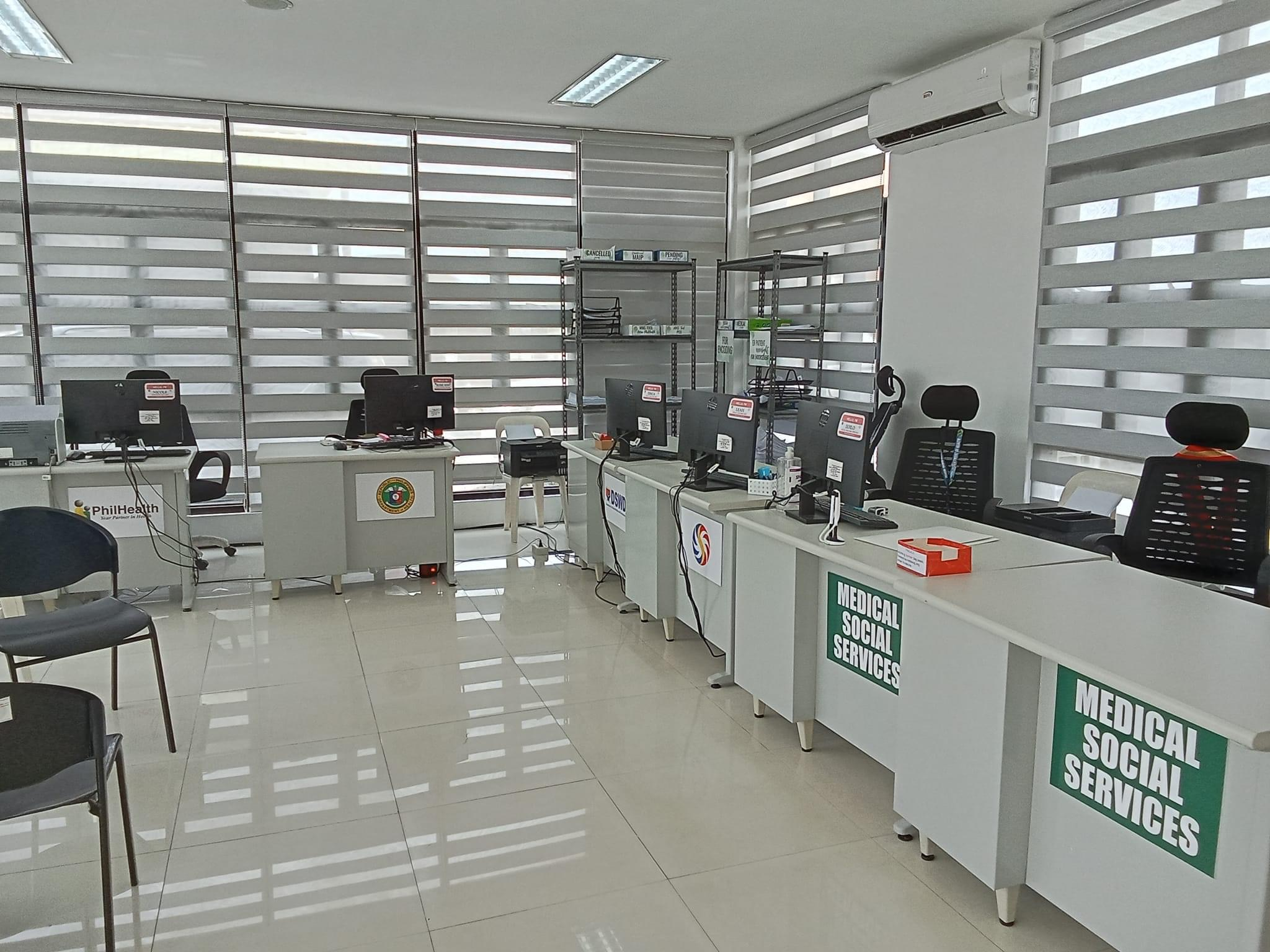
Interior of a Malasakit Center

Eligible indigent Filipinos can avail multiple subsidies from various government agencies in Malasakit Centers. Prior to the establishment of Malasakit Centers, indigents had to fill up multiple documents and go to separate government offices to lessen their medical expenses.

The Malasakit Center processes the availing of subsidies from the following government agencies:

- Department of Health
- Department of Social Welfare and Development
- PhilHealth
- Philippine Charity Sweepstakes Office
- Philippine Amusement and Gaming Corporation

== Branches ==
As of May 2025, there are 167 Malasakit Centers across the Philippines, with 93 in Luzon, 30 in the Visayas and 44 in Mindanao.

== See also ==
- BUCAS center
