= 2016 Olongapo local elections =

Philippine election

2016 Olongapo mayoral election
- May 9, 2016
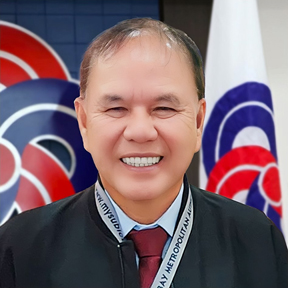

Nominee	Rolen Paulino	James Gordon Jr.	Octavio Galvezo
Party	Liberal	Bagumbayan	Independent
Running mate	Jong Cortez	Rodel Cerezo
Popular vote	66,815	20,002	549
Percentage	76.48%	22.89%	0.63%
Mayor before election
Rolen Paulino
Liberal
Elected mayor
Rolen Paulino
Liberal

Local elections were held in Olongapo City on May 9, 2016, within the Philippine general election. The voters elected candidates for the elective local posts in the city: the mayor, vice mayor, and ten councilors.

== Mayoralty Election ==
Incumbent Mayor Rolen Paulino was running for reelection as Mayor under the Liberal Party, his running mate was Councilor Jong Cortez.

His opponent were former Mayor James L. Gordon Jr., set to make a political comeback after 3 years, and his running under the Bagumbayan-VNP and the incumbent Vice Mayor Rodel Cerezo, and Independent mayoral candidate Octavio Galvezo.

== Candidates ==
=== Mayor ===
Olongapo City Mayoralty Election
Party	Candidate	Votes	%
Liberal	Rolen Paulino	66,815	76.48%
Bagumbayan	James "Bong" Gordon Jr.	20,002	22.89%
Independent	Octavio Galvezo	549	0.63%
Total votes		87,366	100.00%

=== Vice Mayor ===
Olongapo City Vice Mayoralty Election
Party	Candidate	Votes	%
Liberal	Jong Cortez	47,704	57.73%
Bagumbayan	Rodel Cerezo	34,932	42.27%
Total votes		82,636	100.00%

=== Councilors ===
==== Team Paulino ====
Liberal Party/Team Paulino
Name	Party
Noel Atienza	Liberal
Linus Bacay	Liberal
BJ Cajudo	Liberal
Edna Elane	Liberal
Ed Guerrero	Liberal
Lugie Lipumano	Liberal
Erma Manalang	Liberal
Winnie Ortiz	Liberal
Bas Palo	Liberal

==== Straight Gordon Ticket ====
Bagumbayan-VNP/Straight Gordon Ticket
Name	Party
Zar Batapa	Bagumbayan
Genia Eclarino	Bagumbayan
Eyrma Marzan-Estrella	Bagumbayan
Ferdie Magrata	Bagumbayan
Jimmy Mendoza	Bagumbayan
Cornelio Niro	Bagumbayan
Gina Perez	Bagumbayan
Ed Piano	Bagumbayan
Mike Pusing	Bagumbayan
Ronald Villegas	Bagumbayan

Olongapo City Council Election
Party	Candidate	Votes	%
Liberal	Lugie Lipumano	51,763	
Liberal	BJ Cajudo	47,135	
Liberal	Noel Atienza	45,235	
Liberal	Ed Guerrero	42,557	
Liberal	Winnie Ortiz	42,525	
Liberal	Edna Edlane	40,878	
Liberal	Linus Bacay	33,756	
Bagumbayan	Ed Piano	30,271	
Liberal	Basilio Palo	29,803	
Aksyon	Jerome Michael Bacay	29,471	
Liberal	Erma Manalang	29,096	
Bagumbayan	Zar Batapa	27,770	
Bagumbayan	Eyrma Marzan-Estrella	26,644	
Bagumbayan	Gina Perez	26,118	
Independent	Kaye Legaspi	19,707	
Aksyon	Joe Madria	19,526	
Bagumbayan	Mike Pusing	16,757	
UNA	Filipina Tablan	15,758	
Bagumbayan	Ferdie Magrata	13,990	
Independent	Jojo Perez	12,000	
Bagumbayan	Ronald Villegas	10,833	
Bagumbayan	Genia Eclarino	10,671	
Independent	Edwin De Guzman	10,361	
Aksyon	Michael Alop	10,084	
Independent	Valiente De Leon	8,778	
Bagumbayan	Cornelio Niro	8,352	
Independent	Dante Hondo	8,277	
Bagumbayan	Jimmy Mendoza	7,827	
Independent	Mike Fanugao	6,822	
Independent	Roberto Buenafe	6,239	
Independent	Charles Burns Jr.	4,652	
Independent	Ricky Basañez	4,170	
Independent	Brenda Peralta	3,356	
Independent	Mondy Gutierrez	2,910	
Independent	Sevando Cesar Reyes	2,761	
Independent	Michael Talapiero	1,526	
Independent	Fernandito Lañada	1,161	
Total votes		709,540	100.00%
