= BUCAS Center =

Health program in the Philippines

- Bagong Urgent Care and Ambulatory Service
- Formation: March 6, 2024; 2 years ago
- Founder: Department of Health
- Founded at: Santo Tomas, Pampanga (first outlet)
- Region served: Philippines
- Services: Laboratory tests and medical procedures

The Bagong Urgent Care and Ambulatory Service (BUCAS) is a program by the Department of Health of the Philippines. The DOH manages BUCAS centers in the Philippines which provides free outpatient and urgent care services to indigents.

== History ==
The Bagong Urgent Care and Ambulatory Service (BUCAS) program was conceptualized in 2024 by the Department of Health (DOH) under secretary Ted Herbosa. First Lady Liza Araneta Marcos's Lab For All project was cited as an inspiration for the program which sought increasing the access of urgent care and ambulatory services to the indigent population. The planning took three months.

The first BUCAS Center opened at the Jose B. Lingad Memorial General Hospital (JBLMGH) in Santo Tomas, Pampanga on March 6, 2024.

The initial target was to set up 28 BUCAS centers across the Philippines by 2028. However by May 10, 2025, 51 centers have been opened.

== Services ==
The BUCAS centers are meant to service the indigent population with free laboratory tests and other select medical procedures. It also provides specialized care for senior citizens.

This is similar to the Super Health Centers which are managed by local government units. BUCAS centers on the other hand are under the DOH and serves as extensions of its hospitals.

== See also ==
- Malasakit Center
