= Libertad, Antique =

Municipality in Antique, Philippines

Libertad
- Municipality
- Municipality of Libertad
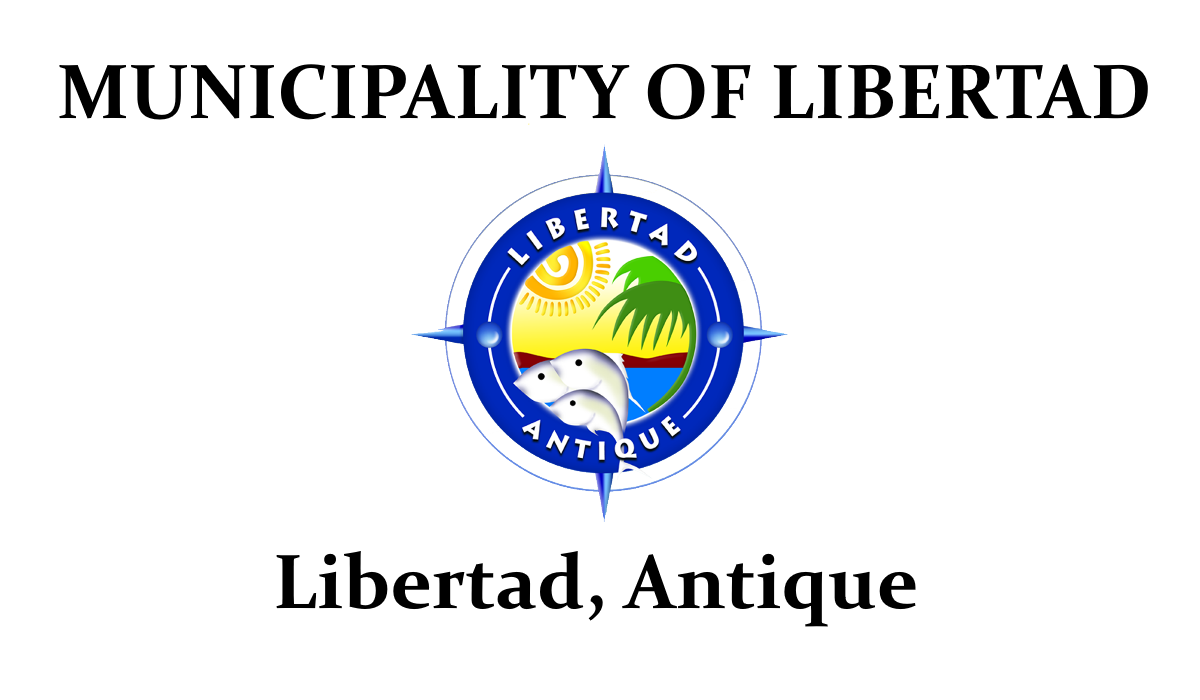
- Flag
- Interactive map of Libertad
- Location within the Philippines
- Coordinates: 11°46′08″N 121°55′08″E
- Country: Philippines
- Region: Western Visayas
- Province: Antique
- District: Lone district
- Founded: 1949
- Barangays: 19 (see Barangays)

Government
  - Type: Sangguniang Bayan
  - Mayor: Mary Jean N. Te
  - Vice Mayor: Jeolito D. Mateo
  - Representative: Loren Legarda
  - Municipal Council: Members: Gio S. Ebon; Menard D. Tandug; Henry L. Domingo; Josephine C. Ysulat; Marte C. Ambubuyog; Eustaquio S. Daypuyart; Edgar P. Jimenez; Gualterio R. Rufon III
  - Electorate: 11,617 voters (2025)

Area
  - Total: 97.00 km^{2} (37.45 sq mi)
- Elevation: 46 m (151 ft)
- Highest elevation (Mount Tinayunga): 915 m (3,002 ft)
- Lowest elevation: 0 m (0 ft)

Population (2024 census)
  - Total: 18,685
  - Density: 192.6/km^{2} (498.9/sq mi)
  - Households: 4,510

Economy
  - Income class: 4th municipal income class
  - Poverty incidence: 19.02% (2023)
  - Revenue: ₱ 124.3 million (2024)
  - Assets: ₱ 350.7 million (2024)
  - Expenditure: ₱ 125.9 million (2024)
  - Liabilities: ₱ 235.2 million (2024)

Service provider
  - Electricity: Aklan Electric Cooperative (AKELCO)
- Time zone: UTC+8 (PST)
- ZIP code: 5710
- PSGC: 060610000
- IDD : area code: +63 (0)36
- Native languages: Karay-a; Hiligaynon; Tagalog

Libertad, officially the Municipality of Libertad, (Kinaray-a: Banwa kang Libertad; Hiligaynon: Banwa sang Libertad; Aklanon: Banwa it Libertad; Tagalog: Bayan ng Libertad), is a municipality in the province of Antique, Philippines. According to the 2024 census, it has a population of 18,685 people.

== History ==
Libertad was established by virtue of Executive Order No. 253, promulgated on August 5, 1949, with its territory obtained from a portion of the preexisting Pandan municipality.

== Geography ==
Libertad is the northernmost municipality of the province. It is 150 kilometres (93 mi) from the provincial capital, San Jose de Buenavista, and 78 kilometres (48 mi) from Kalibo, the capital of Aklan.

According to the Philippine Statistics Authority, the municipality has a land area of 97.00 square kilometres (37.45 sq mi) constituting 3.55% of the 2,729.17-square-kilometre- (1,053.74 sq mi) total area of Antique.

=== Barangays ===
Libertad is administratively subdivided into 19 barangays. Each barangay consists of puroks and some have sitios.

PSGC	Barangay	Population			±% p.a.	
		2024		2010		
060610001	Barusbus	6.8%	1,270	1,069	▴	1.20%
060610002	Bulanao	2.1%	384	454	▾	−1.16%
060610013	Centro Este (Poblacion)	5.9%	1,094	1,080	▴	0.09%
060610014	Centro Weste (Poblacion)	6.0%	1,120	1,104	▴	0.10%
060610004	Codiong	2.8%	517	475	▴	0.59%
060610003	Cubay	5.5%	1,037	968	▴	0.48%
060610005	Igcagay	2.9%	550	625	▾	−0.88%
060610006	Inyawan	2.4%	454	433	▴	0.33%
060610007	Lindero	3.3%	608	542	▴	0.80%
060610008	Maramig	1.7%	321	315	▴	0.13%
060610010	Pajo	3.5%	648	576	▴	0.82%
060610011	Panangkilon	2.7%	505	419	▴	1.30%
060610012	Paz	3.6%	681	675	▴	0.06%
060610009	Pucio	3.5%	661	574	▴	0.98%
060610015	San Roque	5.8%	1,076	1,089	▾	−0.08%
060610018	Taboc	6.8%	1,273	1,263	▴	0.05%
060610016	Tinigbas	6.0%	1,120	1,027	▴	0.60%
060610017	Tinindugan	2.0%	371	381	▾	−0.18%
060610019	Union	14.7%	2,739	2,600	▴	0.36%
	Total		18,685	15,669	▴	1.23%

=== Climate ===
Climate data for Libertad, Antique
Month	Jan	Feb	Mar	Apr	May	Jun	Jul	Aug	Sep	Oct	Nov	Dec	Year
Mean daily maximum °C (°F)	28 (82)	29 (84)	30 (86)	32 (90)	32 (90)	31 (88)	30 (86)	30 (86)	29 (84)	29 (84)	29 (84)	28 (82)	30 (86)
Mean daily minimum °C (°F)	23 (73)	22 (72)	23 (73)	24 (75)	25 (77)	25 (77)	25 (77)	24 (75)	24 (75)	24 (75)	24 (75)	23 (73)	24 (75)
Average precipitation mm (inches)	47 (1.9)	33 (1.3)	39 (1.5)	48 (1.9)	98 (3.9)	150 (5.9)	169 (6.7)	147 (5.8)	163 (6.4)	172 (6.8)	118 (4.6)	80 (3.1)	1,264 (49.8)
Average rainy days	11.4	8.2	9.3	9.7	19.1	25.6	27.4	25.5	25.5	25.2	18.5	14.5	219.9
Source: Meteoblue (modeled/calculated data, not measured locally)

== Demographics ==
Population census of Libertad
Year	Pop.	±% p.a.
1960	7,568	—
1970	8,945	+1.68%
1975	9,176	+0.51%
1980	9,870	+1.47%
1990	11,049	+1.13%
1995	13,274	+3.50%
2000	12,955	−0.52%
2007	14,653	+1.71%
2010	15,669	+2.47%
2015	16,429	+0.91%
2020	17,507	+1.35%
2024	18,685	+1.58%
Source: Philippine Statistics Authority

In the 2024 census, Libertad had a population of 18,685 people. The population density was 190 inhabitants per square kilometre (490/sq mi).

=== Languages ===
Kinaray-a is the main dialect of Libertad. Aklanon is also used due to Libertad’s proximity to Aklan. Hiligaynon is widely spoken and understood in the municipality.

== Economy ==
Poverty incidence of Libertad (%)

Source: Philippine Statistics Authority

== Education ==
The Libertad Schools District Office governs all educational institutions within the municipality. It oversees the management and operations of all private and public, from primary to secondary schools.

=== Primary and elementary schools ===
- Alejo S. Dionela Primary School
- Bulanao Elementary School
- Codiong Primary School
- Dr. Arturo U. Laggui and Moises A. Depuno Sr. Memorial School
- Igcagay Primary School
- Libertad Central School
- Lindero Elementary School
- Paz Elementary School
- Pedro C. Rufon Sr. Memorial Primary School
- Pucio Elementary School
- San Juan Primary School
- San Roque Elementary School
- Taboc Elementary School
- Tinigbas Elementary School
- Tinindugan Primary School
- Union Elementary School

=== Secondary schools ===
- Libertad National Vocational School
- Union National High School
