= Jonathan Tan (politician) =

Filipino politician (born 1976)

The Honorable Jonathan Dioso Tan

Undersecretary of the Department of the Interior and Local Government
- In office January 12, 2024 – October 2024

Chairman and Administrator of the Subic Bay Metropolitan Authority
- In office April 28, 2023 – January 12, 2024
- President: Bongbong Marcos
- Preceded by: Rolen C. Paulino Sr.
- Succeeded by: Eduardo Aliño

Mayor of Pandan, Antique
- In office June 30, 2010 – June 30, 2019
- Vice Mayor: Louie Lomugdang (2010–2016); Dr. Renato Tugon (2016–2019)
- Preceded by: Plaridel Sanchez VI
- Succeeded by: Plaridel Sanchez VI

Personal details
- Born: Jonathan Dioso Tan; August 12, 1976 (age 50) Manila, Philippines
- Party: Independent (2024–present)
- Other political affiliations: Nacionalista (2018–2024); Liberal (2009–2018)
- Education: Ateneo de Manila University (MPM); University of Santo Tomas (BSIE)
- Occupation: politician, businessman

Jonathan Dioso Tan is a Filipino politician and businessman who served as mayor of Pandan, Antique from 2010 to 2019. He was appointed on April 28, 2023 as the Chairman and Administrator of the Subic Bay Metropolitan Authority (SBMA). As SBMA Chairman and Administrator, he accomplished a major milestone to bolster the national coffers as SBMA ranked as one of the top dividend contributors in 2023. On January 12, 2024, Malacañang announced the promotion to national level of Tan as Undersecretary of Department of the Interior and Local Government (DILG).

He was one of the Philippines' Most Outstanding Mayors in 2012 together with city Mayors Alfredo Lim of Manila, Benjie Lim of Dagupan, Meynardo Sabili of Lipa, Edgardo Pamintuan of Angeles, Jennifer Austria-Barzaga of Dasmariñas, and Len Alonte-Naguiat of Biñan. He was the only municipal mayor who bagged the award on that year.

He served as President of the League of Municipalities of the Philippines – Antique and elected as PRO of LMP-National from 2013 to 2016. He was also the Secretary of the Northwest Panay Peninsula Biodiversity and Conservation Council.

== Accomplishments ==
One of his major accomplishments was making Pandan a recipient of Pantawid Pamilyang Pilipino Program or 4Ps, an anti-poverty project of DSWD. Mayor Tan's initiative to source out funds from Senators paved the way for more development projects in the municipality. His trademark, JDT, aside from it as an abbreviation of his name, stands for Jobs, Development and Tourism. He managed to enhance the tourism industry in the town as Pandan was included in the 77 Tourism Development areas identified by DOT. It benefited not just the town itself, but also other Eco-tourism destinations in Northern Antique.

== Speedboat incident ==
On March 29, 2018, during the culmination of Semana Santa (Holy Week), a speedboat capsized near the coastal waters of Sebaste, a neighboring town of Pandan. According to reports from the Philippine Coast Guard, Tan was with two other people, when the boat capsized around five kilometers away from the coast of Sebaste. They were rescued after four hours at sea. Tan and his companion swam to the shoreline for half an hour and reached it 1:45 p.m.

Among the others rescued were actresses Bianca Manalo and Ehra Madrigal, as well as Madrigal’s husband. One other occupant died due to stroke and drowning.

== Controversy ==
On April 4, 2025, a complaint was filed before the Quezon City Prosecutor’s Office against Tan for violation of paragraphs (a), (d), (e)(2), (g), and (i), Section 5 of the Anti-Violence Against Women and Their Children Act. The identity of the complainant was withheld.
