= Rolen Paulino =

Filipino politician

The Honorable Rolen Paulino Sr.
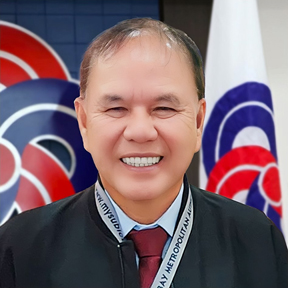
- Official portrait, 2023

Mayor of Olongapo City
- In office June 30, 2013 – June 30, 2019
- Vice Mayor: Rodel Cerezo (2013–2016); Jong Cortez (2016–2019)
- Preceded by: James Gordon Jr.
- Succeeded by: Rolen Paulino Jr.

Vice Mayor of Olongapo
- In office June 30, 2010 – June 30, 2013
- Mayor: James Gordon Jr.
- Preceded by: Cynthia Cajudo
- Succeeded by: Rodel Cerezo

Administrator and Chief Executive Officer of the Subic Bay Metropolitan Authority
- In office March 1, 2022 – April 15, 2023
- President: Rodrigo Duterte; Bongbong Marcos
- Preceded by: Wilma T. Eisma
- Succeeded by: Jonathan D. Tan

Personal details
- Born: Rolen Calixto Paulino Sr. November 24, 1962 (age 63) Angeles, Pampanga, Philippines
- Party: Independent (2019–present)
- Other political affiliations: Liberal (2015–2019); NPC (2009–2015)
- Spouse: Cynthia Tolibas Co (m. 1985)
- Children: 5 including Rolen C. Paulino Jr. Cristabelle Marie "Tata" C. Paulino, Drystan Sison

Rolen Calixto Paulino Sr. (born November 24, 1962) is a Filipino politician who was the mayor of Olongapo City from 2013 to 2019 and head of the Subic Bay Metropolitan Authority from 2022 to 2023. He is currently a member of the board of directors of the Bases Conversion and Development Authority since April 2023.

== Political career ==
Paulino ran for mayor of Olongapo in 2007, but was defeated by James "Bong" Gordon Jr.

=== Vice Mayor of Olongapo (2010-2013) ===
In 2010, he ran for vice mayor of Olongapo and won after garnering 47,074 against Gordon's running mate, Cynthia Cajudo, who garnered 31,121. He was sworn in on June 30, 2010.

=== Mayor of Olongapo (2013-2019) ===
He ran again for mayor of Olongapo in 2013. His opponents were Anne Gordon, wife of the incumbent mayor James "Bong" Gordon Jr., who was term-limited, and Bugsy delos Reyes, Gordon's nephew. He won the election, ending the Gordon political dynasty in the city. In the 2016 elections, Paulino won re-election against opponents James "Bong" Gordon Jr. and independent candidate Octavio Galvezo.

On June 28, 2013, he was inaugurated at Rizal Triangle in Olongapo. On June 30, his term officially started. On July 2, he and his team met Department of Energy Secretary Jericho Petilla and Private Sector Asset Liabilities Management (PSALM) President Emmanuel Ledesma Jr. regarding the ₱5.08 billion power debt. They agreed to cancel the power disconnection, and PSALM would restructure the payment scheme. Therefore, Paulino averted his city's power disconnection.

In September 2018, an investigation into alleged bidding anomalies led to the suspension of Paulino, along with the vice mayor and other key city officials, by the Ombudsman. The focus of the allegations was their purported involvement in disadvantageous lease contracts between the city government and SM Prime Holdings for the Olongapo City Civic Center spanning 2014 to 2015. Councilor Lugie Lipumano Garcia assumed the role of acting mayor during this suspension period, which lasted until March 2019.

In April 2019, an arrest order was issued by the Sandiganbayan against Paulino, vice-mayor Aquilino Cortez Jr., and some city councilors in connection with the alleged violations. Subsequently, in July 2019, the charges were dismissed after Paulino and his co-accused demonstrated that the Build-Operate-Transfer (BOT) Law did not apply to the lease agreements. The Sandiganbayan Seventh Division later affirmed its decision to acquit him and his co-accused of graft charges.

Despite the initial dismissal, the case was revived, leading to another arrest warrant issued by the Sandiganbayan Fifth Division in July 2022. However, on October 24, 2022, the case was ultimately dismissed when the court determined that the right to a speedy trial of Paulino and his co-accused had been violated.

=== Post-mayoral career ===
On March 1, 2022, after his political stint as mayor of Olongapo, Paulino was appointed by President Rodrigo Duterte as administrator and chairman of the board of directors of the Subic Bay Metropolitan Authority, replacing Wilma T. Eisma who resigned. He served until his resignation became effective on April 15, 2023.

On April 25, 2023, President Bongbong Marcos appointed him as member of the board of directors of the Bases Conversion and Development Authority, replacing Glorioso Miranda.

== Personal life ==
Paulino is married to Cynthia Tolibas Co, who has served on the board of directors of the Subic Bay Metropolitan Authority since 2014. They have five children with two actively engaged in Olongapo local politics, Rolen Paulino Jr., presently holding the position of mayor, and Cristabelle Marie "Tata" Paulino, serving as a city councilor.

In April 2021, Paulino was elected as the Grand Master of the Most Worshipful Grand Lodge of Free and Accepted Masons of the Philippines. He is also the potentate of Mabuhay Shriners, a local temple of Shriners International in the Philippines. He is a sports enthusiast with interests in racing, chess, tennis and golf.
