= Pandan, Antique =

Municipality in the Philippines

Pandan
- Municipality
- Municipality of Pandan
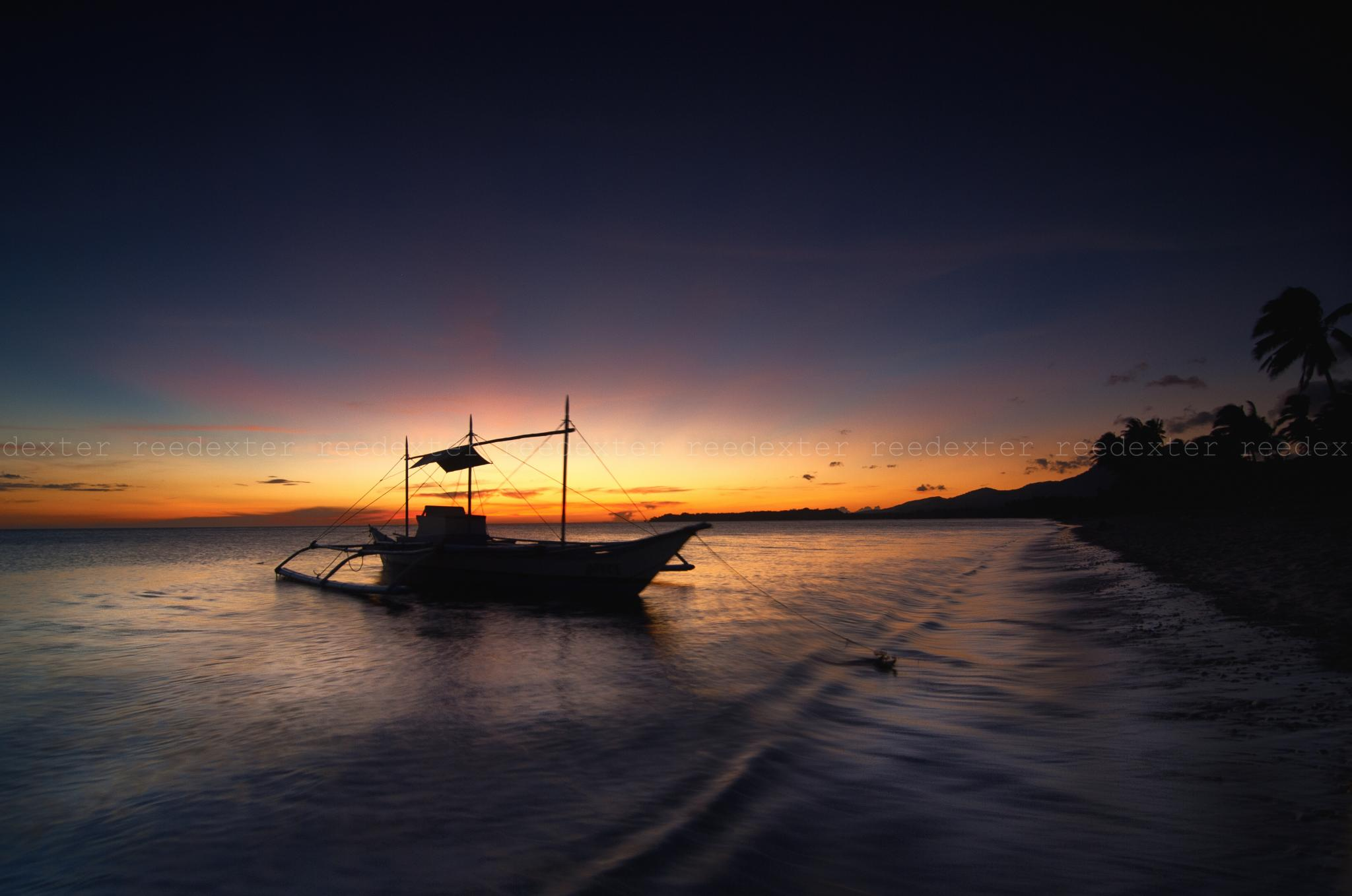
- Sunset in Pandan

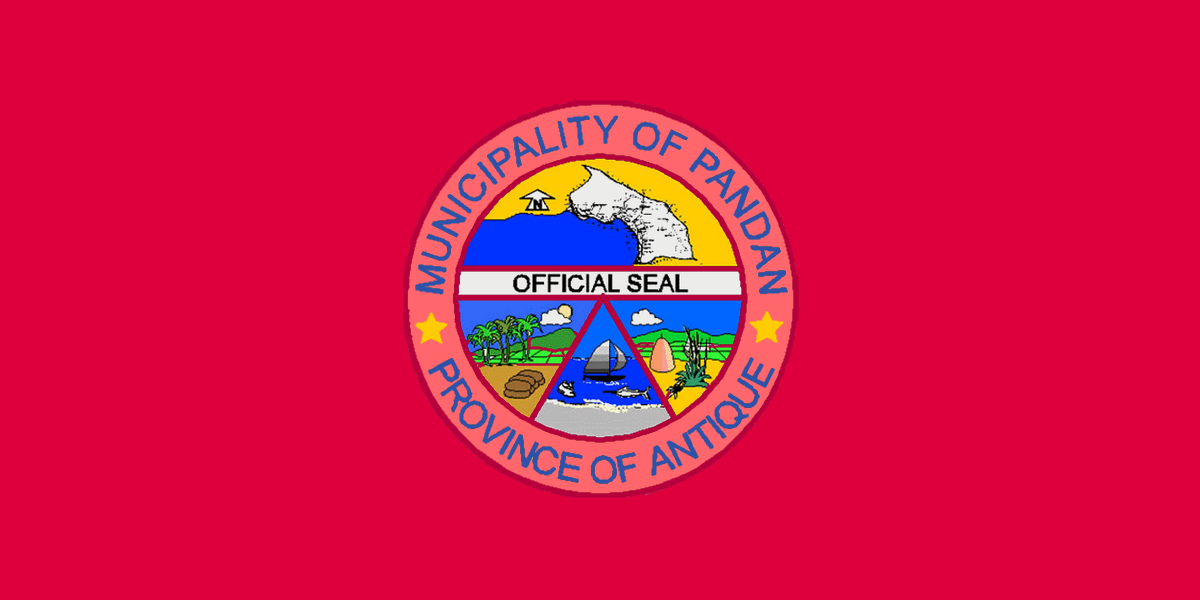
- Flag

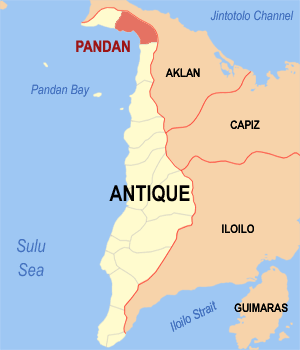
- Map of Antique with Pandan highlighted
- Interactive map of Pandan
- Location within Philippines
- Coordinates: 11°43′14″N 122°05′46″E
- Country: Philippines
- Region: Western Visayas
- Province: Antique
- District: Lone district
- Barangays: 34 (see Barangays)

Government
  - Type: Sangguniang Bayan
  - Mayor: Tomas Unlayao Estoperez Jr.
  - Vice Mayor: Plaridel John Sanchez VI
  - Representative: Antonio Agapito Legarda Jr.
  - Municipal Council: 1. Joemilia Tugon; 2. Ferdinand Alorro; 3. Patria Candari; 4. Plaridel Sanchez V 5. Henry Bogoy; 6. Marissa Napat; 7. Gaynor Briones; 8. Neopito Varon
  - Electorate: 25,346 voters (2025)

Area
  - Total: 113.98 km^{2} (44.01 sq mi)
- Elevation: 128 m (420 ft)
- Highest elevation: 810 m (2,660 ft)
- Lowest elevation: 0 m (0 ft)

Population (2024 census)
  - Total: 37,325
  - Density: 327.47/km^{2} (848.14/sq mi)
  - Households: 8,949
- Demonym: Pandananon

Economy
  - Income class: 2nd municipal income class
  - Poverty incidence: 10.75% (2023)
  - Revenue: ₱ 183.6 million (2024)
  - Assets: ₱ 497 million (2024)
  - Expenditure: ₱ 72.93 million (2024)
  - Liabilities: ₱ 193 million (2024)

Service provider
  - Electricity: Aklan Electric Cooperative (AKELCO)
- Time zone: UTC+8 (PST)
- ZIP code: 5712
- PSGC: 060611000
- IDD : area code: +63 (0)36
- Native languages: Karay-a; Hiligaynon; Tagalog
- Major religions: Roman Catholic, Iglesia Filipina Independiente, Iglesia ni Cristo
- Feast date: April 5 & 25
- Patron saint: St. Vincent Ferrer
- Website: www.pandan.gov.ph

Pandan, officially the Municipality of Pandan (Kinaray-a: Banwa kang Pandan; Hiligaynon: Banwa sang Pandan; Aklanon: Banwa it Pandan; Tagalog: Bayan ng Pandan), is a municipality in the province of Antique, Philippines. According to the 2024 census, it has a population of 37,325 people.

The town is also one of Antique's popular towns and a major tourist destination for its cold spring, the Bugang River and white beaches along the Pandan Bay from Barangay Mag-aba to Barangay Duyong.

== History ==
The town was formally established in 1752 by the Spanish Parishes in the province during the Philippines' colonization by Spain, which started in 1521 and ended with the Spanish–American War in 1899. During World War II, 1942 Japanese occupation of Panay Island saw the harassments and pandemonium in the area. The town was liberated in 1944 as part of the combined Allied forces campaign for the liberation of the Panay Island. In 1945, it was incorporated as a town under the fourth Philippine Republic.

== Geography ==
Pandan is located at 11°43′14″N 122°05′46″E. It is 127 kilometres (79 mi) from the provincial capital, San Jose de Buenavista, and is 55 kilometres (34 mi) from Kalibo, the capital of Aklan.

According to the Philippine Statistics Authority, the municipality has a land area of 113.98 square kilometres (44.01 sq mi) constituting 4.18% of the 2,729.17-square-kilometre- (1,053.74 sq mi) total area of Antique.

Pandan is bounded by Cuyo East Pass as part of Sulu Sea on the west; by Libertad on the north and northwest; by Aklan province on the east and northeast; and Sebaste on the south.

Pandan Bay has coral and artificial reefs, found in barangays Patria, Tingib, Mag-aba, Botbot and Idiacacan.

=== Barangays ===
Pandan is politically subdivided into 34 barangays, Each barangay consists of puroks and some have sitios.

There are 15 barangays which lie along the coast while 12 are inland, and 7 are upland.

PSGC	Barangay	Population			±% p.a.	
		2024		2010		
060611001	Aracay	0.4%	167	146	▴	0.94%
060611002	Badiangan	1.2%	444	468	▾	−0.36%
060611003	Bagumbayan	4.5%	1,685	1,563	▴	0.52%
060611004	Baybay	2.7%	996	986	▴	0.07%
060611005	Botbot	2.8%	1,037	975	▴	0.43%
060611007	Buang	1.0%	379	345	▴	0.65%
060611008	Cabugao	1.7%	629	522	▴	1.30%
060611009	Candari	1.5%	569	450	▴	1.64%
060611010	Carmen	1.5%	571	468	▴	1.39%
060611026	Centro Norte (Poblacion)	1.7%	651	647	▴	0.04%
060611011	Centro Sur (Poblacion)	3.4%	1,267	1,148	▴	0.69%
060611012	Dionela	2.4%	886	854	▴	0.26%
060611013	Dumrog	2.2%	812	803	▴	0.08%
060611014	Duyong	2.1%	767	713	▴	0.51%
060611015	Fragante	4.2%	1,575	1,498	▴	0.35%
060611016	Guia	2.7%	1,017	1,003	▴	0.10%
060611017	Idiacacan	4.7%	1,736	1,706	▴	0.12%
060611018	Jinalinan	2.7%	1,013	975	▴	0.27%
060611019	Luhod-Bayang	1.6%	580	576	▴	0.05%
060611020	Maadios	0.4%	137	154	▾	−0.81%
060611021	Mag-aba	4.8%	1,794	1,671	▴	0.49%
060611022	Napuid	0.5%	198	210	▾	−0.41%
060611023	Nauring	5.4%	2,018	1,904	▴	0.40%
060611024	Patria	8.1%	3,022	2,930	▴	0.21%
060611025	Perfecta	0.6%	226	224	▴	0.06%
060611027	San Andres	3.5%	1,314	1,306	▴	0.04%
060611028	San Joaquin	1.6%	582	670	▾	−0.97%
060611029	Santa Ana	1.6%	590	514	▴	0.96%
060611030	Santa Cruz	2.2%	817	726	▴	0.82%
060611031	Santa Fe	4.5%	1,668	1,579	▴	0.38%
060611032	Santo Rosario	4.6%	1,722	1,654	▴	0.28%
060611033	Talisay	4.7%	1,755	1,604	▴	0.63%
060611034	Tingib	1.9%	691	621	▴	0.74%
060611035	Zaldivar	2.7%	1,018	881	▴	1.01%
	Total		37,325	32,494	▴	0.97%

==== Sitios ====
- Proper, Badiangan
- Batiw, Badiangan
- Banawang, Badiangan
- Purok -1, Bagumbayan
- Purok -2, Bagumbayan
- Purok -3, Bagumbayan
- Pukatod, Bagumbayan
- Proper, Botbot
- Purok -1, Botbot
- Purok -2 ( Ilaya ), Botbot
- Purok -3, Botbot
- Purok -4, Botbot
- Purok -5, Botbot
- Purok -6, Botbot
- Purok -7, Botbot
- Purok -1, Buang
- Purok -2, Buang
- Purok -3, Buang
- Proper, Cabugao
- Proper, Candari
- Malumpati, Candari
- Banglid, Candari
- Anahaw, Candari
- Colanos, Candari
- Proper, Centro Sur (Pob.)
- Dumili, Centro Sur (Pob.)
- Proper, Dumrog
- Bura, Dumrog
- Sabay, Fragante
- Tabok, Fragante
- Ilaya, Fragante
- Ilawod, Fragante
- Tuburan, Guia
- Malumpati, Guia
- Proper, Idiacacan
- Calabanog, Idiacacan
- Purok -1, Jinalinan
- Purok -2, Jinalinan
- Purok -3, Jinalinan
- Purok -4, Jinalinan
- Purok -5, Jinalinan
- Purok -6, Jinalinan
- Purok -7, Jinalinan
- Proper, Luhod-Bayang
- Purok -1, Mag-Aba
- Purok -2, Mag-Aba
- Purok -3, Mag-Aba
- Purok -4, Mag-Aba
- Purok -5, Mag-Aba
- Purok -6, Mag-Aba
- Purok -7, Mag-Aba
- Purok -1, Nauring
- Purok -2, Nauring
- Purok -3, Nauring
- Purok -4, Nauring
- Purok -5, Nauring
- Purok -6, Nauring
- Igualdad, Nauring
- Bautista, Nauring
- Tabay, Patria
- Danao, Patria
- Hinogtan, Patria
- Inigman, Patria
- Purok Narra, San Andres
- Purok Ipil, San Andres
- Purok Dangkalan, San Andres
- Purok Avocado, San Andres
- Purok Molave, San Andres
- Purok -1, Sta. Cruz
- Purok -2, Sta. Cruz
- Purok -3, Sta. Cruz
- Purok -4, Sta. Cruz
- Proper, Sta. Fe
- Listoga, Sta. Fe
- Purok -1, Sto. Rosario
- Purok -2, Sto. Rosario
- Purok -3, Sto. Rosario
- Purok -4, Sto. Rosario
- Purok -5, Sto. Rosario
- Purok -6, Sto. Rosario
- Purok -7, Sto. Rosario
- Purok -8, Sto. Rosario
- Purok -9, Sto. Rosario
- Tuburan, Sto. Rosario
- Kaniyogan, Talisay
- Kapatyokahan, Talisay
- Kasagingan, Talisay
- Tulay, Talisay
- Lunok, Talisay
- Purok -1, Tingib
- Purok -2, Tingib
- Purok -3, Tingib
- Purok -4, Tingib
- Purok -1, Zaldivar
- Purok -2, Zaldivar
- Purok -3, Zaldivar
- Purok -4, Zaldivar
- Purok -5, Zaldivar
- Purok -6, Zaldivar

=== Climate ===
Climate data for Pandan, Antique
Month	Jan	Feb	Mar	Apr	May	Jun	Jul	Aug	Sep	Oct	Nov	Dec	Year
Mean daily maximum °C (°F)	28 (82)	29 (84)	30 (86)	32 (90)	32 (90)	31 (88)	30 (86)	30 (86)	29 (84)	29 (84)	29 (84)	28 (82)	30 (86)
Mean daily minimum °C (°F)	23 (73)	22 (72)	23 (73)	24 (75)	25 (77)	25 (77)	25 (77)	24 (75)	24 (75)	24 (75)	24 (75)	23 (73)	24 (75)
Average precipitation mm (inches)	47 (1.9)	33 (1.3)	39 (1.5)	48 (1.9)	98 (3.9)	150 (5.9)	169 (6.7)	147 (5.8)	163 (6.4)	172 (6.8)	118 (4.6)	80 (3.1)	1,264 (49.8)
Average rainy days	11.4	8.2	9.3	9.7	19.1	25.6	27.4	25.5	25.5	25.2	18.5	14.5	219.9
Source: Meteoblue

== Demographics ==
Population census of Pandan
Year	Pop.	±% p.a.
1903	12,162	—
1918	16,226	+1.94%
1939	19,561	+0.89%
1948	21,532	+1.07%
1960	19,788	−0.70%
1970	17,215	−1.38%
1975	18,661	+1.63%
1980	20,396	+1.79%
1990	23,894	+1.60%
1995	24,978	+0.83%
2000	27,647	+2.20%
2007	29,518	+0.91%
2010	32,494	+3.56%
2015	34,333	+1.05%
2020	35,965	+0.98%
2024	37,325	+0.90%
Source: Philippine Statistics Authority

The population of Pandan in 1903 until 1948 includes that of its former barangays in northern and southern parts (currently municipalities of Libertad and Sebaste, respectively). In the 2024 census, Pandan had a population of 37,325 people. The population density was 330 inhabitants per square kilometre (850/sq mi).

=== Language ===
The language generally spoken in the province of Antique is called Kinaray-a. The Pandananons use a version of Kinaray-a that is more similar to Aklanon. Thus, for example, the English word "No" is "Wara" in Kinaray-a but "Uwa" or "Wa" in Pandananon. Pandananons also use Hiligaynon as their secondary language.

== Economy ==
Poverty incidence of Pandan (%)

Source: Philippine Statistics Authority

Pandan is a cross-road municipality in Northern Antique, making it a better area for trade and commerce. Pandananons rely on agriculture and fishing which accounts for almost 75% of the total labor force. The other percentages were made up by professionals, civil servants, workers and Overseas Filipino Workers. The municipality began experiencing growth in tourism and development in infrastructure and commerce in late 2010. Some of the major projects that was completed in Pandan are the Pandan Public Terminal (which is bigger than that of Passi City's), the Pandan Arboretum project (first in Antique) near the Malumpati Spring Resort and other infrastructure projects in the barangays. The game changer is the Talisay-Perfecta-Santa Ana Road (to be constructed) that will connect the hinterland barangays of Pandan to the town centre. This will lessen the travel time and delivery of goods from the far-flung areas to the town. The current administration is working for more improvements in the growing tourism and commercial sectors.

== Tourism ==
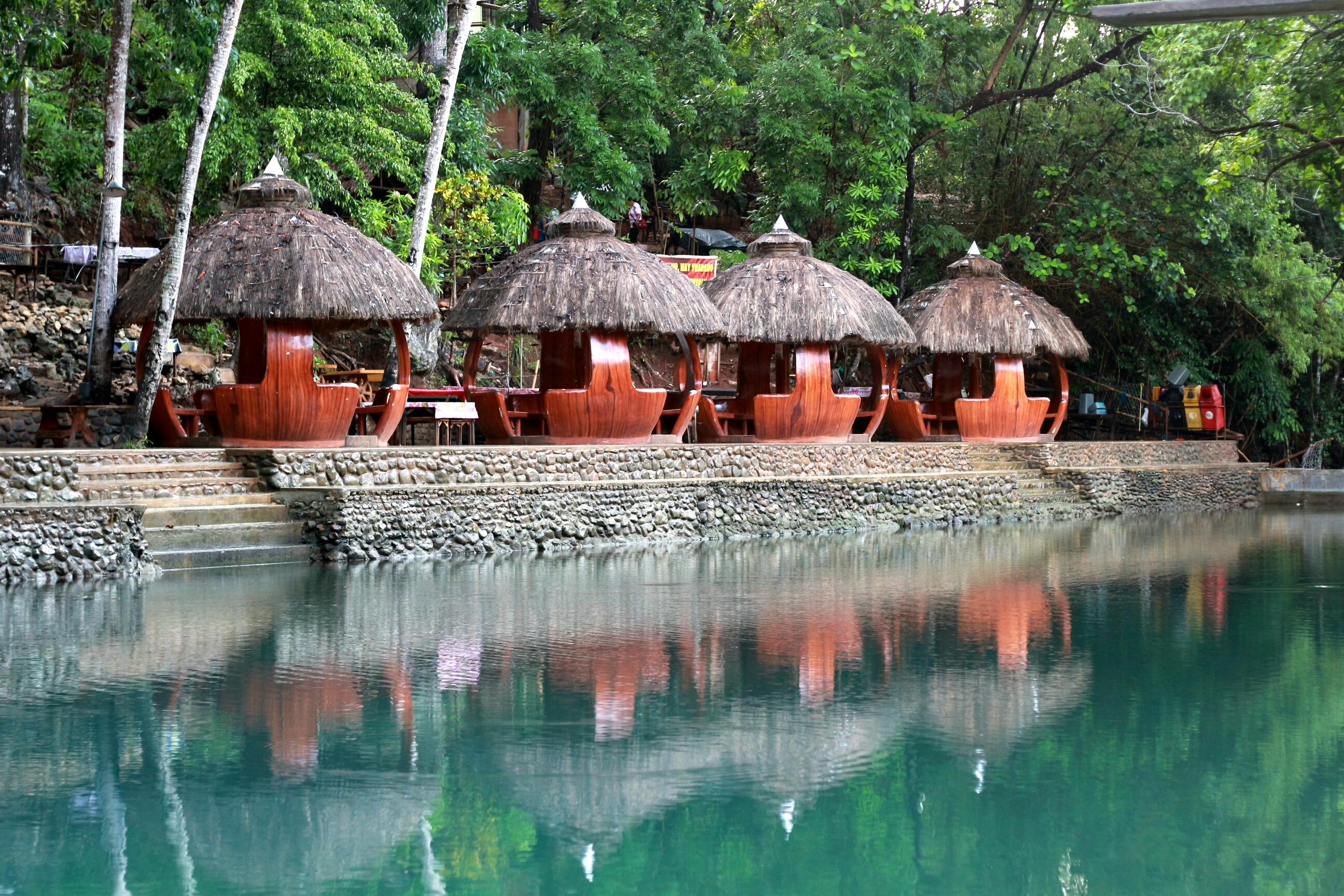
Malumpati Cold Spring Resort

The town is just 35 kilometres (22 mi) away from Boracay Island, which has become one of the world's popular beach resorts and tourist destinations. Both local and foreign tourists bound originally for Boracay have increasingly added a stop in Pandan before or after visiting Boracay.

The town's major attractions include the Malumpati Cold Spring Resort and other popular beach resorts and the Bugang River, which has been nationally awarded several times as "the cleanest inland body of water" in the Philippines; the Pandan Bay sunset, and white-sand beaches, sandwiched between the Sulu Sea to the west and, in the east, the Central Panay Mountain Range, and rice, coconut and other farms.

- Leocadio Alonsagay Dioso Memorial Public Library – Since 2004 Pandan has been home to a library that, according to the National Library of the Philippines, is among the top libraries of its kind in the country. The Dioso Library was built by retired United Nations official Leocadio F. Dioso, Jr. as an ongoing gift to the people and town of Pandan. It is named in honor of the founder's father, Leocadio A. Dioso, whose long career included service as Justice of the Peace, Presidential legal adviser, and Philippine diplomat. Although privately owned and operated, the Library functions officially as the Municipal Library and Information Center of Pandan. Housed in a two-story building on 1,700 sq. meters of land in the town center, a block away from the Pandan Bay beach area, the Library has a separate Main Collection Hall, Reading & Reference Room, Computer Room, Children's Room, a "United Nations Corner", and an external stage area for public presentations. Residents of Pandan can borrow books from the Library for up to three weeks at a time.
- Annual festival – Pandan's popular town fiesta, known as the Tugbong Festival, is held in honor of its patron saint, Saint Vincent Ferrer. The Festival runs from the 21st to the 25th of April and includes, among other events: the Agro-Industrial Fair; the Sports Tournament; the Dalmacio Marathon; the Motocross Invitational Competition; the Dasigay Bugsay Boat Rowing Competition; the Search for Miss Teen Pandan Beauty Pageant; the Ati-Atihan, Mardi-Gras and Float Competitions; and the PBI Annual Alumni Homecoming.
- Duyong Golden Beach – A long stretch of white sand beach from where one could see the panorama of the Duyong Mountain Ranges on the east, and a view of Batbatan Island and the setting sun on the west.
- Rosepoint Beach – a beach located in Barangay Mag-aba, nestled at the edge where the Bugang river meets the Pandan Bay

== Education ==
Acting under the Department of Education (DepEd), the Pandan School District oversees the implementation of the programs and thrusts of the department. The district is composed of 33 schools—10 mono-grade elementary schools; 5 multi-grade elementary schools, and 18 primary schools—with a total of 200 classrooms.

Secondary education is provided by two private schools (the Pandan Bay Institute, Inc. (PBI) and the Jinalinan Academy) and four public schools (the Pandan National Vocational High School (PNVHS), and the Patria, Mag-aba, and Santa Ana National High Schools). These six schools have a combined 58 classrooms.

Mag-aba National High School was founded in 1977. At first it was a Barangay High School but upon the term of President Corazon Aquino, all Barangay High Schools were renamed as National High Schools. Mag-aba National High School's campus was relocated to the eastern part of Barangay Mag-aba in 1992 where it currently stands.

Founded in 1947, the PBI (Pandan Bay Institute, Inc.) was formerly run by the Diocese of Antique but is now managed and operated by the Canadian Missionary Brothers of Christian Instruction (commonly known as the La Mennais Brothers). The Jinalinan Academy is operated by the Seventh-day Adventists. Located in the town proper, the PNVHS (Pandan National Vocational High School) was founded in 1997 and had its first graduates at the end of the 2000–2001 school year.

On a limited basis, tertiary education is provided by the Jinalinan Academy (which offers a one-year Health Aide course) and by the PBI (which offers two-year Computer Science and Computer Secretarial courses).

=== Primary and elementary schools ===
- Agripino Tambagahan Memorial School
- Badiangan Elementary School
- Bagumbayan Elementary School
- Botbot Elementary School
- Buang Elementary School
- Cabugao Elementary School
- Ciriaco Tayco Memorial School
- Duyong Elementary School
- Fragante Elementary School
- Guia Elementary School
- Idiacacan Elementary School
- Jinalinan Elementary School
- Maadios Elementary School
- Mag-aba Elementary School
- Nauring Elementary School
- Pandan Central School
- Patria Elementary School
- San Andres-Dumrog Elementary School
- Santa Ana Elementary School
- Santa Cruz Elementary School
- Santa Fe Elementary School
- Santo Rosario Elementary School
- Tabay Elementary School
- Talisay Elementary School
- Tingib Elementary School
- Vidal Gelito Memorial School

=== Secondary schools ===
- Jinalinan Academy
- Mag-aba National High School
- Pandan Bay Institute
- Pandan National Vocational High School (Centro Norte)
- Patria National School
- Santa Ana National High School

=== Higher educational institutions ===
- Pandan Bay Institute
- University of the Philippines - Visayas (Antique)

== Healthcare ==
Pandan has one district hospital, the Justice Calixto Zaldivar Memorial Hospital formerly known as Gov. Leandro Locsin Fullon General Hospital, with a 25-bed capacity located at Barangay Bagumbayan, one kilometer away from the town center. It is staffed by a chief of hospital, two resident physicians, eight nurses, one midwife, one dentist, one pharmacist, one medical technologist, and one nutritionist. Attached to the hospital is the Alexander Liberman Memorial Surgical Pavilion.

There is a private Lying-In-Clinic (Tugon Medical Clinic) which is located at the town center. It has a 10-bed capacity and is staffed by one physician, five nurses, one midwife, one dentist, two pharmacists and one medical technologist.

The Municipal Health Office is staffed by one Municipal Health Officer (MHO), two Public Health Nurses (PHN), ten Rural Health Midwives (RHM), one Rural Sanitary Inspector (RSI), four casuals, and one janitor. Each RHM has her own catchment area which is composed of 3-4 barangays. One RHM is based at the Main Health Center. Out of nine Barangay Health Stations (BHS), only three have permanent buildings and these need repair. Midwives with no permanent BHS occupy the Barangay Hall.

The programs and services implemented by the Municipal Health Office are: National Tuberculosis Control Program (NTP); Health and Sanitation; Maternal and Child Health Care (MCHC); Nutrition; Expanded Program on Immunization (EPI); Control of Diarrheal Disease; Leprosy Control, and Family Planning. These programs and services are implemented throughout the municipality through the efforts of the Rural Health Personnel with the help of the Barangay Health Workers (BHW), Barangay Nutrition Scholars (BNS) and trained hilots in their respective barangays.

== Infrastructure ==
=== Water supply ===
Pandan has a sufficient supply of water in general. It also has good sources of potable water that may not require chemical treatment. The water supply operates at three levels—the individual faucet system (Level III); the communal faucet system (Level II) and the point source system (level I) -- which are in the form of wells and springs common in the rural areas.

A Level III Water Works System operated and maintained by the Pandan Water District supplies 20 barangays in the municipality. The system was built through a joint undertaking of the Japan Asian Friendship Society and the Local Government of Pandan. The system basically draws water from a spring located in Malumpati and pumps it to a reservoir located in Santo Rosario. It then distributes water by gravity to its concessionaires. It is currently capable of supplying 540,000 liters per day, mainly for domestic consumption (currently involving 1,132 users).

Other barangays not covered by the Pandan Water District get their water through gravity-type spring development projects, involving the installation of communal faucets at strategic locations within each barangay.

Level I systems exist in areas where other sources are not available. Prior to the operation of the Level III system, Level I systems were popularly used by most of the households in the municipality. At present, these are still maintained as a back-up source of water supply.

=== Power supply ===
The Aklan Electric Cooperative (AKELCO) supplies electricity to the municipality. AKELCO sourced its power from the National Power Corporation. Electricity had already reached almost majority of the barangays in the municipality except those, which are located in the hinterlands. One barangay in the hinterland obtains its electricity from a mini-hydro power plant.

In Pandan, the total percentage of household served is 33.31% in the rural area while 86.13% is being served in the urban area. Even though some households can already be reached by electric supply, they choose not to get connected due mainly to its high cost. They rely instead on other means for lighting, cooking and other purposes.

Although the government with the partnership of the AKELCO is currently implementing its electrification program in the barangays, delays in the implementation can be expected because of the high cost of transmission lines and other facilities needed. There is also a low demand in electric connection because some households are not capable of paying installation expenses as well as the monthly bills.

Power outages and fluctuation can be frequently experienced in Pandan which usually occur during weather disturbances. Old and in facilities are also one of the causes.

AKELCO gets its supply of power from NAPOCOR through a 69 kV transmission line traversing the Iloilo-Capiz-Aklan area. When power from this line is cut-off due to maintenance or weather disturbances, Pandan experiences a power outage.

== Sister cities ==
Pandan is twinned with the following cities:

Country	Place	Region / State	Date
Philippines	Valenzuela	Metro Manila	February 28, 2020

== Notable personalities ==
- Calixto Zaldivar – former representative, Lone District of Antique (1934–1935), former governor of Antique (1951–1955) and former Associate Justice of the Supreme Court (1964–1974). Former president of the National Lay Organization of the Iglesia Filipina Independiente.
- Jonathan Dioso Tan - Filipino politician and businessman. Former mayor of Pandan, Antique and Chairman and Administrator of the Subic Bay Metropolitan Authority (SBMA). He was appointed by President Marcos Jr. as Undersecretary of the Department of the Interior and Local Government (DILG) last January 12, 2024.
- Lauren Anne Young - Filipino-American actress and model. She is the younger sister of actress and Miss World 2013 Megan Young.
- Loren Legarda - senator, journalist, and UN Global Champion for Resilience
- Megan Young - Filipino-American actress, model, TV Host and beauty queen. She won the Miss World Philippines title and was later crowned as Miss World 2013 in Bali, Indonesia. She is the daughter of Victoria Talde who hails from Pandan, Antique.
- Nelia Sancho - born 1951 in Botbot, Pandan, Antique was Binibining Pilipinas 1969 1st Runner Up and Queen of the Pacific 1971 winner.
- Salvacion Zaldivar-Perez - former Antique Governor.
